= Puymirol =

- Commune
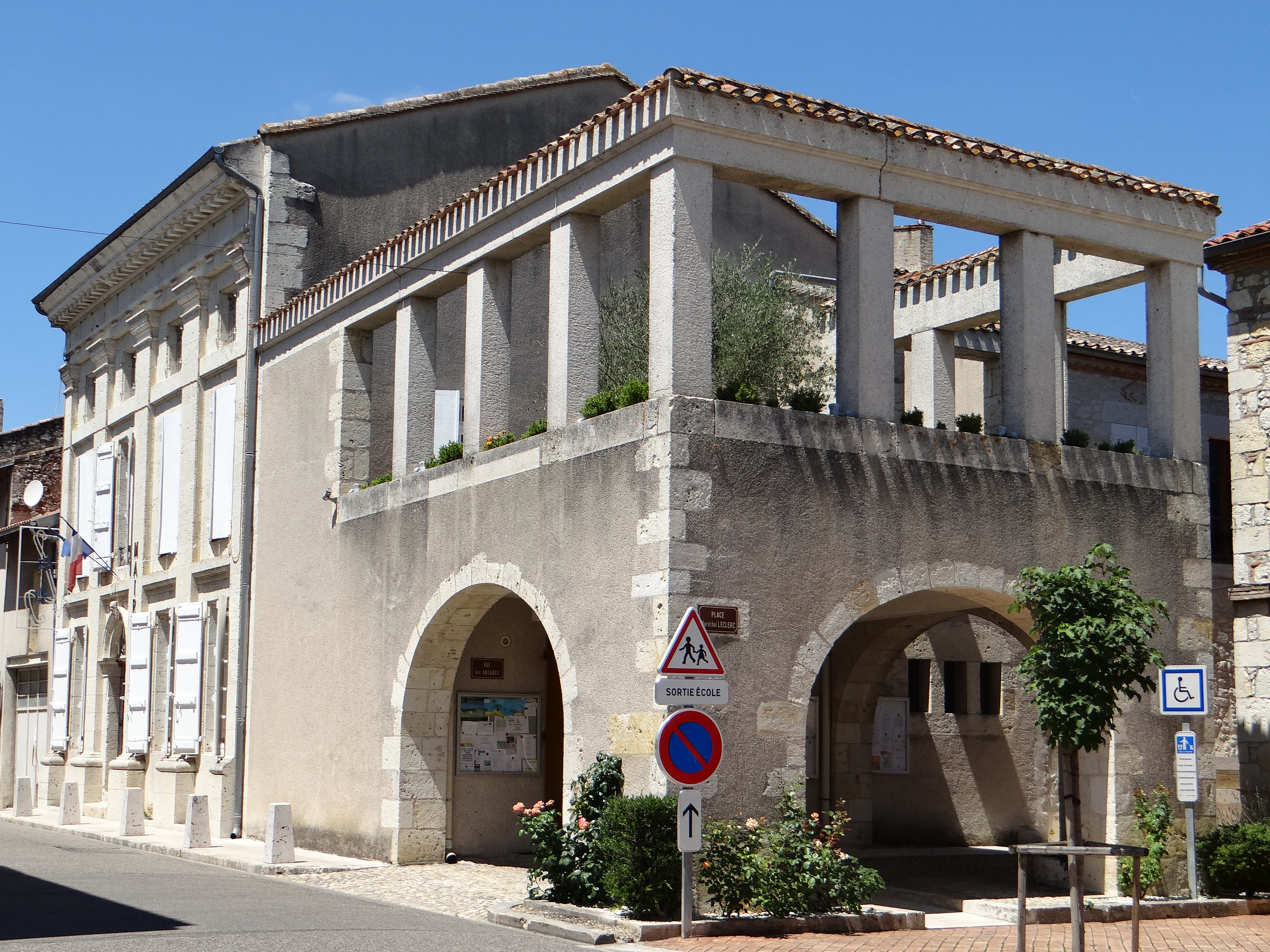
- The town hall in Puymirol

- Coat of arms
- Location of Puymirol
- Location within France Location within Nouvelle-Aquitaine
- Coordinates: 44°11′16″N 0°47′54″E
- Country: France
- Region: Nouvelle-Aquitaine
- Department: Lot-et-Garonne
- Arrondissement: Agen
- Canton: Le Sud-Est agenais
- Intercommunality: Agglomération d'Agen

Government
  - Mayor (2023–2026): Bernard Durruty
- Area^{1}: 19.54 km^{2} (7.54 sq mi)
- Elevation: 144 m (472 ft)
- Highest elevation: 191 m (627 ft)
- Lowest elevation: 57 m (187 ft)
- Population (2023): 899
  - Density: 46.0/km^{2} (119/sq mi)
- Time zone: UTC+01:00 (CET)
  - Summer (DST): UTC+02:00 (CEST)
- INSEE/Postal code: 47217 /47270
- ^{1} French Land Register data, which excludes lakes, ponds, glaciers > 1 km^{2} (0.386 sq mi or 247 acres) and river estuaries.

Puymirol (French pronunciation: [pɥimiʁɔl]; Occitan: Puègmiròl) is a commune in the Lot-et-Garonne department in south-western France.

== Etymology ==
Puymirol is derived from the Occitan words puèg (hill or peak) and miròl (a variant of mirador or mirar, meaning to watch).

Residents of the town are known as Puymirolais (or Puymirolaise for women).

== Geography ==
The Séoune stream forms part of the commune's eastern border, flows westward through the middle of the commune, then forms part of its western border.

== History ==
Puymirol is believed to have had ancient origins, since its fairs are mentioned in a document from 1100.

In 1246, Puymirol was founded by Raymond VII, Count of Toulouse, on land ceded by Peter of Reims, Bishop of Agen. Sitting on a steep Plateau at an altitude of 153 metres, the town of Puymirol is an ancient Bastide from the thirteenth century.

Prior to 1246, a population center was already located there, near a church dedicated to Saint Seurin. Known by various names, Puymirol, called Podium ad Mirandum in late antiquity (the hill from which one can see), was renamed Grand Castel, or Grande Castellum by Raymond VII of Toulouse, who wanted to make the pech a strategic place, an outpost on the border between Toulouse and Agenais, in order to maintain a degree of control over the lands left to him by the Treaty of Paris in 1229.

The name Grand Castel did not last long, and the older name of Puymirol resurfaced. A new church, built at the same time as the town was dedicated to Notre-Dame-de-l'Assomption, whose origins lay in the pre-existing church of Saint-Seurin as late as the 13th century.

The founding of Puymirol/Grand Castel by Raymond VII, as its name suggests, cannot be dissociated from a castle, a fortress from its very beginnings. Established by the Count of Toulouse, it organized and defined the town's function. The first of a growing number of bastides in the Agenais region, Puymirol presents itself in a unique light: a medieval town with the appearance of a fortress, with originally military functions that would have made it similar to a castle-like town. While Raymond VII chose the name Grand Castel for this new settlement, he intended to give the place a military and imposing dimension.

In 1286, Edward I of England, King of England, granted new Customary laws to the city's inhabitants. These privileges were considerable because during the alternating English or French occupation, each side had an interest in bidding for favors and concessions to ensure the support and obedience of the inhabitants of Puymirol. All the towns of Agenais were besieged, taken, and retaken many times from the Albigensian War to the Fronde. However, Puymirol suffered fewer assaults than most of the others. It was unsuccessfully besieged in 1324 by French troops; it was then defended a captain of the English party, Amanieu du Fossat, Lord of Madaillan.

The historic walls of Puymirol, which followed the contours of the plateau, were 790 metres long and 90 to 250 metres wide. Four gates of unequal dimensions were pierced through this wall: the Saint-Seurin Gate to the south, the Citadel Gate to the east, the Rause Gate to the north, and the Comtale Gate to the west. These represent streets providing access to the ramparts today. Puymirol has several streets running along its length, intersected by other perpendicular ones, and the Place des Cornières is almost in the center. Three wells, regularly spaced along the central street, served to supply the population with water.

In 1337, the town and castle of Puymirol were besieged by Étienne II de La Baume, Grand Master of the Crossbowmen commanding the French troops. The capitulation took place on 17 July 1337. This siege marked the beginning of the Hundred Years' War "on the ground" between the kings of France and England.

=== Late Middle Ages ===
During the Wars of Religion of the 16th century, Puymirol, under François de Montpezat, was attacked by French Protestants in November 1569. In 1574, the Protestants succeeded in occupying it, and held on until the accession of Henry IV of France in 1589.

Henry IV, whilst waging war in Guyenne, made Puymirol a safe haven, a place he seemed to have held in particularly high regard. Henry IV also added new, more robust fortifications to Puymirol Castle. The Ficart Tower still stands today on the southeast tip of the rampart.

In the 16th century, the church of Saint-Seurin, located outside the walls, and the urban church of Notre-Dame were destroyed by the Protestants, who reused the materials for the fortifications.

The church of Saint-Seurin was never rebuilt. Of the urban church of Notre-Dame, only the porch and the bell tower were left intact.

Under the Ancien Régime, the Puymirol corn exchange was one of the most important in Guyenne. Transactions there reached an all-important figure as the jurisdiction's merchants brought enormous quantities of grain to the colonies.

Boarded either at Lafox or Saint-Romain-le-Noble, these goods were shipped down the Garonne to Bordeaux, where they were transported by sea. The grain market was regularly held on Tuesdays and Fridays of each week, and the town clerk was responsible for recording prices in the fourleau, or book of market prices.

These preserved records document the price variations of goods such as soft wheat, millet, and cocoa beans.

== Heraldry ==
Puymirol	Or, a mount gules placed in the center, flanked by two trees vert.

== Demographics ==
The evolution of the population is known through population censuses carried out in the commune since 1793. For communes with fewer than 10,000 inhabitants, a census survey covering the entire population is conducted every five years, with the reference populations for the intervening years being estimated by interpolation or extrapolation. For the municipality, the first comprehensive census under the new system was conducted in 2005.

In 2022, the communes had 903 inhabitants. This represents a decrease of 3.63% compared to 2016 (Lot-et-Garonne: 0.18%, France excluding Mayotte: +2.11%).

The 1793 census data covers the entire territory of Puymirol, Saint-Caprais, Saint-Jean-de-Thurac, Saint-Pierre-de-Clairac, Saint-Romain-le-Noble and Saint-Urcisse.

== See also ==
- Communes of the Lot-et-Garonne department
