= La Sauvetat-de-Savères =

- Commune
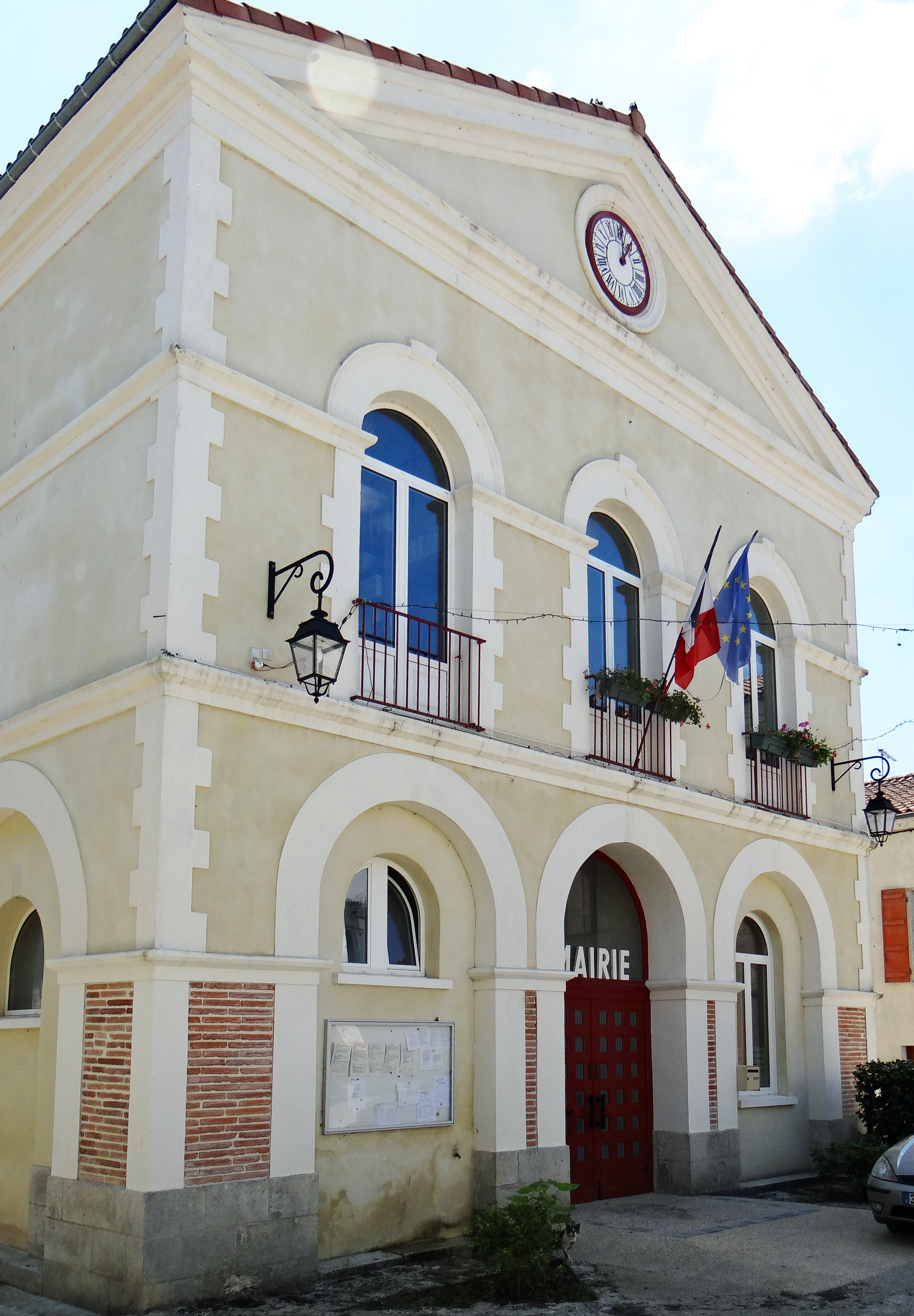
- The town hall in La Sauvetat-de-Savères

- Coat of arms
- Location of La Sauvetat-de-Savères
- Location within France Location within Nouvelle-Aquitaine
- Coordinates: 44°13′37″N 0°47′56″E
- Country: France
- Region: Nouvelle-Aquitaine
- Department: Lot-et-Garonne
- Arrondissement: Agen
- Canton: Le Pays de Serres
- Intercommunality: Agglomération d'Agen

Government
  - Mayor (2024–2026): David Alexis
- Area^{1}: 6.86 km^{2} (2.65 sq mi)
- Elevation: 180 m (590 ft)
- Highest elevation: 194 m (636 ft)
- Lowest elevation: 64 m (210 ft)
- Population (2023): 479
  - Density: 69.8/km^{2} (181/sq mi)
- Time zone: UTC+01:00 (CET)
  - Summer (DST): UTC+02:00 (CEST)
- INSEE/Postal code: 47289 /47270
- ^{1} French Land Register data, which excludes lakes, ponds, glaciers > 1 km^{2} (0.386 sq mi or 247 acres) and river estuaries.

La Sauvetat-de-Savères (French pronunciation: [la sovta də savɛʁ]; Occitan: La Sauvetat de Savèras) is a commune in the Lot-et-Garonne department in south-western France.

== History ==
La Sauvetat-de-Savères was, in the 12th century, a bastide built up around a Benedictine priory. From the jurisdiction of Puymirol in the 13th century, La-Sauvetat-de-Savères became the chief town of the bailiwick of the same name in the 14th century. A garrison was placed there in 1587, for keeping watch Puymirol. On 16 August 1589 Villars attacked four companies of Laugnac and Belzunce who had taken refuge there, and exerted reprisals on the city.

== See also ==
- Communes of the Lot-et-Garonne department
