= Saint-Martin-de-Beauville =

- Commune
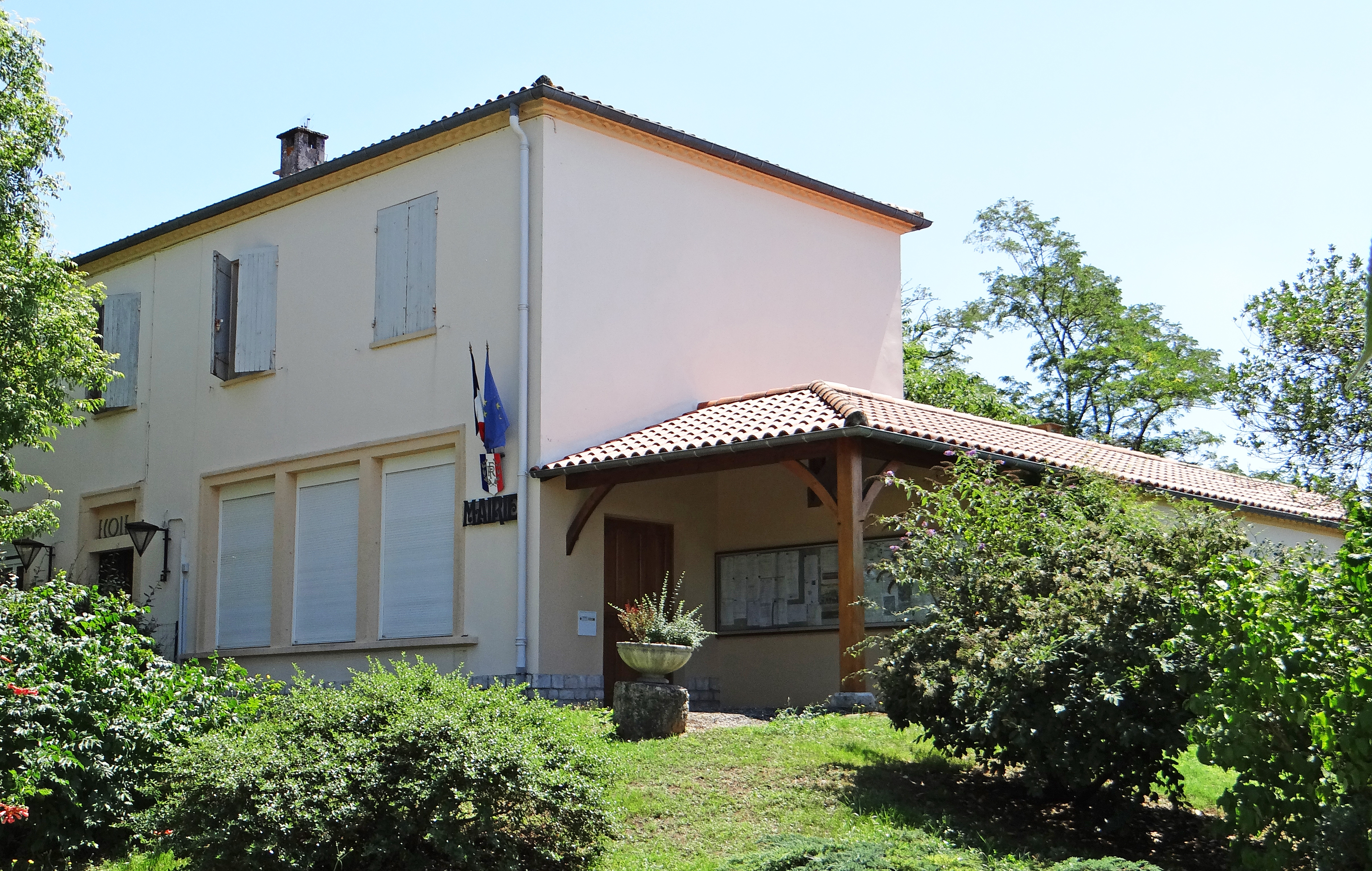
- The town hall in Saint-Martin-de-Beauville

- Coat of arms
- Location of Saint-Martin-de-Beauville
- Location within France Location within Nouvelle-Aquitaine
- Coordinates: 44°13′40″N 0°49′08″E
- Country: France
- Region: Nouvelle-Aquitaine
- Department: Lot-et-Garonne
- Arrondissement: Agen
- Canton: Le Pays de Serres
- Intercommunality: Agglomération d'Agen

Government
  - Mayor (2020–2026): Thierry Valette
- Area^{1}: 7.54 km^{2} (2.91 sq mi)
- Elevation: 170 m (560 ft)
- Highest elevation: 201 m (659 ft)
- Lowest elevation: 70 m (230 ft)
- Population (2023): 154
  - Density: 20.4/km^{2} (52.9/sq mi)
- Time zone: UTC+01:00 (CET)
  - Summer (DST): UTC+02:00 (CEST)
- INSEE/Postal code: 47255 /47270
- ^{1} French Land Register data, which excludes lakes, ponds, glaciers > 1 km^{2} (0.386 sq mi or 247 acres) and river estuaries.

Saint-Martin-de-Beauville (French pronunciation: [sɛ̃ maʁtɛ̃ də bovil], literally Saint-Martin of Beauville; Languedocien: Sent Martin de Bauvila) is a commune in the Lot-et-Garonne department in south-western France.

== See also ==
- Communes of the Lot-et-Garonne department
