= Canton of Le Sud-Est agenais =

Coordinates: 44.13°N 0.66°E

The canton of Le Sud-Est agenais is an administrative division of the Lot-et-Garonne department, southwestern France. It was created at the French canton reorganisation which came into effect in March 2015. Its seat is in Layrac.

It consists of the following communes:

1. Astaffort
2. Castelculier
3. Caudecoste
4. Clermont-Soubiran
5. Cuq
6. Fals
7. Grayssas
8. Lafox
9. Layrac
10. Puymirol
11. Saint-Caprais-de-Lerm
12. Saint-Jean-de-Thurac
13. Saint-Nicolas-de-la-Balerme
14. Saint-Pierre-de-Clairac
15. Saint-Romain-le-Noble
16. Saint-Sixte
17. Saint-Urcisse
18. Sauvagnas
19. Sauveterre-Saint-Denis
