= Blaymont =

- Commune
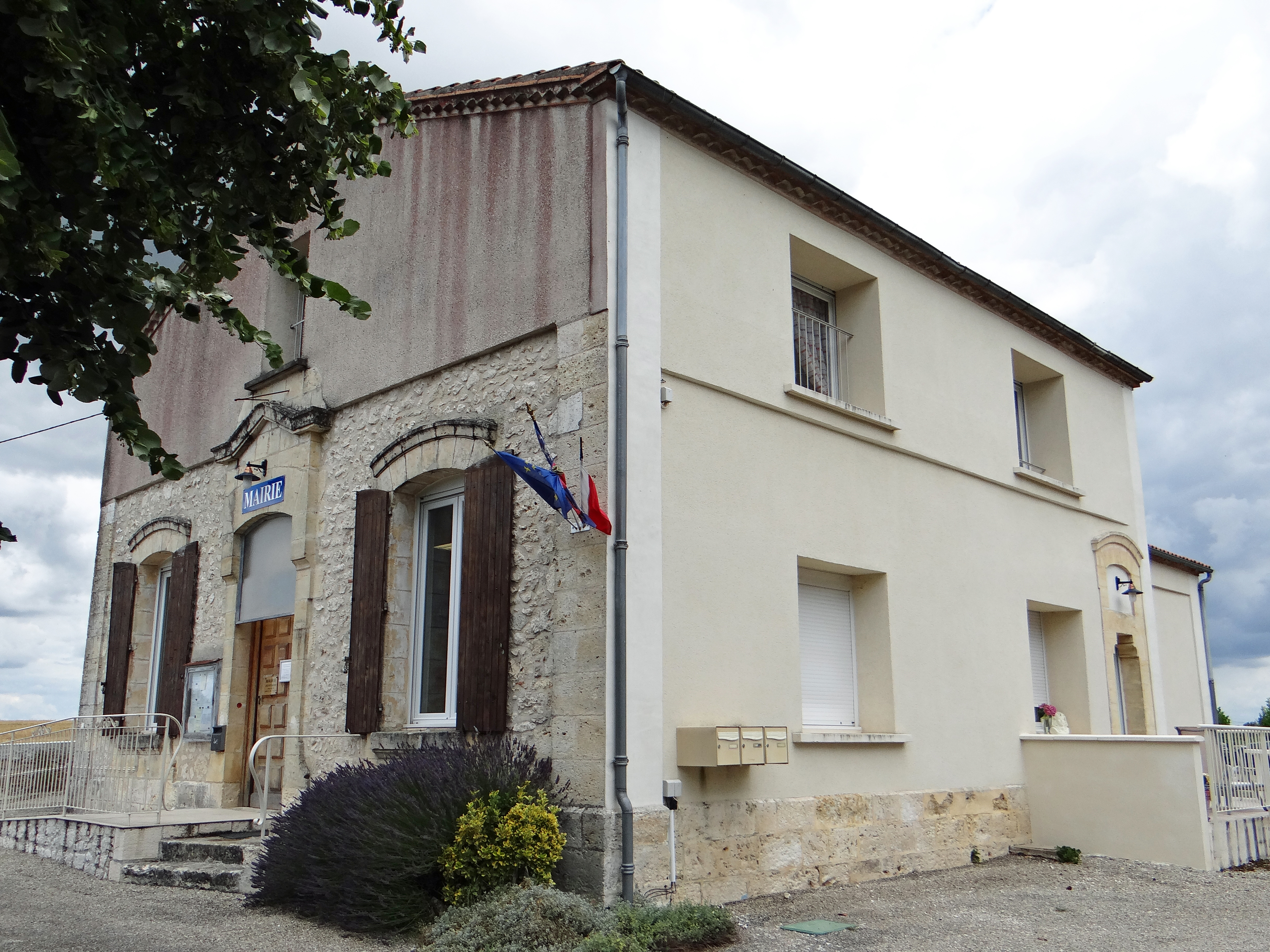
- Town hall
- Location of Blaymont
- Location within France Location within Nouvelle-Aquitaine
- Coordinates: 44°18′18″N 0°51′47″E
- Country: France
- Region: Nouvelle-Aquitaine
- Department: Lot-et-Garonne
- Arrondissement: Agen
- Canton: Le Pays de Serres
- Intercommunality: Agglomération d'Agen

Government
  - Mayor (2020–2026): Marie-Thérèse Coulonges
- Area^{1}: 13.56 km^{2} (5.24 sq mi)
- Elevation: 200 m (660 ft)
- Highest elevation: 228 m (748 ft)
- Lowest elevation: 85 m (279 ft)
- Population (2023): 216
  - Density: 15.9/km^{2} (41.3/sq mi)
- Time zone: UTC+01:00 (CET)
  - Summer (DST): UTC+02:00 (CEST)
- INSEE/Postal code: 47030 /47470
- ^{1} French Land Register data, which excludes lakes, ponds, glaciers > 1 km^{2} (0.386 sq mi or 247 acres) and river estuaries.

Blaymont (French pronunciation: [blɛmɔ̃]; Occitan: Blaimont) is a commune in the Lot-et-Garonne department in southwestern France.

== Population ==
Historical population
Year	Pop.	±% p.a.
1968	254	—
1975	214	−2.42%
1982	209	−0.34%
1990	217	+0.47%
1999	196	−1.12%
2007	221	+1.51%
2012	220	−0.09%
2017	209	−1.02%
2023	216	+0.55%
Source: INSEE

== See also ==
- Communes of the Lot-et-Garonne department
