= Engayrac =

- Commune
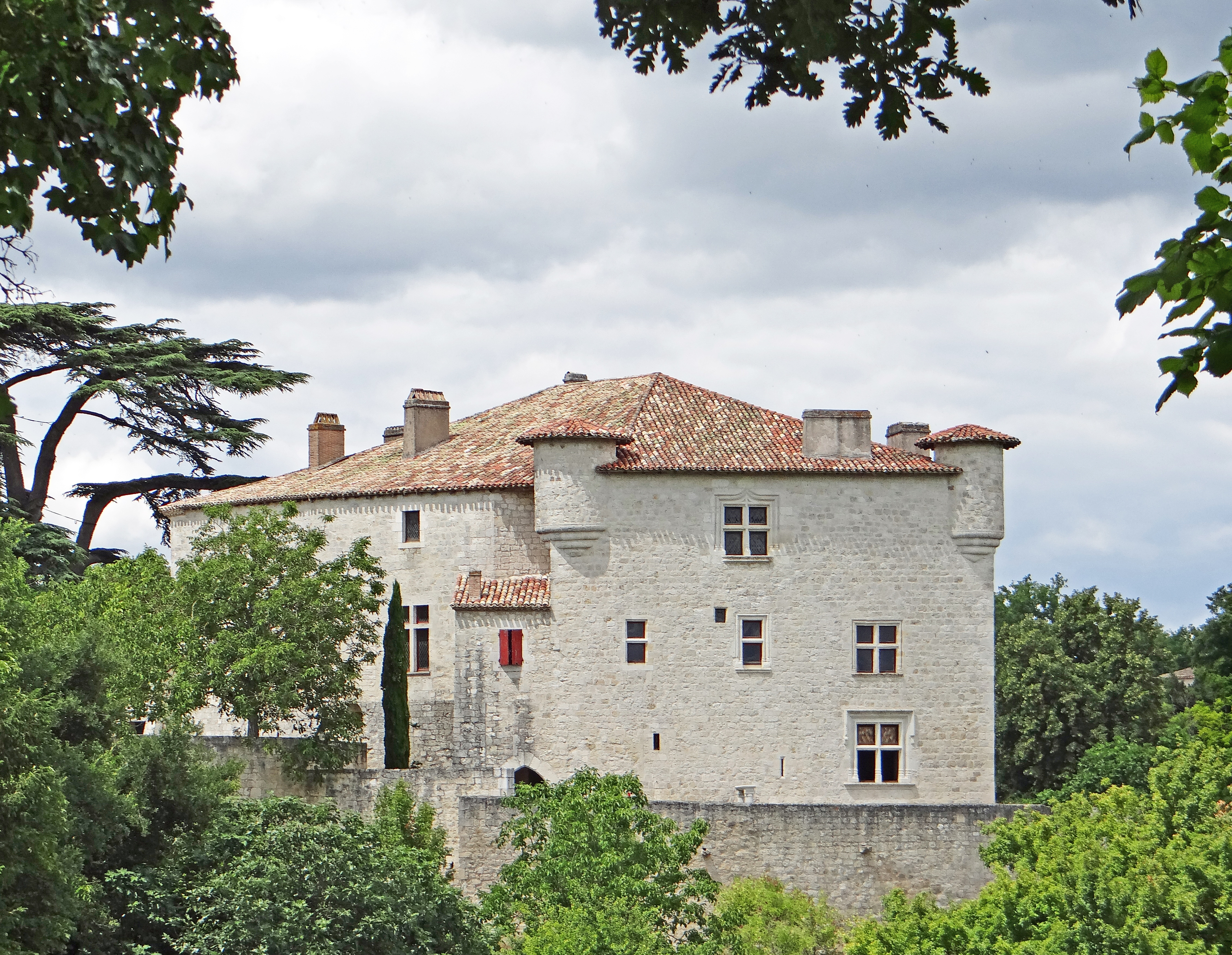
- The château of la Combebonnet, in Engayrac
- Location of Engayrac
- Location within France Location within Nouvelle-Aquitaine
- Coordinates: 44°15′37″N 0°53′11″E
- Country: France
- Region: Nouvelle-Aquitaine
- Department: Lot-et-Garonne
- Arrondissement: Agen
- Canton: Le Pays de Serres
- Intercommunality: Agglomération d'Agen

Government
  - Mayor (2020–2026): Marie-France Salles
- Area^{1}: 10.03 km^{2} (3.87 sq mi)
- Elevation: 222 m (728 ft)
- Highest elevation: 227 m (745 ft)
- Lowest elevation: 110 m (360 ft)
- Population (2023): 160
  - Density: 16/km^{2} (41/sq mi)
- Time zone: UTC+01:00 (CET)
  - Summer (DST): UTC+02:00 (CEST)
- INSEE/Postal code: 47087 /47470
- ^{1} French Land Register data, which excludes lakes, ponds, glaciers > 1 km^{2} (0.386 sq mi or 247 acres) and river estuaries.

Engayrac is a commune in the Lot-et-Garonne department in south-western France.

== See also ==
- Communes of the Lot-et-Garonne department
