= Moirax =

- Commune
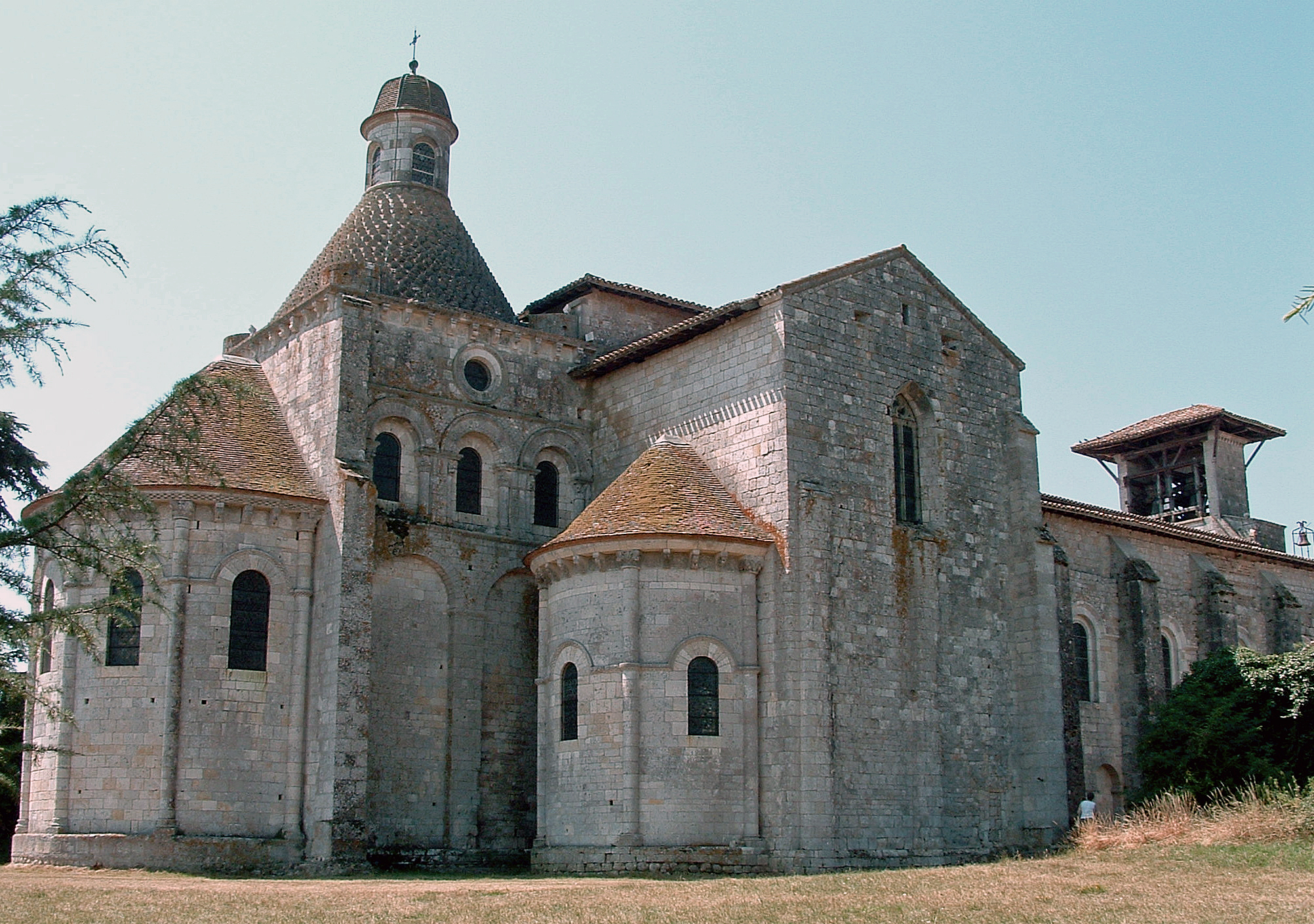
- The church in Moirax

- Coat of arms
- Location of Moirax
- Location within France Location within Nouvelle-Aquitaine
- Coordinates: 44°08′30″N 0°36′35″E
- Country: France
- Region: Nouvelle-Aquitaine
- Department: Lot-et-Garonne
- Arrondissement: Agen
- Canton: L'Ouest agenais
- Intercommunality: Agglomération d'Agen

Government
  - Mayor (2020–2026): Henri Tandonnet
- Area^{1}: 16.2 km^{2} (6.3 sq mi)
- Elevation: 139 m (456 ft)
- Highest elevation: 183 m (600 ft)
- Lowest elevation: 41 m (135 ft)
- Population (2023): 1,197
  - Density: 73.9/km^{2} (191/sq mi)
- Time zone: UTC+01:00 (CET)
  - Summer (DST): UTC+02:00 (CEST)
- INSEE/Postal code: 47169 /47310
- ^{1} French Land Register data, which excludes lakes, ponds, glaciers > 1 km^{2} (0.386 sq mi or 247 acres) and river estuaries.

Moirax is a commune in the Lot-et-Garonne department in south-western France.

== See also ==
- Communes of the Lot-et-Garonne department
