= Canton of Agen-1 =

French canton

Coordinates: 44.21°N 0.64°E

The canton of Agen-1 is an administrative division of the Lot-et-Garonne department, southwestern France. It was created at the French canton reorganisation which came into effect in March 2015. Its seat is in Agen.

It consists of the following communes:

1. Agen (partly)
2. Bajamont
3. Foulayronnes
4. Pont-du-Casse
