= Clermont-Soubiran =

- Commune
- Coat of arms
- Location of Clermont-Soubiran
- Location within France Location within Nouvelle-Aquitaine
- Coordinates: 44°08′29″N 0°49′59″E
- Country: France
- Region: Nouvelle-Aquitaine
- Department: Lot-et-Garonne
- Arrondissement: Agen
- Canton: Le Sud-Est agenais
- Intercommunality: Deux Rives

Government
  - Mayor (2020–2026): Guy Depasse
- Area^{1}: 10.39 km^{2} (4.01 sq mi)
- Elevation: 103 m (338 ft)
- Highest elevation: 188 m (617 ft)
- Lowest elevation: 45 m (148 ft)
- Population (2023): 395
  - Density: 38.0/km^{2} (98.5/sq mi)
- Time zone: UTC+01:00 (CET)
  - Summer (DST): UTC+02:00 (CEST)
- INSEE/Postal code: 47067 /47270
- ^{1} French Land Register data, which excludes lakes, ponds, glaciers > 1 km^{2} (0.386 sq mi or 247 acres) and river estuaries.

Clermont-Soubiran (French pronunciation: [klɛʁmɔ̃ subiʁɑ̃]; Occitan: Clarmont Sobiran) is a commune in the Lot-et-Garonne department in south-western France.

== Geography ==
The Barguelonne forms most of the commune's south-eastern border.

== See also ==
- Communes of the Lot-et-Garonne department
