= Pont-du-Casse =

- Commune
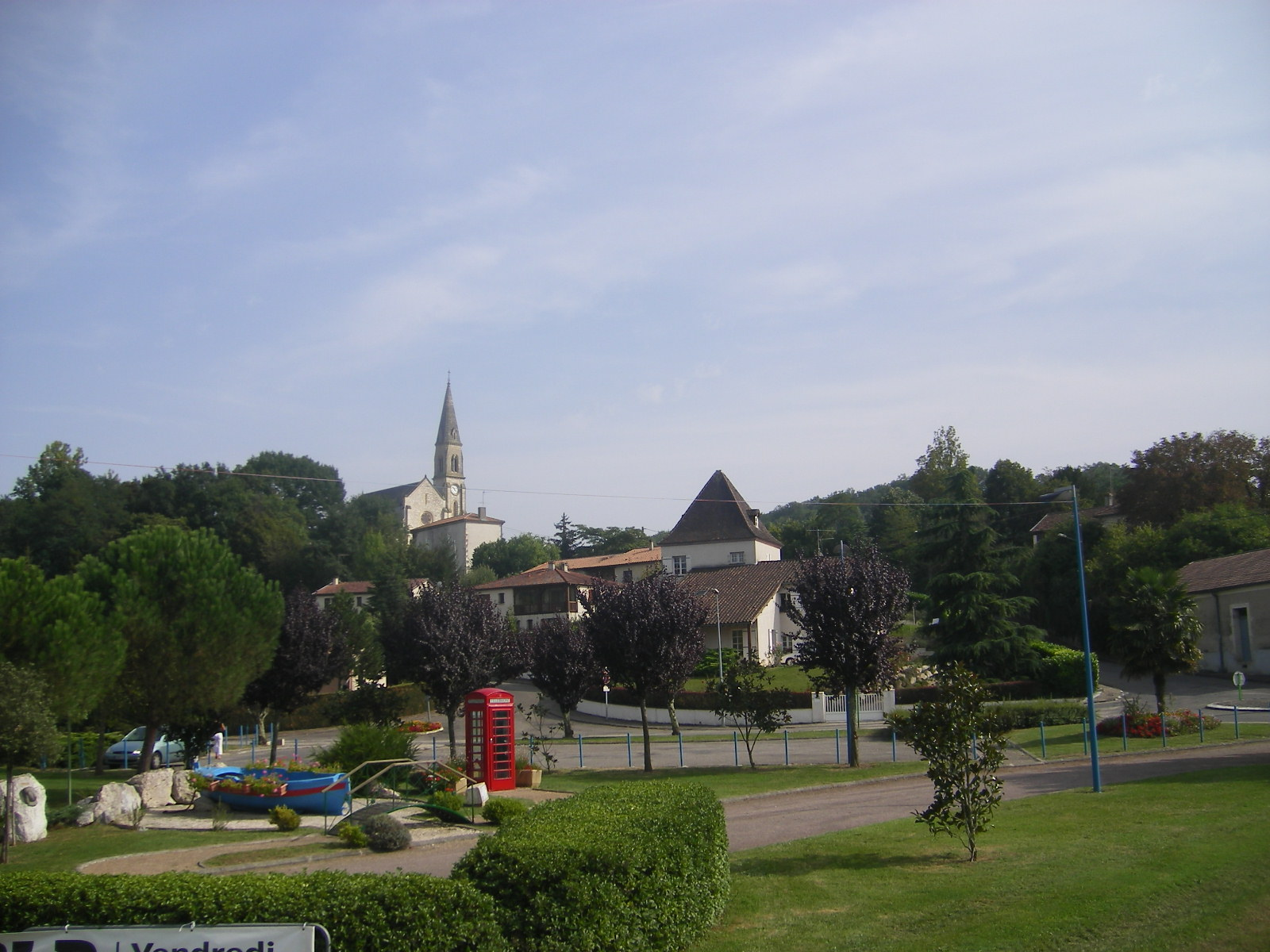
- A general view of Pont-du-Casse

- Coat of arms
- Location of Pont-du-Casse
- Location within France Location within Nouvelle-Aquitaine
- Coordinates: 44°13′57″N 0°40′55″E
- Country: France
- Region: Nouvelle-Aquitaine
- Department: Lot-et-Garonne
- Arrondissement: Agen
- Canton: Agen-1
- Intercommunality: Agglomération d'Agen

Government
  - Mayor (2020–2026): Christian Delbrel
- Area^{1}: 19.1 km^{2} (7.4 sq mi)
- Elevation: 63 m (207 ft)
- Highest elevation: 204 m (669 ft)
- Lowest elevation: 53 m (174 ft)
- Population (2023): 4,191
  - Density: 219/km^{2} (568/sq mi)
- Time zone: UTC+01:00 (CET)
  - Summer (DST): UTC+02:00 (CEST)
- INSEE/Postal code: 47209 /47480
- ^{1} French Land Register data, which excludes lakes, ponds, glaciers > 1 km^{2} (0.386 sq mi or 247 acres) and river estuaries.

Pont-du-Casse (French pronunciation: [pɔ̃ dy kas]; Occitan: Lo Pont del Casse) is a commune in the Lot-et-Garonne department in south-western France.

== Population ==
Historical population
Year	Pop.	±% p.a.
1968	1,798	—
1975	2,405	+4.24%
1982	3,485	+5.44%
1990	4,479	+3.19%
1999	4,259	−0.56%
2007	4,305	+0.13%
2012	4,269	−0.17%
2017	4,212	−0.27%
2023	4,191	−0.08%
Source: INSEE

== See also ==
- Communes of the Lot-et-Garonne department
