= Sérignac-sur-Garonne =

- Commune
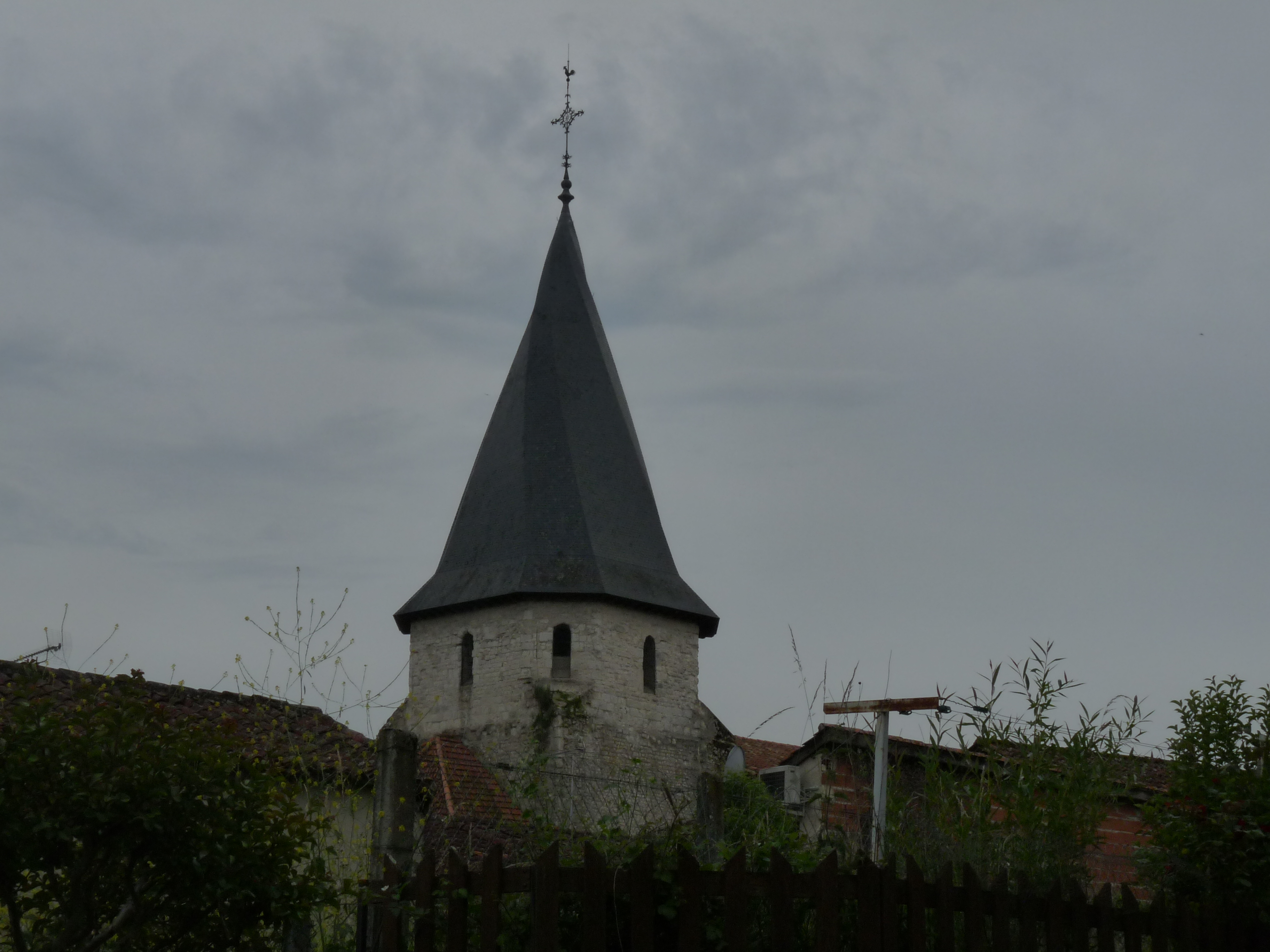
- The church tower in Sérignac-sur-Garonne
- Location of Sérignac-sur-Garonne
- Location within France Location within Nouvelle-Aquitaine
- Coordinates: 44°12′52″N 0°29′09″E
- Country: France
- Region: Nouvelle-Aquitaine
- Department: Lot-et-Garonne
- Arrondissement: Agen
- Canton: L'Ouest agenais
- Intercommunality: Agglomération d'Agen

Government
  - Mayor (2020–2026): Jean Dreuil
- Area^{1}: 8.91 km^{2} (3.44 sq mi)
- Elevation: 42 m (138 ft)
- Highest elevation: 117 m (384 ft)
- Lowest elevation: 32 m (105 ft)
- Population (2023): 1,182
  - Density: 133/km^{2} (344/sq mi)
- Time zone: UTC+01:00 (CET)
  - Summer (DST): UTC+02:00 (CEST)
- INSEE/Postal code: 47300 /47310
- ^{1} French Land Register data, which excludes lakes, ponds, glaciers > 1 km^{2} (0.386 sq mi or 247 acres) and river estuaries.

Sérignac-sur-Garonne (French pronunciation: [seʁiɲak syʁ ɡaʁɔn], literally Sérignac on Garonne; Occitan: Serinhac) is a commune in the Lot-et-Garonne department in south-western France.

== See also ==
- Communes of the Lot-et-Garonne department
