= Colayrac-Saint-Cirq =

- Commune
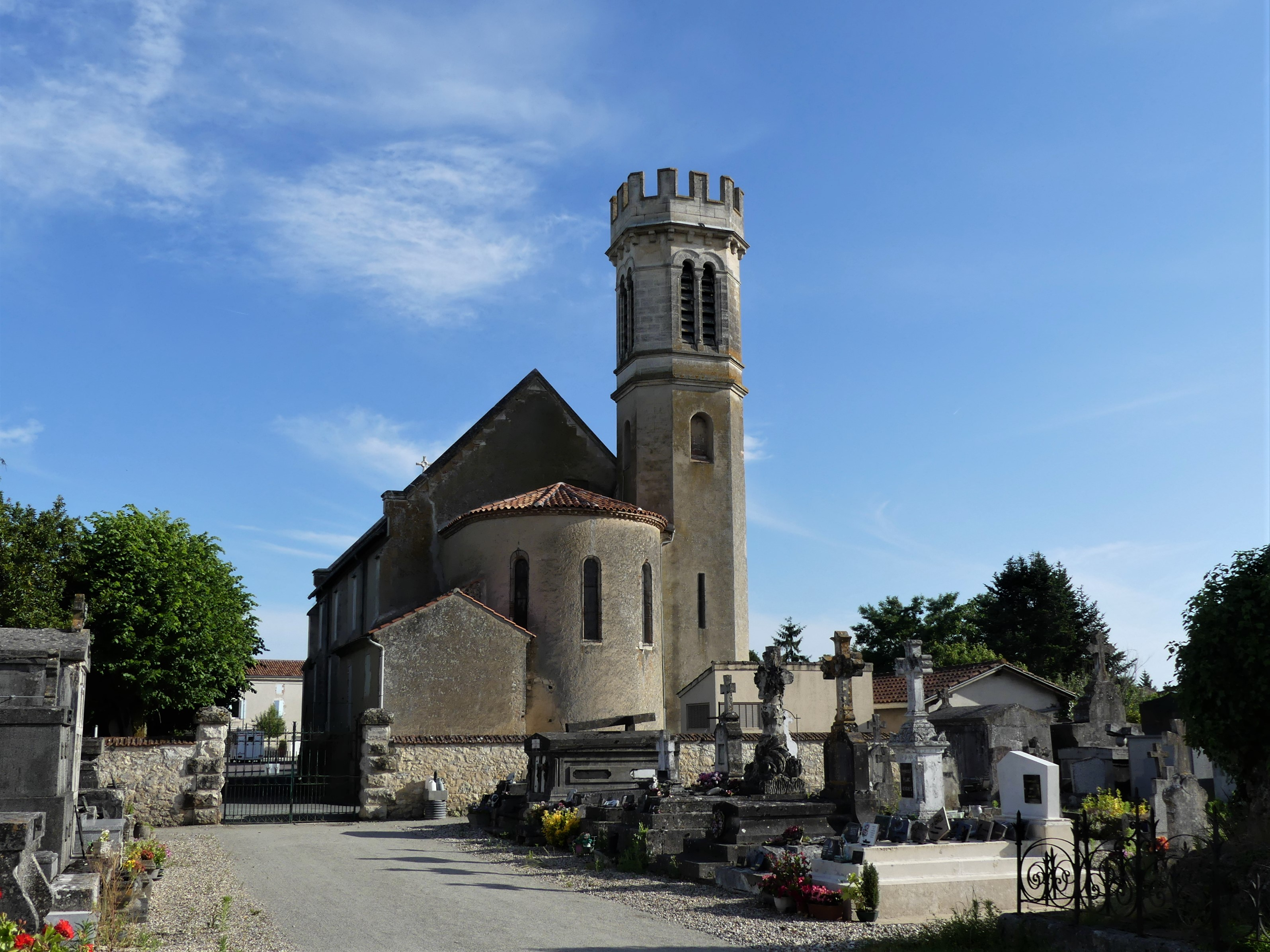
- Church of the Immaculate Conception of the Virgin Mary

- Coat of arms
- Location of Colayrac-Saint-Cirq
- Location within France Location within Nouvelle-Aquitaine
- Coordinates: 44°13′14″N 0°33′13″E
- Country: France
- Region: Nouvelle-Aquitaine
- Department: Lot-et-Garonne
- Arrondissement: Agen
- Canton: L'Ouest agenais
- Intercommunality: Agglomération d'Agen

Government
  - Mayor (2020–2026): Pascal de Sermet
- Area^{1}: 21.36 km^{2} (8.25 sq mi)
- Elevation: 150 m (490 ft)
- Highest elevation: 187 m (614 ft)
- Lowest elevation: 32 m (105 ft)
- Population (2023): 3,095
  - Density: 144.9/km^{2} (375.3/sq mi)
- Time zone: UTC+01:00 (CET)
  - Summer (DST): UTC+02:00 (CEST)
- INSEE/Postal code: 47069 /47450
- ^{1} French Land Register data, which excludes lakes, ponds, glaciers > 1 km^{2} (0.386 sq mi or 247 acres) and river estuaries.

Colayrac-Saint-Cirq (French pronunciation: [kɔlɛʁak sɛ̃ siʁk]; Occitan: Colairac e Sent Circ) is a commune in the Lot-et-Garonne department in south-western France.

== Population ==
Historical population
Year	Pop.	±% p.a.
1968	2,329	—
1975	2,551	+1.31%
1982	2,645	+0.52%
1990	2,653	+0.04%
1999	2,717	+0.27%
2007	2,841	+0.56%
2012	2,867	+0.18%
2017	3,074	+1.40%
2023	3,095	+0.11%
Source: INSEE

== Twin towns ==
Colayrac-Saint-Cirq is twinned with:

- San Fior, Italy

== See also ==
- Communes of the Lot-et-Garonne department
