= Foulayronnes =

- Commune
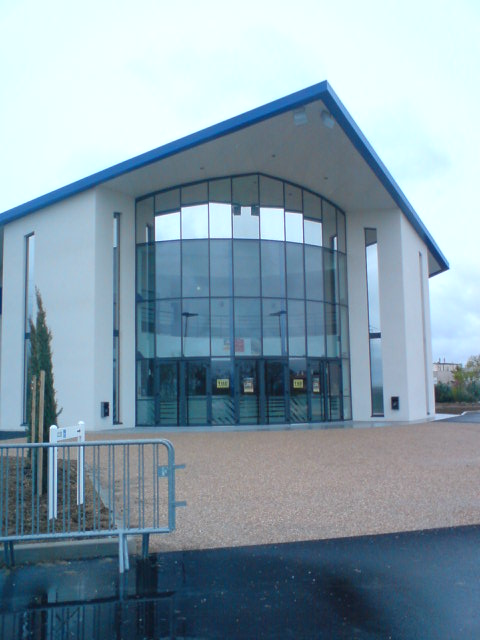
- The cultural centre in Foulayronnes

- Coat of arms
- Location of Foulayronnes
- Location within France Location within Nouvelle-Aquitaine
- Coordinates: 44°14′26″N 0°38′55″E
- Country: France
- Region: Nouvelle-Aquitaine
- Department: Lot-et-Garonne
- Arrondissement: Agen
- Canton: Agen-1
- Intercommunality: Agglomération d'Agen

Government
  - Mayor (2020–2026): Bruno Dubos
- Area^{1}: 28.86 km^{2} (11.14 sq mi)
- Highest elevation: 206 m (676 ft)
- Lowest elevation: 44 m (144 ft)
- Population (2023): 5,476
  - Density: 189.7/km^{2} (491.4/sq mi)
- Demonym: Foulayronnais
- Time zone: UTC+01:00 (CET)
  - Summer (DST): UTC+02:00 (CEST)
- INSEE/Postal code: 47100 /47510
- ^{1} French Land Register data, which excludes lakes, ponds, glaciers > 1 km^{2} (0.386 sq mi or 247 acres) and river estuaries.

Foulayronnes (French pronunciation: [fulɛjʁɔn]; Occitan: Folaironas) is a commune in the Lot-et-Garonne department in south-western France.

== Population ==
Historical population
Year	Pop.	±% p.a.
1968	1,997	—
1975	2,567	+3.65%
1982	3,046	+2.47%
1990	4,343	+4.53%
1999	4,597	+0.63%
2007	4,902	+0.81%
2012	5,167	+1.06%
2017	5,430	+1.00%
2023	5,476	+0.14%
Source: INSEE

== See also ==
- Communes of the Lot-et-Garonne department
