= Dondas =

- Commune
- Coat of arms
- Location of Dondas
- Location within France Location within Nouvelle-Aquitaine
- Coordinates: 44°15′15″N 0°50′23″E
- Country: France
- Region: Nouvelle-Aquitaine
- Department: Lot-et-Garonne
- Arrondissement: Agen
- Canton: Le Pays de Serres
- Intercommunality: Agglomération d'Agen

Government
  - Mayor (2020–2026): Serge Berthoumieux
- Area^{1}: 14.37 km^{2} (5.55 sq mi)
- Elevation: 177 m (581 ft)
- Highest elevation: 222 m (728 ft)
- Lowest elevation: 75 m (246 ft)
- Population (2023): 219
  - Density: 15.2/km^{2} (39.5/sq mi)
- Time zone: UTC+01:00 (CET)
  - Summer (DST): UTC+02:00 (CEST)
- INSEE/Postal code: 47082 /47470
- ^{1} French Land Register data, which excludes lakes, ponds, glaciers > 1 km^{2} (0.386 sq mi or 247 acres) and river estuaries.

Dondas is a commune in the Lot-et-Garonne department in south-western France. Its area is 14.37 km^{2} with about 214 inhabitants.

== See also ==
- Communes of the Lot-et-Garonne department
