= Canton of L'Ouest agenais =

Administrative division of Lot-et-Garonne, France

Coordinates: 44.22°N 0.55°E

The canton of L'Ouest agenais is an administrative division of the Lot-et-Garonne department, southwestern France. It was created at the French canton reorganisation which came into effect in March 2015. Its seat is in Colayrac-Saint-Cirq.

It consists of the following communes:

1. Aubiac
2. Brax
3. Colayrac-Saint-Cirq
4. Estillac
5. Laplume
6. Marmont-Pachas
7. Moirax
8. Roquefort
9. Sainte-Colombe-en-Bruilhois
10. Saint-Hilaire-de-Lusignan
11. Sérignac-sur-Garonne
