= Layrac =

Layrac Lairac (Occitan)
- Commune
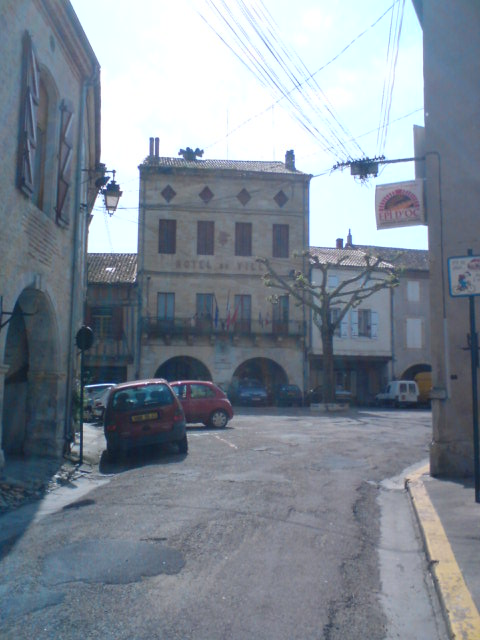
- The town hall in Layrac

- Coat of arms
- Location of Layrac
- Location within France Location within Nouvelle-Aquitaine
- Coordinates: 44°08′05″N 0°39′45″E
- Country: France
- Region: Nouvelle-Aquitaine
- Department: Lot-et-Garonne
- Arrondissement: Agen
- Canton: Le Sud-Est agenais
- Intercommunality: Agglomération d'Agen

Government
  - Mayor (2025–2026): Thierry Pilliaudin
- Area^{1}: 38.11 km^{2} (14.71 sq mi)
- Elevation: 52 m (171 ft)
- Highest elevation: 182 m (597 ft)
- Lowest elevation: 43 m (141 ft)
- Population (2023): 4,010
  - Density: 105/km^{2} (273/sq mi)
- Time zone: UTC+01:00 (CET)
  - Summer (DST): UTC+02:00 (CEST)
- INSEE/Postal code: 47145 /47390
- ^{1} French Land Register data, which excludes lakes, ponds, glaciers > 1 km^{2} (0.386 sq mi or 247 acres) and river estuaries.

Layrac (French pronunciation: [lɛʁak]; Languedocien: Lairac) is a commune in the Lot-et-Garonne department in south-western France.

== Population ==
Historical population
Year	Pop.	±% p.a.
1968	2,635	—
1975	2,520	−0.64%
1982	2,800	+1.52%
1990	2,983	+0.79%
1999	3,149	+0.60%
2007	3,457	+1.17%
2012	3,532	+0.43%
2017	3,623	+0.51%
2023	4,010	+1.71%
Source: INSEE

== See also ==
- Communes of the Lot-et-Garonne department
