= Caudecoste =

- Commune
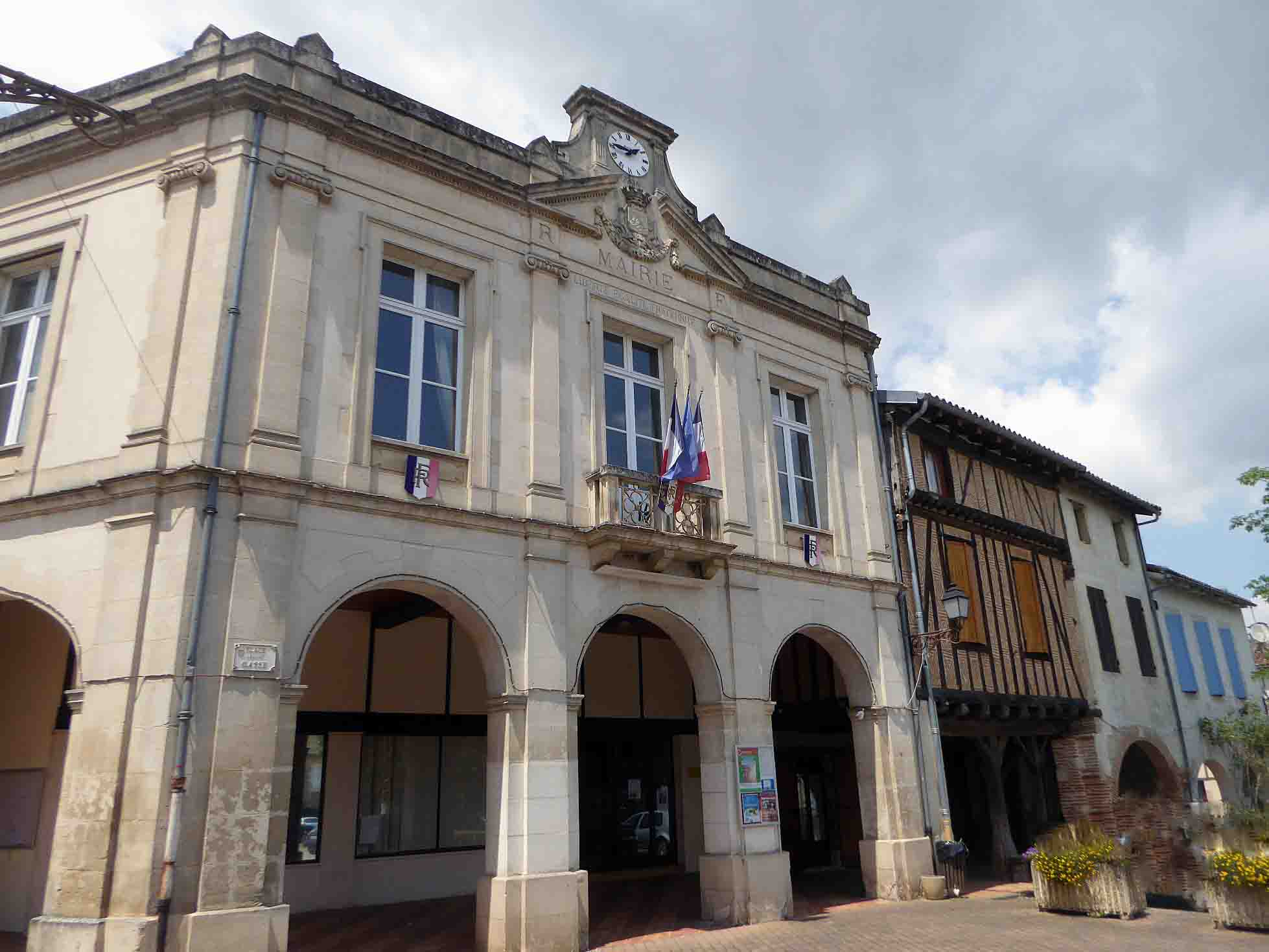
- Caudecoste Town hall

- Coat of arms
- Location of Caudecoste
- Location within France Location within Nouvelle-Aquitaine
- Coordinates: 44°07′04″N 0°44′15″E
- Country: France
- Region: Nouvelle-Aquitaine
- Department: Lot-et-Garonne
- Arrondissement: Agen
- Canton: Le Sud-Est agenais
- Intercommunality: Agglomération d'Agen

Government
  - Mayor (2020–2026): François Dailledouze
- Area^{1}: 17.13 km^{2} (6.61 sq mi)
- Elevation: 65 m (213 ft)
- Highest elevation: 120 m (390 ft)
- Lowest elevation: 46 m (151 ft)
- Population (2023): 1,127
  - Density: 65.79/km^{2} (170.4/sq mi)
- Time zone: UTC+01:00 (CET)
  - Summer (DST): UTC+02:00 (CEST)
- INSEE/Postal code: 47060 /47220
- ^{1} French Land Register data, which excludes lakes, ponds, glaciers > 1 km^{2} (0.386 sq mi or 247 acres) and river estuaries.

Caudecoste (French pronunciation: [kɔdəkɔst]; Occitan: Cadacòsta) is a commune in the Lot-et-Garonne department in south-western France.

== Geography ==
The river Auroue forms all of the commune's eastern border and the Garonne part of its northern border.

== See also ==
- Communes of the Lot-et-Garonne department
