= Sauveterre-Saint-Denis =

- Commune
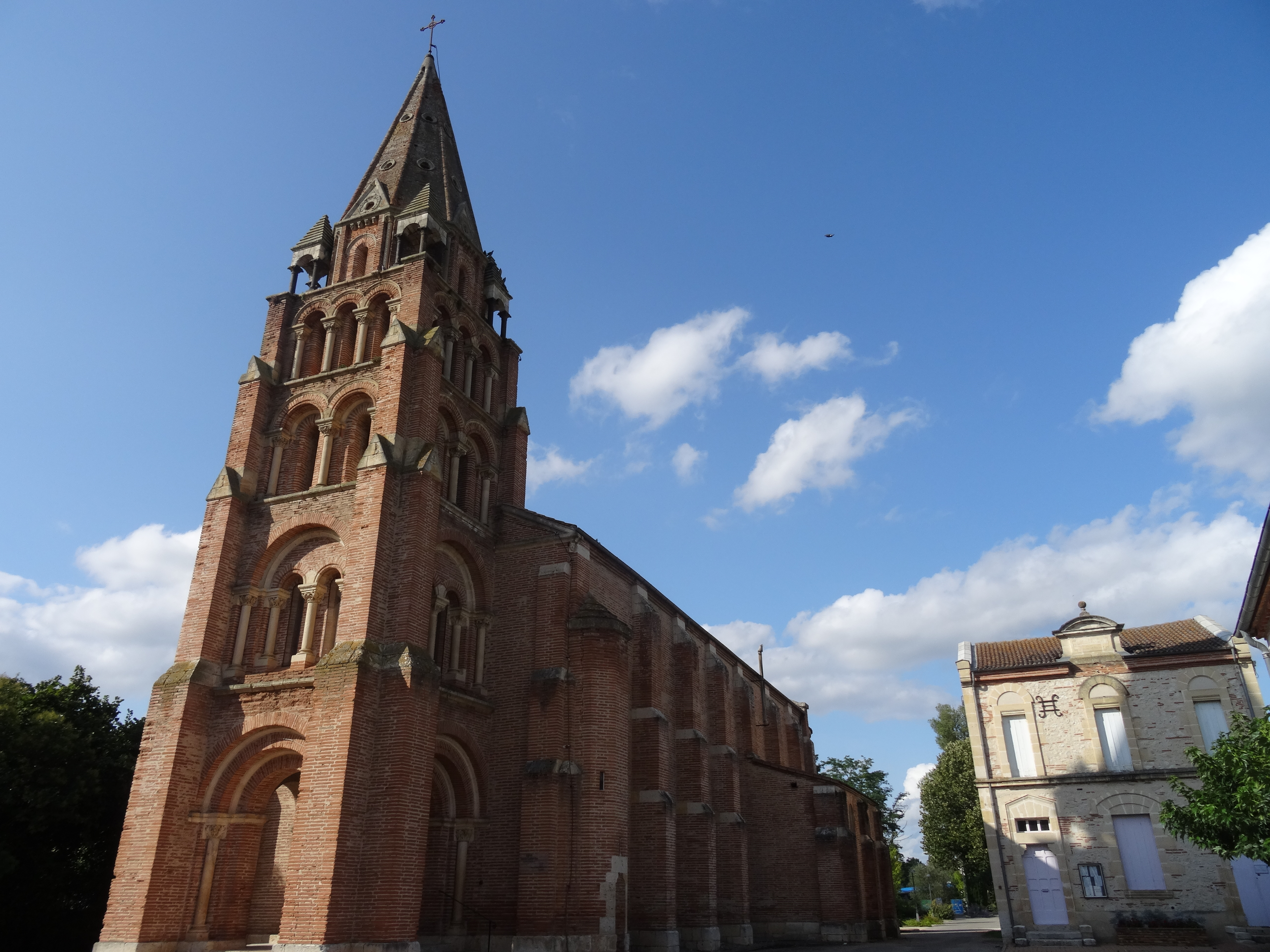
- The church in Sauveterre-Saint-Denis
- Location of Sauveterre-Saint-Denis
- Location within France Location within Nouvelle-Aquitaine
- Coordinates: 44°09′19″N 0°42′27″E
- Country: France
- Region: Nouvelle-Aquitaine
- Department: Lot-et-Garonne
- Arrondissement: Agen
- Canton: Le Sud-Est agenais
- Intercommunality: Agglomération d'Agen

Government
  - Mayor (2020–2026): Max Laborie
- Area^{1}: 8.25 km^{2} (3.19 sq mi)
- Elevation: 53 m (174 ft)
- Highest elevation: 53 m (174 ft)
- Lowest elevation: 45 m (148 ft)
- Population (2023): 387
  - Density: 46.9/km^{2} (121/sq mi)
- Time zone: UTC+01:00 (CET)
  - Summer (DST): UTC+02:00 (CEST)
- INSEE/Postal code: 47293 /47220
- ^{1} French Land Register data, which excludes lakes, ponds, glaciers > 1 km^{2} (0.386 sq mi or 247 acres) and river estuaries.

Sauveterre-Saint-Denis (French pronunciation: [sovtɛʁ sɛ̃ dəni]; Languedocien: Sauvatèrra e Sent Danís) is a commune in the Lot-et-Garonne department in south-western France.

== See also ==
- Communes of the Lot-et-Garonne department
