= Aubiac, Lot-et-Garonne =

Aubiac
- Commune
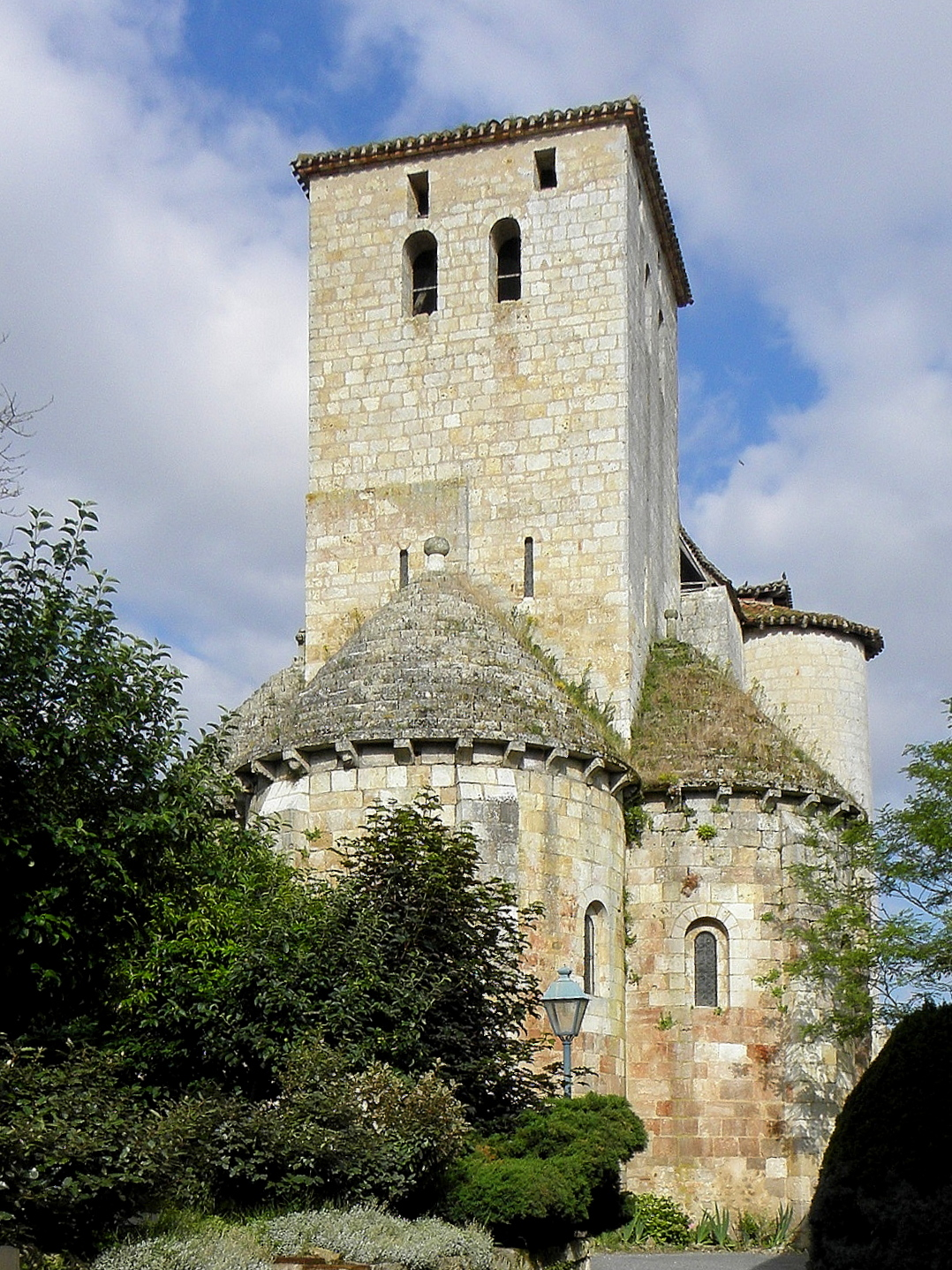
- The church in Aubiac
- Location of Aubiac
- Location within France Location within Nouvelle-Aquitaine
- Coordinates: 44°08′32″N 0°33′42″E
- Country: France
- Region: Nouvelle-Aquitaine
- Department: Lot-et-Garonne
- Arrondissement: Agen
- Canton: L'Ouest agenais
- Intercommunality: Agglomération d'Agen

Government
  - Mayor (2020–2026): Jean-Marc Causse
- Area^{1}: 13.86 km^{2} (5.35 sq mi)
- Elevation: 107 m (351 ft)
- Highest elevation: 180 m (590 ft)
- Lowest elevation: 69 m (226 ft)
- Population (2023): 1,174
  - Density: 84.70/km^{2} (219.4/sq mi)
- Time zone: UTC+01:00 (CET)
  - Summer (DST): UTC+02:00 (CEST)
- INSEE/Postal code: 47016 /47310
- ^{1} French Land Register data, which excludes lakes, ponds, glaciers > 1 km^{2} (0.386 sq mi or 247 acres) and river estuaries.

Aubiac (French pronunciation: [objak]) is a commune in the Lot-et-Garonne department in southwestern France.

== Population ==
Historical population
Year	Pop.	±% p.a.
1968	366	—
1975	468	+3.57%
1982	680	+5.48%
1990	826	+2.46%
1999	904	+1.01%
2007	991	+1.16%
2012	1,050	+1.16%
2017	1,119	+1.28%
2023	1,174	+0.80%
Source: INSEE

== See also ==
- Communes of the Lot-et-Garonne department
