= Sauvagnas =

- Commune
- Coat of arms
- Location of Sauvagnas
- Location within France Location within Nouvelle-Aquitaine
- Coordinates: 44°15′02″N 0°44′22″E
- Country: France
- Region: Nouvelle-Aquitaine
- Department: Lot-et-Garonne
- Arrondissement: Agen
- Canton: Le Sud-Est agenais
- Intercommunality: Agglomération d'Agen

Government
  - Mayor (2020–2026): Nadine Labournerie
- Area^{1}: 13.57 km^{2} (5.24 sq mi)
- Elevation: 207 m (679 ft)
- Highest elevation: 209 m (686 ft)
- Lowest elevation: 86 m (282 ft)
- Population (2023): 519
  - Density: 38.2/km^{2} (99.1/sq mi)
- Time zone: UTC+01:00 (CET)
  - Summer (DST): UTC+02:00 (CEST)
- INSEE/Postal code: 47288 /47340
- ^{1} French Land Register data, which excludes lakes, ponds, glaciers > 1 km^{2} (0.386 sq mi or 247 acres) and river estuaries.

Sauvagnas is a commune in the Lot-et-Garonne department in south-western France.

== See also ==
- Communes of the Lot-et-Garonne department
