= Saint-Caprais-de-Lerm =

- Commune
- Location of Saint-Caprais-de-Lerm
- Location within France Location within Nouvelle-Aquitaine
- Coordinates: 44°12′50″N 0°44′40″E
- Country: France
- Region: Nouvelle-Aquitaine
- Department: Lot-et-Garonne
- Arrondissement: Agen
- Canton: Le Sud-Est agenais
- Intercommunality: Agglomération d'Agen

Government
  - Mayor (2020–2026): Cécile Genovesio
- Area^{1}: 13.6 km^{2} (5.3 sq mi)
- Elevation: 76 m (249 ft)
- Highest elevation: 195 m (640 ft)
- Lowest elevation: 58 m (190 ft)
- Population (2023): 713
  - Density: 52.4/km^{2} (136/sq mi)
- Time zone: UTC+01:00 (CET)
  - Summer (DST): UTC+02:00 (CEST)
- INSEE/Postal code: 47234 /47270
- ^{1} French Land Register data, which excludes lakes, ponds, glaciers > 1 km^{2} (0.386 sq mi or 247 acres) and river estuaries.

Saint-Caprais-de-Lerm (French pronunciation: [sɛ̃ kapʁɛ də lɛʁm]; Languedocien: Sent Grapasi de l'Èrm) is a commune in the Lot-et-Garonne department in south-western France.

== See also ==
- Communes of the Lot-et-Garonne department
