= Saint-Nicolas-de-la-Balerme =

- Commune
- Location of Saint-Nicolas-de-la-Balerme
- Location within France Location within Nouvelle-Aquitaine
- Coordinates: 44°08′15″N 0°45′51″E
- Country: France
- Region: Nouvelle-Aquitaine
- Department: Lot-et-Garonne
- Arrondissement: Agen
- Canton: Le Sud-Est agenais
- Intercommunality: Agglomération d'Agen

Government
  - Mayor (2020–2026): Jean-Marie Robert
- Area^{1}: 4.72 km^{2} (1.82 sq mi)
- Elevation: 52 m (171 ft)
- Highest elevation: 73 m (240 ft)
- Lowest elevation: 45 m (148 ft)
- Population (2023): 424
  - Density: 89.8/km^{2} (233/sq mi)
- Time zone: UTC+01:00 (CET)
  - Summer (DST): UTC+02:00 (CEST)
- INSEE/Postal code: 47262 /47220
- ^{1} French Land Register data, which excludes lakes, ponds, glaciers > 1 km^{2} (0.386 sq mi or 247 acres) and river estuaries.

Saint-Nicolas-de-la-Balerme (French pronunciation: [sɛ̃ nikɔla də la balɛʁm]; Occitan: Sent Micolau de la Val Èrma) is a commune in the Lot-et-Garonne department in south-western France.

== Geography ==
The river Auroue forms all of the commune's eastern border, then flows into the Garonne, which forms all of its northern border.

== See also ==
- Communes of the Lot-et-Garonne department
