= Cuq, Lot-et-Garonne =

Cuq
- Commune
- Location of Cuq
- Location within France Location within Nouvelle-Aquitaine
- Coordinates: 44°05′02″N 0°41′56″E
- Country: France
- Region: Nouvelle-Aquitaine
- Department: Lot-et-Garonne
- Arrondissement: Agen
- Canton: Le Sud-Est agenais
- Intercommunality: Agglomération d'Agen

Government
  - Mayor (2020–2026): Joël Guatta
- Area^{1}: 16.89 km^{2} (6.52 sq mi)
- Elevation: 161 m (528 ft)
- Highest elevation: 180 m (590 ft)
- Lowest elevation: 63 m (207 ft)
- Population (2023): 278
  - Density: 16.5/km^{2} (42.6/sq mi)
- Time zone: UTC+01:00 (CET)
  - Summer (DST): UTC+02:00 (CEST)
- INSEE/Postal code: 47076 /47220
- ^{1} French Land Register data, which excludes lakes, ponds, glaciers > 1 km^{2} (0.386 sq mi or 247 acres) and river estuaries.

Cuq (French pronunciation: [kyk]; Occitan: Cuc) is a commune in the Lot-et-Garonne department in south-western France with about 280 inhabitants. The local windmill has been restored twice after 300 years of inactivity, first in 1997 and again in 2012, so that it can produce flour and its oven can bake bread.

== Geography ==
The river Auroue forms all of the commune's eastern border.

== Demography ==
Historical population
Year	Pop.	±% p.a.
1968	246	—
1975	253	+0.40%
1982	257	+0.22%
1990	238	−0.96%
1999	254	+0.73%
2007	241	−0.65%
2012	281	+3.12%
2017	268	−0.94%
2023	278	+0.61%
Source: INSEE

== See also ==
- Communes of the Lot-et-Garonne department
