= Tayrac, Lot-et-Garonne =

Tayrac
- Commune
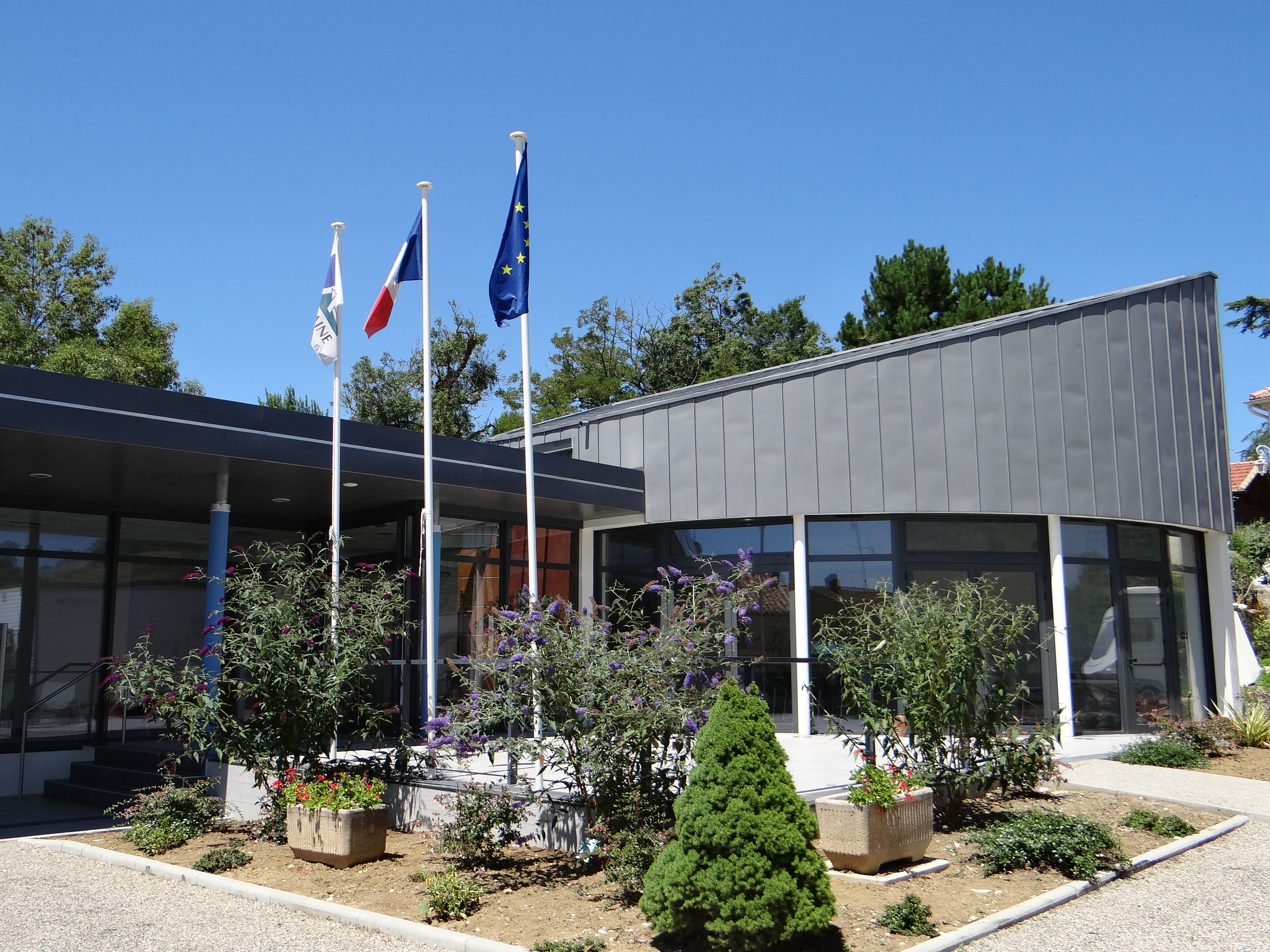
- The town hall in Tayrac

- Coat of arms
- Location of Tayrac
- Location within France Location within Nouvelle-Aquitaine
- Coordinates: 44°11′53″N 0°50′33″E
- Country: France
- Region: Nouvelle-Aquitaine
- Department: Lot-et-Garonne
- Arrondissement: Agen
- Canton: Le Pays de Serres
- Intercommunality: Agglomération d'Agen

Government
  - Mayor (2020–2026): Thierry Delpech
- Area^{1}: 12.89 km^{2} (4.98 sq mi)
- Elevation: 195 m (640 ft)
- Highest elevation: 193 m (633 ft)
- Lowest elevation: 62 m (203 ft)
- Population (2023): 381
  - Density: 29.6/km^{2} (76.6/sq mi)
- Time zone: UTC+01:00 (CET)
  - Summer (DST): UTC+02:00 (CEST)
- INSEE/Postal code: 47305 /47270
- ^{1} French Land Register data, which excludes lakes, ponds, glaciers > 1 km^{2} (0.386 sq mi or 247 acres) and river estuaries.

Tayrac (French pronunciation: [tɛʁak]; Occitan: Tairac) is a commune in the Lot-et-Garonne department in south-western France.

== Geography ==
The Séoune forms the commune's southern border.

== See also ==
- Communes of the Lot-et-Garonne department
