= Fals, Lot-et-Garonne =

Fals
- Commune
- Location of Fals
- Location within France Location within Nouvelle-Aquitaine
- Coordinates: 44°05′38″N 0°40′32″E
- Country: France
- Region: Nouvelle-Aquitaine
- Department: Lot-et-Garonne
- Arrondissement: Agen
- Canton: Le Sud-Est agenais
- Intercommunality: Agglomération d'Agen

Government
  - Mayor (2020–2026): Jean-Pierre Benazet
- Area^{1}: 9.4 km^{2} (3.6 sq mi)
- Elevation: 180 m (590 ft)
- Highest elevation: 176 m (577 ft)
- Lowest elevation: 49 m (161 ft)
- Population (2023): 403
  - Density: 43/km^{2} (110/sq mi)
- Time zone: UTC+01:00 (CET)
  - Summer (DST): UTC+02:00 (CEST)
- INSEE/Postal code: 47092 /47220
- ^{1} French Land Register data, which excludes lakes, ponds, glaciers > 1 km^{2} (0.386 sq mi or 247 acres) and river estuaries.

Fals is a commune in the Lot-et-Garonne department in south-western France.

== See also ==
- Communes of the Lot-et-Garonne department
