= Lafox =

- Commune
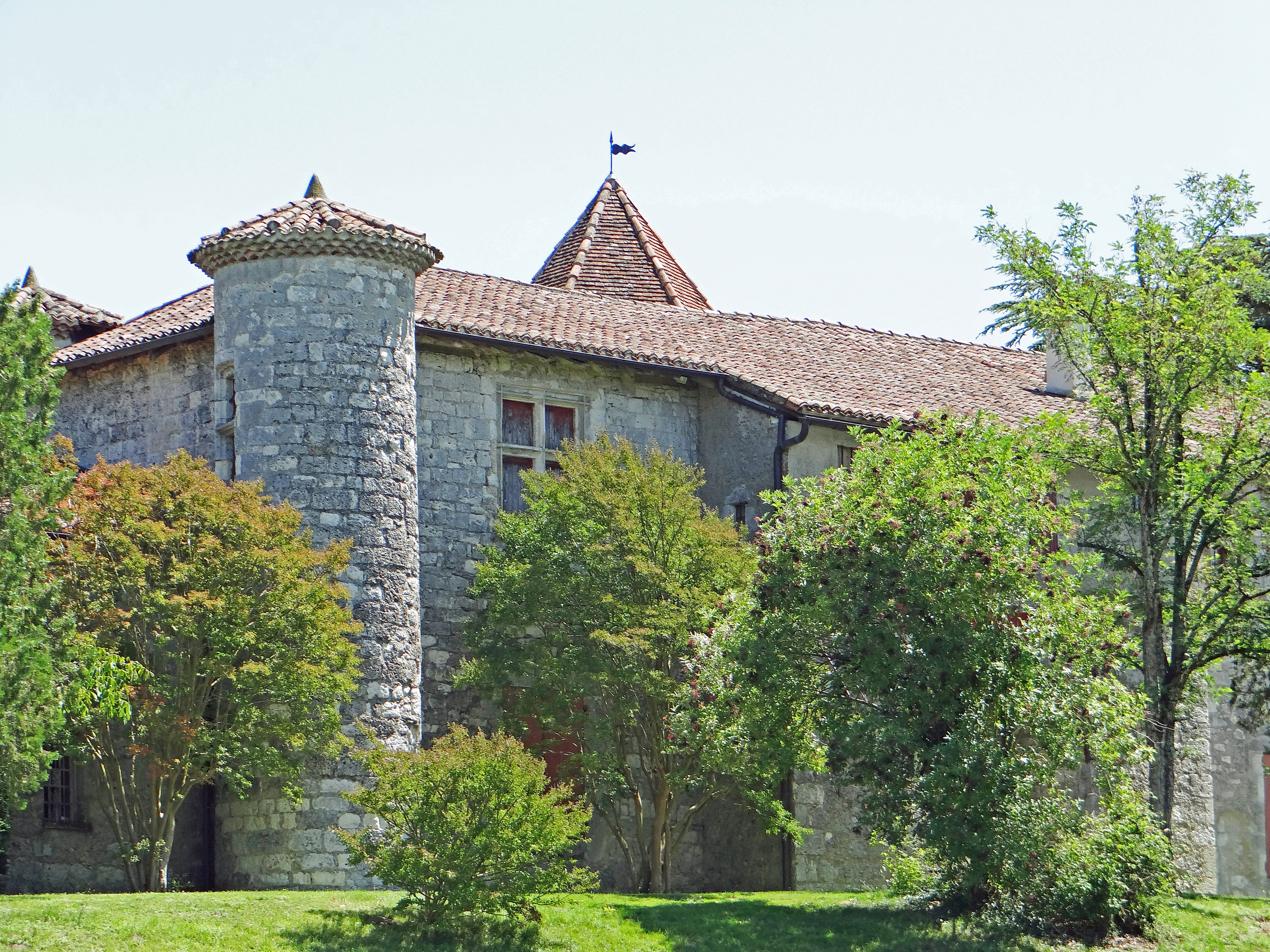
- Prades Manor in Lafox

- Coat of arms
- Location of Lafox
- Location within France Location within Nouvelle-Aquitaine
- Coordinates: 44°10′10″N 0°42′07″E
- Country: France
- Region: Nouvelle-Aquitaine
- Department: Lot-et-Garonne
- Arrondissement: Agen
- Canton: Le Sud-Est agenais
- Intercommunality: Agglomération d'Agen

Government
  - Mayor (2020–2026): Yohan Verdié
- Area^{1}: 5.23 km^{2} (2.02 sq mi)
- Elevation: 53 m (174 ft)
- Highest elevation: 146 m (479 ft)
- Lowest elevation: 45 m (148 ft)
- Population (2023): 1,098
  - Density: 210/km^{2} (544/sq mi)
- Time zone: UTC+01:00 (CET)
  - Summer (DST): UTC+02:00 (CEST)
- INSEE/Postal code: 47128 /47240
- ^{1} French Land Register data, which excludes lakes, ponds, glaciers > 1 km^{2} (0.386 sq mi or 247 acres) and river estuaries.

Lafox is a commune in the Lot-et-Garonne department in south-western France.

== Geography ==
It lies in the Garonne valley on the N113, the road from Bordeaux to Toulouse, to the east of Agen. It is connected to Agen by both the N113 and a cycle path beside the canal.

The Séoune forms most of the commune's north-eastern border, flows west-southwestward through the middle of the commune, forms part of its western border, then flows into the Garonne, which forms the commune's southern border.

== See also ==
- Communes of the Lot-et-Garonne department
