= Marmont-Pachas =

- Commune
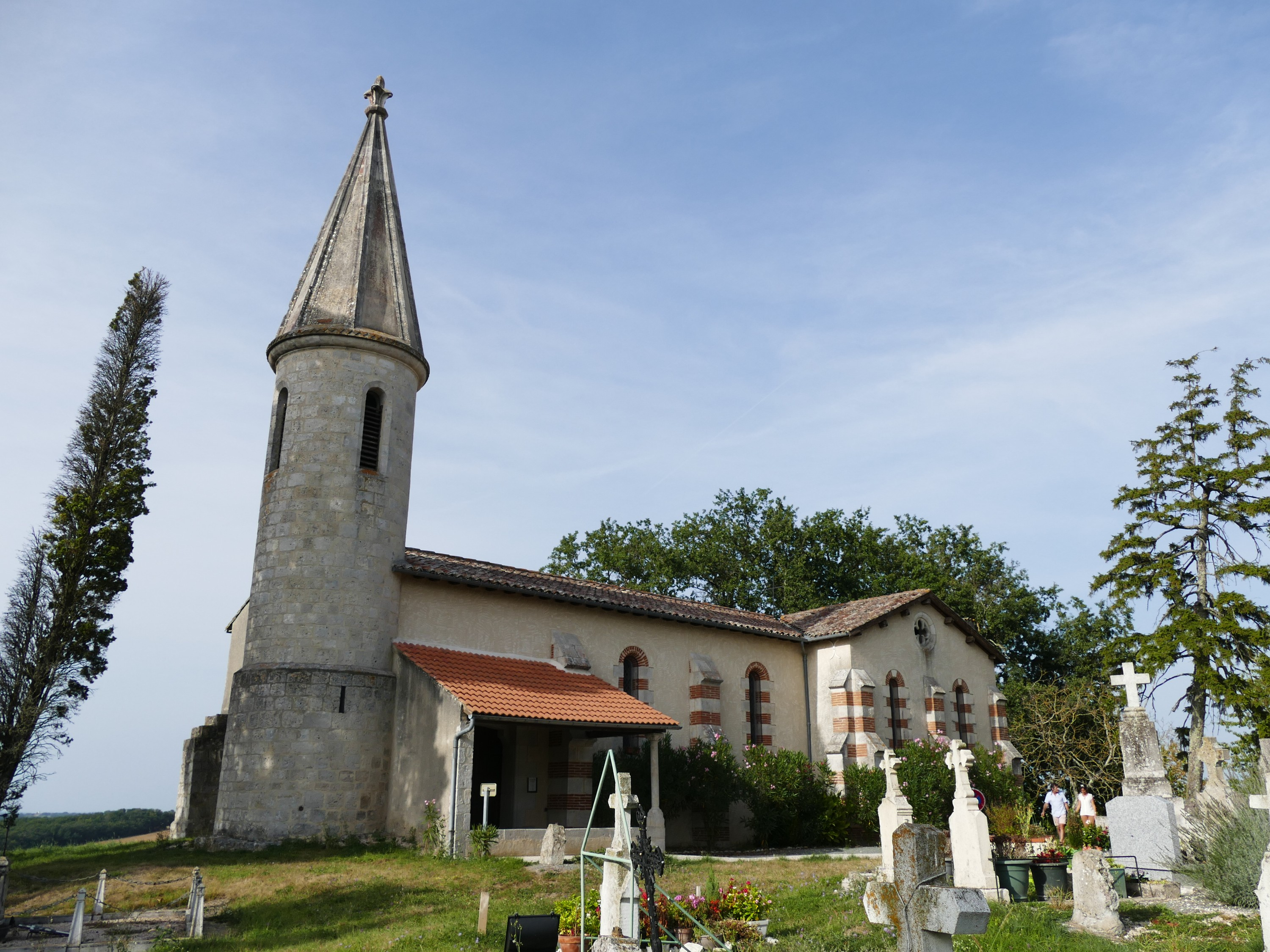

- Coat of arms
- Location of Marmont-Pachas
- Location within France Location within Nouvelle-Aquitaine
- Coordinates: 44°05′23″N 0°35′15″E
- Country: France
- Region: Nouvelle-Aquitaine
- Department: Lot-et-Garonne
- Arrondissement: Agen
- Canton: L'Ouest agenais
- Intercommunality: Agglomération d'Agen

Government
  - Mayor (2020–2026): Philippe Degryse
- Area^{1}: 7.96 km^{2} (3.07 sq mi)
- Elevation: 192 m (630 ft)
- Highest elevation: 196 m (643 ft)
- Lowest elevation: 103 m (338 ft)
- Population (2023): 157
  - Density: 19.7/km^{2} (51.1/sq mi)
- Time zone: UTC+01:00 (CET)
  - Summer (DST): UTC+02:00 (CEST)
- INSEE/Postal code: 47158 /47220
- ^{1} French Land Register data, which excludes lakes, ponds, glaciers > 1 km^{2} (0.386 sq mi or 247 acres) and river estuaries.

Marmont-Pachas (Occitan: Pashas) is a commune in the Lot-et-Garonne department in south-western France.

== See also ==
- Communes of the Lot-et-Garonne department
