= Roquefort, Lot-et-Garonne =

Roquefort
- Commune
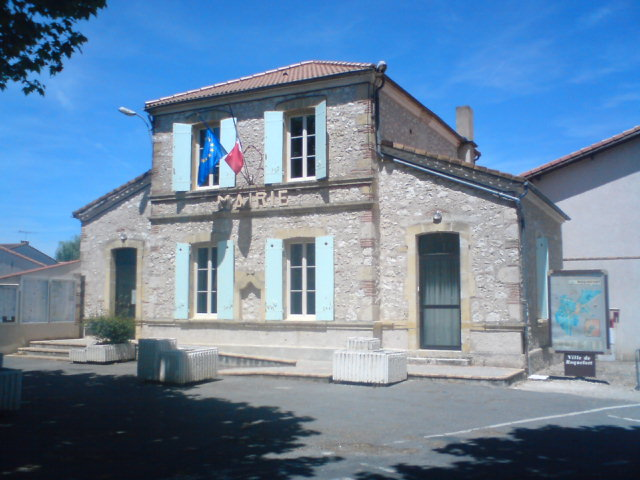
- The town hall in Roquefort

- Coat of arms
- Location of Roquefort
- Location within France Location within Nouvelle-Aquitaine
- Coordinates: 44°10′30″N 0°33′38″E
- Country: France
- Region: Nouvelle-Aquitaine
- Department: Lot-et-Garonne
- Arrondissement: Agen
- Canton: L'Ouest agenais
- Intercommunality: Agglomération d'Agen

Government
  - Mayor (2021–2026): Patrice Fournier
- Area^{1}: 7.53 km^{2} (2.91 sq mi)
- Elevation: 70 m (230 ft)
- Highest elevation: 156 m (512 ft)
- Lowest elevation: 53 m (174 ft)
- Population (2023): 2,078
  - Density: 276/km^{2} (715/sq mi)
- Time zone: UTC+01:00 (CET)
  - Summer (DST): UTC+02:00 (CEST)
- INSEE/Postal code: 47225 /47310
- ^{1} French Land Register data, which excludes lakes, ponds, glaciers > 1 km^{2} (0.386 sq mi or 247 acres) and river estuaries.

Roquefort (French pronunciation: [ʁɔkfɔʁ]; Occitan: Ròcafòrt) is a commune in the Lot-et-Garonne department in south-western France.

== Population ==
Historical population
| Year | Pop. | ±% p.a. |
|---|---|---|
| 1968 | 497 | — |
| 1975 | 573 | +2.05% |
| 1982 | 737 | +3.66% |
| 1990 | 980 | +3.63% |
| 1999 | 1,198 | +2.26% |
| 2007 | 1,654 | +4.11% |
| 2012 | 1,868 | +2.46% |
| 2017 | 1,885 | +0.18% |
| 2023 | 2,078 | +1.64% |
Source: INSEE

== See also ==
- Communes of the Lot-et-Garonne department
