= Saint-Sixte, Lot-et-Garonne =

Saint-Sixte
- Commune
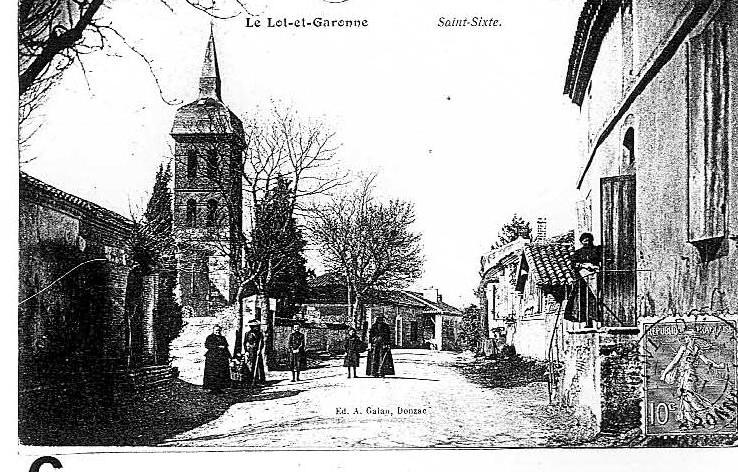
- Saint-Sixte in the early 20th century

- Coat of arms
- Location of Saint-Sixte
- Location within France Location within Nouvelle-Aquitaine
- Coordinates: 44°07′45″N 0°47′02″E
- Country: France
- Region: Nouvelle-Aquitaine
- Department: Lot-et-Garonne
- Arrondissement: Agen
- Canton: Le Sud-Est agenais
- Intercommunality: Agglomération d'Agen

Government
  - Mayor (2020–2026): David Sanchez
- Area^{1}: 5.92 km^{2} (2.29 sq mi)
- Elevation: 70 m (230 ft)
- Highest elevation: 71 m (233 ft)
- Lowest elevation: 45 m (148 ft)
- Population (2023): 363
  - Density: 61.3/km^{2} (159/sq mi)
- Time zone: UTC+01:00 (CET)
  - Summer (DST): UTC+02:00 (CEST)
- INSEE/Postal code: 47279 /47220
- ^{1} French Land Register data, which excludes lakes, ponds, glaciers > 1 km^{2} (0.386 sq mi or 247 acres) and river estuaries.

Saint-Sixte (French pronunciation: [sɛ̃ sikst]; Languedocien: Sant Sixt) is a commune in the Lot-et-Garonne department in south-western France.

== Geography ==
The river Auroue forms all of the commune's western border, then flows into the Garonne, which forms all of its northern border.

== History ==
Situated between the Garonne and Auroue rivers, the village of Saint-Sixte was once populated primarily by boatmen. Consequently, it was built in a long, linear layout, facing the river it overlooked.

For a long time, the Garonne served as the only commercial "route" between Toulouse and Bordeaux; the village was therefore established as close to the riverbanks as possible. It served as a towing stop, and in the 13th century, many boatmen lived in the localities known as "Le Double" and "Port de Bonneau." These sites housed a chapel dedicated to Saint Catherine—the patron saint of boatmen—and a feudal castle occupied in 1304 by the lord Jourdain de l'Isle. While the plague epidemic of 1631 played a role, the frequency and severity of floods were the primary factors that gradually drove the inhabitants to move further inland. To keep an eye on the river without suffering its inconveniences, they built their homes on higher ground along the first rise, with their entrances facing the Garonne—explaining the village's elongated layout. A bustling hamlet grew up around the area, home to boatmen, merchants, ropemakers, laborers, stonemasons, and carpenters. River transport shaped the rhythm of the inhabitants' lives. A ferry transported people, livestock, and goods to the right bank; it ceased operations in 1858 following the opening of the Saint-Nicolas suspension bridge.

The great flood of 1875 dealt a fatal blow to the river trade and the village of "Le Double." Major infrastructure projects—such as the lateral canal, the railway, and new bridges—led to the irreversible decline of Saint-Sixte’s small river port. It is in memory of this era that the village square was named "Place de la Batellerie" (Boatmen's Square). The church known as the "Mariners' Church" (*église des Mariniers*) was dedicated around 1500 to Saint Sixtus II, a 3rd-century pope martyred under Emperor Valerian. At the time, the building belonged to the parish of the Barony of Dunes. Parts of the chancel are thought to date back to the 13th century. The current bell tower—distinctive for the region—dates from 1830. The Chapel of Saint Catherine was rebuilt alongside it and consecrated in 1822. It had previously been destroyed at the "Double" site by the flood of 1751, rebuilt at a location known as "Lancelabarre," and subsequently decommissioned in 1793. In 1875, the village's boatmen presented their patron saint with an *ex-voto*—a magnificent model of a cutter—which is now classified as a historical monument and can be viewed in the nave.

Until the flood of 1875, Saint-Sixte was a thriving river port driven by trade and river transport. *Gabares* (traditional flat-bottomed barges) would moor at the villages of Le Double and Port-de-Bonneau. The former was completely destroyed during the flood; all that remains of the latter today are a few substantial houses along the banks of the Garonne.

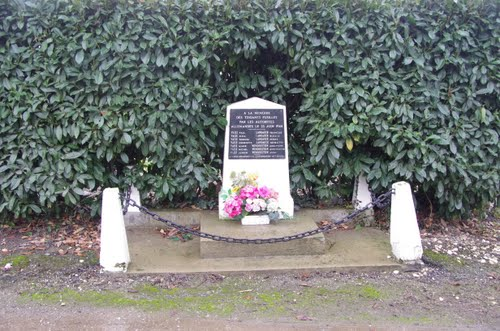
Memorial stele for the massacre of the Gypsies

On the morning of June 23, 1944, fourteen Gypsy fairground workers—eight adults (François Landauer, Henriette Landauer, Adolphine Vaise, Alfred Vaise, Henriette Weiss, Marie Weiss, Anna Vanderstein, Antoinette Vanderstein) and six children (Pierre Landauer, Rosalie Landauer, Elisa Vaise, Michel Weiss, Paul Weiss, Thérèse Weiss)—were executed by the Waffen-SS. The same unit that, later that day, would hang twelve people in the neighboring village of Dunes.

== See also ==
- Communes of the Lot-et-Garonne department
