= Arrondissement of Agen =

Coordinates: 44.20°N 0.62°E

Agen
- Arrondissement
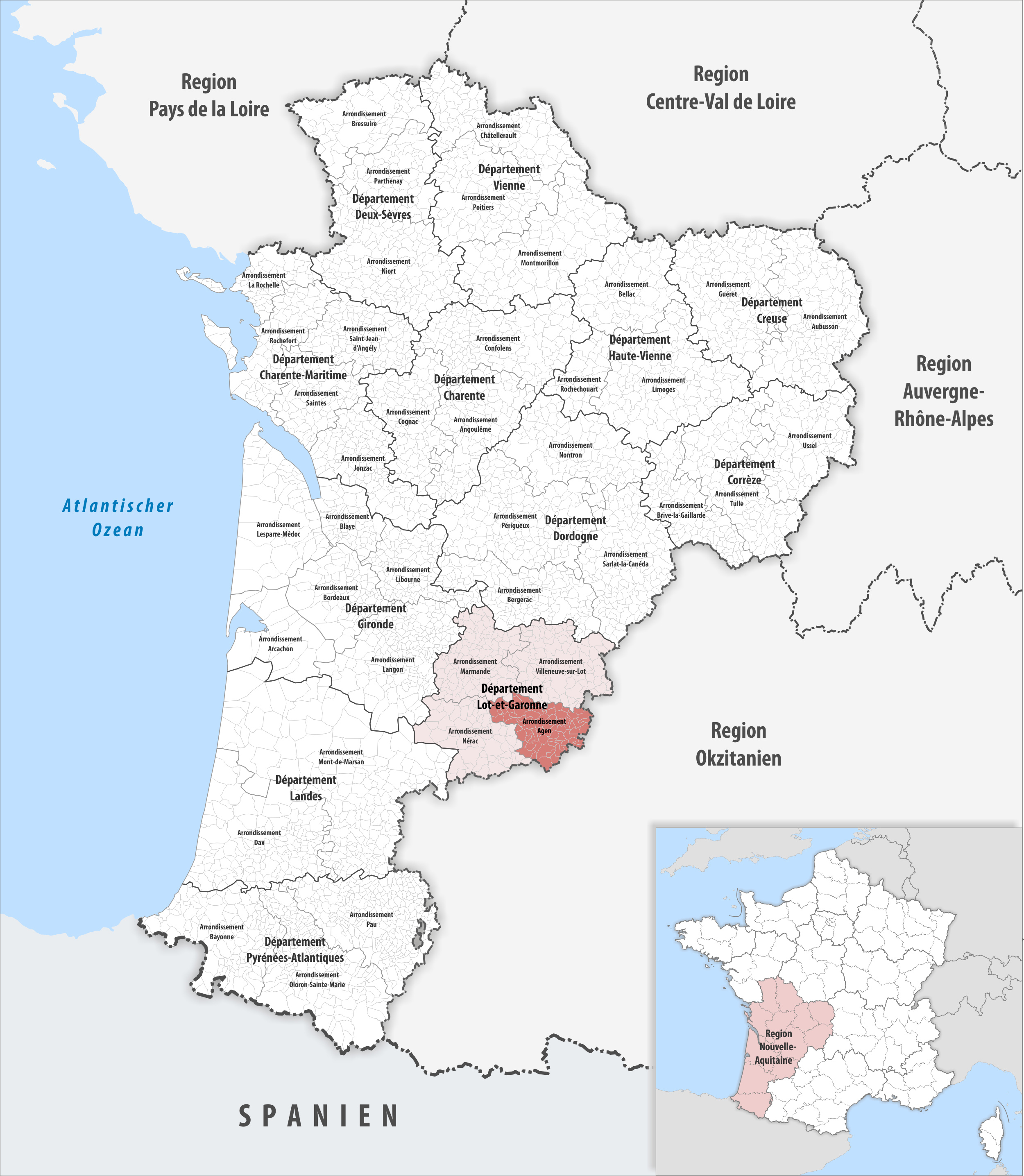
- Location within the region Nouvelle-Aquitaine
- Country: France
- Region: Nouvelle-Aquitaine
- Department: Lot-et-Garonne
- No. of communes: {{{nbcomm}}}
- Area: 1,013.3 km^{2} (391.2 sq mi)
- Population (2023): 120,719
  - Density: 119.13/km^{2} (308.56/sq mi)
- INSEE code: 471

The arrondissement of Agen is an arrondissement of France in the Lot-et-Garonne department in the Nouvelle-Aquitaine region. It has 71 communes. Its population is 119,948 (2021), and its area is 1,013.3 km^{2} (391.2 sq mi).

== Composition ==
The communes of the arrondissement of Agen, and their INSEE codes, are:

1. Agen (47001)
2. Aiguillon (47004)
3. Astaffort (47015)
4. Aubiac (47016)
5. Bajamont (47019)
6. Bazens (47022)
7. Beauville (47025)
8. Blaymont (47030)
9. Boé (47031)
10. Bon-Encontre (47032)
11. Bourran (47038)
12. Brax (47040)
13. Cassignas (47050)
14. Castelculier (47051)
15. Castella (47053)
16. Caudecoste (47060)
17. Cauzac (47062)
18. Clermont-Dessous (47066)
19. Clermont-Soubiran (47067)
20. Colayrac-Saint-Cirq (47069)
21. Cours (47073)
22. La Croix-Blanche (47075)
23. Cuq (47076)
24. Dondas (47082)
25. Engayrac (47087)
26. Estillac (47091)
27. Fals (47092)
28. Foulayronnes (47100)
29. Frégimont (47104)
30. Galapian (47107)
31. Granges-sur-Lot (47111)
32. Grayssas (47113)
33. Lacépède (47125)
34. Lafox (47128)
35. Lagarrigue (47129)
36. Laplume (47137)
37. Laroque-Timbaut (47138)
38. Laugnac (47140)
39. Layrac (47145)
40. Lusignan-Petit (47154)
41. Madaillan (47155)
42. Marmont-Pachas (47158)
43. Moirax (47169)
44. Monbalen (47171)
45. Montpezat (47190)
46. Nicole (47196)
47. Le Passage (47201)
48. Pont-du-Casse (47209)
49. Port-Sainte-Marie (47210)
50. Prayssas (47213)
51. Puymirol (47217)
52. Roquefort (47225)
53. Saint-Caprais-de-Lerm (47234)
54. Sainte-Colombe-en-Bruilhois (47238)
55. Saint-Hilaire-de-Lusignan (47246)
56. Saint-Jean-de-Thurac (47248)
57. Saint-Martin-de-Beauville (47255)
58. Saint-Maurin (47260)
59. Saint-Nicolas-de-la-Balerme (47262)
60. Saint-Pierre-de-Clairac (47269)
61. Saint-Robert (47273)
62. Saint-Romain-le-Noble (47274)
63. Saint-Salvy (47275)
64. Saint-Sardos (47276)
65. Saint-Sixte (47279)
66. Saint-Urcisse (47281)
67. Sauvagnas (47288)
68. La Sauvetat-de-Savères (47289)
69. Sauveterre-Saint-Denis (47293)
70. Sérignac-sur-Garonne (47300)
71. Tayrac (47305)

== History ==
The arrondissement of Agen was created in 1800.

As a result of the reorganisation of the cantons of France which came into effect in 2015, the borders of the cantons are no longer related to the borders of the arrondissements. The cantons of the arrondissement of Agen were, as of January 2015:

1. Agen-Centre
2. Agen-Nord
3. Agen-Nord-Est
4. Agen-Ouest
5. Agen-Sud-Est
6. Astaffort
7. Beauville
8. Laplume
9. Laroque-Timbaut
10. Port-Sainte-Marie
11. Prayssas
12. Puymirol
