= Grayssas =

- Commune
- Location of Grayssas
- Location within France Location within Nouvelle-Aquitaine
- Coordinates: 44°09′57″N 0°52′31″E
- Country: France
- Region: Nouvelle-Aquitaine
- Department: Lot-et-Garonne
- Arrondissement: Agen
- Canton: Le Sud-Est agenais
- Intercommunality: Deux Rives

Government
  - Mayor (2020–2026): Marie-Christine Cluchier
- Area^{1}: 9.37 km^{2} (3.62 sq mi)
- Elevation: 160 m (520 ft)
- Highest elevation: 195 m (640 ft)
- Lowest elevation: 64 m (210 ft)
- Population (2023): 150
  - Density: 16/km^{2} (41/sq mi)
- Time zone: UTC+01:00 (CET)
  - Summer (DST): UTC+02:00 (CEST)
- INSEE/Postal code: 47113 /47270
- ^{1} French Land Register data, which excludes lakes, ponds, glaciers > 1 km^{2} (0.386 sq mi or 247 acres) and river estuaries.

Grayssas is a commune in the Lot-et-Garonne department in south-western France.

== See also ==
- Communes of the Lot-et-Garonne department
