= Astaffort =

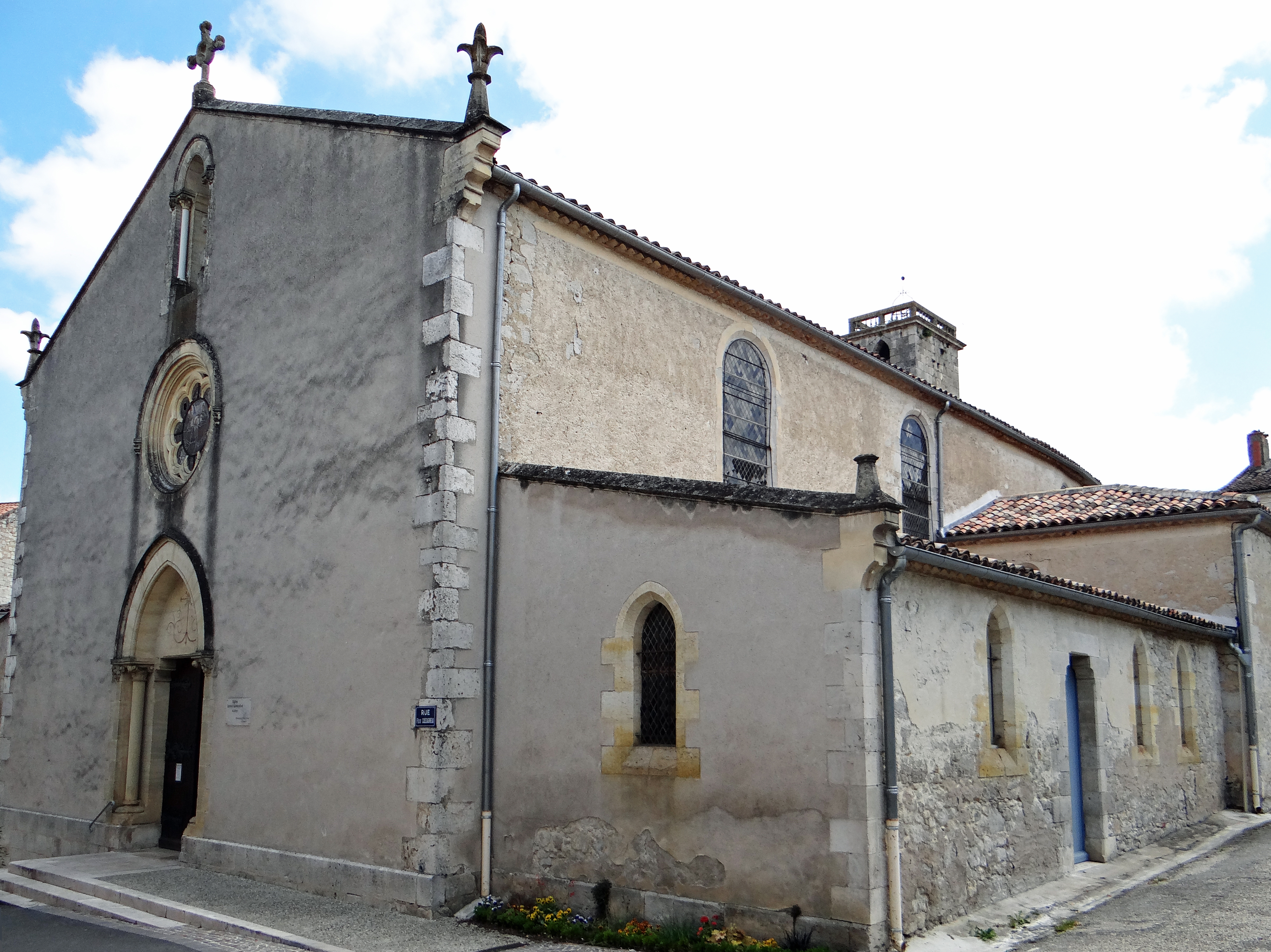
- Église Sainte-Geneviève

- Coat of arms
- Location of Astaffort
- Location within France Location within Nouvelle-Aquitaine
- Coordinates: 44°03′54″N 0°39′08″E
- Country: France
- Region: Nouvelle-Aquitaine
- Department: Lot-et-Garonne
- Arrondissement: Agen
- Canton: Le Sud-Est agenais
- Intercommunality: Agglomération d'Agen

Government
  - Mayor (2020–2026): Paul Bonnet
- Area^{1}: 35.17 km^{2} (13.58 sq mi)
- Elevation: 59 m (194 ft)
- Highest elevation: 215 m (705 ft)
- Lowest elevation: 52 m (171 ft)
- Population (2023): 1,972
  - Density: 56.07/km^{2} (145.2/sq mi)
- Time zone: UTC+01:00 (CET)
  - Summer (DST): UTC+02:00 (CEST)
- INSEE/Postal code: 47015 /47220
- ^{1} French Land Register data, which excludes lakes, ponds, glaciers > 1 km^{2} (0.386 sq mi or 247 acres) and river estuaries.

Astaffort (French pronunciation: [astafɔʁ]; Occitan: Astahòrt) is a commune in the Lot-et-Garonne department in southwestern France. It is situated on the river Gers, about 15 km south of Agen. Astaffort has a mill and the church of Sainte-Geneviève.

== Population ==
Historical population

Year	Pop.	±% p.a.
1793	2,729	—
1821	2,631	−0.13%
1846	2,581	−0.08%
1872	2,511	−0.11%
1901	1,960	−0.85%
1926	1,707	−0.55%
1946	1,700	−0.02%
1962	1,792	+0.33%
1968	1,740	−0.49%

Year	Pop.	±% p.a.
1975	1,802	+0.50%
1982	1,835	+0.26%
1990	1,828	−0.05%
1999	1,880	+0.31%
2007	2,002	+0.79%
2012	2,036	+0.34%
2017	2,050	+0.14%
2023	1,972	−0.64%

Source: EHESS and INSEE (1968–2023)

== Personalities ==
The popular singer-songwriter Francis Cabrel spent his childhood in Astaffort.

== See also ==
- Communes of the Lot-et-Garonne department
