= Brax, Lot-et-Garonne =

Brax
- Commune
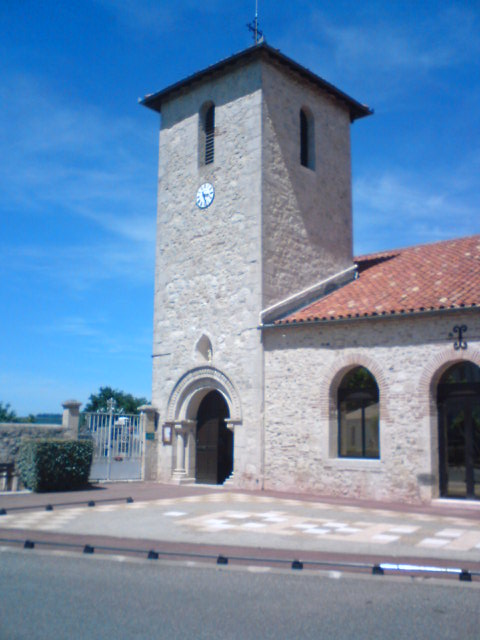
- The church in Brax

- Coat of arms
- Location of Brax
- Location within France Location within Nouvelle-Aquitaine
- Coordinates: 44°12′14″N 0°33′09″E
- Country: France
- Region: Nouvelle-Aquitaine
- Department: Lot-et-Garonne
- Arrondissement: Agen
- Canton: L'Ouest agenais
- Intercommunality: Agglomération d'Agen

Government
  - Mayor (2020–2026): Joël Ponsolle
- Area^{1}: 8.8 km^{2} (3.4 sq mi)
- Elevation: 110 m (360 ft)
- Highest elevation: 60 m (200 ft)
- Lowest elevation: 35 m (115 ft)
- Population (2023): 2,098
  - Density: 240/km^{2} (620/sq mi)
- Time zone: UTC+01:00 (CET)
  - Summer (DST): UTC+02:00 (CEST)
- INSEE/Postal code: 47040 /47310
- ^{1} French Land Register data, which excludes lakes, ponds, glaciers > 1 km^{2} (0.386 sq mi or 247 acres) and river estuaries.

Brax (French pronunciation: [bʁaks]; Occitan: Brats) is a commune in the Lot-et-Garonne department in southwestern France.

== Population ==
Historical population
Year	Pop.	±% p.a.
1968	675	—
1975	774	+1.97%
1982	1,109	+5.27%
1990	1,370	+2.68%
1999	1,615	+1.84%
2007	1,760	+1.08%
2012	1,946	+2.03%
2017	2,070	+1.24%
2023	2,098	+0.22%
Source: INSEE

== See also ==
- Communes of the Lot-et-Garonne department
