= Bajamont =

- Commune
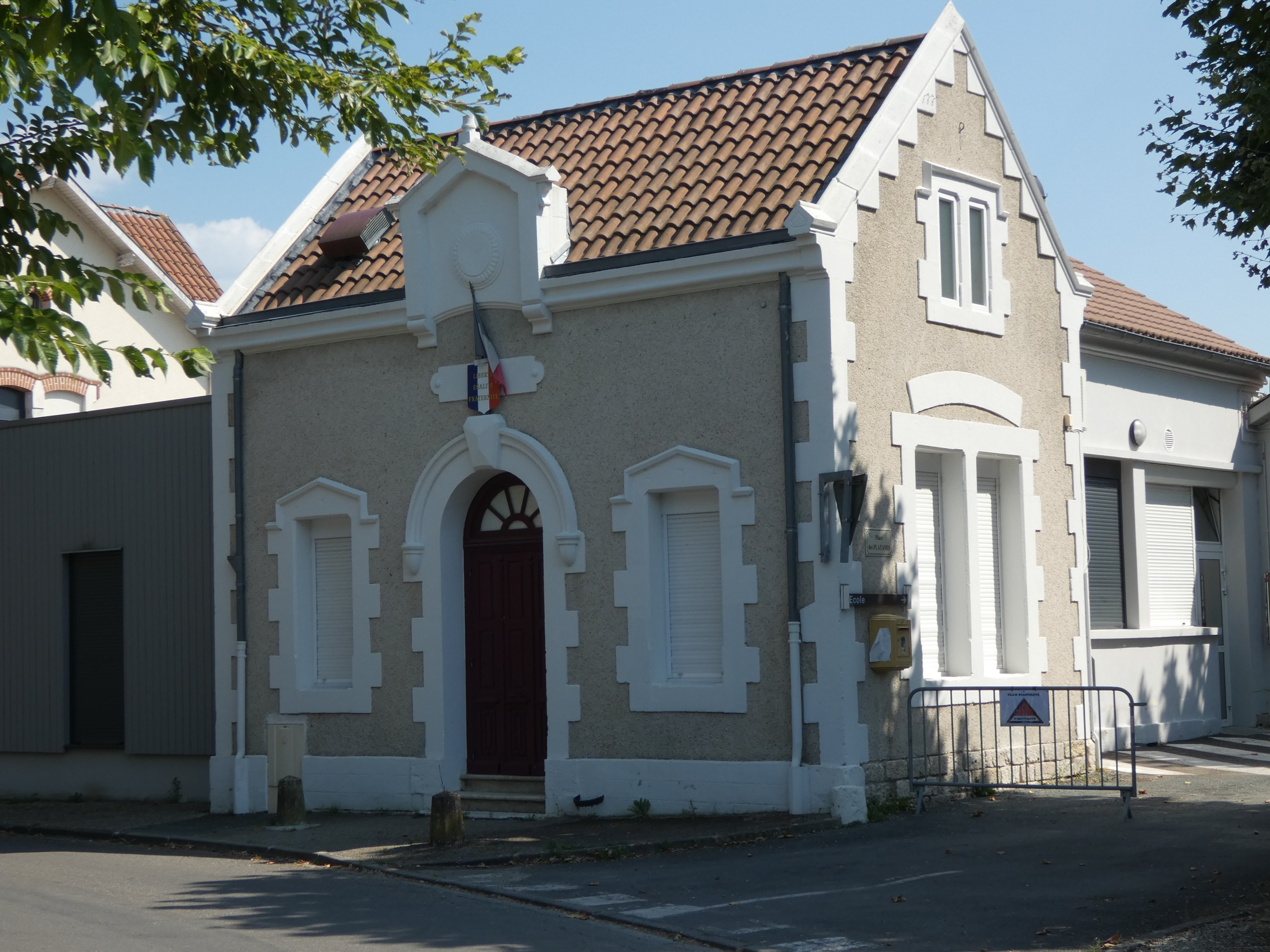
- Bajamont Town hall

- Coat of arms
- Location of Bajamont
- Location within France Location within Nouvelle-Aquitaine
- Coordinates: 44°15′57″N 0°42′18″E
- Country: France
- Region: Nouvelle-Aquitaine
- Department: Lot-et-Garonne
- Arrondissement: Agen
- Canton: Agen-1
- Intercommunality: Agglomération d'Agen

Government
  - Mayor (2020–2026): Patrick Buisson
- Area^{1}: 12.2 km^{2} (4.7 sq mi)
- Elevation: 63 m (207 ft)
- Highest elevation: 211 m (692 ft)
- Lowest elevation: 64 m (210 ft)
- Population (2023): 1,034
  - Density: 84.8/km^{2} (220/sq mi)
- Time zone: UTC+01:00 (CET)
  - Summer (DST): UTC+02:00 (CEST)
- INSEE/Postal code: 47019 /47480
- ^{1} French Land Register data, which excludes lakes, ponds, glaciers > 1 km^{2} (0.386 sq mi or 247 acres) and river estuaries.

Bajamont (French pronunciation: [baʒamɔ̃]) is a commune in the Lot-et-Garonne department in southwestern France.

== Population ==
Historical population
Year	Pop.	±% p.a.
1968	362	—
1975	455	+3.32%
1982	607	+4.20%
1990	857	+4.41%
1999	931	+0.92%
2007	901	−0.41%
2012	960	+1.28%
2017	978	+0.37%
2023	1,034	+0.93%
Source: INSEE

== See also ==
- Communes of the Lot-et-Garonne department
