= Agglomération d'Agen =

- Communauté d'agglomération
- Location of Agen within the department
- Country: France
- Region: Nouvelle-Aquitaine
- Department: Lot-et-Garonne
- No. of communes: {{{nbcomm}}}
- Established: 2022

Government
  - President (2020–2026): Jean Dionis du Séjour
- Area: 653 km^{2} (252 sq mi)
- Population (2013): 103,761
  - Density: 159/km^{2} (412/sq mi)
- Website: www.agglo-agen.net

Agglomération d'Agen is an agglomeration community, an administrative entity, in the Nouvelle-Aquitaine, in southern France. Administrative center: Agen. It was expanded in January 2013 by the mergers of communauté de communes du canton de Laplume-en-Bruilhois, and the commune Pont-du-Casse. It was further expanded in January 2022 by the merger of the community of communes Porte d'Aquitaine en Pays de Serres.

The agglomeration community of Agen covers 44 communes, and has a population of approximately 104,000. It is the largest agglomeration community in Lot-et-Garonne.

== Communes ==
The 44 communes:

1. Agen
2. Astaffort
3. Aubiac
4. Bajamont
5. Beauville
6. Blaymont
7. Boé
8. Bon-Encontre
9. Brax
10. Castelculier
11. Caudecoste
12. Cauzac
13. Colayrac-Saint-Cirq
14. Cuq
15. Dondas
16. Engayrac
17. Estillac
18. Fals
19. Foulayronnes
20. Lafox
21. Laplume
22. Layrac
23. Marmont-Pachas
24. Moirax
25. Le Passage
26. Pont-du-Casse
27. Puymirol
28. Roquefort
29. Saint-Caprais-de-Lerm
30. Sainte-Colombe-en-Bruilhois
31. Saint-Hilaire-de-Lusignan
32. Saint-Jean-de-Thurac
33. Saint-Martin-de-Beauville
34. Saint-Maurin
35. Saint-Nicolas-de-la-Balerme
36. Saint-Pierre-de-Clairac
37. Saint-Romain-le-Noble
38. Saint-Sixte
39. Saint-Urcisse
40. Sauvagnas
41. La Sauvetat-de-Savères
42. Sauveterre-Saint-Denis
43. Sérignac-sur-Garonne
44. Tayrac
