= Sainte-Colombe-en-Bruilhois =

- Commune
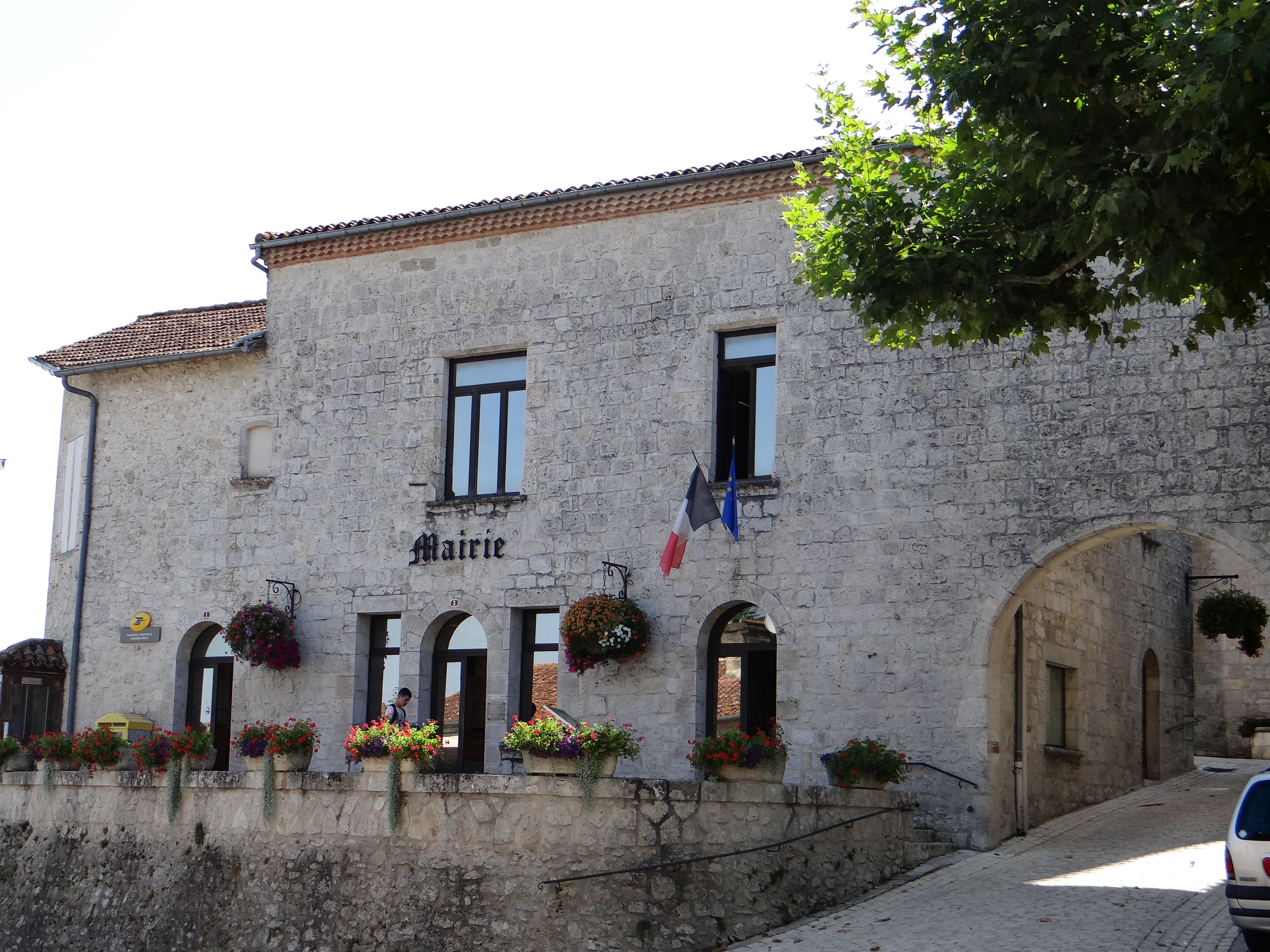
- Sainte-Colombe-en-Bruilhois Town hall

- Coat of arms
- Location of Sainte-Colombe-en-Bruilhois
- Location within France Location within Nouvelle-Aquitaine
- Coordinates: 44°10′43″N 0°30′59″E
- Country: France
- Region: Nouvelle-Aquitaine
- Department: Lot-et-Garonne
- Arrondissement: Agen
- Canton: L'Ouest agenais
- Intercommunality: Agglomération d'Agen

Government
  - Mayor (2023–2026): Dominique Milani
- Area^{1}: 21.15 km^{2} (8.17 sq mi)
- Elevation: 167 m (548 ft)
- Highest elevation: 168 m (551 ft)
- Lowest elevation: 35 m (115 ft)
- Population (2023): 1,546
  - Density: 73.10/km^{2} (189.3/sq mi)
- Time zone: UTC+01:00 (CET)
  - Summer (DST): UTC+02:00 (CEST)
- INSEE/Postal code: 47238 /47310
- ^{1} French Land Register data, which excludes lakes, ponds, glaciers > 1 km^{2} (0.386 sq mi or 247 acres) and river estuaries.

Sainte-Colombe-en-Bruilhois (Occitan: Senta Coloma de Brulhés) is a commune in the Lot-et-Garonne department in south-western France.

== See also ==
- Communes of the Lot-et-Garonne department
