= Saint-Urcisse, Lot-et-Garonne =

Saint-Urcisse
- Commune
- Coat of arms
- Location of Saint-Urcisse
- Location within France Location within Nouvelle-Aquitaine
- Coordinates: 44°09′42″N 0°49′09″E
- Country: France
- Region: Nouvelle-Aquitaine
- Department: Lot-et-Garonne
- Arrondissement: Agen
- Canton: Le Sud-Est agenais
- Intercommunality: Agglomération d'Agen

Government
  - Mayor (2020–2026): Richard Doumergue
- Area^{1}: 10.93 km^{2} (4.22 sq mi)
- Elevation: 57 m (187 ft)
- Highest elevation: 186 m (610 ft)
- Lowest elevation: 59 m (194 ft)
- Population (2023): 242
  - Density: 22.1/km^{2} (57.3/sq mi)
- Time zone: UTC+01:00 (CET)
  - Summer (DST): UTC+02:00 (CEST)
- INSEE/Postal code: 47281 /47270
- ^{1} French Land Register data, which excludes lakes, ponds, glaciers > 1 km^{2} (0.386 sq mi or 247 acres) and river estuaries.

Saint-Urcisse (French pronunciation: [sɛ̃.t‿yʁsis]; Languedocien: Sent Orsisi) is a commune in the Lot-et-Garonne department in south-western France.

== See also ==
- Communes of the Lot-et-Garonne department
