= Saint-Jean-de-Thurac =

- Commune
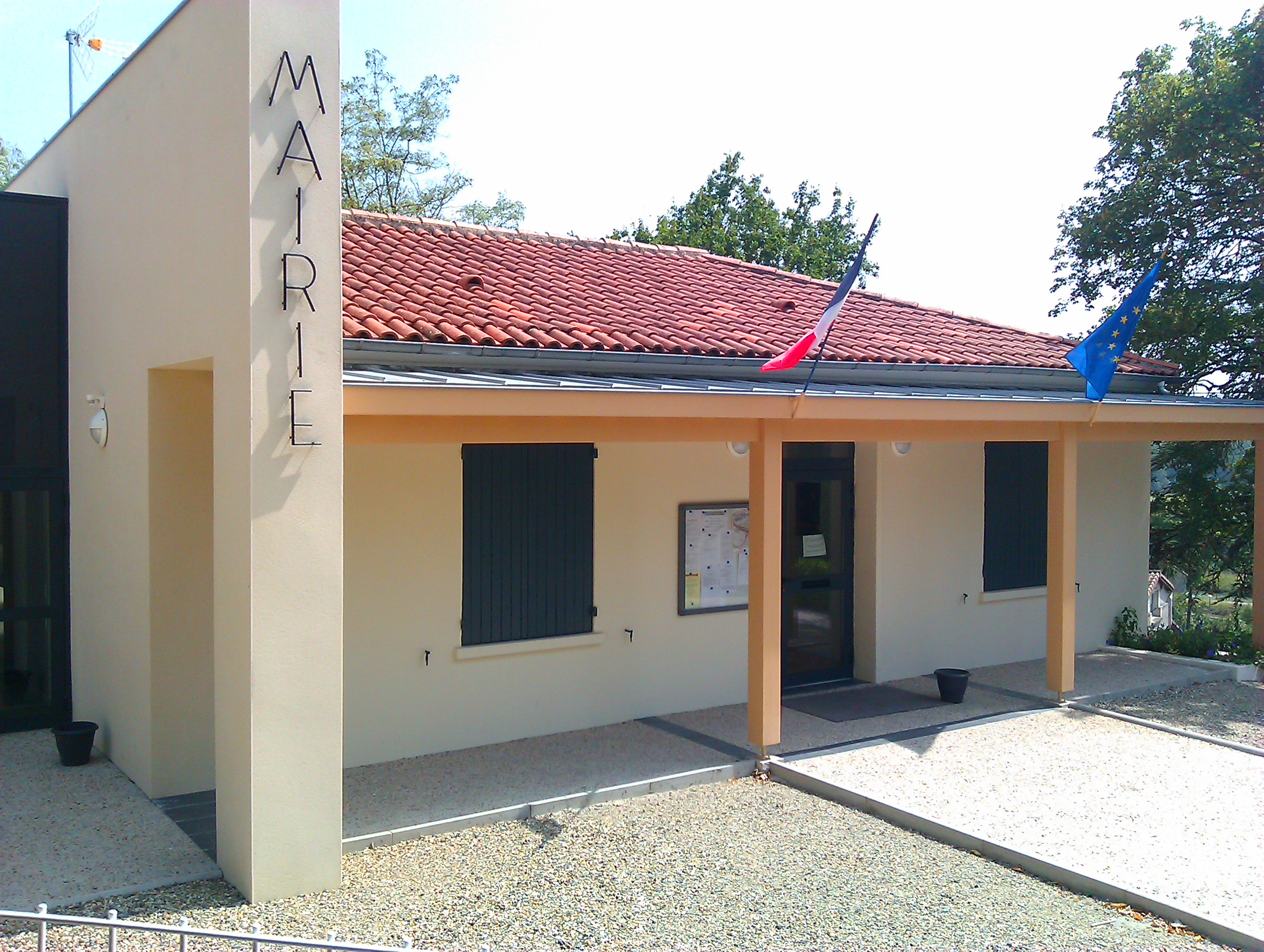
- The town hall in Saint-Jean-de-Thurac
- Location of Saint-Jean-de-Thurac
- Location within France Location within Nouvelle-Aquitaine
- Coordinates: 44°09′18″N 0°44′38″E
- Country: France
- Region: Nouvelle-Aquitaine
- Department: Lot-et-Garonne
- Arrondissement: Agen
- Canton: Le Sud-Est agenais
- Intercommunality: Agglomération d'Agen

Government
  - Mayor (2020–2026): Jean Prouzet
- Area^{1}: 5.12 km^{2} (1.98 sq mi)
- Elevation: 91 m (299 ft)
- Highest elevation: 186 m (610 ft)
- Lowest elevation: 45 m (148 ft)
- Population (2023): 563
  - Density: 110/km^{2} (285/sq mi)
- Time zone: UTC+01:00 (CET)
  - Summer (DST): UTC+02:00 (CEST)
- INSEE/Postal code: 47248 /47270
- ^{1} French Land Register data, which excludes lakes, ponds, glaciers > 1 km^{2} (0.386 sq mi or 247 acres) and river estuaries.

Saint-Jean-de-Thurac (French pronunciation: [sɛ̃ ʒɑ̃ də tyʁak]; Languedocien: Sent Joan de Turac) is a commune in the Lot-et-Garonne department in south-western France. It lies to the east of the town of Agen. The departmental road D813 which leads eastward from Agen to Toulouse passes through the commune. There are no commercial premises in this commune and the district derives its name from a thirteenth-century Catholic church which lies just off the D813. Beside the church is an elementary school and the Mairie, or town hall, building.

== Demography ==
Historical population
Year	Pop.	±% p.a.
1968	281	—
1975	325	+2.10%
1982	344	+0.81%
1990	381	+1.29%
1999	408	+0.76%
2007	492	+2.37%
2012	505	+0.52%
2017	560	+2.09%
2023	563	+0.09%
Source: INSEE

== See also ==
- Communes of the Lot-et-Garonne department
