= Beauville, Lot-et-Garonne =

Beauville
- Commune
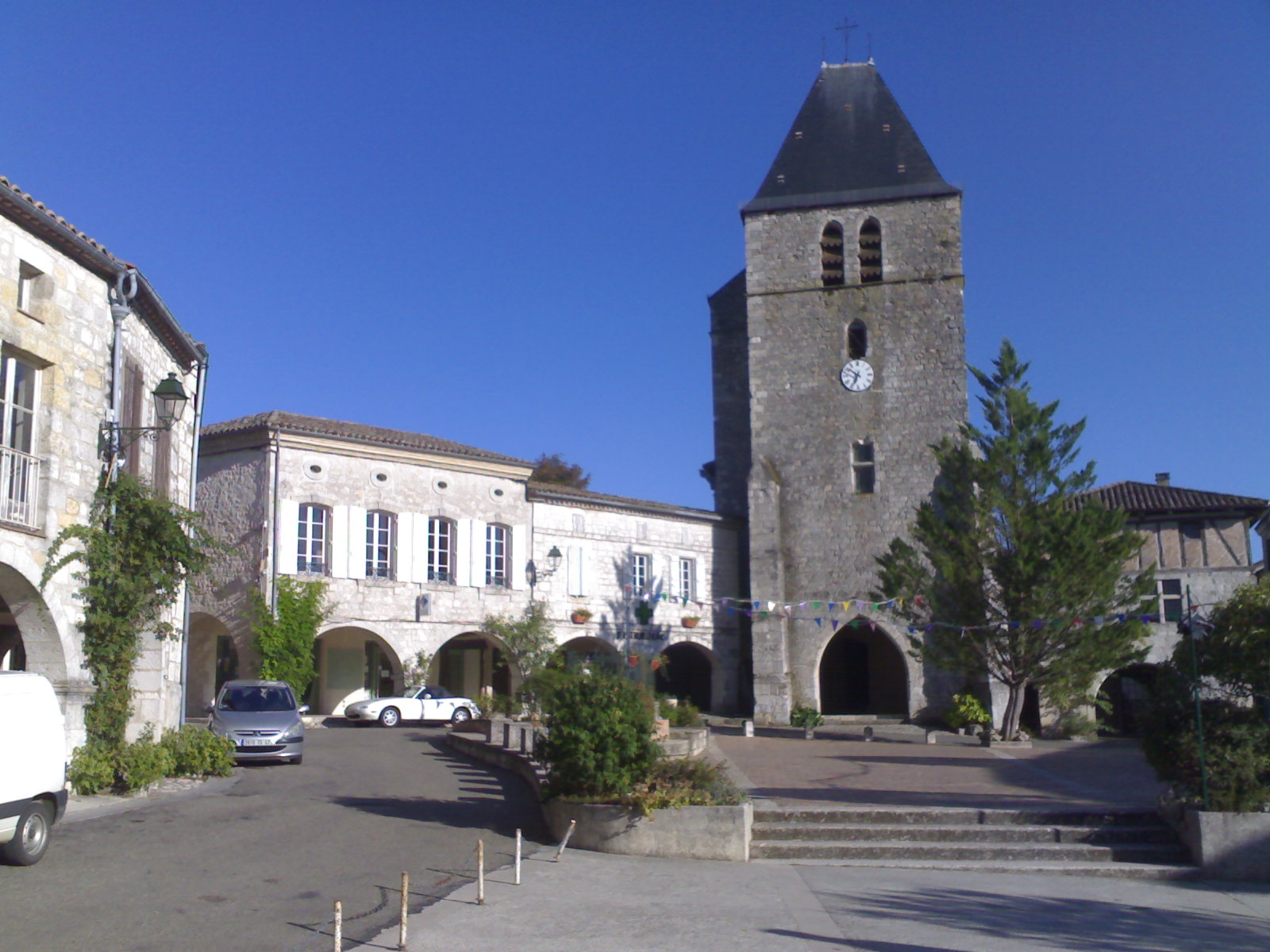
- Place Archambault De Vençay

- Coat of arms
- Location of Beauville
- Location within France Location within Nouvelle-Aquitaine
- Coordinates: 44°16′39″N 0°52′59″E
- Country: France
- Region: Nouvelle-Aquitaine
- Department: Lot-et-Garonne
- Arrondissement: Agen
- Canton: Le Pays de Serres
- Intercommunality: Agglomération d'Agen

Government
  - Mayor (2021–2026): Patrick Roux
- Area^{1}: 23.17 km^{2} (8.95 sq mi)
- Elevation: 240 m (790 ft)
- Highest elevation: 231 m (758 ft)
- Lowest elevation: 84 m (276 ft)
- Population (2023): 551
  - Density: 23.8/km^{2} (61.6/sq mi)
- Time zone: UTC+01:00 (CET)
  - Summer (DST): UTC+02:00 (CEST)
- INSEE/Postal code: 47025 /47470
- ^{1} French Land Register data, which excludes lakes, ponds, glaciers > 1 km^{2} (0.386 sq mi or 247 acres) and river estuaries.

Beauville (French pronunciation: [bovil]; Occitan: Bauvila) is a commune in the Lot-et-Garonne department in southwestern France.

== Population ==
Historical population
Year	Pop.	±% p.a.
1968	579	—
1975	462	−3.17%
1982	545	+2.39%
1990	548	+0.07%
1999	553	+0.10%
2007	582	+0.64%
2012	567	−0.52%
2017	566	−0.04%
2023	551	−0.45%
Source: INSEE

== See also ==
- Communes of the Lot-et-Garonne department
