= Saint-Pierre-de-Clairac =

- Commune
- Location of Saint-Pierre-de-Clairac
- Location within France Location within Nouvelle-Aquitaine
- Coordinates: 44°10′49″N 0°45′42″E
- Country: France
- Region: Nouvelle-Aquitaine
- Department: Lot-et-Garonne
- Arrondissement: Agen
- Canton: Le Sud-Est agenais
- Intercommunality: Agglomération d'Agen

Government
  - Mayor (2020–2026): Philippe Sofys
- Area^{1}: 13.15 km^{2} (5.08 sq mi)
- Elevation: 100 m (330 ft)
- Highest elevation: 177 m (581 ft)
- Lowest elevation: 52 m (171 ft)
- Population (2023): 899
  - Density: 68.4/km^{2} (177/sq mi)
- Time zone: UTC+01:00 (CET)
  - Summer (DST): UTC+02:00 (CEST)
- INSEE/Postal code: 47269 /47270
- ^{1} French Land Register data, which excludes lakes, ponds, glaciers > 1 km^{2} (0.386 sq mi or 247 acres) and river estuaries.

Saint-Pierre-de-Clairac (French pronunciation: [sɛ̃ pjɛʁ də klɛʁak]; Languedocien: Sent Pèir de Clairac) is a commune in the Lot-et-Garonne department in south-western France.

== Geography ==
The Séoune forms part of the commune's eastern border, flows westward through the middle of the commune, then forms part of its western border.

== See also ==
- Communes of the Lot-et-Garonne department
