= Saint-Romain-le-Noble =

- Commune
- Location of Saint-Romain-le-Noble
- Location within France Location within Nouvelle-Aquitaine
- Coordinates: 44°09′47″N 0°47′10″E
- Country: France
- Region: Nouvelle-Aquitaine
- Department: Lot-et-Garonne
- Arrondissement: Agen
- Canton: Le Sud-Est agenais
- Intercommunality: Agglomération d'Agen

Government
  - Mayor (2020–2026): Mathieu Tovo
- Area^{1}: 8.5 km^{2} (3.3 sq mi)
- Highest elevation: 181 m (594 ft)
- Lowest elevation: 45 m (148 ft)
- Population (2023): 412
  - Density: 48/km^{2} (130/sq mi)
- Time zone: UTC+01:00 (CET)
  - Summer (DST): UTC+02:00 (CEST)
- INSEE/Postal code: 47274 /47270
- ^{1} French Land Register data, which excludes lakes, ponds, glaciers > 1 km^{2} (0.386 sq mi or 247 acres) and river estuaries.

Saint-Romain-le-Noble (French pronunciation: [sɛ̃ ʁɔmɛ̃ lə nɔbl]; Occitan: Sant Roman lo Nòble) is a commune in the Lot-et-Garonne department in south-western France.

== See also ==
- Communes of the Lot-et-Garonne department
