= List of windmills in Lot-et-Garonne =

A list of windmills in Lot-et-Garonne, France.

Location	Name of mill	Type	Built	Notes	Photograph
Beaugas	Moulin de la Vierge; Les Trois Moulins	Moulin Tour	1752	Moulins-a-Vent (in French)	
Beaupuy	Moulin de Beaupuy; Moulin d'Auber	Moulin Tour			
Beauville	Moulin de Malherbe	Moulin Tour		Moulins-a-Vent (in French)	
Beyssac	Moulin du Télégraphe				
Blaymont	Moulin de Zette				
Bon-Encontre	Moulin de Poivre				
Brugnac	Moulin de Rocquecor	Moulin Tour		Moulins-a-Vent (in French)	
Castelculier	Moulin de Laclotte	Moulin Tour			
Castelnaud-de-Gratecambe	Moulin de Rouzé				
Cauzac	Moulin du Conté	Moulin Tour			
Coulx	Moulin de Burlat	Moulin Tour			
Coulx	Moulin de Coulx	Moulin Tour	1799	Moulins-a-Vent (in French)	
Cuq	Moulin de Cuq	Moulin Tour		Moulins-a-Vent (in French)	
Dolmayrac	Moulin de l'Amaurelle	Moulin Tour		Moulins-a-Vent (in French)	
Duras	Moulin de la Perroterie				
Engayrac	Moulin de Campagnac				
Foulayronnes	Moulin de la Tuque	Moulin Tour	1735	Moulins-a-Vent (in French)	
Foulayronnes	Moulin de Talives	Moulin Tour	Early 18th century	Moulins-a-Vent (in French)	
Francescas	Moulin de Francescas	Moulin Tour	Late 16th or early 17th century	Moulins-a-Vent (in French)	
Galapian	Moulin de Paillères				
Gontaud-de-Nogaret	Moulin de Gibra	Moulin Tour	Late 18th or early 19th century	Moulins-a-Vent (in French)	
Grateloup	Moulin de Roujol	Moulin Tour	1808	Moulins-a-Vent (in French)	
Grateloup	Moulin de Gory	Moulin Tour	1800	Moulins-a-Vent (in French)	
La Croix-Blanche	Moulin de Pech de Fargues				
La Sauvetat-du-Dropt	Moulin de Bellonne				
Lamontjoie	Moulin de Daubèze				
Laplume	Moulin de Muguette				
Laplume	Moulin d'Escuran				
Le Saumont	Moulin de Conlagué				
Loubéjac	Moulin de Loubéjac				
Loubès-Bernac	Moulin Guerrier Haut				
Loubès-Bernac	Le Moulin de Brisseaux	Moulin Tour		Visit France	
Lusignan-Petit	Moulin de Sabrecul	Moulin Tour		Moulins-a-Vent (in French)	
Madaillan	Moulin de Baret				
Beyssac-Marmande	Moulin de Télégraph	Moulin Tour	1770	Moulins-a-Vent (in French)	
Moirax	Moulin de Moirax				
Monbahus	Moulin de la Vierge				
Montagnac-sur-Auvignon	Moulin de Belloc	Moulin Tour	1871	Moulins-a-Vent (in French)	
Montastruc	Moulin de Tandou				
Montauriol	Moulin de Lartigue				
Montesquieu	Moulin de Cantecoucut	Moulin Tour		Moulins-a-Vent (in French)	
Montpezat	Moulin de Montpezat	Moulin Tour		Moulins-a-Vent (in French)	
Pardaillan	Moulin de Bigayre				
Pardaillan	Moulin de Fourquet				
Prayssas	Moulin de Manoir				
Prayssas	Moulin de Bel Air				
Puyrimol	Moulin de Puyrimol				
Sérignac-sur-Garonne	Moulin de Tavalo	Moulin Tour		Moulins-a-Vent (in French)	
Saint-Aubin	Moulin de Thomas				
Saint-Caprais-de-Lerm	Moulin de Puscla				
Saint-Eutrope-de-Born	Moulin de Scandaillac				
Saint-Léger	Moulin de la Motte				
Saint-Sernin-de-Duras	Moulin de la Bique				
Tourtrès	Moulin de Tourtrès	Moulin Tour	1895	Moulins-a-Vent (in French)	
Villeneuve-de-Duras	Moulin de Cante Ruch; Moulin Marquet	Moulin Tour		Moulins-a-Vent (in French)	
Villeneuve-de-Duras	Moulin de Villeneuve-de-Duras				
Xaintrailles	Moulin de Xaintrailles				
