= War of Saint-Sardos =

1324 armed conflict between England and France

Date	1 July – 22 September 1324
Location	Duchy of Aquitaine
Result	French victory

Belligerents
England	France

Commanders and leaders
Edward II of England; Edmund of Woodstock, 1st Earl of Kent; Hugh le Despenser, 1st Earl of Winchester	Charles IV of France; Charles of Valois; Gaston II of Foix-Béarn

Strength
25,000	7,000

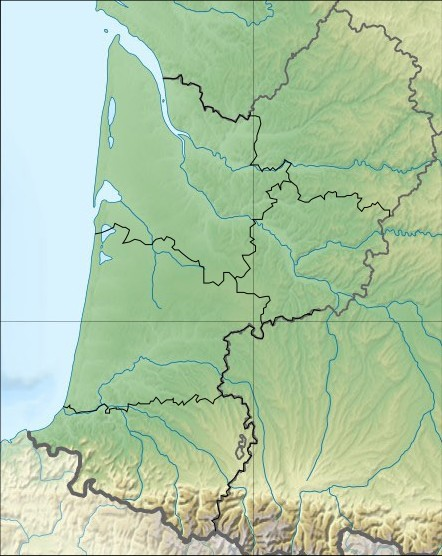
Location of places named in the text

The War of Saint-Sardos was a short war fought between the Kingdom of England and the Kingdom of France in 1324 during which the French invaded the English Duchy of Aquitaine. The war was a clear defeat for the English and led indirectly to the overthrow of Edward II of England. It can also be seen as one of the precursors to the Hundred Years' War.

== Background ==
During the reign of King Philip IV of France and his sons, France's monarchy gradually expanded its authority, as the power of the king grew at the expense of the nobles. One of the chief tools in this process was the Parlement of Paris, which allowed people to appeal the decisions of lower courts. During these appeals their possessions were under the direct protection of the Crown, weakening one of the most important privileges of the nobility: that of jurisdiction over their own lands.

One of those who felt this encroachment the most was Edward II, King of England and Duke of Aquitaine. As Duke of Aquitaine, he ruled Gascony as a French vassal, the last continental remnant of the Angevin Empire. The French kings wanted this last English foothold gone too, and were very eager to settle disputes between the Duke and his subjects. Thus, unless he wanted a direct confrontation, Edward II could do little but watch the duchy dwindle away as numerous small cases were decided against him.

== Litigations and negotiations ==
One of these was the small village of Saint-Sardos. The village was within the jurisdiction of the Duke of Aquitaine, but it also contained a Benedictine priory and the priory's motherhouse, the Abbey of Sarlat, lay outside. In 1318, the abbot petitioned Parlement to declare Saint-Sardos exempt from the King-Duke's jurisdiction. He also offered to build a bastide there. The case proceeded slowly, but in December 1322, the Parlement ruled in the abbot's favour. On 15 October 1323, a royal sergeant arrived at Saint-Sardos and erected a stake bearing the arms of the King of France.

Local landowners were not too pleased. They feared that the new bastide would attract settlers from their own estates and thus diminish their own incomes. The night after the sergeant's arrival, Raymond-Bernard, the lord of Montpezat, raided Saint-Sardos. He burned the village to the ground and hanged the sergeant at his own stake. Ralph Basset, the Seneschal of Gascony and highest English official in France, had met with Raymond-Bernard only two days before the raid. The French government accused him of authorising the crime.

Edward II had more than enough problems at home and did not need a diplomatic crisis with France. The news took more than five weeks to reach Edward II, and as soon as the news reached him, he sent a letter offering his apologies, proclaiming his innocence and promising to find and punish the culprit. Meanwhile, in Paris, a commission was appointed to investigate the facts, and Ralph Basset had been summoned to appear before it. He declined to attend and sent some unconvincing excuses. On 21 December 1323, Edward II's chief advocate in the Parlement, Pons Tournemire, his proctor in the assembly, was seized and imprisoned in the Châtelet.

The English ambassadors met with King Charles IV of France at Limoges, where he had spent Christmas. The King accepted Edward II's personal excuses but not those of Basset and Montpezat. He ordered those two and several other Gascon officials to appear before him on 23 January 1324, but none of them appeared. In February they were outlawed and their property declared forfeited to the Crown. The French seneschals of Toulouse and Périgueux were ordered to enter the Duchy and take possession of the castle of Montpezat by force, but the order proved to be impossible to carry out, as Edward II ordered Raymond-Bernard to defend the castle in his name.

The English used what means they could to prolong the proceedings without making any great concessions. Basset was recalled in March 1324 and in April, an embassy was sent to France with instructions to negotiate a peaceful settlement, if possible. The embassy was led by Edmund of Woodstock, Earl of Kent and the Archbishop of Dublin Alexander de Bicknor. However, time was quickly running out. Charles IV had ordered his army to muster on the borders of Aquitaine at Moissac on 10 June.

The ambassadors received a chilly welcome when they arrived at Paris and first promised that Montpezat would be surrendered and that Edward II would come to Amiens on 1 July to do homage. They then travelled to Bordeaux to see to the fulfillment of the agreement. There, they learned that Charles IV's conduct of the affair had caused much indignation among the local nobility. The Earl of Kent, therefore, changed his mind and decided to resist. The French officials were forced to return empty-handed. New ambassadors were sent, led by the Earl of Pembroke, whose instructions were to persuade Charles IV to put off the homage and to promise to surrender Montpezat until homage had been duly performed. However, while they were on their way to Amiens, the Earl of Pembroke died of a sudden heart attack. When they finally arrived, it was too late since Charles IV had already declared the duchy forfeit.

== War ==
In August 1324, Charles of Valois, the king's uncle, invaded Aquitaine. The English were poorly prepared, many garrisons were little more than skeleton forces and some locations had no troops at all. Aided by local nobles, such as the Count of Foix and the Lord of Albret, and approximately 7,000 troops, Charles of Valois swept through the region and ended the war less than six weeks after it had begun. Most towns surrendered immediately. Montpezat was captured in the first few days and razed to the ground. The stiffest resistance came from the Earl of Kent at La Réole, who managed to hold out for a few weeks before he surrendered on 22 September. A truce was worked out in which each party was to hold its present positions in the duchy for six months. As it turned out, that would be the permanent end to the short conflict.

The French were prepared for the truce to expire, and in December, the French army was ordered to assemble at Bergerac on 1 May 1325. It planned a two-prong attack, with one force invading Saintonge and capturing Saintes, and the other Bordeaux. However, Charles IV made it known that he would not insist upon enforcing the total forfeiture if Edward II ceded the Agenais to him and did homage for the rest of the duchy.

== Aftermath ==
The war reverberated loudly in English politics. Hugh le Despenser, the Elder, whose military ineptitude and failure to relieve La Réole had led to the quick collapse of English resistance, was forced to send Queen Isabella to France to negotiate terms. She took her son Edward of Windsor, to whom Edward II had resigned Aquitaine and Ponthieu, that he might do homage for them. A new truce was agreed on 31 March 1325. According to it, Charles IV was to be allowed to go into nominal occupation of what was left of the Duchy of Aquitaine, with French officials installed in the coastal towns of Aquitaine, and real control would remain with Edward II's garrisons. The parts that the French had conquered in the previous year would be restored only as reparation for a war, which the French government had found more costly than it had expected. The truce involved the tacit recognition of the loss of most of the duchy, and Edward II reluctantly ratified it. The humiliating ending of the war and what followed Isabella's embassy would lead to Edward II's overthrow in England.
