= Henri Heurtebise =

French poet and editor (1936–2023)

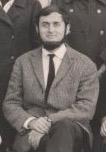
- Heurtebise in 1967
- Born: 14 February 1936; Bazens, France
- Died: 7 January 2023 (aged 86); Damazan, France
- Occupations: Poet; Editor

Henri Heurtebise (14 February 1936 – 7 January 2023) was a French poet and editor. He was the founder of Éditions Multiples.

== Biography ==
Heurtebise was born on 14 February 1936 in Bazens. He wrote his first poem in 1955 at the age of 19. He was a professor of classical literature at the Lycée de Muret from 1960 to 1996. He founded Éditions Multiples in 1970 alongside René Cazajous. In 1993, he created the "Fondamente" collection.

In 1980, Heurtebise moved to Longages and he founded the festival Ombres Blanches in Toulouse seven years later. The festival has since been celebrated at Toulouse's Cave Poésie bookstore.

Henri Heurtebise died in Damazan on 7 January 2023, at the age of 86.

== Publications ==
- Chantecri (1970)
- Bref (1976)
- Aires de parlerie (1980)
- Le Menu Temps (1985)
- D'automnes (1990)
- L'Inépuisable Fini (1991)
- Le Chevet (1994)
- D'imaginie (1996)
- Adam et Ève (1997)
- Humaine humain (2000)
- Monsieur de Non Juan (2000)
- Filigranes (2004)
- Chant profond (2005)
