= Saint-Vincent-de-Lamontjoie =

- Commune
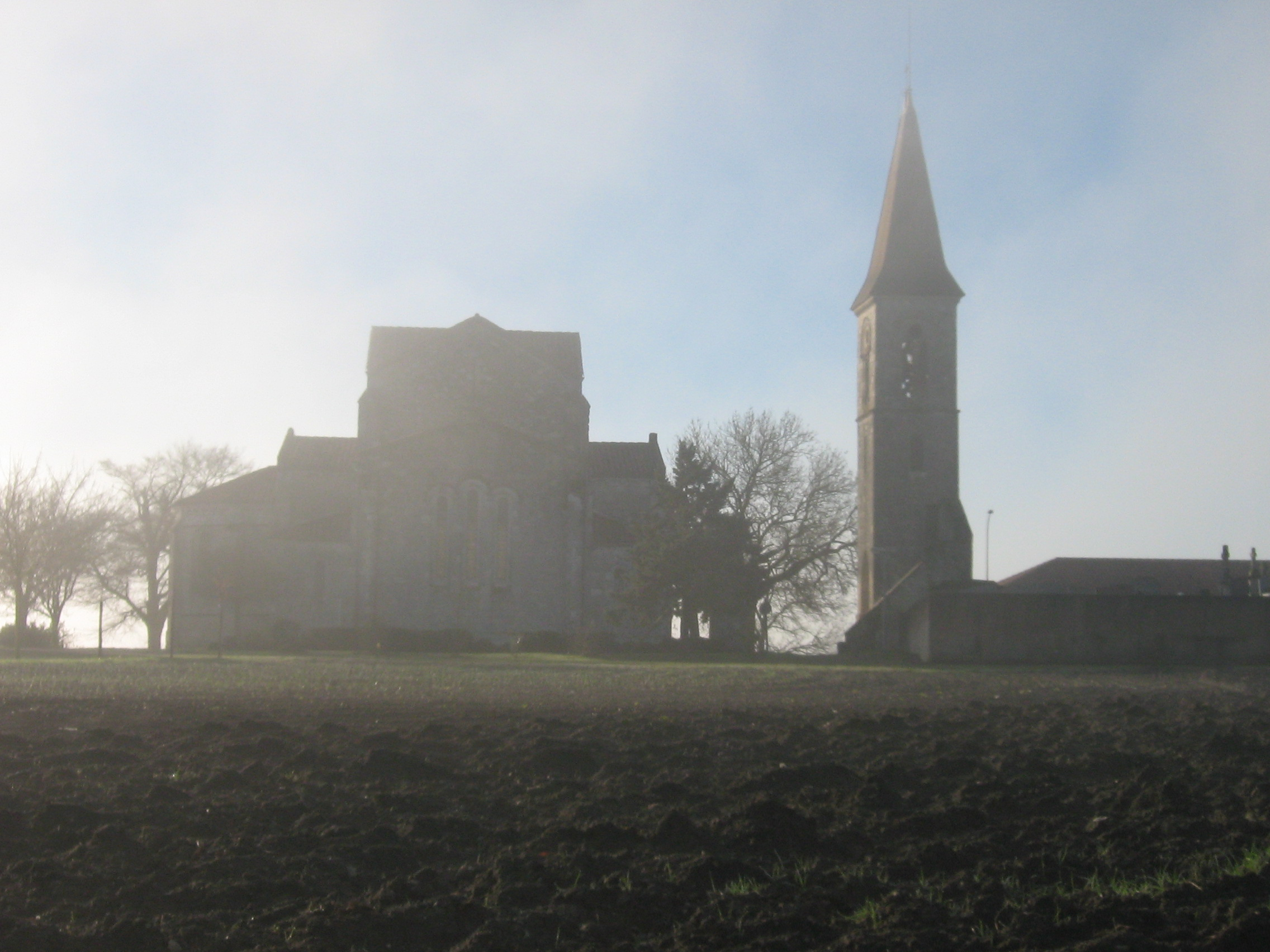
- The church in Saint-Vincent-de-Lamontjoie
- Location of Saint-Vincent-de-Lamontjoie
- Location within France Location within Nouvelle-Aquitaine
- Coordinates: 44°05′09″N 0°30′47″E
- Country: France
- Region: Nouvelle-Aquitaine
- Department: Lot-et-Garonne
- Arrondissement: Nérac
- Canton: L'Albret

Government
  - Mayor (2020–2026): Daniel Airodo
- Area^{1}: 15.29 km^{2} (5.90 sq mi)
- Elevation: 195 m (640 ft)
- Highest elevation: 195 m (640 ft)
- Lowest elevation: 69 m (226 ft)
- Population (2023): 223
  - Density: 14.6/km^{2} (37.8/sq mi)
- Time zone: UTC+01:00 (CET)
  - Summer (DST): UTC+02:00 (CEST)
- INSEE/Postal code: 47282 /47310
- ^{1} French Land Register data, which excludes lakes, ponds, glaciers > 1 km^{2} (0.386 sq mi or 247 acres) and river estuaries.

Saint-Vincent-de-Lamontjoie (French pronunciation: [sɛ̃ vɛ̃sɑ̃ də lamɔ̃ʒwa], literally Saint-Vincent of Lamontjoie; Gascon: Sent Vincenç de la Montjòia) is a commune in the Lot-et-Garonne department in south-western France.

== See also ==
- Communes of the Lot-et-Garonne department
