= Lagarrigue =

Lagarrigue may refer to the following places in France:

- Lagarrigue, Lot-et-Garonne, a commune in the Lot-et-Garonne department
- Lagarrigue, Tarn, a commune in the Tarn department
