= Tour de l'Honneur =

Coordinates: 45°18′26″N 0°56′36″W

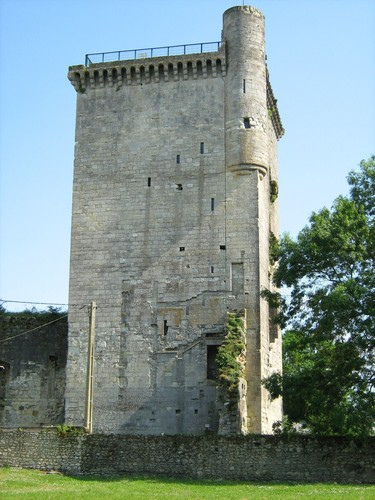
Tour de l'Honneur de Lesparre, last remaining portion of de Lesparre castle

The tour de l'Honneur is a tower and the only remain of the château de Lesparre. Located in Lesparre-Médoc, in the Gironde department and Nouvelle-Aquitaine region of France, it is listed as a monument historique since September 10, 1913.

The tower was the main part of a four towers defensive structure, built in the 14th century. A castle previously occupied the site, referred in 12th century documents as « castello quid dicitur Sparra ». Because of Eleanor of Aquitaine marriage with Henri Plantagenêt, the castle became part of England for almost three centuries, until 1453.

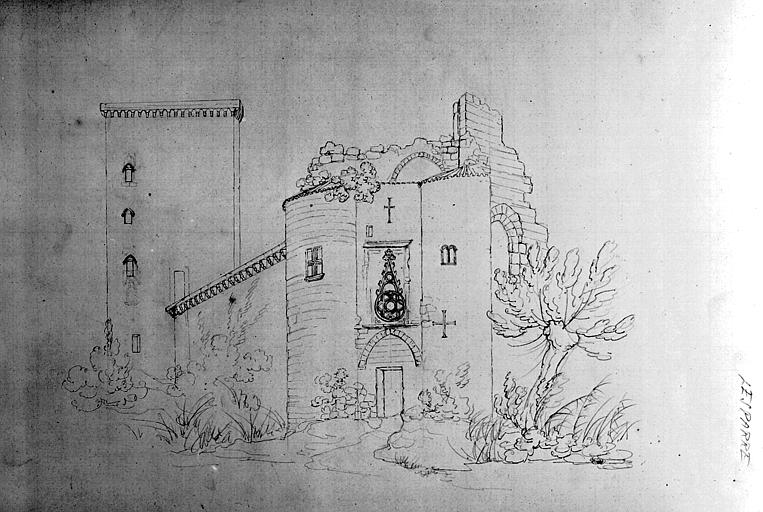
The Lesparre Castle in the 14th century.

During middle age, the Lesparre controlled a large part of the Médoc. The castle was visited by famous Occitan speakers, such as the troubadours Aimeric de Belenoi and Pey de Corbian. The castle later belonged to the Madaillan family, the Albret family, the Foix family, the Clèves family, the Matignon family, the Épernon family and the Gramont family, before being sold as a national property during the French Revolution and was almost completely dismantled soon after.

The alternative name of the castle was « Château de l'honneur de Lesparre », so the only tower remaining today has been named « Tour de l'honneur ». Almost thirty metres high it has five storeys: a ground floor decorated with intersecting ribs and four arched rooms. The platform at the summit still has a Machicolation and a corner tower with a corbel arch.

Today, the tower is a museum dedicated to local history, craft and Médoc traditions.
