= Jean-Louis Tolot =

France international rugby union player

Jean-Louis Tolot (born Montagnac-sur-Auvignon, 13 June 1957) is a former French rugby union player. He played as a prop.

He played all his career for SU Agen, from 1975/76 to 1992/93. He won the Top 14 in 1981/83. He was runners-up for three occasions, in 1983/85, 1985/86 and 1989/90. He won the Challenge Yves du Manoir in 1991/92.

He had only one cap for France, when he was called for the 1987 Rugby World Cup, playing in the 70–12 win over Zimbabwe, at Auckland, at 2 June 1987.
