= Lacépède, Lot-et-Garonne =

Lacépède
- Commune
- Coat of arms
- Location of Lacépède
- Location within France Location within Nouvelle-Aquitaine
- Coordinates: 44°19′21″N 0°27′46″E
- Country: France
- Region: Nouvelle-Aquitaine
- Department: Lot-et-Garonne
- Arrondissement: Agen
- Canton: Le Confluent
- Intercommunality: Confluent et Coteaux de Prayssas

Government
  - Mayor (2020–2026): Sophie Cassagne
- Area^{1}: 11.33 km^{2} (4.37 sq mi)
- Elevation: 172 m (564 ft)
- Highest elevation: 207 m (679 ft)
- Lowest elevation: 53 m (174 ft)
- Population (2023): 320
  - Density: 28/km^{2} (73/sq mi)
- Time zone: UTC+01:00 (CET)
  - Summer (DST): UTC+02:00 (CEST)
- INSEE/Postal code: 47125 /47360
- ^{1} French Land Register data, which excludes lakes, ponds, glaciers > 1 km^{2} (0.386 sq mi or 247 acres) and river estuaries.

Lacépède (French pronunciation: [lasepɛd]; Occitan: La Cepeda) is a commune in the Lot-et-Garonne department in south-western France.

== See also ==
- Communes of the Lot-et-Garonne department
