= Clermont-Dessous =

- Commune
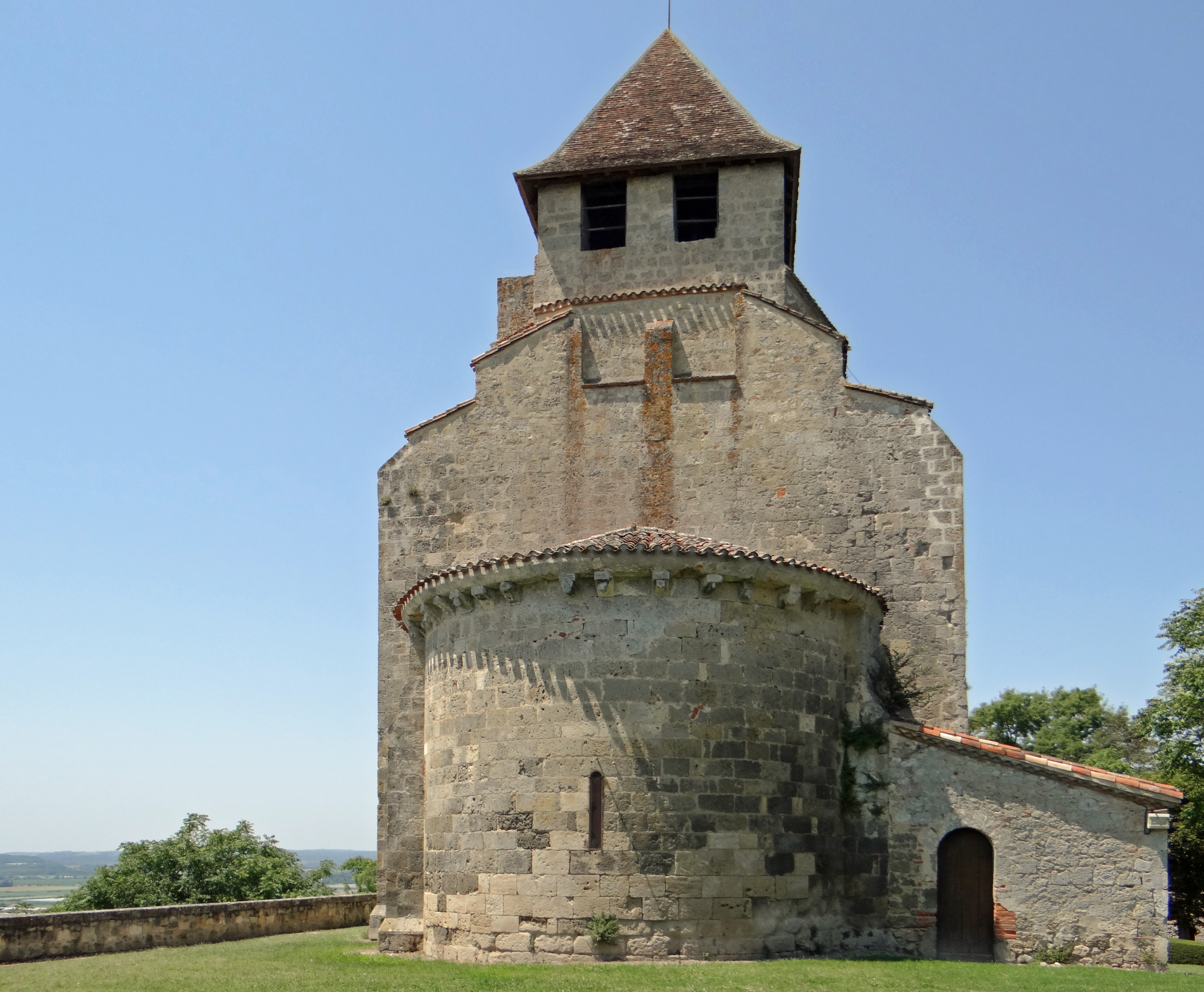
- The church in Clermont-Dessous

- Coat of arms
- Location of Clermont-Dessous
- Location within France Location within Nouvelle-Aquitaine
- Coordinates: 44°14′22″N 0°26′47″E
- Country: France
- Region: Nouvelle-Aquitaine
- Department: Lot-et-Garonne
- Arrondissement: Agen
- Canton: Le Confluent
- Intercommunality: Confluent et Coteaux de Prayssas

Government
  - Mayor (2020–2026): Jean-Pierre Causero
- Area^{1}: 15.08 km^{2} (5.82 sq mi)
- Elevation: 135 m (443 ft)
- Highest elevation: 190 m (620 ft)
- Lowest elevation: 30 m (98 ft)
- Population (2023): 798
  - Density: 52.9/km^{2} (137/sq mi)
- Time zone: UTC+01:00 (CET)
  - Summer (DST): UTC+02:00 (CEST)
- INSEE/Postal code: 47066 /47130
- ^{1} French Land Register data, which excludes lakes, ponds, glaciers > 1 km^{2} (0.386 sq mi or 247 acres) and river estuaries.

Clermont-Dessous (Occitan: Clarmont-Sota) is a commune in the Lot-et-Garonne department in south-western France.

== History ==
Clermont-Dessous was once a stronghold in Agenais to which the village of Fortic was later attached. The place was besieged in vain in 1221 by Amaury de Monfort, and was taken by routiers in 1457.

In the middle years of the nineteenth century, fairs were held on 7 March, 19 October and 13 December.

== Administration ==
List of mayors since 1793:

- 1793–1794
  - Joseph Vidouze
- 1795–1796
  - Guillaume Jullia
- 1796–1797
  - Joseph Vidouze
- 1798–1799
  - Antoine Sibault
- 1799–1801
  - Arnaud Riviere
- 1801–1838
  - Antoine Lasserre
- 1838–1860
  - Léon de Sevin
- 1860–1864
  - Vincent Dumas
- 1864–1870
  - Charles Lasserre
- 1870–1871
  - Pierre Delbos
- 1871–1876
  - Pierre-Célestin Ache
- 1876–1881
  - Pierre Delbos
- 1881–1888
  - Joseph Delbos
- 1888–1925
  - Jean Camboue
- 1925–1944
  - Paul Maurice
- 1944–1949
  - Ernest Jaffre
- 1949–1983
  - Roger Jaffre
- 1983–2019
  - Jean Malbec

The town hall is located at Fourtic, a village crossed by the road from Bordeaux to Toulouse.

== See also ==
- Communes of the Lot-et-Garonne department

== Sources ==
- Girault de Saint-Fargeau, Eusèbe (1844). Dictionnaire géographique, historique, administratif et industriel de toutes les communes de France [Geographic, historical, administrative and industrial dictionary of all the communes of France] (in French). Vol. I. Paris: Firmin Didot.
