= Nomdieu =

- Commune
- Coat of arms
- Location of Nomdieu
- Location within France Location within Nouvelle-Aquitaine
- Coordinates: 44°05′44″N 0°28′33″E
- Country: France
- Region: Nouvelle-Aquitaine
- Department: Lot-et-Garonne
- Arrondissement: Nérac
- Canton: L'Albret

Government
  - Mayor (2020–2026): Jean-Pierre Lussagnet
- Area^{1}: 12.59 km^{2} (4.86 sq mi)
- Elevation: 80 m (260 ft)
- Highest elevation: 142 m (466 ft)
- Lowest elevation: 64 m (210 ft)
- Population (2023): 256
  - Density: 20.3/km^{2} (52.7/sq mi)
- Time zone: UTC+01:00 (CET)
  - Summer (DST): UTC+02:00 (CEST)
- INSEE/Postal code: 47197 /47600
- ^{1} French Land Register data, which excludes lakes, ponds, glaciers > 1 km^{2} (0.386 sq mi or 247 acres) and river estuaries.

Nomdieu (French pronunciation: [nɔ̃djø]; Occitan: Lo Nom Diu) is a commune in the Lot-et-Garonne department in south-western France.

== See also ==
- Communes of the Lot-et-Garonne department
