= Nicole, Lot-et-Garonne =

Nicole
- Commune
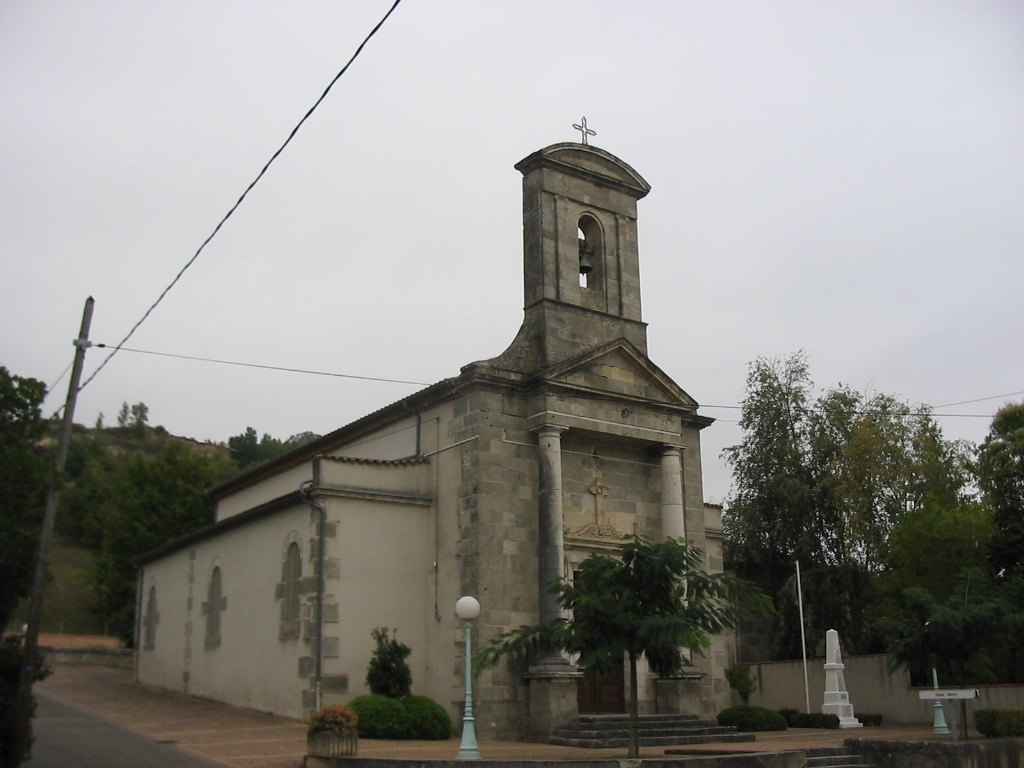
- The church in Nicole

- Coat of arms
- Location of Nicole
- Location within France Location within Nouvelle-Aquitaine
- Coordinates: 44°19′32″N 0°20′13″E
- Country: France
- Region: Nouvelle-Aquitaine
- Department: Lot-et-Garonne
- Arrondissement: Agen
- Canton: Le Confluent
- Intercommunality: Confluent et Coteaux de Prayssas

Government
  - Mayor (2020–2026): François Collado
- Area^{1}: 4.78 km^{2} (1.85 sq mi)
- Elevation: 34 m (112 ft)
- Highest elevation: 163 m (535 ft)
- Lowest elevation: 22 m (72 ft)
- Population (2023): 237
  - Density: 49.6/km^{2} (128/sq mi)
- Time zone: UTC+01:00 (CET)
  - Summer (DST): UTC+02:00 (CEST)
- INSEE/Postal code: 47196 /47190
- ^{1} French Land Register data, which excludes lakes, ponds, glaciers > 1 km^{2} (0.386 sq mi or 247 acres) and river estuaries.

Nicole (French pronunciation: [nikɔl]; Occitan: Nicòla) is a commune in the Lot-et-Garonne department in south-western France.

== See also ==
- Communes of the Lot-et-Garonne department
