= Réaup-Lisse =

- Commune
- Location of Réaup-Lisse
- Location within France Location within Nouvelle-Aquitaine
- Coordinates: 44°05′29″N 0°11′16″E
- Country: France
- Region: Nouvelle-Aquitaine
- Department: Lot-et-Garonne
- Arrondissement: Nérac
- Canton: L'Albret
- Intercommunality: Albret Communauté

Government
  - Mayor (2020–2026): Pascal Legendre
- Area^{1}: 70.89 km^{2} (27.37 sq mi)
- Elevation: 172 m (564 ft)
- Highest elevation: 174 m (571 ft)
- Lowest elevation: 43 m (141 ft)
- Population (2023): 591
  - Density: 8.34/km^{2} (21.6/sq mi)
- Time zone: UTC+01:00 (CET)
  - Summer (DST): UTC+02:00 (CEST)
- INSEE/Postal code: 47221 /47170
- ^{1} French Land Register data, which excludes lakes, ponds, glaciers > 1 km^{2} (0.386 sq mi or 247 acres) and river estuaries.

Réaup-Lisse (Occitan: Lis) is a commune in the Lot-et-Garonne department in south-western France.

== See also ==
- Communes of the Lot-et-Garonne department
