= Sembas =

- Commune
- Location of Sembas
- Location within France Location within Nouvelle-Aquitaine
- Coordinates: 44°19′08″N 0°38′56″E
- Country: France
- Region: Nouvelle-Aquitaine
- Department: Lot-et-Garonne
- Arrondissement: Villeneuve-sur-Lot
- Canton: Le Confluent
- Intercommunality: Confluent et Coteaux de Prayssas

Government
  - Mayor (2020–2026): Aurore Lascombes
- Area^{1}: 12.51 km^{2} (4.83 sq mi)
- Elevation: 215 m (705 ft)
- Highest elevation: 224 m (735 ft)
- Lowest elevation: 124 m (407 ft)
- Population (2023): 142
  - Density: 11.4/km^{2} (29.4/sq mi)
- Time zone: UTC+01:00 (CET)
  - Summer (DST): UTC+02:00 (CEST)
- INSEE/Postal code: 47297 /47360
- ^{1} French Land Register data, which excludes lakes, ponds, glaciers > 1 km^{2} (0.386 sq mi or 247 acres) and river estuaries.

Sembas is a commune in the Lot-et-Garonne department in south-western France.

== See also ==
- Communes of the Lot-et-Garonne department
