= Calignac =

- Commune
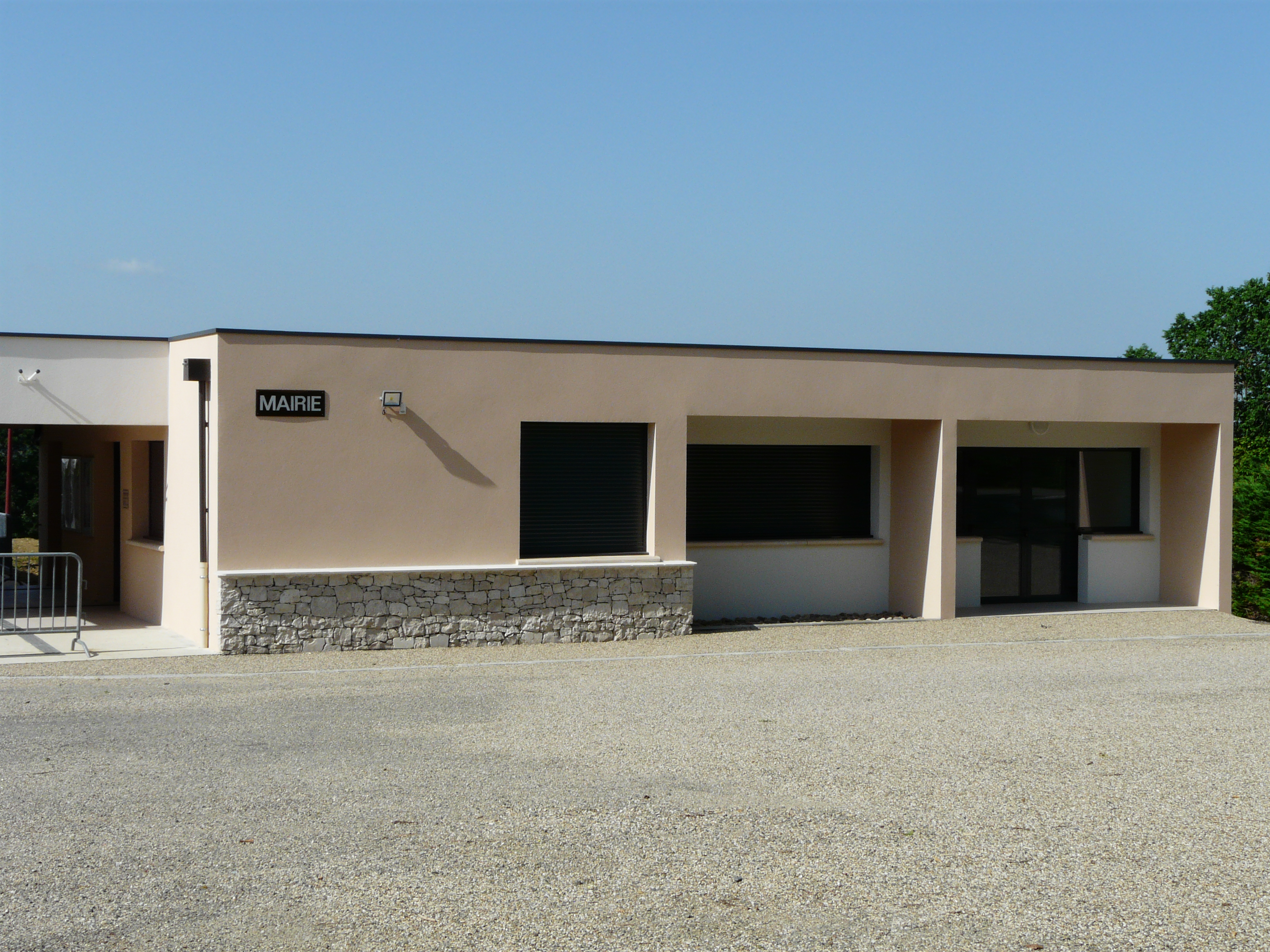
- The town hall in Calignac
- Location of Calignac
- Location within France Location within Nouvelle-Aquitaine
- Coordinates: 44°08′03″N 0°24′56″E
- Country: France
- Region: Nouvelle-Aquitaine
- Department: Lot-et-Garonne
- Arrondissement: Nérac
- Canton: L'Albret
- Intercommunality: Albret Communauté

Government
  - Mayor (2023–2026): Stéphanie David
- Area^{1}: 18.38 km^{2} (7.10 sq mi)
- Elevation: 140 m (460 ft)
- Highest elevation: 187 m (614 ft)
- Lowest elevation: 51 m (167 ft)
- Population (2023): 495
  - Density: 26.9/km^{2} (69.8/sq mi)
- Time zone: UTC+01:00 (CET)
  - Summer (DST): UTC+02:00 (CEST)
- INSEE/Postal code: 47045 /47600
- ^{1} French Land Register data, which excludes lakes, ponds, glaciers > 1 km^{2} (0.386 sq mi or 247 acres) and river estuaries.

Calignac (French pronunciation: [kaliɲak]; Occitan: Calinhac) is a commune in the Lot-et-Garonne department in south-western France.

== See also ==
- Communes of the Lot-et-Garonne department
