= Bourran =

- Commune
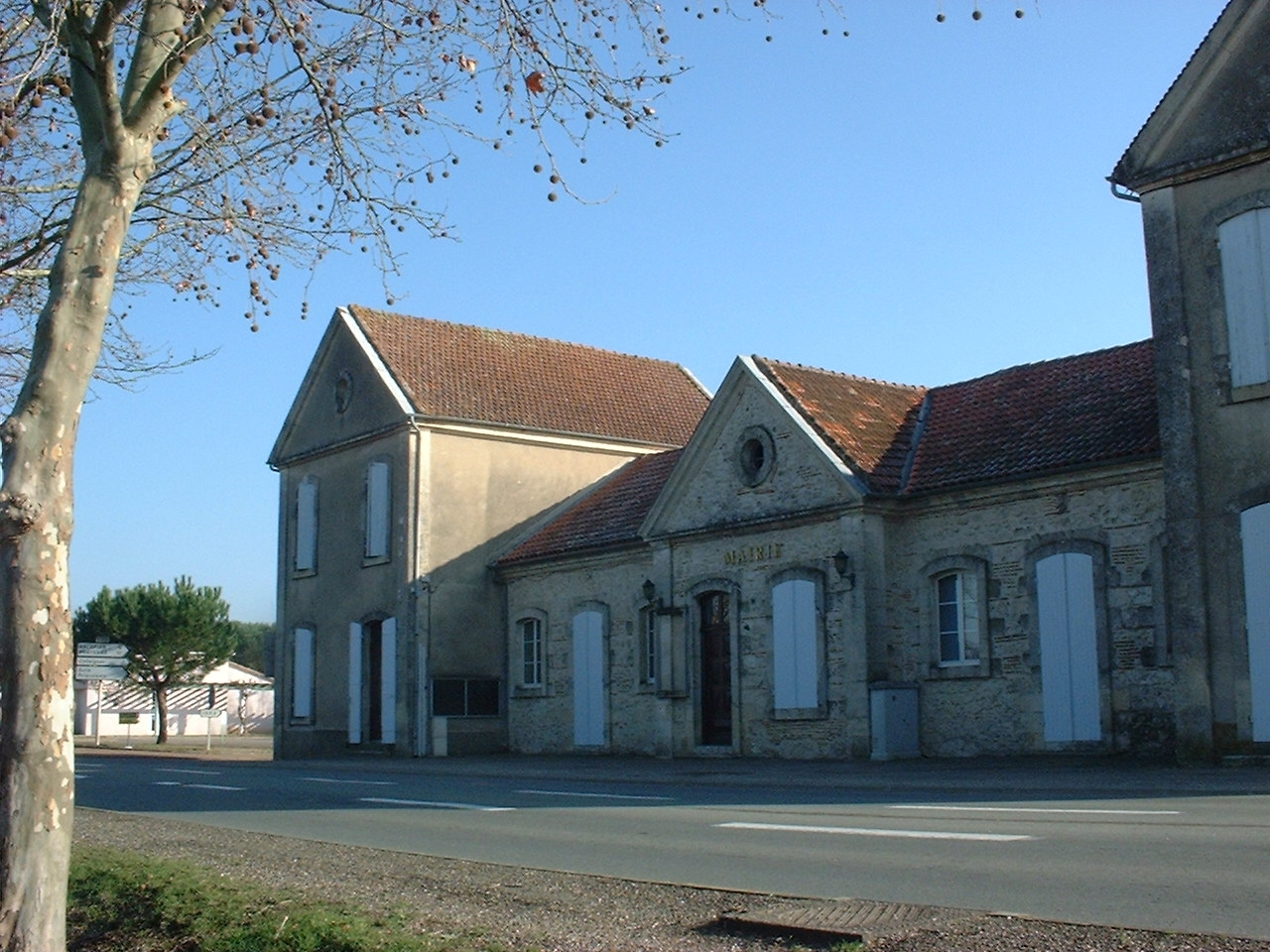
- The town hall in Bourran
- Location of Bourran
- Location within France Location within Nouvelle-Aquitaine
- Coordinates: 44°20′37″N 0°23′40″E
- Country: France
- Region: Nouvelle-Aquitaine
- Department: Lot-et-Garonne
- Arrondissement: Agen
- Canton: Le Confluent

Government
  - Mayor (2020–2026): Béatrice Piloni
- Area^{1}: 18.16 km^{2} (7.01 sq mi)
- Elevation: 32 m (105 ft)
- Highest elevation: 145 m (476 ft)
- Lowest elevation: 27 m (89 ft)
- Population (2023): 610
  - Density: 34/km^{2} (87/sq mi)
- Time zone: UTC+01:00 (CET)
  - Summer (DST): UTC+02:00 (CEST)
- INSEE/Postal code: 47038 /47320
- ^{1} French Land Register data, which excludes lakes, ponds, glaciers > 1 km^{2} (0.386 sq mi or 247 acres) and river estuaries.

Bourran (French pronunciation: [buʁɑ̃]; Occitan: Borran) is a commune in the Lot-et-Garonne department in southwestern France.

== Population ==
Historical population
Year	Pop.	±% p.a.
1968	661	—
1975	605	−1.26%
1982	608	+0.07%
1990	613	+0.10%
1999	578	−0.65%
2007	612	+0.72%
2012	579	−1.10%
2017	616	+1.25%
2023	610	−0.16%
Source: INSEE

== See also ==
- Communes of the Lot-et-Garonne department
