= Cours, Lot-et-Garonne =

Cours
- Commune
- Location of Cours
- Location within France Location within Nouvelle-Aquitaine
- Coordinates: 44°19′23″N 0°35′23″E
- Country: France
- Region: Nouvelle-Aquitaine
- Department: Lot-et-Garonne
- Arrondissement: Agen
- Canton: Le Confluent
- Intercommunality: Confluent et Coteaux de Prayssas

Government
  - Mayor (2020–2026): Nicolas Janaillac
- Area^{1}: 11.43 km^{2} (4.41 sq mi)
- Elevation: 160 m (520 ft)
- Highest elevation: 227 m (745 ft)
- Lowest elevation: 81 m (266 ft)
- Population (2023): 195
  - Density: 17.1/km^{2} (44.2/sq mi)
- Time zone: UTC+01:00 (CET)
  - Summer (DST): UTC+02:00 (CEST)
- INSEE/Postal code: 47073 /47360
- ^{1} French Land Register data, which excludes lakes, ponds, glaciers > 1 km^{2} (0.386 sq mi or 247 acres) and river estuaries.

Cours (Occitan: Curs) is a commune in the Lot-et-Garonne department in south-western France.

== See also ==
- Communes of the Lot-et-Garonne department
