= Andiran =

- Commune
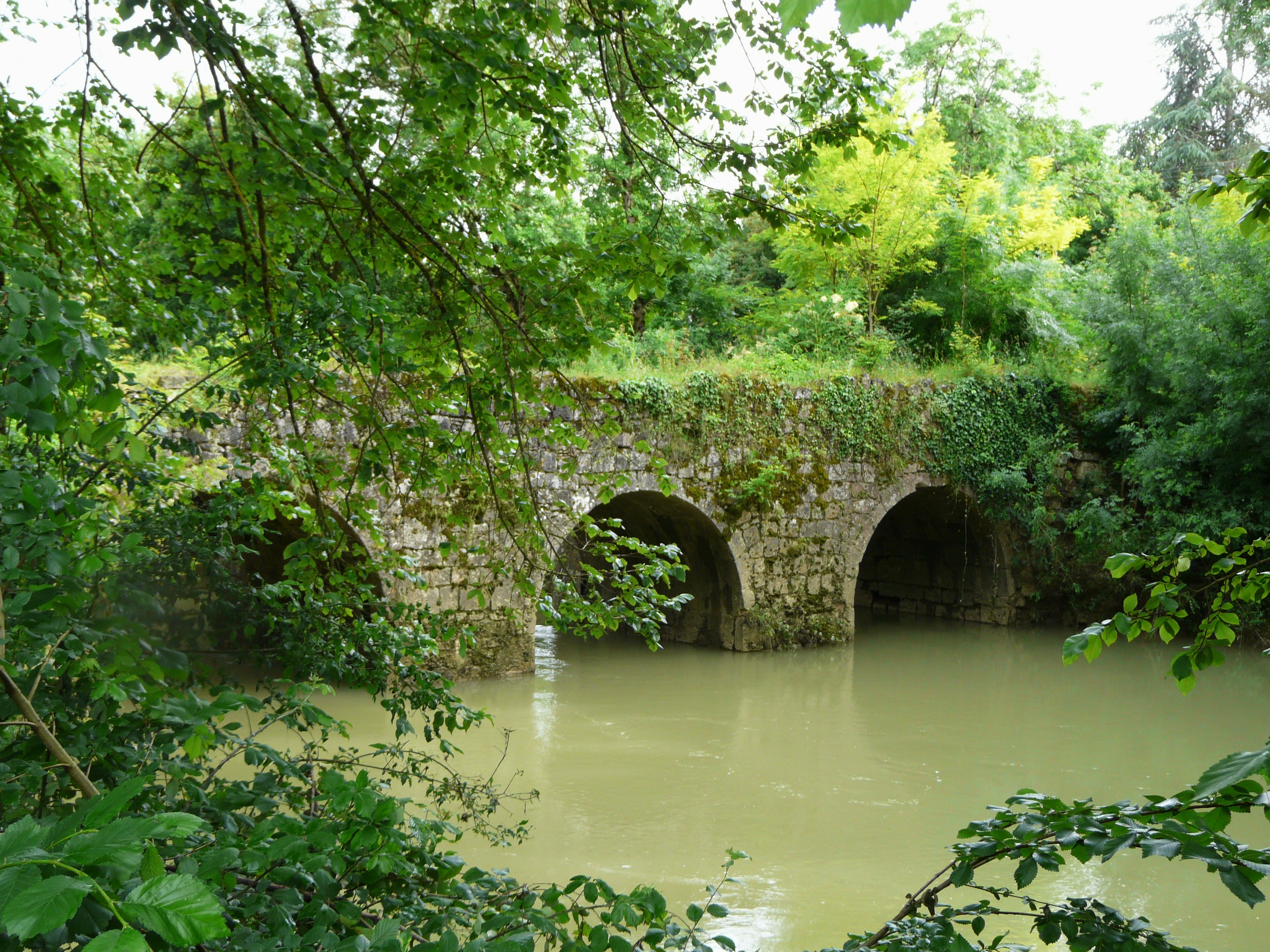
- The Tauziète Bridge
- Location of Andiran
- Location within France Location within Nouvelle-Aquitaine
- Coordinates: 44°05′55″N 0°16′44″E
- Country: France
- Region: Nouvelle-Aquitaine
- Department: Lot-et-Garonne
- Arrondissement: Nérac
- Canton: L'Albret
- Intercommunality: Albret Communauté

Government
  - Mayor (2020–2026): Lionel Labarthe
- Area^{1}: 9.89 km^{2} (3.82 sq mi)
- Elevation: 104 m (341 ft)
- Highest elevation: 123 m (404 ft)
- Lowest elevation: 43 m (141 ft)
- Population (2023): 260
  - Density: 26/km^{2} (68/sq mi)
- Time zone: UTC+01:00 (CET)
  - Summer (DST): UTC+02:00 (CEST)
- INSEE/Postal code: 47009 /47170
- ^{1} French Land Register data, which excludes lakes, ponds, glaciers > 1 km^{2} (0.386 sq mi or 247 acres) and river estuaries.

Andiran (French pronunciation: [ɑ̃diʁɑ̃]) is a commune in the Lot-et-Garonne department in southwestern France.

== Population ==
Historical population
Year	Pop.	±% p.a.
1968	289	—
1975	251	−1.99%
1982	233	−1.06%
1990	219	−0.77%
1999	226	+0.35%
2007	239	+0.70%
2012	215	−2.09%
2017	222	+0.64%
2023	260	+2.67%
Source: INSEE

== See also ==
- Communes of the Lot-et-Garonne department
