= Fieux =

- Commune
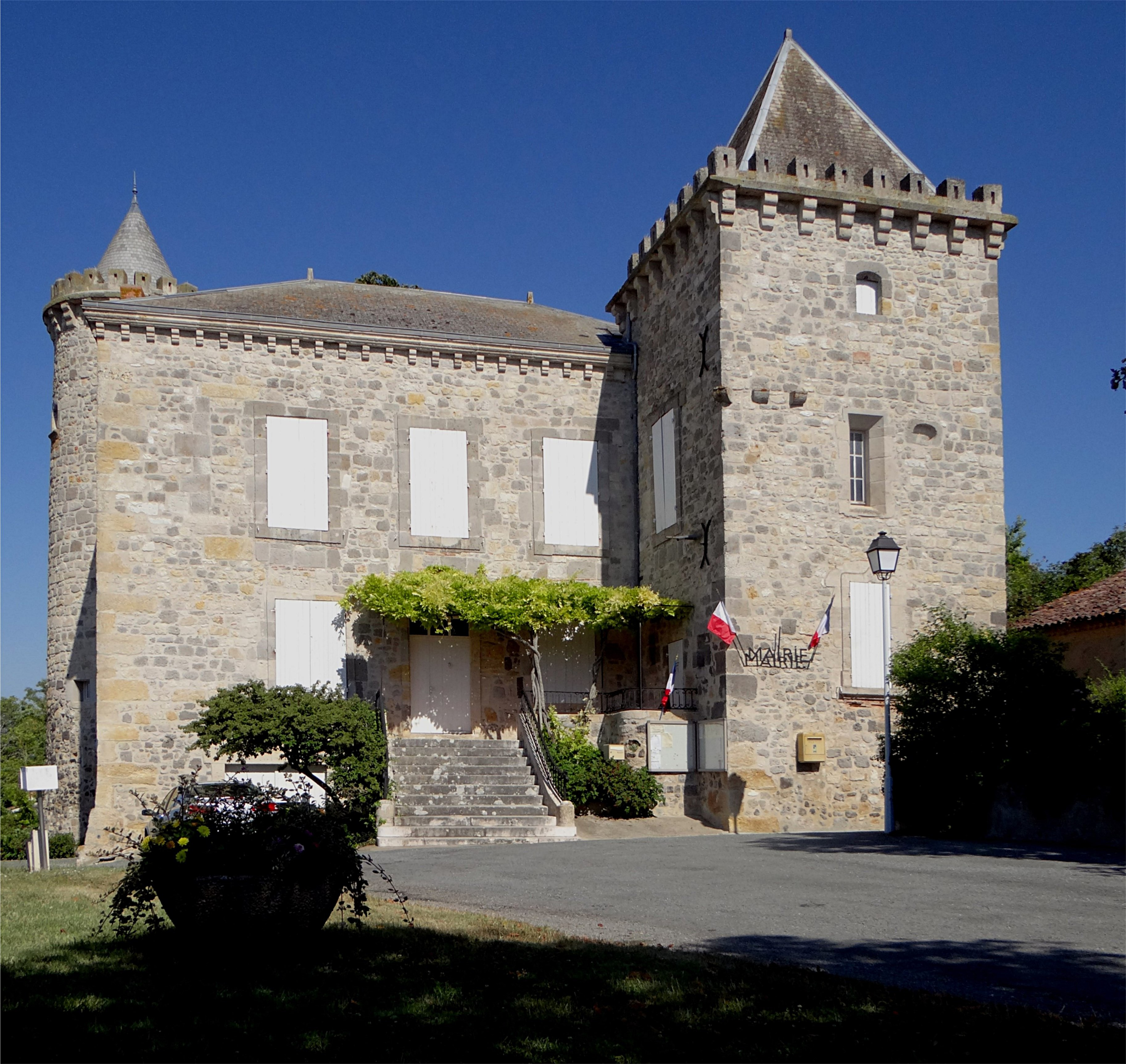
- Location of Fieux
- Location within France Location within Nouvelle-Aquitaine
- Coordinates: 44°05′31″N 0°25′30″E
- Country: France
- Region: Nouvelle-Aquitaine
- Department: Lot-et-Garonne
- Arrondissement: Nérac
- Canton: L'Albret
- Intercommunality: Albret Communauté

Government
  - Mayor (2020–2026): Joël Bernard Arevalillo
- Area^{1}: 14.85 km^{2} (5.73 sq mi)
- Elevation: 173 m (568 ft)
- Highest elevation: 189 m (620 ft)
- Lowest elevation: 58 m (190 ft)
- Population (2023): 323
  - Density: 21.8/km^{2} (56.3/sq mi)
- Time zone: UTC+01:00 (CET)
  - Summer (DST): UTC+02:00 (CEST)
- INSEE/Postal code: 47098 /47600
- ^{1} French Land Register data, which excludes lakes, ponds, glaciers > 1 km^{2} (0.386 sq mi or 247 acres) and river estuaries.

Fieux (French pronunciation: [fjø]; Occitan: Hius) is a commune in the Lot-et-Garonne department in south-western France.

== See also ==
- Communes of the Lot-et-Garonne department
