= Saumont =

- Commune
- Location of Saumont
- Location within France Location within Nouvelle-Aquitaine
- Coordinates: 44°07′22″N 0°27′31″E
- Country: France
- Region: Nouvelle-Aquitaine
- Department: Lot-et-Garonne
- Arrondissement: Nérac
- Canton: L'Albret
- Intercommunality: Albret Communauté

Government
  - Mayor (2020–2026): Jean-Louis Lalaude
- Area^{1}: 6.74 km^{2} (2.60 sq mi)
- Elevation: 120 m (390 ft)
- Highest elevation: 152 m (499 ft)
- Lowest elevation: 56 m (184 ft)
- Population (2023): 240
  - Density: 36/km^{2} (92/sq mi)
- Time zone: UTC+01:00 (CET)
  - Summer (DST): UTC+02:00 (CEST)
- INSEE/Postal code: 47287 /47600
- ^{1} French Land Register data, which excludes lakes, ponds, glaciers > 1 km^{2} (0.386 sq mi or 247 acres) and river estuaries.

Saumont (French pronunciation: [somɔ̃]; Occitan: Lo Saumont) is a commune in the Lot-et-Garonne department in south-western France.

== See also ==
- Communes of the Lot-et-Garonne department
