= Canton of Le Confluent =

Coordinates: 44.30°N 0.34°E

The canton of Le Confluent is an administrative division of the Lot-et-Garonne department, southwestern France. It was created at the French canton reorganisation which came into effect in March 2015. Its seat is in Aiguillon.

It consists of the following communes:

1. Aiguillon
2. Bazens
3. Bourran
4. Clermont-Dessous
5. Cours
6. Frégimont
7. Galapian
8. Granges-sur-Lot
9. Lacépède
10. Lagarrigue
11. Laugnac
12. Lusignan-Petit
13. Madaillan
14. Montpezat
15. Nicole
16. Port-Sainte-Marie
17. Prayssas
18. Saint-Salvy
19. Saint-Sardos
20. Sembas
