= Moncaut =

- Commune
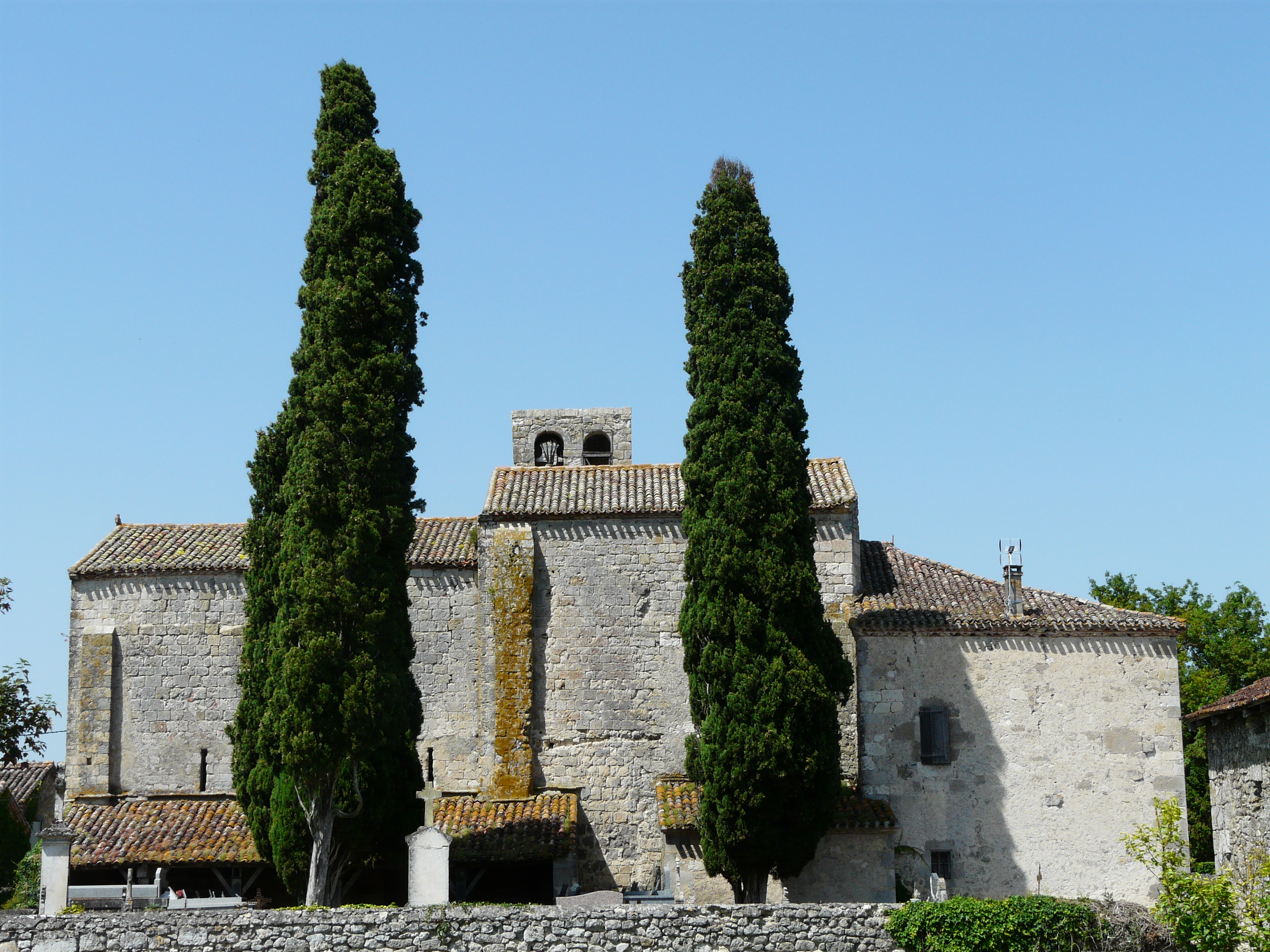
- The church in Fontarède, Moncaut

- Coat of arms
- Location of Moncaut
- Location within France Location within Nouvelle-Aquitaine
- Coordinates: 44°08′33″N 0°30′00″E
- Country: France
- Region: Nouvelle-Aquitaine
- Department: Lot-et-Garonne
- Arrondissement: Nérac
- Canton: L'Albret
- Intercommunality: Albret Communauté

Government
  - Mayor (2020–2026): Francis Malisani
- Area^{1}: 15.76 km^{2} (6.08 sq mi)
- Elevation: 198 m (650 ft)
- Highest elevation: 202 m (663 ft)
- Lowest elevation: 63 m (207 ft)
- Population (2023): 589
  - Density: 37.4/km^{2} (96.8/sq mi)
- Time zone: UTC+01:00 (CET)
  - Summer (DST): UTC+02:00 (CEST)
- INSEE/Postal code: 47172 /47310
- ^{1} French Land Register data, which excludes lakes, ponds, glaciers > 1 km^{2} (0.386 sq mi or 247 acres) and river estuaries.

Moncaut is a commune in the Lot-et-Garonne department in south-western France.

== See also ==
- Communes of the Lot-et-Garonne department
