= Sainte-Maure-de-Peyriac =

- Commune
- Coat of arms
- Location of Sainte-Maure-de-Peyriac
- Location within France Location within Nouvelle-Aquitaine
- Coordinates: 44°00′50″N 0°09′11″E
- Country: France
- Region: Nouvelle-Aquitaine
- Department: Lot-et-Garonne
- Arrondissement: Nérac
- Canton: L'Albret

Government
  - Mayor (2023–2026): Thierry Planté
- Area^{1}: 23.06 km^{2} (8.90 sq mi)
- Elevation: 160 m (520 ft)
- Highest elevation: 164 m (538 ft)
- Lowest elevation: 64 m (210 ft)
- Population (2023): 305
  - Density: 13.2/km^{2} (34.3/sq mi)
- Time zone: UTC+01:00 (CET)
  - Summer (DST): UTC+02:00 (CEST)
- INSEE/Postal code: 47258 /47170
- ^{1} French Land Register data, which excludes lakes, ponds, glaciers > 1 km^{2} (0.386 sq mi or 247 acres) and river estuaries.

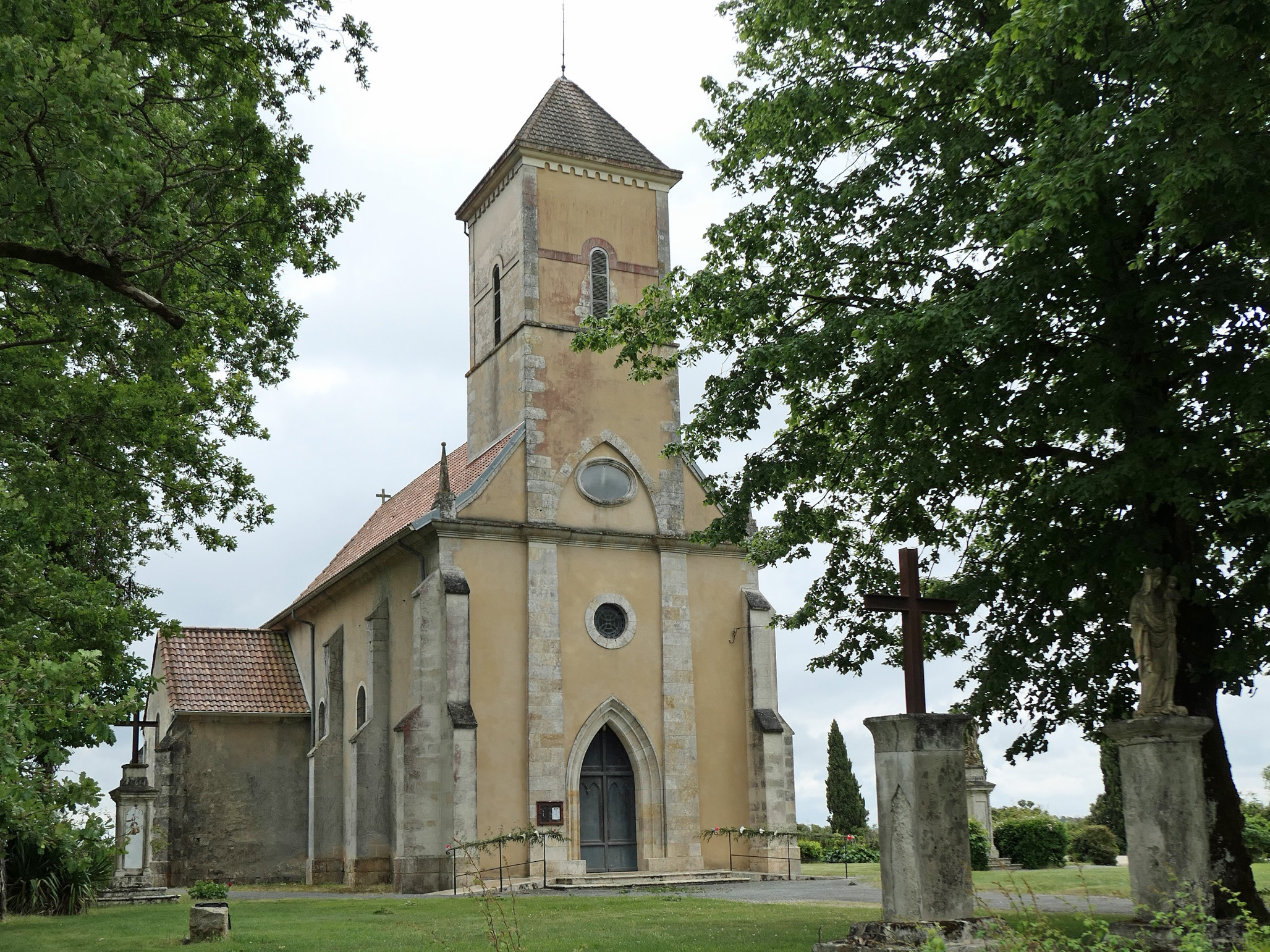
Saint-Celse Church in Sainte-Maure-de-Peyriac

Sainte-Maure-de-Peyriac (French pronunciation: [sɛ̃t moʁ də peʁjak]; Gascon: Senta Maura de Peiriac) is a commune in the Lot-et-Garonne department in south-western France.

== See also ==
- Communes of the Lot-et-Garonne department
