= Espiens =

- Commune
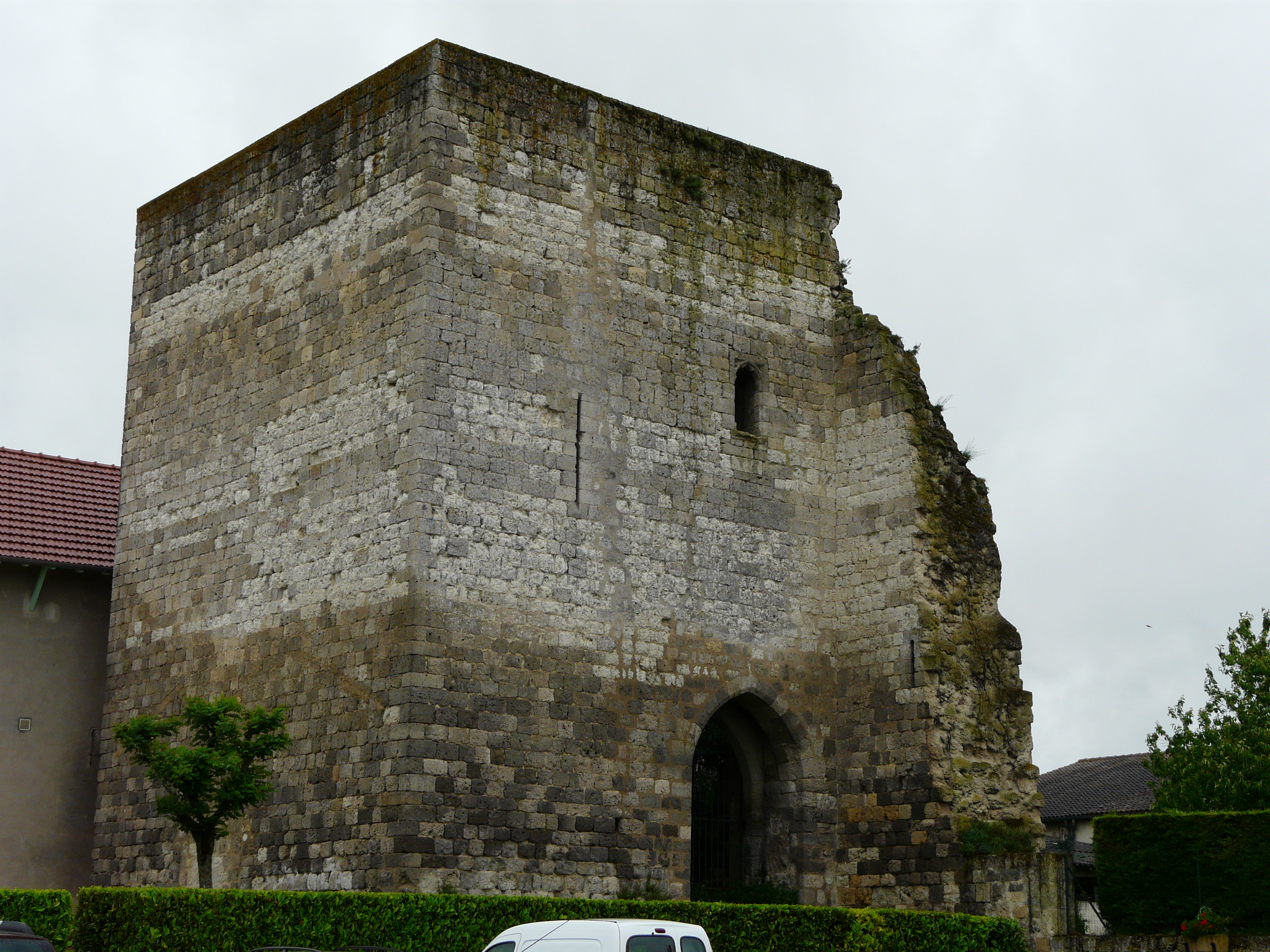
- The tower in Espiens
- Location of Espiens
- Location within France Location within Nouvelle-Aquitaine
- Coordinates: 44°10′12″N 0°22′42″E
- Country: France
- Region: Nouvelle-Aquitaine
- Department: Lot-et-Garonne
- Arrondissement: Nérac
- Canton: L'Albret
- Intercommunality: Albret Communauté

Government
  - Mayor (2020–2026): Serge Larroche
- Area^{1}: 17.48 km^{2} (6.75 sq mi)
- Elevation: 190 m (620 ft)
- Highest elevation: 196 m (643 ft)
- Lowest elevation: 46 m (151 ft)
- Population (2023): 358
  - Density: 20.5/km^{2} (53.0/sq mi)
- Time zone: UTC+01:00 (CET)
  - Summer (DST): UTC+02:00 (CEST)
- INSEE/Postal code: 47090 /47600
- ^{1} French Land Register data, which excludes lakes, ponds, glaciers > 1 km^{2} (0.386 sq mi or 247 acres) and river estuaries.

Espiens is a commune in the Lot-et-Garonne department in south-western France.

== See also ==
- Communes of the Lot-et-Garonne department
