= Frégimont =

- Commune
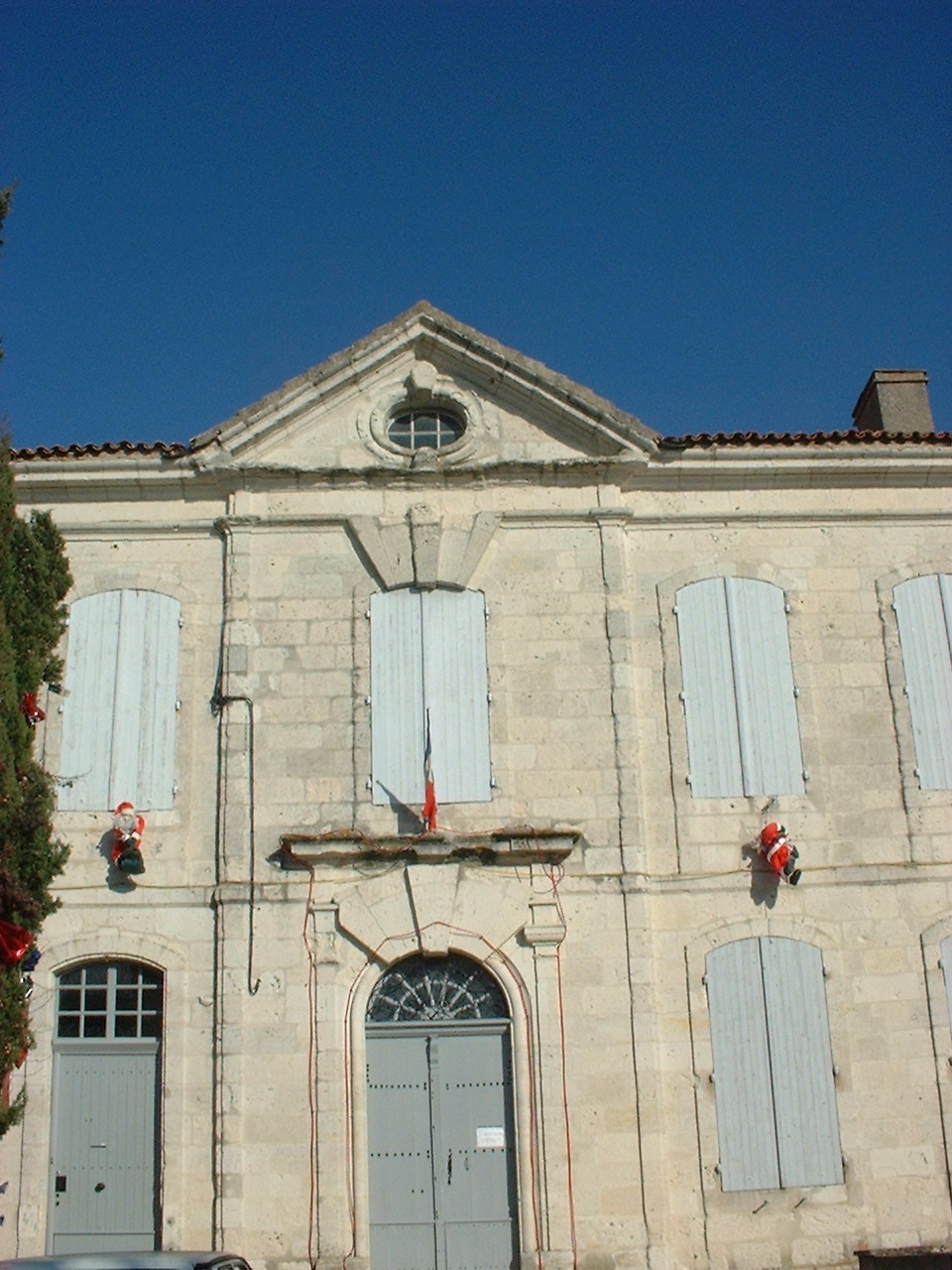
- The town hall in Frégimont

- Coat of arms
- Location of Frégimont
- Location within France Location within Nouvelle-Aquitaine
- Coordinates: 44°16′43″N 0°27′33″E
- Country: France
- Region: Nouvelle-Aquitaine
- Department: Lot-et-Garonne
- Arrondissement: Agen
- Canton: Le Confluent
- Intercommunality: Confluent et Coteaux de Prayssas

Government
  - Mayor (2020–2026): Alain Paladin
- Area^{1}: 7.59 km^{2} (2.93 sq mi)
- Elevation: 170 m (560 ft)
- Highest elevation: 200 m (660 ft)
- Lowest elevation: 57 m (187 ft)
- Population (2023): 271
  - Density: 35.7/km^{2} (92.5/sq mi)
- Time zone: UTC+01:00 (CET)
  - Summer (DST): UTC+02:00 (CEST)
- INSEE/Postal code: 47104 /47360
- ^{1} French Land Register data, which excludes lakes, ponds, glaciers > 1 km^{2} (0.386 sq mi or 247 acres) and river estuaries.

Frégimont (French pronunciation: [fʁeʒimɔ̃]; Occitan: Fregimont) is a commune in the Lot-et-Garonne department in south-western France.

== See also ==
- Communes of the Lot-et-Garonne department
