= Canton of L'Albret =

Coordinates: 44.14°N 0.34°E

The canton of L'Albret is an administrative division of the Lot-et-Garonne department, southwestern France. It was created at the French canton reorganisation which came into effect in March 2015. Its seat is in Nérac.

It consists of the following communes:

1. Andiran
2. Calignac
3. Espiens
4. Fieux
5. Francescas
6. Fréchou
7. Lamontjoie
8. Lannes
9. Lasserre
10. Mézin
11. Moncaut
12. Moncrabeau
13. Montagnac-sur-Auvignon
14. Nérac
15. Nomdieu
16. Poudenas
17. Réaup-Lisse
18. Sainte-Maure-de-Peyriac
19. Saint-Pé-Saint-Simon
20. Saint-Vincent-de-Lamontjoie
21. Saumont
22. Sos
