= Saint-Salvy =

- Commune
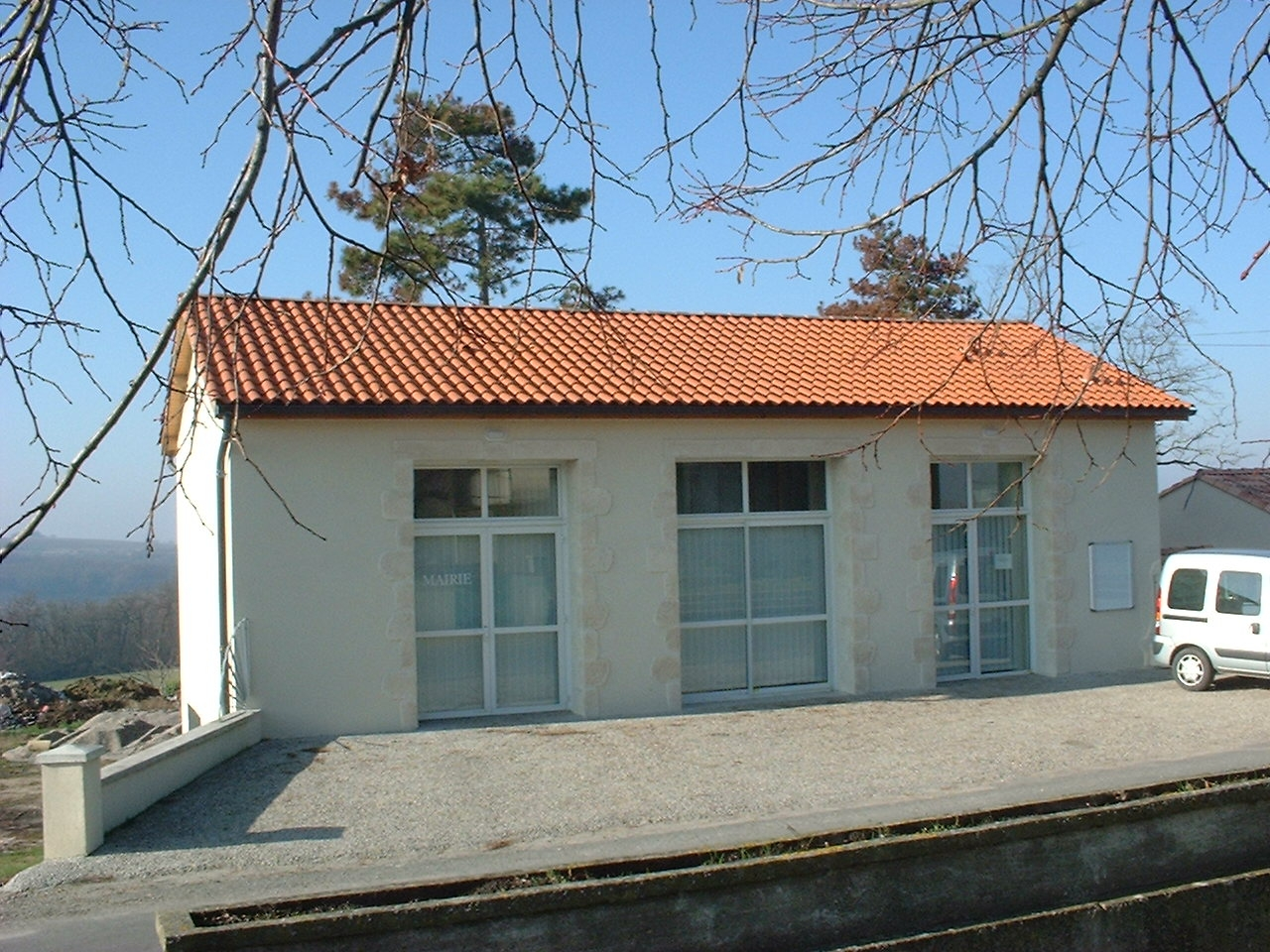
- The town hall in Saint-Salvy
- Location of Saint-Salvy
- Location within France Location within Nouvelle-Aquitaine
- Coordinates: 44°18′02″N 0°26′20″E
- Country: France
- Region: Nouvelle-Aquitaine
- Department: Lot-et-Garonne
- Arrondissement: Agen
- Canton: Le Confluent

Government
  - Mayor (2020–2026): Jacques Visintin
- Area^{1}: 9.26 km^{2} (3.58 sq mi)
- Highest elevation: 184 m (604 ft)
- Lowest elevation: 63 m (207 ft)
- Population (2023): 200
  - Density: 22/km^{2} (56/sq mi)
- Time zone: UTC+01:00 (CET)
  - Summer (DST): UTC+02:00 (CEST)
- INSEE/Postal code: 47275 /47360
- ^{1} French Land Register data, which excludes lakes, ponds, glaciers > 1 km^{2} (0.386 sq mi or 247 acres) and river estuaries.

Saint-Salvy (French pronunciation: [sɛ̃ salvi]; Occitan: Sent Sauvi) is a commune in the Lot-et-Garonne department in south-western France.

== See also ==
- Communes of the Lot-et-Garonne department
