= Saint-Sardos, Lot-et-Garonne =

Saint-Sardos
- Commune
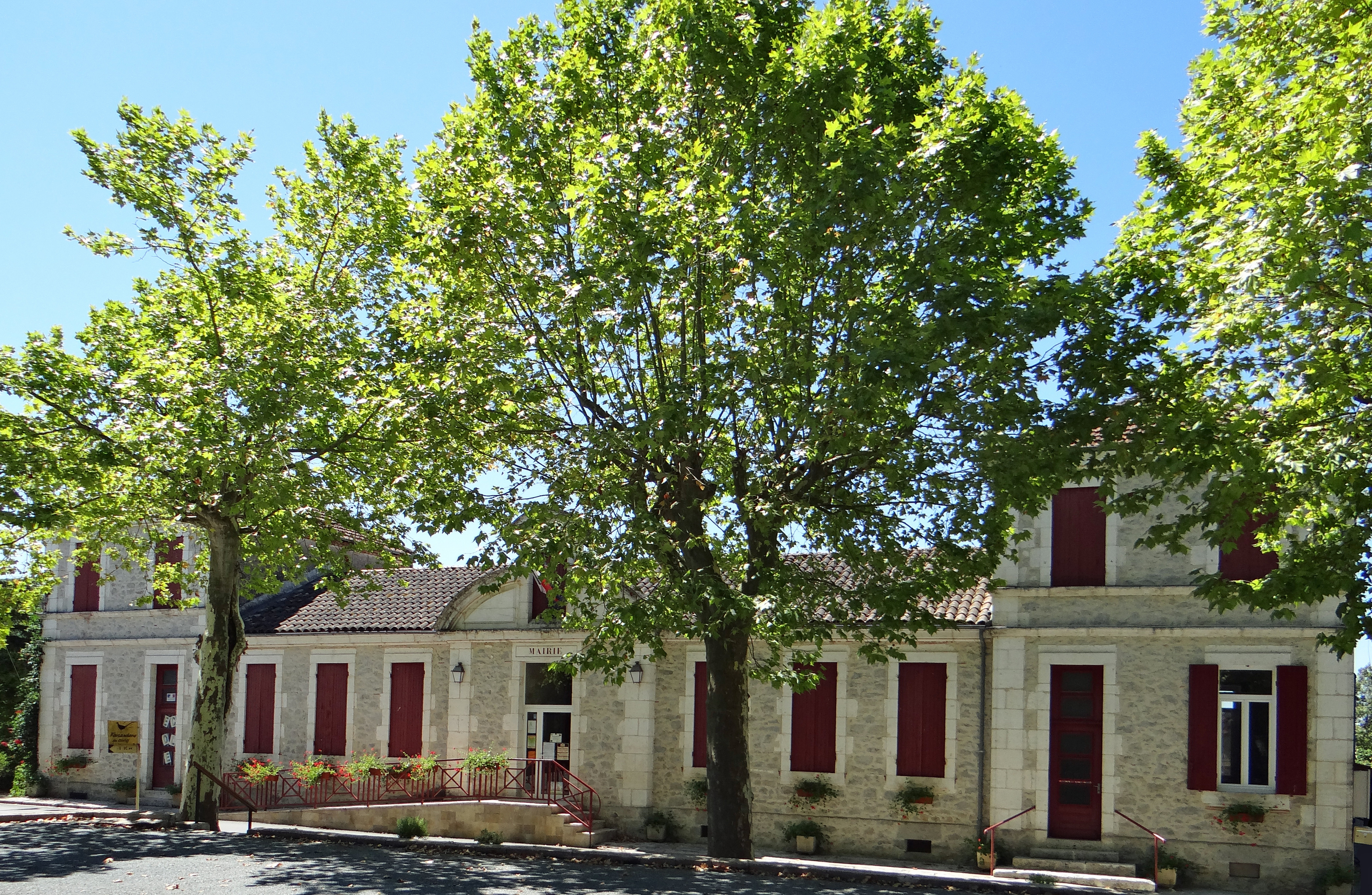
- Town hall

- Coat of arms
- Location of Saint-Sardos
- Location within France Location within Nouvelle-Aquitaine
- Coordinates: 44°20′28″N 0°28′41″E
- Country: France
- Region: Nouvelle-Aquitaine
- Department: Lot-et-Garonne
- Arrondissement: Agen
- Canton: Le Confluent

Government
  - Mayor (2023–2026): Marie Thérèse Merot
- Area^{1}: 14.46 km^{2} (5.58 sq mi)
- Elevation: 90 m (300 ft)
- Highest elevation: 187 m (614 ft)
- Lowest elevation: 42 m (138 ft)
- Population (2023): 289
  - Density: 20.0/km^{2} (51.8/sq mi)
- Time zone: UTC+01:00 (CET)
  - Summer (DST): UTC+02:00 (CEST)
- INSEE/Postal code: 47276 /47360
- ^{1} French Land Register data, which excludes lakes, ponds, glaciers > 1 km^{2} (0.386 sq mi or 247 acres) and river estuaries.

Saint-Sardos (French pronunciation: [sɛ̃ saʁdɔs]; Occitan: Sent Sardòs) is a commune in the Lot-et-Garonne department in south-western France.

== See also ==
- Communes of the Lot-et-Garonne department
