= Prayssas =

- Commune
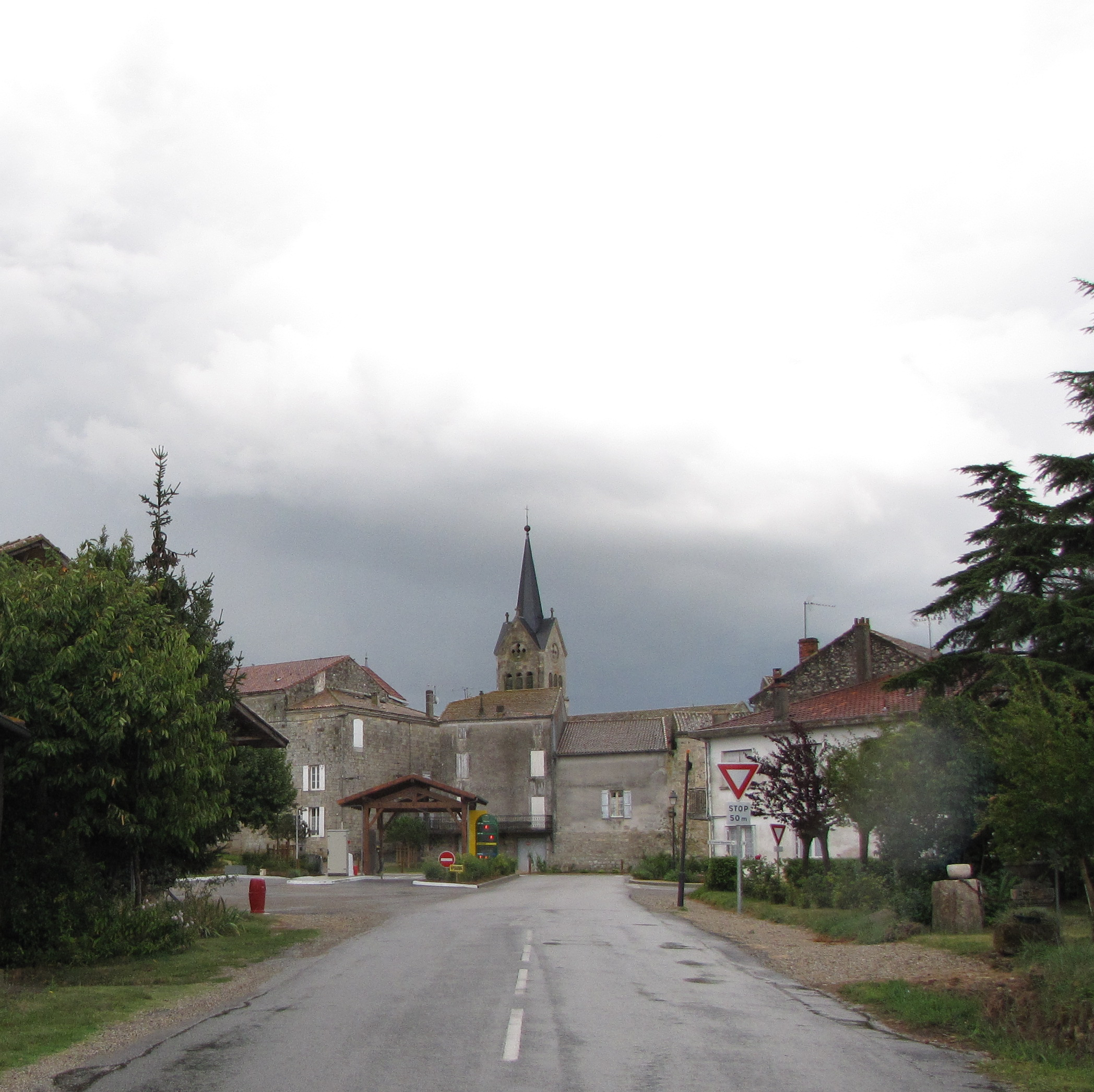
- The road into Prayssas

- Coat of arms
- Location of Prayssas
- Location within France Location within Nouvelle-Aquitaine
- Coordinates: 44°17′19″N 0°30′35″E
- Country: France
- Region: Nouvelle-Aquitaine
- Department: Lot-et-Garonne
- Arrondissement: Agen
- Canton: Le Confluent
- Intercommunality: Confluent et Coteaux de Prayssas

Government
  - Mayor (2020–2026): Philippe Bousquier
- Area^{1}: 26.48 km^{2} (10.22 sq mi)
- Elevation: 185 m (607 ft)
- Highest elevation: 207 m (679 ft)
- Lowest elevation: 66 m (217 ft)
- Population (2023): 993
  - Density: 37.5/km^{2} (97.1/sq mi)
- Time zone: UTC+01:00 (CET)
  - Summer (DST): UTC+02:00 (CEST)
- INSEE/Postal code: 47213 /47360
- ^{1} French Land Register data, which excludes lakes, ponds, glaciers > 1 km^{2} (0.386 sq mi or 247 acres) and river estuaries.

Prayssas (French pronunciation: [pʁɛsas]; Occitan: Preishàs) is a commune in the Lot-et-Garonne department in south-western France.

Prayssas and the surrounding area is home to a significant British and international expat community, which counts among its members the composer Patrick Doyle and the television presenter Nick Hewer. The French Athlete Gabriel Tual also originates from Prayssas.

== See also ==
- Communes of the Lot-et-Garonne department
