= Galapian =

- Commune
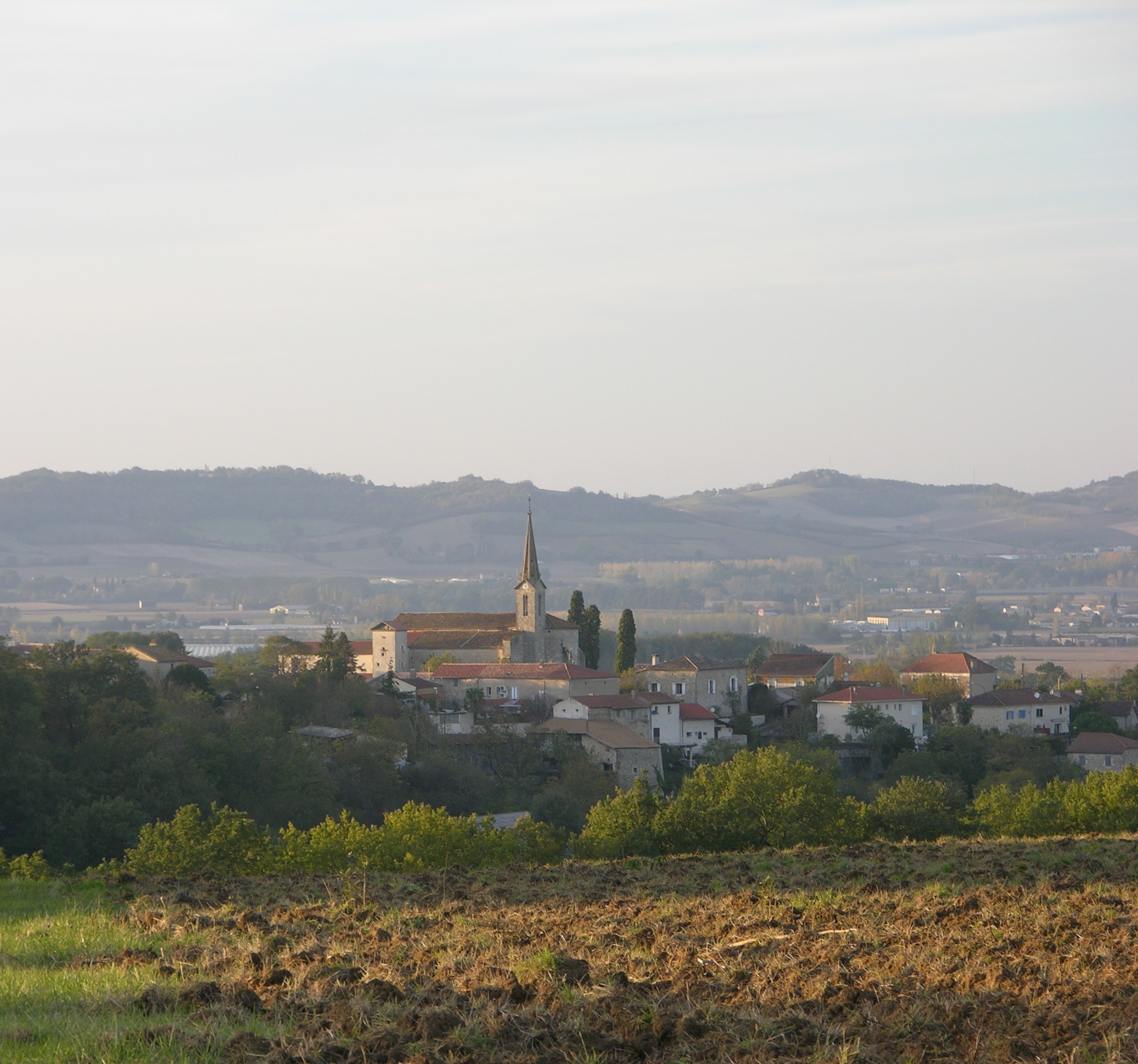
- A general view of Galapian
- Location of Galapian
- Location within France Location within Nouvelle-Aquitaine
- Coordinates: 44°17′59″N 0°24′52″E
- Country: France
- Region: Nouvelle-Aquitaine
- Department: Lot-et-Garonne
- Arrondissement: Agen
- Canton: Le Confluent
- Intercommunality: Confluent et Coteaux de Prayssas

Government
  - Mayor (2020–2026): Georges Nicole Lebon
- Area^{1}: 9.25 km^{2} (3.57 sq mi)
- Elevation: 120 m (390 ft)
- Highest elevation: 180 m (590 ft)
- Lowest elevation: 44 m (144 ft)
- Population (2023): 333
  - Density: 36.0/km^{2} (93.2/sq mi)
- Time zone: UTC+01:00 (CET)
  - Summer (DST): UTC+02:00 (CEST)
- INSEE/Postal code: 47107 /47190
- ^{1} French Land Register data, which excludes lakes, ponds, glaciers > 1 km^{2} (0.386 sq mi or 247 acres) and river estuaries.

Galapian (French pronunciation: [ɡalapjɑ̃]) is a commune in the Lot-et-Garonne department in south-western France.

== See also ==
- Communes of the Lot-et-Garonne department
