= Francescas =

- Commune
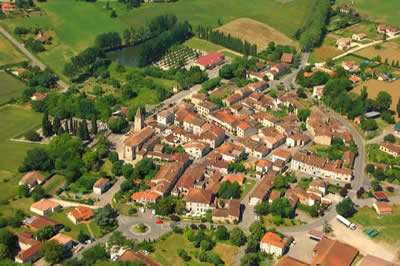
- An aerial view of Francescas

- Coat of arms
- Location of Francescas
- Location within France Location within Nouvelle-Aquitaine
- Coordinates: 44°03′52″N 0°25′44″E
- Country: France
- Region: Nouvelle-Aquitaine
- Department: Lot-et-Garonne
- Arrondissement: Nérac
- Canton: L'Albret

Government
  - Mayor (2020–2026): Paulette Laborde
- Area^{1}: 21.23 km^{2} (8.20 sq mi)
- Elevation: 127 m (417 ft)
- Highest elevation: 171 m (561 ft)
- Lowest elevation: 63 m (207 ft)
- Population (2023): 750
  - Density: 35/km^{2} (91/sq mi)
- Time zone: UTC+01:00 (CET)
  - Summer (DST): UTC+02:00 (CEST)
- INSEE/Postal code: 47102 /47600
- ^{1} French Land Register data, which excludes lakes, ponds, glaciers > 1 km^{2} (0.386 sq mi or 247 acres) and river estuaries.

Francescas is a commune in the Lot-et-Garonne department in south-western France. While its inhabitants number less than eight hundred, it is neither isolated, nor without commerce. It has a bakery, grocery, butcher, gas station/news agent, bank, pharmacy, post office, hairdresser, tailor, small bar/hotel, restaurant, small regional museum, and gendarmerie.

== Geography ==
Francescas is located 22 km (14 mi) Southwest of Agen, between Bordeaux and Toulouse.

== Economy ==
The most celebrated regional specialty is foie gras, specially prepared livers of geese and ducks, seasoned and stuffed with regional truffles. Confit (preserved goose and duck) is very famous and Francescas is a part of the Armagnac region.

== History ==
Francescas was a Frankish territory ('Escas' is roughly hectare) - That means "land of the Franks".

977-1059: The southern border of the city of Nitiobroges (this will be later Agen and the diocese until the 11th century) would have followed, from west to east, a line from the source of the Advance to reach, by Réaup, The Fréchou, the Hitte, Francescas, Astaffort, the Garonne to Auvillars.

1013: The Lordship of Francescas was given to the abbey of Saint-Pierre Condom by Hugues de Gascogne, Bishop of Agen in 1013, hereditary Dukes of Gascony. Since condom was not yet erected into a bishopric, it is therefore the abbots, who were Lords of Francescas. So there is a church on that date in the agglomeration and cultivated land, which depend.

1100-1200: The archdeaconry of Bruilhois included in the 12th and 13th centuries also the Viscount Bruilhois cities or towns of Auvillars, Dunes, Sistels Astafort, Barbonvielle La Montjoie Francescas Ligardes, The Roumieu, Caussens, Béraut, Cassaigne Condom, The Ressingle, Montreal, Fourcès, Sainte Maure, Saint Pé Saint Simon, Sos, Gueyze, Meylan, St. Pau, Réaup, Boussès, Durance, Saint Julien, Ambrus, Xaintrailles, Thouars, Feugarolles, Bruch, Lavardac, Nerac, Mézin etc.

Francescas belonged in the 11th century to the abbaye of Gourdon. The construction of the city was prior to the walled towns of Agen, which dates from the 12th and 13th centuries. In 1369, Charles V of France offered the city of Francescas to the Comte d'Armagnac. Francescas also became the seat of a bailiwick of 1264 which lasted until the French Revolution. The church and a town (villa) are quoted in 1161 among the goods of the abbey of Condom, in P. Simon. Siege of bailiwick in 1264 (Samazeuilh). According to Abbe Barrère, the abbot of Condom and the King conclude a pareage in 1285, as a result of customs which were granted to the city, it having 4 consuls. In 1286, a castrum mention is held by the abbot of Condom, Gers and the King of France.

Etienne de Vignolles, called La Hire, (Born 1390 - died 11 January 1443) was a French military commander during the Hundred Years' War. He fought alongside Joan of Arc in the campaigns of 1429. He owned a house in Francescas, which is still there.

The share of the Bishop of Condom was auctioned in 1576 and redeemed in 1582 by the lord of Lasserre, Jean Paul 's Esparbes Lussan; the remains of the latter was near the door Larque south, succeeding to the old episcopal residence. The settlement was enclosed by a strong fortification, surrounded by moats, and opened with 4 doors (of Bordeaux, the Well of Larque, Newfoundland or Ligardes), a fortress was mentioned in the city at the end of the 16th century. Two blockhouses were destroyed in 1590 for the safety of residents. From mid-16th century up to 1621, the inhabitants inside Francescas supported religious struggles, and therefore the walls are constantly being repaired. Larque gate was rebuilt during the 1st quarter of the 17th century. The paving of streets and the alignment contained in the decisions of mid-17th century. In 1660, the gate of Bordeaux fell into ruin; in the years 1770–1780, the fortifications that no longer serve are definitely demolished and another gate is destroyed. A number of houses have been rebuilt in the 2nd half of the 18th and early 19th centuries, the extension of the village 's made along roads, particularly in northern and east part of Francescas.

== See also ==
- Communes of the Lot-et-Garonne department
