= Loubès-Bernac =

- Commune
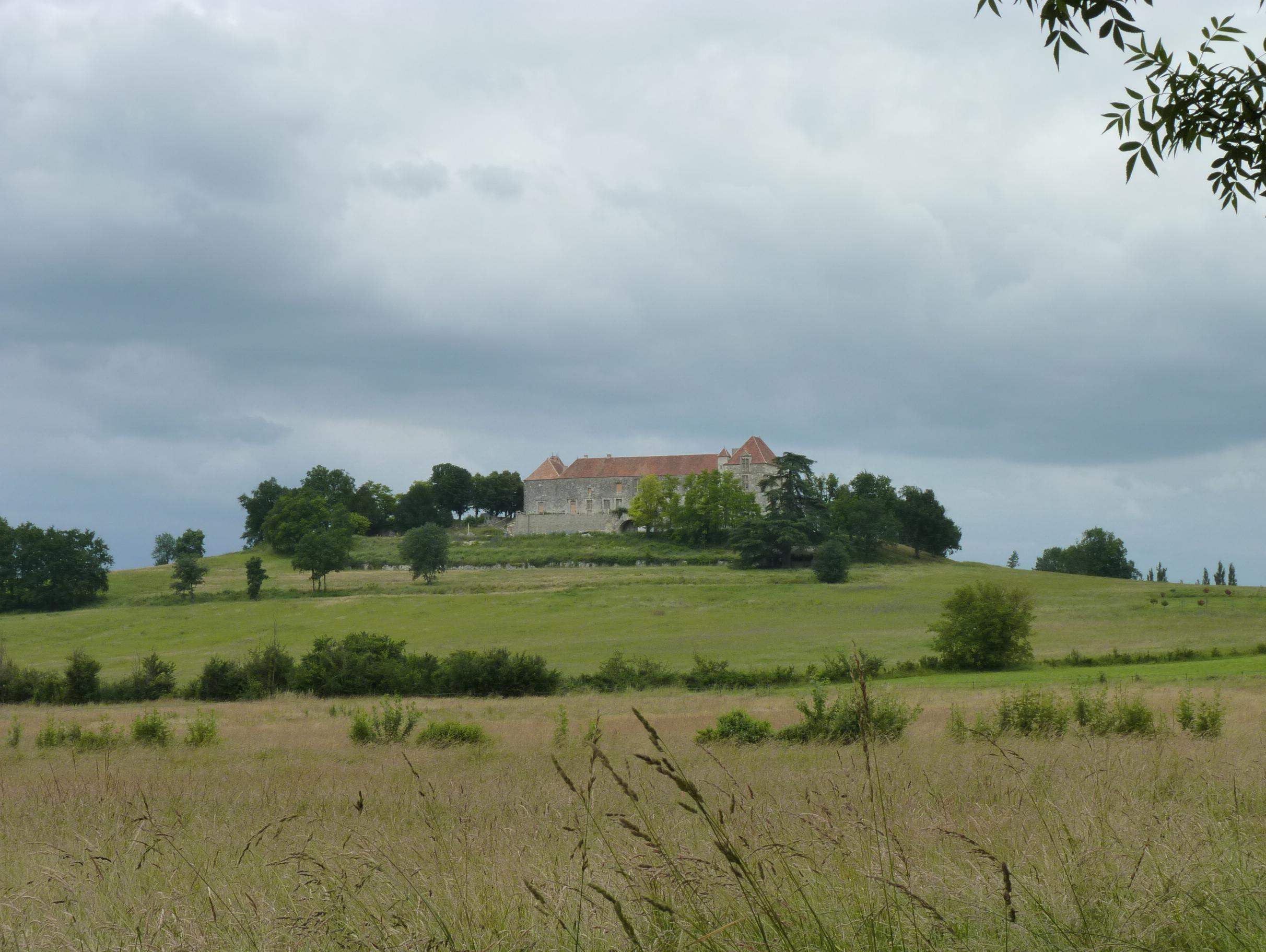
- Château de Théobon
- Location of Loubès-Bernac
- Location within France Location within Nouvelle-Aquitaine
- Coordinates: 44°43′54″N 0°17′42″E
- Country: France
- Region: Nouvelle-Aquitaine
- Department: Lot-et-Garonne
- Arrondissement: Marmande
- Canton: Les Coteaux de Guyenne
- Intercommunality: CC du Pays de Duras

Government
  - Mayor (2020–2026): Joël Kleiber
- Area^{1}: 19.31 km^{2} (7.46 sq mi)
- Elevation: 150 m (490 ft)
- Highest elevation: 187 m (614 ft)
- Lowest elevation: 74 m (243 ft)
- Population (2023): 407
  - Density: 21.1/km^{2} (54.6/sq mi)
- Time zone: UTC+01:00 (CET)
  - Summer (DST): UTC+02:00 (CEST)
- INSEE/Postal code: 47151 /47120
- ^{1} French Land Register data, which excludes lakes, ponds, glaciers > 1 km^{2} (0.386 sq mi or 247 acres) and river estuaries.

Loubès-Bernac (French pronunciation: [lubɛs bɛʁnak]; Occitan: Lobés e Bernac) is a commune in the Lot-et-Garonne department in south-western France.

== See also ==
- Communes of the Lot-et-Garonne department
