= Lagarrigue, Lot-et-Garonne =

Lagarrigue
- Commune
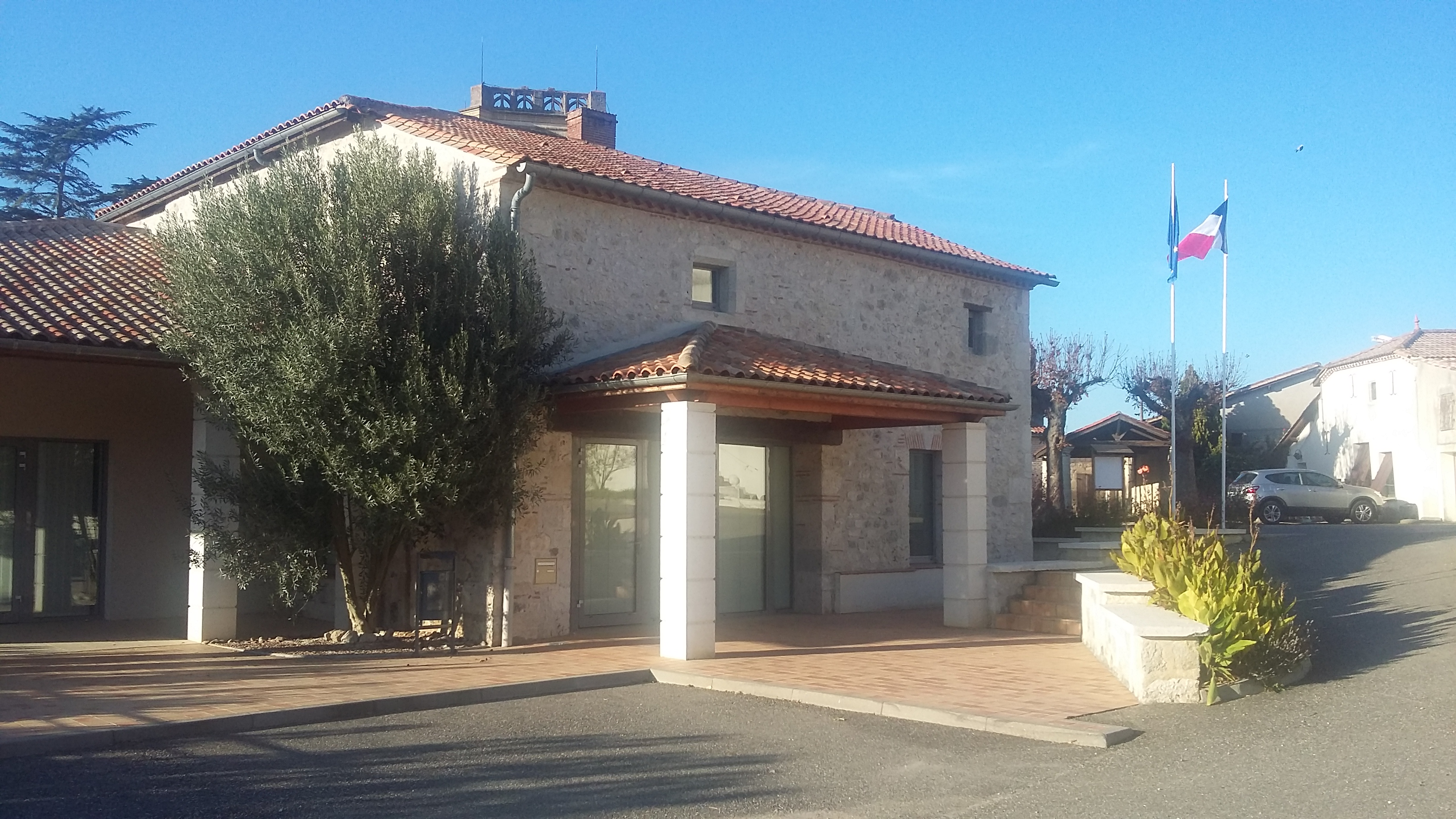
- Town hall
- Location of Lagarrigue
- Location within France Location within Nouvelle-Aquitaine
- Coordinates: 44°17′51″N 0°22′48″E
- Country: France
- Region: Nouvelle-Aquitaine
- Department: Lot-et-Garonne
- Arrondissement: Agen
- Canton: Le Confluent
- Intercommunality: Confluent et Coteaux de Prayssas

Government
  - Mayor (2020–2026): Patrick Jeanney
- Area^{1}: 4.38 km^{2} (1.69 sq mi)
- Elevation: 64 m (210 ft)
- Highest elevation: 175 m (574 ft)
- Lowest elevation: 48 m (157 ft)
- Population (2023): 272
  - Density: 62.1/km^{2} (161/sq mi)
- Time zone: UTC+01:00 (CET)
  - Summer (DST): UTC+02:00 (CEST)
- INSEE/Postal code: 47129 /47190
- ^{1} French Land Register data, which excludes lakes, ponds, glaciers > 1 km^{2} (0.386 sq mi or 247 acres) and river estuaries.

Lagarrigue (French pronunciation: [laɡaʁiɡ]; Occitan: La Garriga) is a commune in the Lot-et-Garonne department in south-western France.

== See also ==
- Communes of the Lot-et-Garonne department
