= Bazens =

- Commune
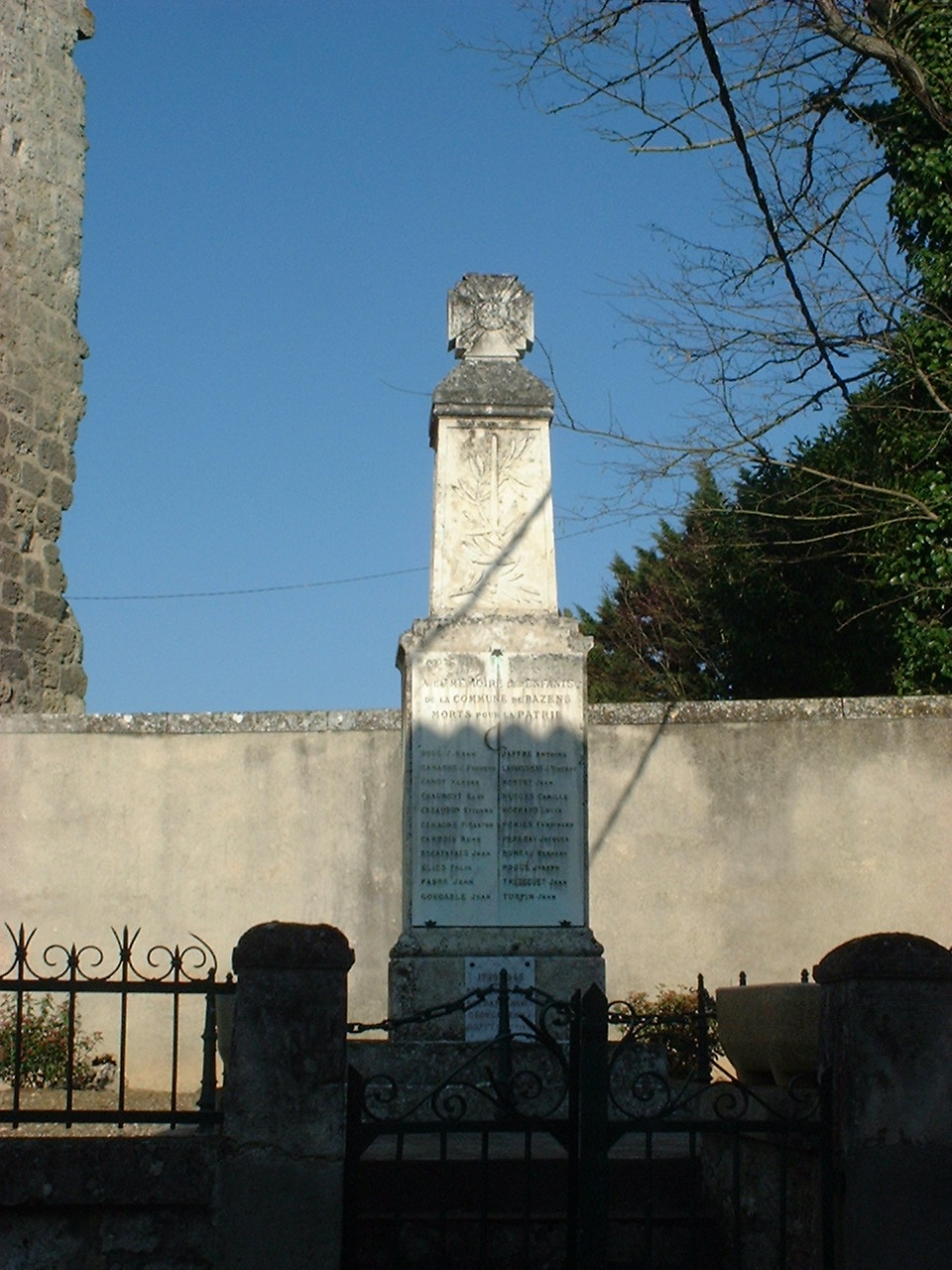
- The war memorial in Bazens

- Coat of arms
- Location of Bazens
- Location within France Location within Nouvelle-Aquitaine
- Coordinates: 44°15′50″N 0°25′24″E
- Country: France
- Region: Nouvelle-Aquitaine
- Department: Lot-et-Garonne
- Arrondissement: Agen
- Canton: Le Confluent

Government
  - Mayor (2020–2026): Francis Castell
- Area^{1}: 12.21 km^{2} (4.71 sq mi)
- Elevation: 150 m (490 ft)
- Highest elevation: 200 m (660 ft)
- Lowest elevation: 30 m (98 ft)
- Population (2023): 494
  - Density: 40.5/km^{2} (105/sq mi)
- Time zone: UTC+01:00 (CET)
  - Summer (DST): UTC+02:00 (CEST)
- INSEE/Postal code: 47022 /47130
- ^{1} French Land Register data, which excludes lakes, ponds, glaciers > 1 km^{2} (0.386 sq mi or 247 acres) and river estuaries.

Bazens is a commune in the Lot-et-Garonne department in southwestern France.

== Population ==
Historical population
Year	Pop.	±% p.a.
1968	333	—
1975	325	−0.35%
1982	372	+1.95%
1990	430	+1.83%
1999	480	+1.23%
2007	515	+0.88%
2012	535	+0.76%
2017	546	+0.41%
2023	494	−1.65%
Source: INSEE

== See also ==
- Communes of the Lot-et-Garonne department
