= Lusignan-Petit =

- Commune
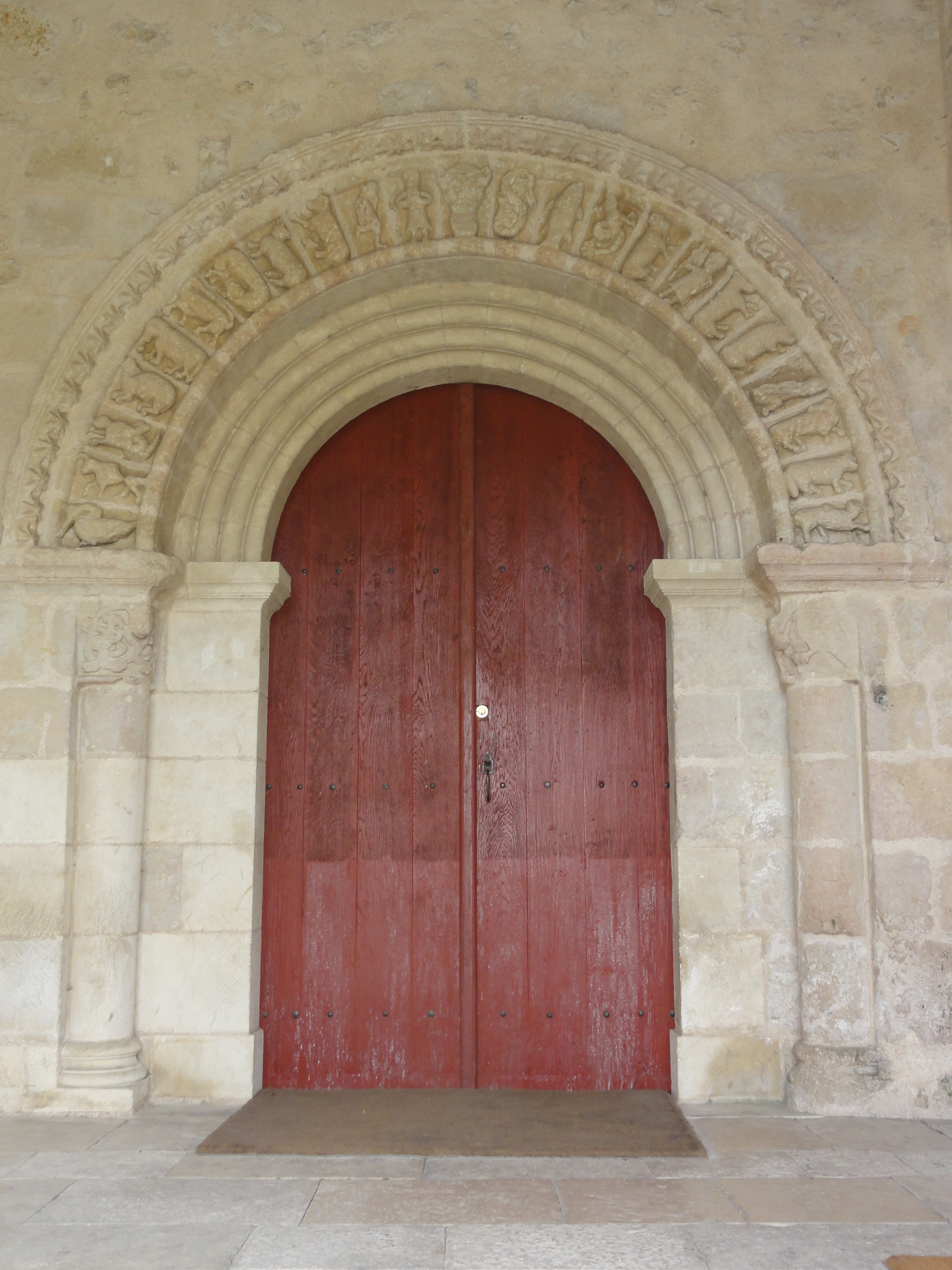
- The door of the church in Lusignan-Petit

- Coat of arms
- Location of Lusignan-Petit
- Location within France Location within Nouvelle-Aquitaine
- Coordinates: 44°16′19″N 0°31′31″E
- Country: France
- Region: Nouvelle-Aquitaine
- Department: Lot-et-Garonne
- Arrondissement: Agen
- Canton: Le Confluent
- Intercommunality: Confluent et Coteaux de Prayssas

Government
  - Mayor (2020–2026): Philippe Lagarde
- Area^{1}: 7.35 km^{2} (2.84 sq mi)
- Elevation: 170 m (560 ft)
- Highest elevation: 198 m (650 ft)
- Lowest elevation: 46 m (151 ft)
- Population (2023): 353
  - Density: 48.0/km^{2} (124/sq mi)
- Time zone: UTC+01:00 (CET)
  - Summer (DST): UTC+02:00 (CEST)
- INSEE/Postal code: 47154 /47360
- ^{1} French Land Register data, which excludes lakes, ponds, glaciers > 1 km^{2} (0.386 sq mi or 247 acres) and river estuaries.

Lusignan-Petit (French pronunciation: [lyziɲɑ̃ pəti]; Occitan: Lusinhan Petit) is a commune in the Lot-et-Garonne department in south-western France. Its inhabitants are called the Lusignanais and Lusignanaises.

== See also ==
- Communes of the Lot-et-Garonne department
