= Madaillan =

- Commune
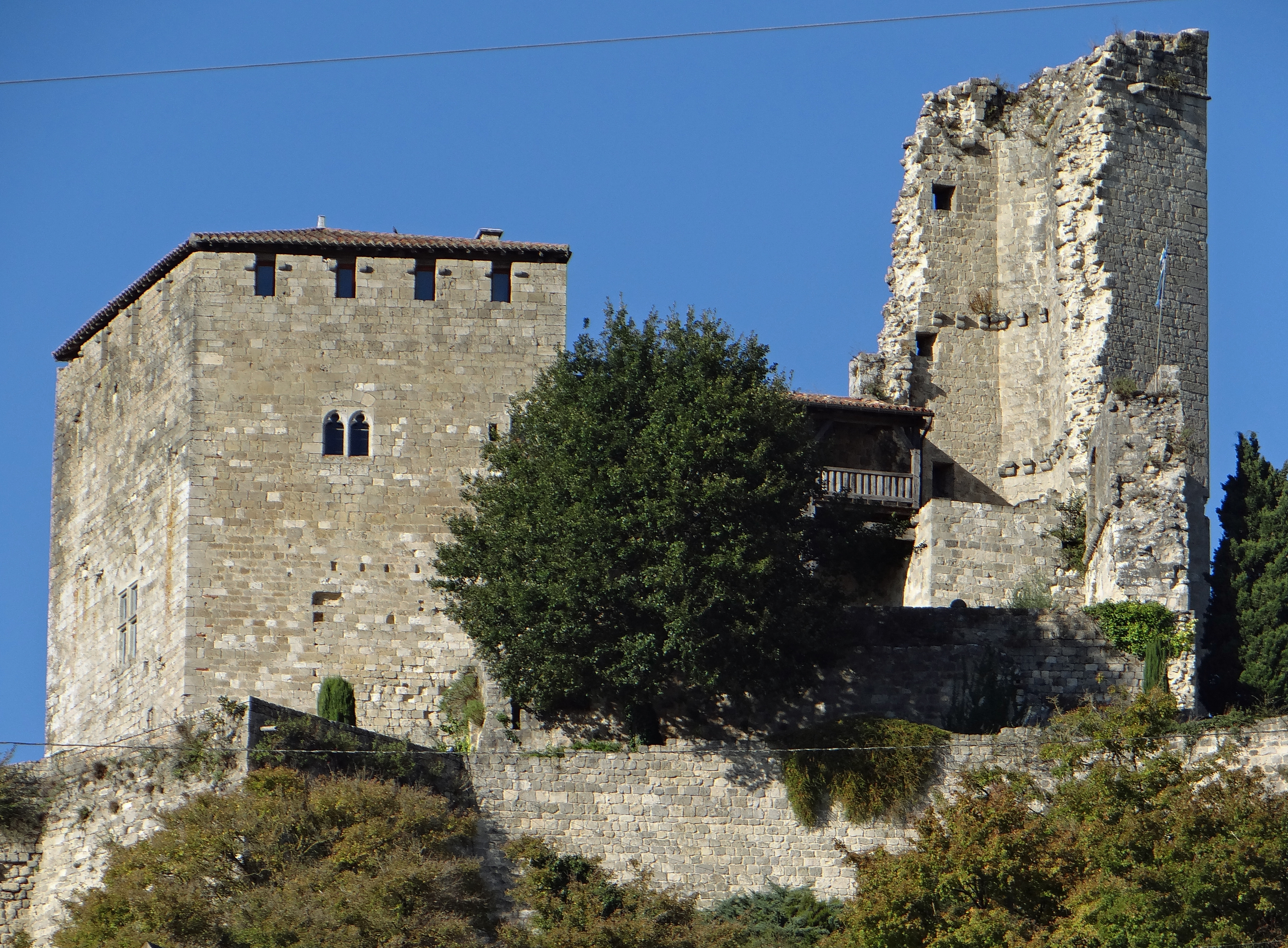
- The Château of Madaillan
- Location of Madaillan
- Location within France Location within Nouvelle-Aquitaine
- Coordinates: 44°16′40″N 0°34′29″E
- Country: France
- Region: Nouvelle-Aquitaine
- Department: Lot-et-Garonne
- Arrondissement: Agen
- Canton: Le Confluent
- Intercommunality: Confluent et Coteaux de Prayssas

Government
  - Mayor (2020–2026): Philippe Darquiès
- Area^{1}: 24.39 km^{2} (9.42 sq mi)
- Elevation: 158 m (518 ft)
- Highest elevation: 225 m (738 ft)
- Lowest elevation: 61 m (200 ft)
- Population (2023): 648
  - Density: 26.6/km^{2} (68.8/sq mi)
- Time zone: UTC+01:00 (CET)
  - Summer (DST): UTC+02:00 (CEST)
- INSEE/Postal code: 47155 /47360
- ^{1} French Land Register data, which excludes lakes, ponds, glaciers > 1 km^{2} (0.386 sq mi or 247 acres) and river estuaries.

Madaillan (French pronunciation: [madajɑ̃]; Occitan: Madalhan) is a commune in the Lot-et-Garonne department in south-western France.

== See also ==
- Communes of the Lot-et-Garonne department
