= Montpezat, Lot-et-Garonne =

Montpezat
- Commune
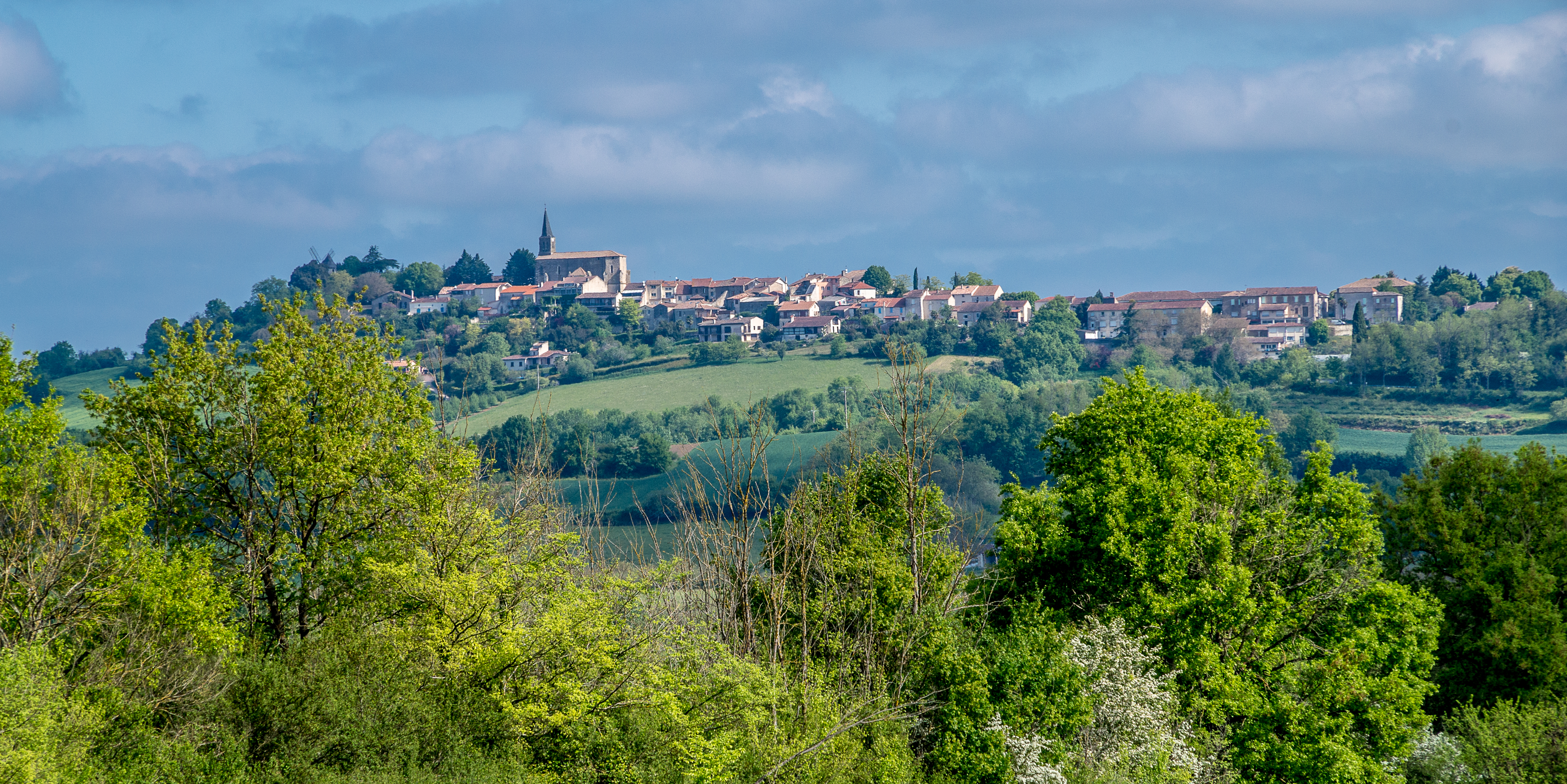
- A general view of Montpezat

- Coat of arms
- Location of Montpezat
- Location within France Location within Nouvelle-Aquitaine
- Coordinates: 44°20′51″N 0°31′29″E
- Country: France
- Region: Nouvelle-Aquitaine
- Department: Lot-et-Garonne
- Arrondissement: Agen
- Canton: Le Confluent
- Intercommunality: Confluent et Coteaux de Prayssas

Government
  - Mayor (2020–2026): Jacqueline Seignouret
- Area^{1}: 24.19 km^{2} (9.34 sq mi)
- Elevation: 180 m (590 ft)
- Highest elevation: 200 m (660 ft)
- Lowest elevation: 37 m (121 ft)
- Population (2023): 566
  - Density: 23.4/km^{2} (60.6/sq mi)
- Time zone: UTC+01:00 (CET)
  - Summer (DST): UTC+02:00 (CEST)
- INSEE/Postal code: 47190 /47360
- ^{1} French Land Register data, which excludes lakes, ponds, glaciers > 1 km^{2} (0.386 sq mi or 247 acres) and river estuaries.

Montpezat (French pronunciation: [mɔ̃pəza]; Occitan: Montpesat) is a commune in the Lot-et-Garonne department in south-western France.

== See also ==
- Communes of the Lot-et-Garonne department
