= Lamontjoie =

- Commune
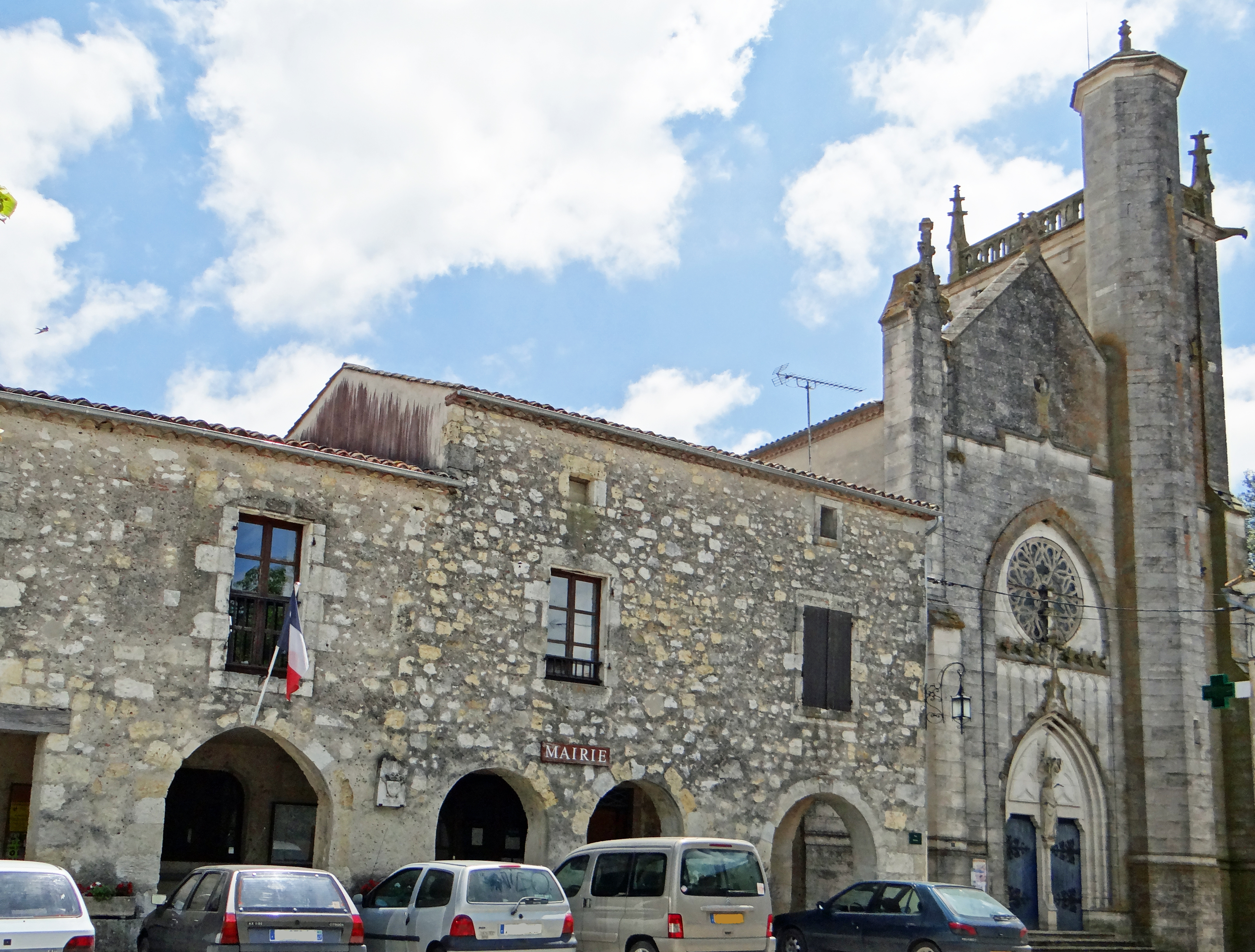
- The town hall and church in Lamontjoie
- Location of Lamontjoie
- Location within France Location within Nouvelle-Aquitaine
- Coordinates: 44°04′34″N 0°31′18″E
- Country: France
- Region: Nouvelle-Aquitaine
- Department: Lot-et-Garonne
- Arrondissement: Nérac
- Canton: L'Albret

Government
  - Mayor (2020–2026): Pascal Boutan
- Area^{1}: 17.75 km^{2} (6.85 sq mi)
- Elevation: 120 m (390 ft)
- Highest elevation: 201 m (659 ft)
- Lowest elevation: 87 m (285 ft)
- Population (2023): 553
  - Density: 31.2/km^{2} (80.7/sq mi)
- Time zone: UTC+01:00 (CET)
  - Summer (DST): UTC+02:00 (CEST)
- INSEE/Postal code: 47133 /47310
- ^{1} French Land Register data, which excludes lakes, ponds, glaciers > 1 km^{2} (0.386 sq mi or 247 acres) and river estuaries.

Lamontjoie (French pronunciation: [lamɔ̃ʒwa]；Occitan: La Montjòia) is a commune in the Lot-et-Garonne department in south-western France.

== See also ==
- Communes of the Lot-et-Garonne department
