= Montagnac-sur-Auvignon =

- Commune
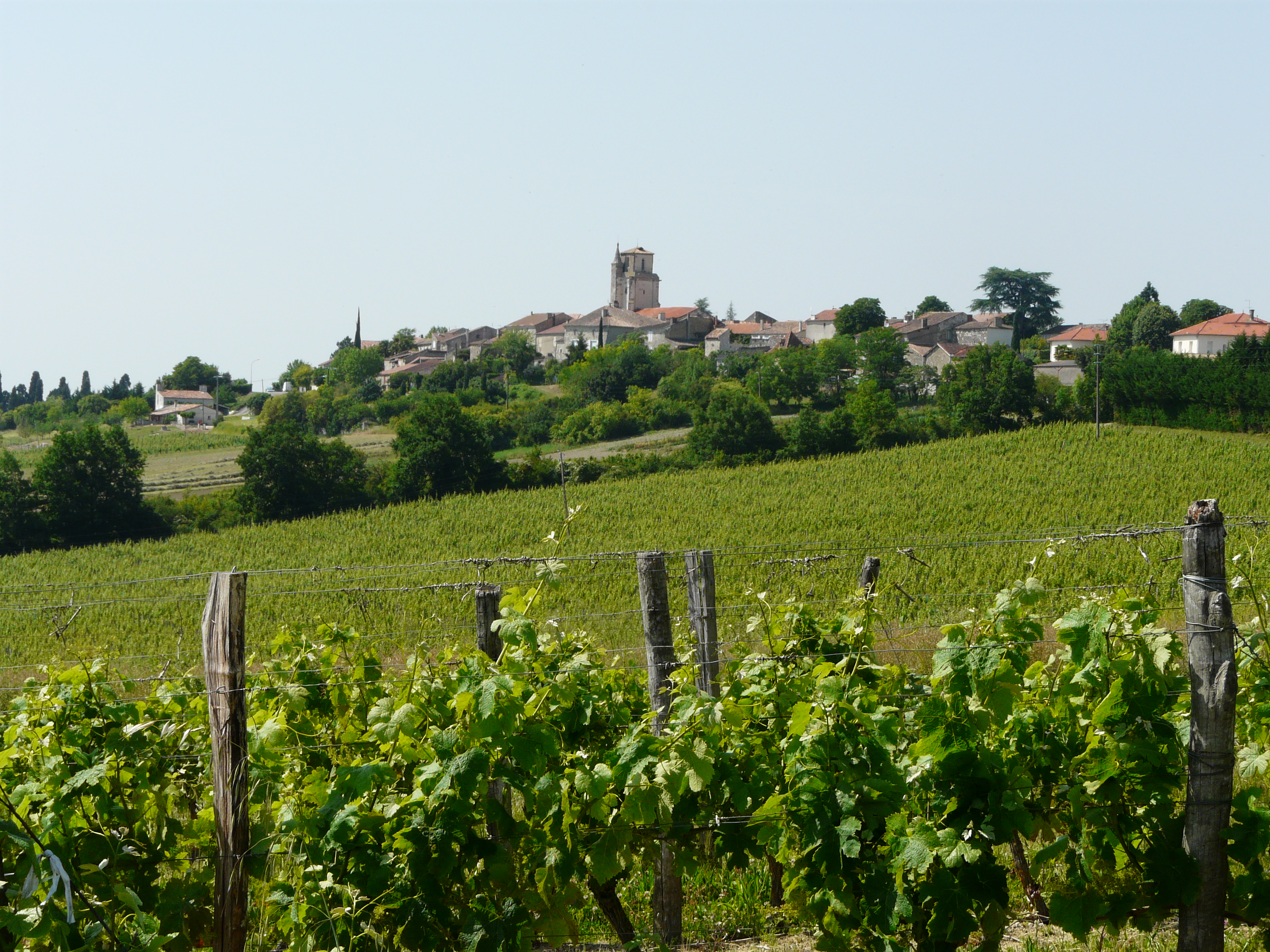
- A general view of Montagnac-sur-Auvignon
- Location of Montagnac-sur-Auvignon
- Location within France Location within Nouvelle-Aquitaine
- Coordinates: 44°09′42″N 0°27′38″E
- Country: France
- Region: Nouvelle-Aquitaine
- Department: Lot-et-Garonne
- Arrondissement: Nérac
- Canton: L'Albret
- Intercommunality: Albret Communauté

Government
  - Mayor (2020–2026): Jean-Louis Tolot
- Area^{1}: 22.69 km^{2} (8.76 sq mi)
- Elevation: 196 m (643 ft)
- Highest elevation: 196 m (643 ft)
- Lowest elevation: 48 m (157 ft)
- Population (2023): 641
  - Density: 28.3/km^{2} (73.2/sq mi)
- Time zone: UTC+01:00 (CET)
  - Summer (DST): UTC+02:00 (CEST)
- INSEE/Postal code: 47180 /47600
- Website: Media:http://www.albret-tourisme.com/uploads/photos/180.jpg
- ^{1} French Land Register data, which excludes lakes, ponds, glaciers > 1 km^{2} (0.386 sq mi or 247 acres) and river estuaries.

Montagnac-sur-Auvignon (French pronunciation: [mɔ̃taɲak syʁ oviɲɔ̃]; Occitan: Montanhac d'Auvinhon) is a commune in the Lot-et-Garonne department in south-western France.

The commune is about 17 km south west of Agen and a similar distance east of Barbaste.

== See also ==
- Communes of the Lot-et-Garonne department
