= Vianne =

- Commune
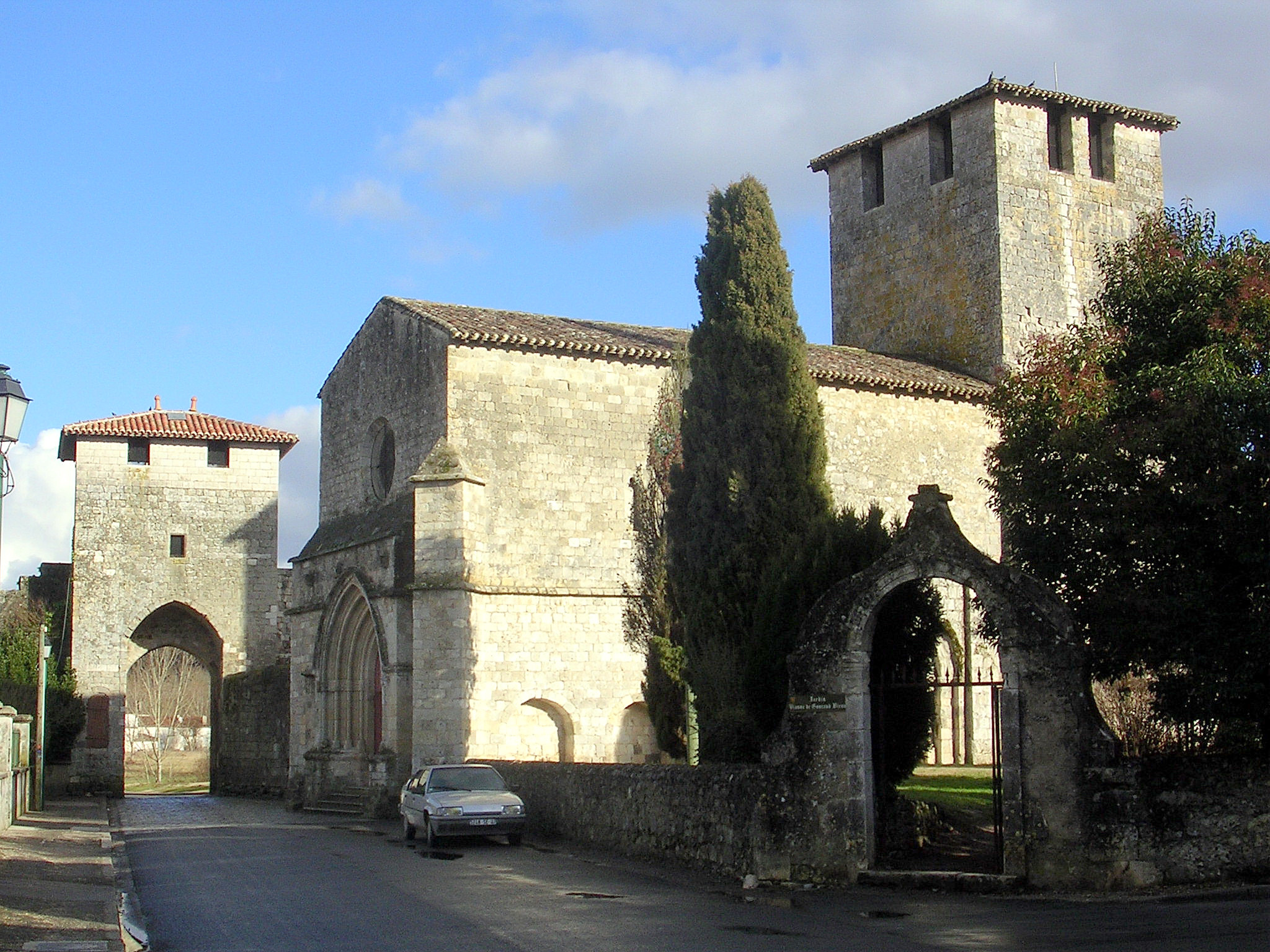
- The church in Vianne

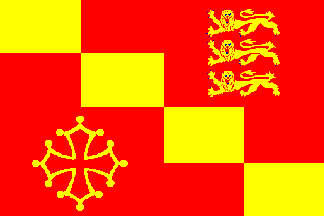
- Flag Coat of arms
- Location of Vianne
- Location within France Location within Nouvelle-Aquitaine
- Coordinates: 44°11′52″N 0°19′18″E
- Country: France
- Region: Nouvelle-Aquitaine
- Department: Lot-et-Garonne
- Arrondissement: Nérac
- Canton: Lavardac
- Intercommunality: Albret Communauté

Government
  - Mayor (2020–2026): Laurence Tonin Benlloch
- Area^{1}: 9.82 km^{2} (3.79 sq mi)
- Elevation: 42 m (138 ft)
- Highest elevation: 134 m (440 ft)
- Lowest elevation: 28 m (92 ft)
- Population (2023): 979
  - Density: 99.7/km^{2} (258/sq mi)
- Time zone: UTC+01:00 (CET)
  - Summer (DST): UTC+02:00 (CEST)
- INSEE/Postal code: 47318 /47230
- ^{1} French Land Register data, which excludes lakes, ponds, glaciers > 1 km^{2} (0.386 sq mi or 247 acres) and river estuaries.

Vianne (French pronunciation: [vjan]; Gascon: Viana) is a commune in the Lot-et-Garonne department in southwestern France.

== History ==
The territories of Aquitania and Gascony were highly desirable lands and in order to protect and also control the people living there a series of fortified villages, “bastides” were founded from about 1229. Where Vianne now lies already existed a village, Vilalonga, with a mill and a dam on the river Baïse. The village also had a church from the 12th century.

The nearby village of Montgaillard was the seat of the Gontaud Birons, the local feudal lords. The village of Vilalonga belonged to Vianne of Gontaud Biron or Vianne of Gontaut Biron, one of the two daughters of Vital, lord of Montgaillard. On the death of her father Vianne had inherited the castle and its dependencies (including Vilalonga), the castle of Puch and the one of Gontaud. Vianne had a sad life, was married twice without producing any children and in 1281 in a convents she had founded in Condom she would die. However, in 1275 she had bequeathed all her properties to her nephew Jourdain de l'Isle. He had pledged his allegiance to Edward I, son of Eleanor of Provence who became king of England in 1272. To continue the policy of fortifying the area it was decided in 1284 to construct a bastide on the lands at Vilalonga and it was named after Vianne de Gontaud Biron.

The 13th century was a costly time for the local lords. They were expected to provide soldiers for the English monarchy and its overseas wars and also enjoy a lavish lifestyle. Thus it was seen that part of the decision to construct these bastide villages was economic as well as with security in mind. In feudalism, the local population swore loyalty to a lord. These locals paid taxes (tithes) out of whatever they could produce and sell. A lord kept law and order: police, judge and jury all in one, enforced by his army. Farmers didn't make a lot of money, and mostly grew grain and raised enough cattle to live on, with only a little left over. Lords needed another way to finance their lavish lifestyles and the crusades, plus whatever demands the church also made for financial support. Thus the lords needed a way to generate more money than the tithe system could produce.

The bastide was devised to solve this problem. The idea was to clear some land, build a fortified village and attract the local population to live there and work the expanse of land around it. This was often done by an agreement known as a “pareatge”, a legal contract between two or more parties agreeing to develop the bastide for their mutual benefit. Frequently the pareage was between the local lord, in this case Jourdain de l'Isle and a sovereign power, Edward 1 of England. The agreement set out the responsibilities of each party to the villagers and also what share of the profits from the markets and land taxes, etc. would go to each party. If the correct population density could be achieved (the hopeful part), this would attract merchants to the markets, who could also be taxed. The incentive for people to live in a bastide was release from direct taxation by the lord. Those who moved to a bastide became free men yet still enjoyed the protection of the lord's army. This was the beginning of the end of feudalism. The lord and the king could now make money through property taxes on those living in the bastide, and also sales taxes on the markets that took place there.

The market was the centre of the village because it generated sales taxes. This is also why churches in bastides are normally located away from the centre; churches didn't generate revenue. The bastide was laid out on a grid because that made assessing property taxes easier and more equitable. The laws of the bastide said that trade could only take place in the market square, and the purpose of the covered central area was to protect the weighing and measuring devices of the lord's representative and tax collector.

Started in 1284 and finished in 1287 Vianne is one of the most interesting bastides because of its formal plan and its well-preserved walls and gates. Its maps show building plots which were originally equal in size, i.e. about 11.70 metres in front by 23.40 metres at the sides (24 rasas by 48, the “rasa” being a medieval unit of measure). Over an inside area of about 10 hectares, only part of the land was allotted to the first inhabitants and the space in the village was far from being wholly occupied by housing. The gardens have at all times taken up a lot of space. The overall structure included two road axes: one, north–south nearly 350 metres long, ran parallel with the Baïse, the other, about 250 metres long, lies perpendicular to the first. Other streets of different widths ran parallel to each of these but none of them led to a village gate. So it can be seen that there were only four entrances. These main streets are 7.68 metres wide. The narrower streets were half as wide. Five round towers (defensive) and four square towers (exits and entrances) marked the 1250 metres of outside walls.

The original walls were first built approximately four to five blocks of limestone high continuously around the village before the next level of four blocks was added and so on to reach the optimum height of between six and eight metres. However following renovation work most of the walls are only between four and five metres high. In some places the maximum height of six to eight metre walls can still be seen. All the blocks are between 20 and 28 cm in height and 25 to 45 cm in length. A rampart walk still exists in some place at about 3.5m above ground level. There are some arrow slits visible in the walls on the river side of the village.

Today most of the buildings in the village date from the 19th and 20th centuries although a few exist from the 17th and 18th. The outside walls were extensively restored in the late 19th and early 20th centuries. One of the towers on the river Baïse side of the village has been removed and most of that wall replaced by houses. The towers originally were capped with wooden turrets and these have been replaced with stone. When the suspension bridge was built in the 1840s new entrances were made in the walls to allow for traffic through the village. At the northeast end of the village the road now bends to meet the bridge over the Baïse.

Jourdain de l'Isle was not a popular lord. He was known to be a vicious soldier and very cruel to his local population. In 1313, he destroyed the church in Vianne after a row with the monks. He was executed in 1323 on the orders of then King, Edward III.

During the Hundred Years' War, the French retook Vianne from the English in 1337. It was then retaken in 1340 by the English who again surrendered it to the French in 1342. Again retaken by the English it changed hands several times over the next hundred years before it was finally relinquished to the French crown in 1442.

Today Vianne is well known for the glassmaking industry which developed over many years. A large factory was built outside the walls at the south-western end in the 1920s and this has gone through many changes. The old railway station is the workshop for a glass blowing craftsman and other craftspeople work in the village, e.g. a leather worker, a furniture restorer and a potter. The railway line now only handles freight traffic between Port-Sainte-Marie and Nérac. The River Baïse is well used by passenger boats, both private or from the bases at Le-Mas-d'Agenais, Buzet-sur-Baïse and Condom. The Albret valley, a tourist area with Nérac as its capital, is crossed by the Tenarèze - an ancient Roman road - and boasts a fortified mill, castles dating from the 13th, 14th and 17th centuries, other bastides and Romanesque churches scattered over hilly countryside partly covered by the Buzet vineyards. Vianne has fine restaurants and small shops and is a popular tourist stopover particularly in the summer with its evening market.

Vianne is referenced in the novel Vianne, by British author Joanne Harris, and is the name of her protagonist, Vianne Rocher, who also features in her 1999 novel, Chocolat.

== See also ==
- Communes of the Lot-et-Garonne department
