= Château de Lagrange-Monrepos =

Castle in Nouvelle-Aquitaine, France

- Nérac, Lot-et-Garonne in France

Site information
- Type: Castle
- Owner: Private

Location
- Coordinates: 44°09′29″N 0°19′16″E

Site history
- Built: 16-17th century

The Château de Lagrange-Monrepos was originally a medieval castle in the commune of Nérac in the Lot-et-Garonne département of France, controlling the valley of the Baïse

== History ==
During the Renaissance, the installation of the court of Navarre in Nérac resulted in the construction or renovation of rich homes for the entourage of the Albret family. Thus, around 1550, the Château de Lagrange-Monrepos would have been built or renovated by Henry I of Albret (Henry II of Navarre) and, according to tradition, offered to his mistress, Marianne Alespée.

== Architecture ==
The military aspect of the building is characterised by the six towers that rise around the house. The loopholes in the corner towers of the courtyard were kept to facilitate the use of firearms at the time of the French Wars of Religion. Large crosses in stone with moulded frames and pediments open onto the courtyard and towards the Baïse.

== Protection ==
The château is privately owned and not open to the public. It has been listed since 1990 as a monument historique by the French Ministry of Culture and classified since 1991. The castle, the entrance staircase, its round tower and the fountain are classified as well as the outbuildings, the towers and the walls, as well as the dovecote and its mechanism.

== See also ==
- List of castles in France

== Bibliography ==
- Philippe Lauzun, "Le château de Lagrange-Monrepos", Revue de l'Agenais, 1901, vol 28, pp. 381–402 (in French)
- Jean Burias, Guide des châteaux de France : Lot-et-Garonne, p. 57, Hermé, Paris, 1985 ISBN 978-2-86665-009-4 (in French)
