= Feugarolles =

- Commune
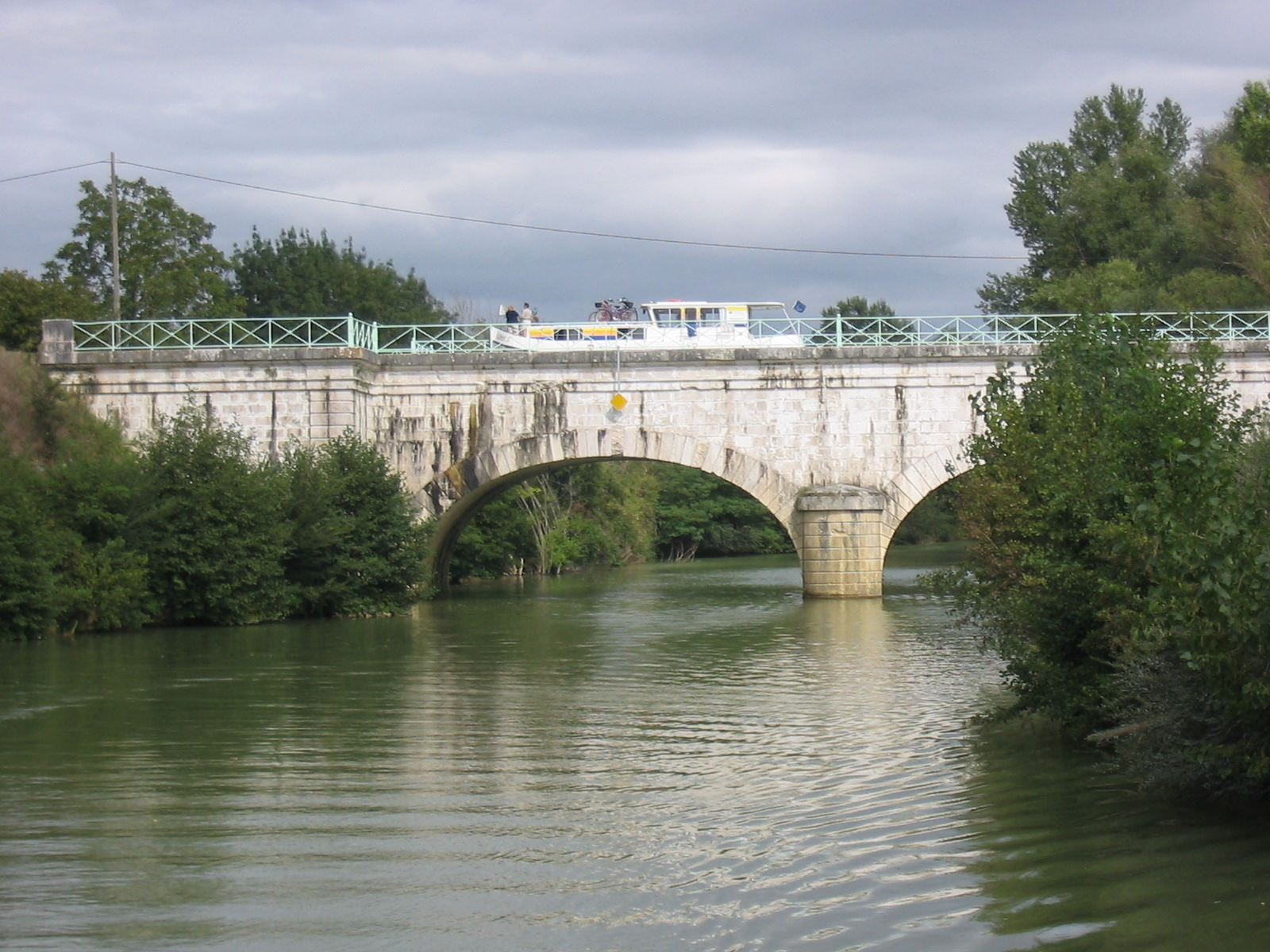
- The canal aqueduct over the Baïse river
- Location of Feugarolles
- Location within France Location within Nouvelle-Aquitaine
- Coordinates: 44°13′20″N 0°20′52″E
- Country: France
- Region: Nouvelle-Aquitaine
- Department: Lot-et-Garonne
- Arrondissement: Nérac
- Canton: Lavardac
- Intercommunality: Albret Communauté

Government
  - Mayor (2020–2026): Jean-François Garrabos
- Area^{1}: 23.82 km^{2} (9.20 sq mi)
- Elevation: 80 m (260 ft)
- Highest elevation: 172 m (564 ft)
- Lowest elevation: 27 m (89 ft)
- Population (2023): 1,015
  - Density: 42.61/km^{2} (110.4/sq mi)
- Time zone: UTC+01:00 (CET)
  - Summer (DST): UTC+02:00 (CEST)
- INSEE/Postal code: 47097 /47230
- ^{1} French Land Register data, which excludes lakes, ponds, glaciers > 1 km^{2} (0.386 sq mi or 247 acres) and river estuaries.

Feugarolles (French pronunciation: [føɡaʁɔl]; Occitan: Huugaròlas) is a commune in the Lot-et-Garonne department in south-western France.

== Notable people ==
Feugarolles was the birthplace of:

- Adèle de Batz de Trenquelléon (1789-1828), foundress of the Daughters of Mary Immaculate, in 1816, in Agen

== See also ==
- Communes of the Lot-et-Garonne department
