= Achille Giroux =

French painter

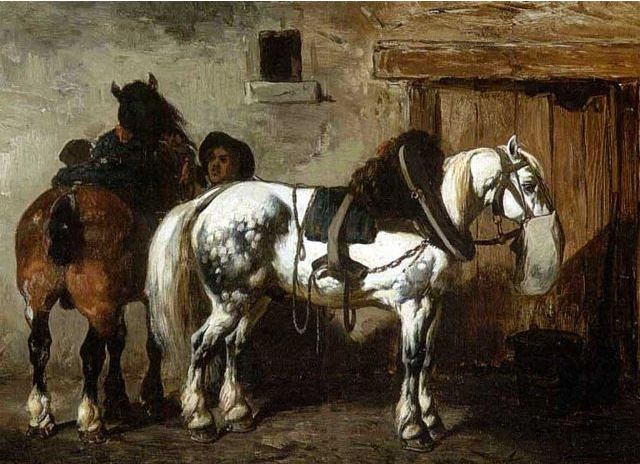
- Stable Boy with Two Horses
- Born: 13 May 1816; Mortagne-au-Perche
- Died: 26 March 1854 (aged 37); Saint-Léon
- Education: École de cavalerie, Saumur
- Occupation: Painter

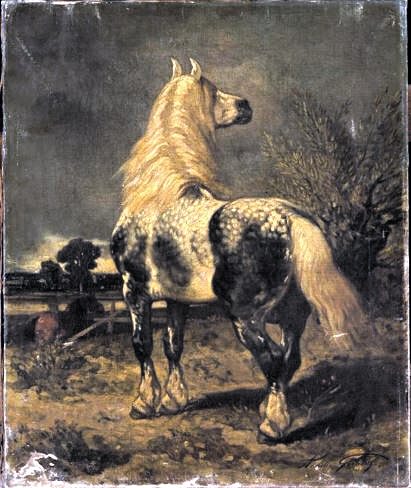
Percheron in a Landscape

Jean François Achille Giroux (13 May 1816, Mortagne-au-Perche - 26 March 1854, Saint-Léon) was a French painter and lithographer in the Realist style. Most of his works feature animals; primarily horses.

== Biography ==
His father, Étienne Jean Giroux, was a wigmaker and his mother, Marie-Louise Maillard came from a family of bakers. After his primary education in Alençon, he attended the Saumur Cavalry School. It was there that he received his first drawing lessons, combined with some elements of lithography. Eventually, his parents allowed him to go to Paris to pursue his interests.

There, he became a student of Michel Martin Drolling. Although human models were presented to him, his most enthusiastically produced drawings continued to involve horses. He also became more adept at lithography; to the point that, despite his youth, a major publisher, Victor Delarue (fl.1835-1870), hired him to create illustrations for a course on equine anatomy. In pursuit of this, he would make daily visits to the École nationale vétérinaire d'Alfort to study and make sketches of the dissected horses there. With the proceeds from this contract, he made a tour of France. While travelling in Normandy, he paid a visit to the Haras national du Pin, France's oldest stud farm. He would return there throughout his short life for inspiration.

His first exhibition at the Salon came in 1840. By 1843, he was presenting several works at each session and was attracting customers from England as well as rural France. Nevertheless, he was not financially successful and remained in debt.

His troubles truly began when creditors came to seize his belongings and took a writing desk, said to have belonged to Margaret of Parma, that had been left in his safekeeping by a neighbor who had been expecting a similar seizure. Some of his sketches were overlooked and were collected by his friend, Eugène Isabey, who sold them at auction and was able to take in twenty Louis d'or to help him pay his debts. After this, Giroux went to stay at the artists' colony in Barbizon.

That was only the beginning, however. The next time his troubles came in the form of a publisher who contracted with him for an album of equestrian scenes that required eight to ten months of work, with the promise of a 4,000 Franc advance. The advance was never paid, he received no royalties and the would-be publisher disappeared. A few months later, he learned of the publisher's bankruptcy. Not long after, he was visited by court officials who presented him with a note for 4,000 Francs, which he had supposedly initialed, and was now forced to pay, plus interest and fees, or he would be taken to prison. He sold what paintings he could, drew on charity or loans from his friends and was able to pay off the principal, but his total indebtedness eventually rose to 12,000 Francs and he was under the constant threat of imprisonment.

This continual struggle exhausted him and he became unable to paint. In 1854, the writer and journalist, Alfred de Menciaux, offered him the hospitality of his home in Lot-et-Garonne. Shortly after arriving there, Giroux died.
