= Arrondissement of Nérac =

Coordinates: 44°08′N 0°20′E

Nérac
- Arrondissement
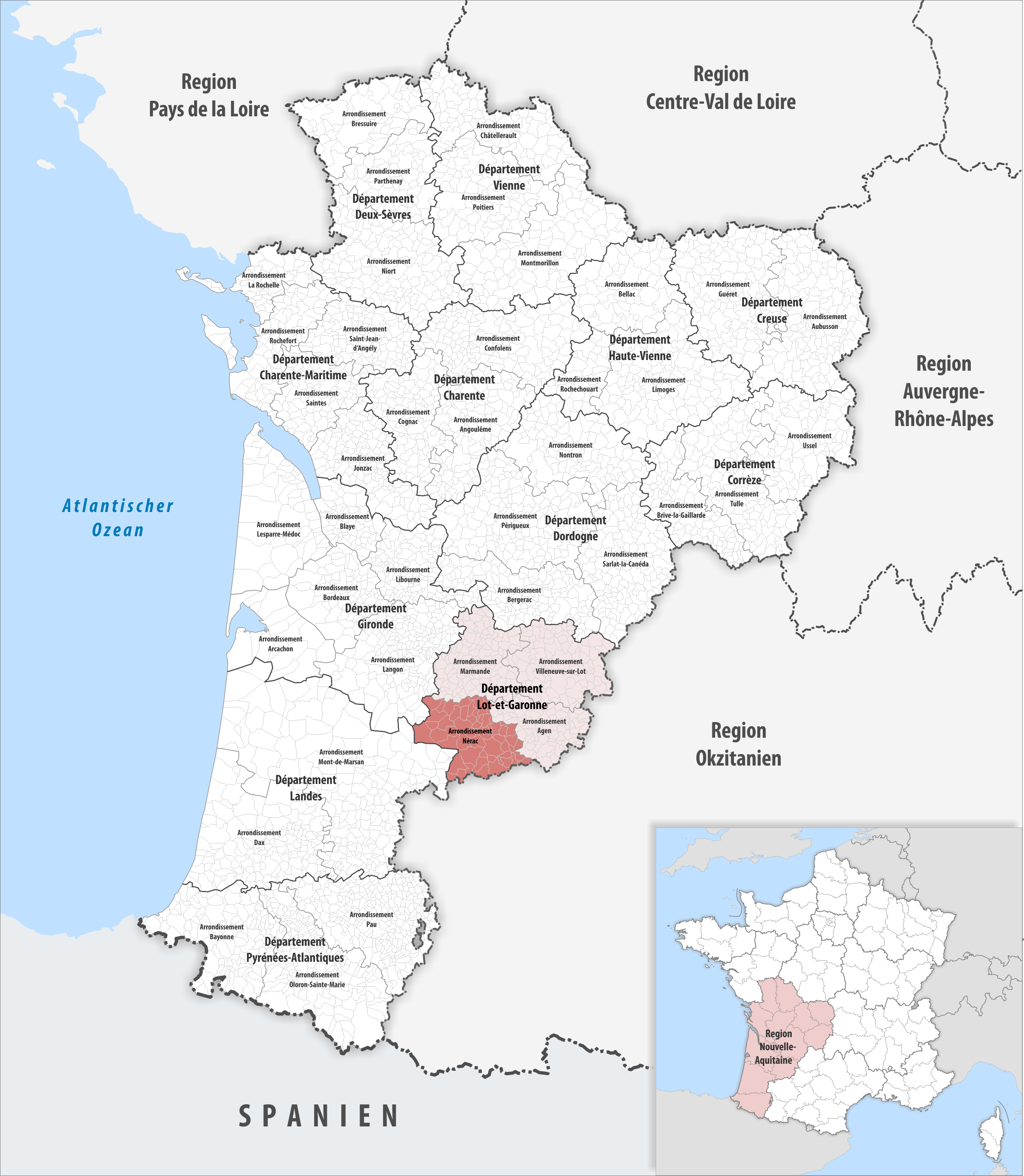
- Location within the region Nouvelle-Aquitaine
- Country: France
- Region: Nouvelle-Aquitaine
- Department: Lot-et-Garonne
- No. of communes: {{{nbcomm}}}
- Area: 1,400.3 km^{2} (540.7 sq mi)
- Population (2023): 38,689
  - Density: 27.629/km^{2} (71.559/sq mi)
- INSEE code: 474

The arrondissement of Nérac is an arrondissement of France in the Lot-et-Garonne department in the Nouvelle-Aquitaine region. It has 58 communes. Its population is 38,342 (2021), and its area is 1,400.3 km^{2} (540.7 sq mi).

== Composition ==
The communes of the arrondissement of Nérac, and their INSEE codes, are:

1. Allons, Lot-et-Garonne (47007)
2. Ambrus (47008)
3. Andiran (47009)
4. Anzex (47012)
5. Barbaste (47021)
6. Beauziac (47026)
7. Boussès (47039)
8. Bruch (47041)
9. Buzet-sur-Baïse (47043)
10. Calignac (47045)
11. Casteljaloux (47052)
12. Caubeyres (47058)
13. Damazan (47078)
14. Durance (47085)
15. Espiens (47090)
16. Fargues-sur-Ourbise (47093)
17. Feugarolles (47097)
18. Fieux (47098)
19. Francescas (47102)
20. Fréchou (47103)
21. Houeillès (47119)
22. Lamontjoie (47133)
23. Lannes (47134)
24. Lasserre (47139)
25. Lavardac (47143)
26. Leyritz-Moncassin (47148)
27. Mézin (47167)
28. Moncaut (47172)
29. Moncrabeau (47174)
30. Monheurt (47177)
31. Montagnac-sur-Auvignon (47180)
32. Montesquieu (47186)
33. Montgaillard-en-Albret (47176)
34. Nérac (47195)
35. Nomdieu (47197)
36. Pindères (47205)
37. Pompiey (47207)
38. Pompogne (47208)
39. Poudenas (47211)
40. Puch-d'Agenais (47214)
41. Razimet (47220)
42. Réaup-Lisse (47221)
43. La Réunion (47222)
44. Sainte-Maure-de-Peyriac (47258)
45. Saint-Laurent (47249)
46. Saint-Léger (47250)
47. Saint-Léon (47251)
48. Saint-Martin-Curton (47254)
49. Saint-Pé-Saint-Simon (47266)
50. Saint-Pierre-de-Buzet (47267)
51. Saint-Vincent-de-Lamontjoie (47282)
52. Sauméjan (47286)
53. Saumont (47287)
54. Sos (47302)
55. Thouars-sur-Garonne (47308)
56. Vianne (47318)
57. Villefranche-du-Queyran (47320)
58. Xaintrailles (47327)

== History ==
The arrondissement of Nérac was created in 1800, disbanded in 1926 and restored in 1942.

As a result of the reorganisation of the cantons of France which came into effect in 2015, the borders of the cantons are no longer related to the borders of the arrondissements. The cantons of the arrondissement of Nérac were, as of January 2015:

1. Casteljaloux
2. Damazan
3. Francescas
4. Houeillès
5. Lavardac
6. Mézin
7. Nérac
