= Saint-Pierre-de-Buzet =

- Commune
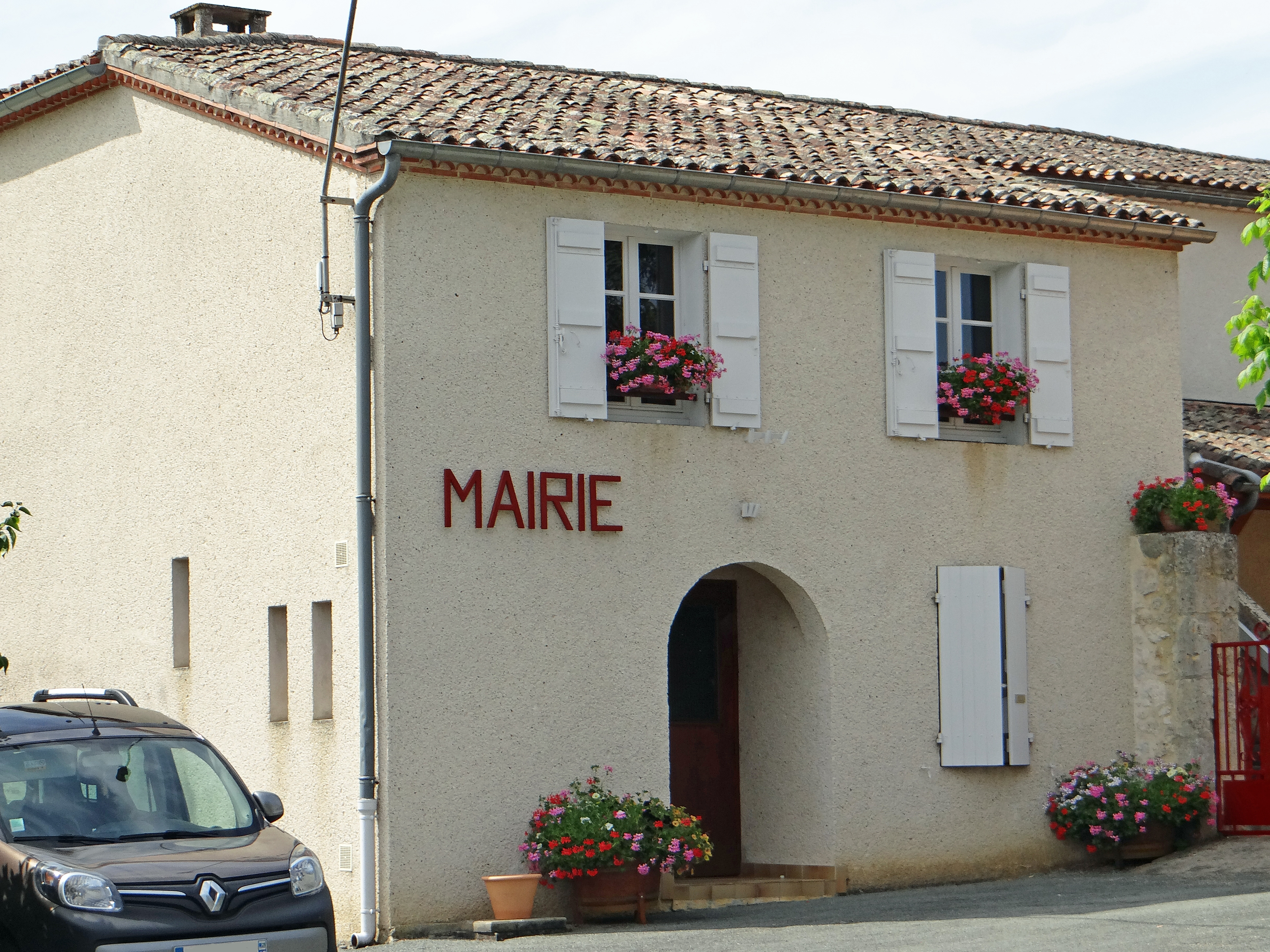
- The town hall in Saint-Pierre-de-Buzet
- Location of Saint-Pierre-de-Buzet
- Location within France Location within Nouvelle-Aquitaine
- Coordinates: 44°15′18″N 0°16′28″E
- Country: France
- Region: Nouvelle-Aquitaine
- Department: Lot-et-Garonne
- Arrondissement: Nérac
- Canton: Lavardac

Government
  - Mayor (2020–2026): Patrick Yon
- Area^{1}: 8.52 km^{2} (3.29 sq mi)
- Elevation: 70 m (230 ft)
- Highest elevation: 160 m (520 ft)
- Lowest elevation: 32 m (105 ft)
- Population (2023): 274
  - Density: 32.2/km^{2} (83.3/sq mi)
- Time zone: UTC+01:00 (CET)
  - Summer (DST): UTC+02:00 (CEST)
- INSEE/Postal code: 47267 /47160
- ^{1} French Land Register data, which excludes lakes, ponds, glaciers > 1 km^{2} (0.386 sq mi or 247 acres) and river estuaries.

Saint-Pierre-de-Buzet (French pronunciation: [sɛ̃ pjɛʁ də byzɛ], literally Saint-Pierre of Buzet; Gascon: Sent Per de Busèth) is a commune in the Lot-et-Garonne department in south-western France.

== See also ==
- Communes of the Lot-et-Garonne department
