= Montesquieu (disambiguation) =

Montesquieu (1689–1755) was a French lawyer, man of letters, and political philosopher.

Montesquieu may also refer to:

- Montesquieu, Hérault, commune in the Hérault department, France
- Montesquieu, Lot-et-Garonne, commune in the Lot-et-Garonne department, France
- Montesquieu, Tarn-et-Garonne, commune in the Tarn-et-Garonne department, France
