= Saint-Laurent, Lot-et-Garonne =

Saint-Laurent
- Commune
- Location of Saint-Laurent
- Location within France Location within Nouvelle-Aquitaine
- Coordinates: 44°14′52″N 0°24′03″E
- Country: France
- Region: Nouvelle-Aquitaine
- Department: Lot-et-Garonne
- Arrondissement: Nérac
- Canton: Lavardac

Government
  - Mayor (2024–2026): Guy Clua
- Area^{1}: 4.4 km^{2} (1.7 sq mi)
- Elevation: 31 m (102 ft)
- Highest elevation: 40 m (130 ft)
- Lowest elevation: 30 m (98 ft)
- Population (2023): 431
  - Density: 98/km^{2} (250/sq mi)
- Time zone: UTC+01:00 (CET)
  - Summer (DST): UTC+02:00 (CEST)
- INSEE/Postal code: 47249 /47130
- ^{1} French Land Register data, which excludes lakes, ponds, glaciers > 1 km^{2} (0.386 sq mi or 247 acres) and river estuaries.

Saint-Laurent (French pronunciation: [sɛ̃ loʁɑ̃]; Occitan: Sent Laurenç) is a commune in the Lot-et-Garonne department in south-western France.

== See also ==
- Communes of the Lot-et-Garonne department
