= Barbaste =

- Commune
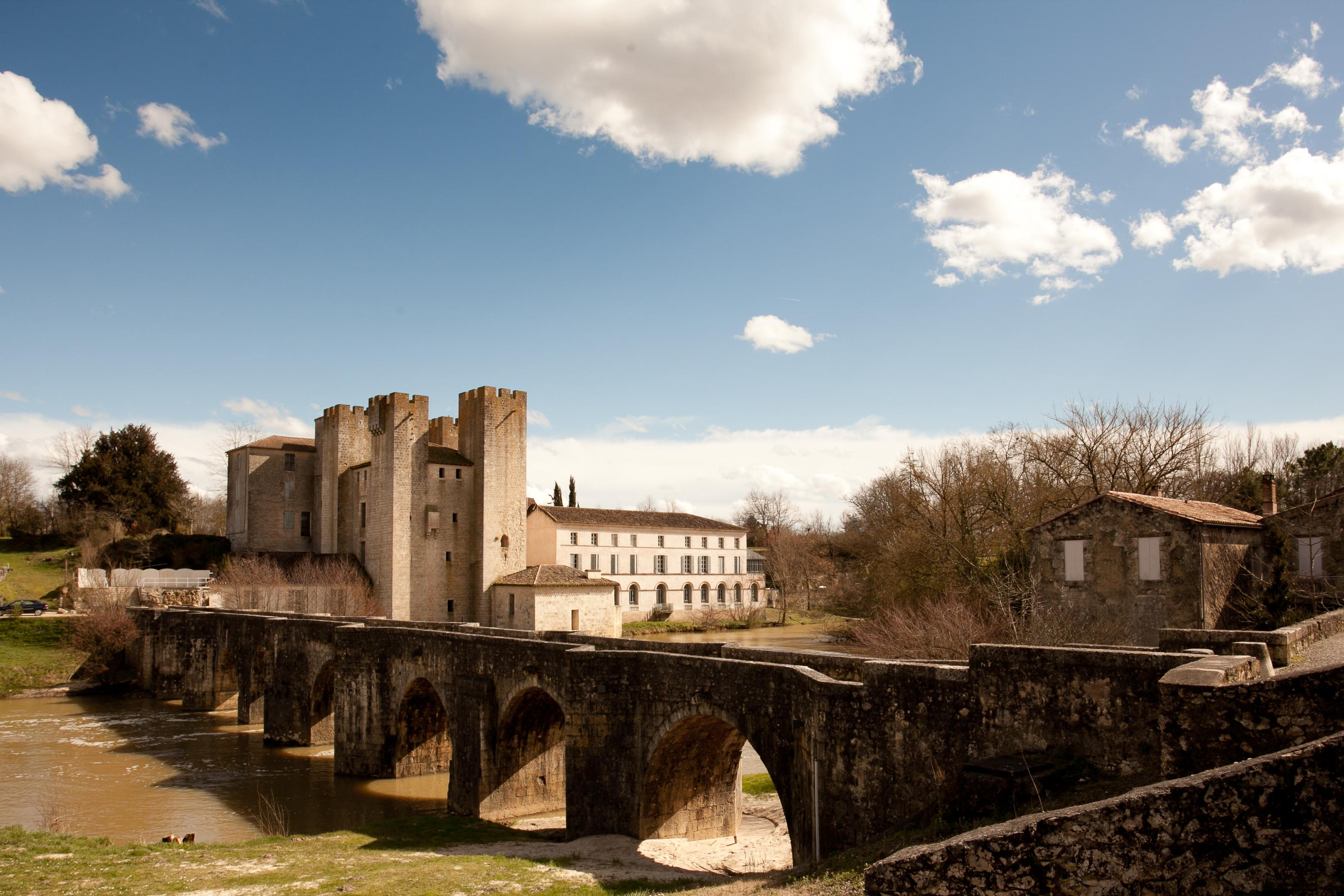
- The bridge and the fortified mill in Barbaste

- Coat of arms
- Location of Barbaste
- Location within France Location within Nouvelle-Aquitaine
- Coordinates: 44°10′12″N 0°17′14″E
- Country: France
- Region: Nouvelle-Aquitaine
- Department: Lot-et-Garonne
- Arrondissement: Nérac
- Canton: Lavardac

Government
  - Mayor (2020–2026): Valérie Tonin
- Area^{1}: 38.7 km^{2} (14.9 sq mi)
- Elevation: 126 m (413 ft)
- Highest elevation: 146 m (479 ft)
- Lowest elevation: 38 m (125 ft)
- Population (2023): 1,488
  - Density: 38.4/km^{2} (99.6/sq mi)
- Time zone: UTC+01:00 (CET)
  - Summer (DST): UTC+02:00 (CEST)
- INSEE/Postal code: 47021 /47230
- ^{1} French Land Register data, which excludes lakes, ponds, glaciers > 1 km^{2} (0.386 sq mi or 247 acres) and river estuaries.

Barbaste (French pronunciation: [baʁbast]; Occitan: Barbasta) is a commune in the Lot-et-Garonne department in southwestern France.

== Population ==
Historical population
Year	Pop.	±% p.a.
1968	1,354	—
1975	1,373	+0.20%
1982	1,316	−0.60%
1990	1,354	+0.36%
1999	1,416	+0.50%
2007	1,483	+0.58%
2012	1,529	+0.61%
2017	1,522	−0.09%
2023	1,488	−0.38%
Source: INSEE

== See also ==
- Communes of the Lot-et-Garonne department
