= Damazan =

- Commune
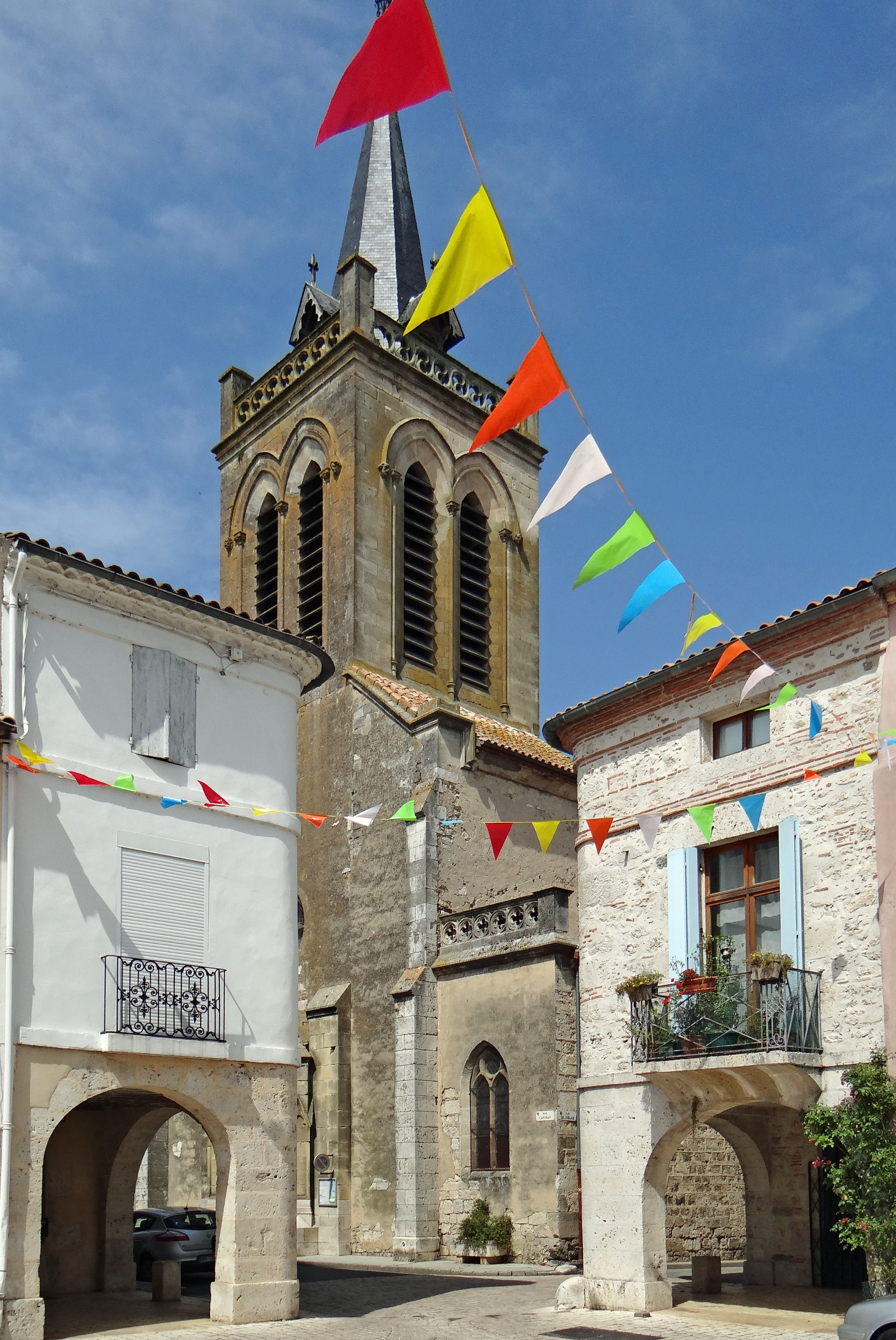
- The church in Damazan

- Coat of arms
- Location of Damazan
- Location within France Location within Nouvelle-Aquitaine
- Coordinates: 44°17′28″N 0°16′35″E
- Country: France
- Region: Nouvelle-Aquitaine
- Department: Lot-et-Garonne
- Arrondissement: Nérac
- Canton: Lavardac
- Intercommunality: Confluent et Coteaux de Prayssas

Government
  - Mayor (2023–2026): Michel Séréna
- Area^{1}: 16.37 km^{2} (6.32 sq mi)
- Elevation: 40 m (130 ft)
- Highest elevation: 147 m (482 ft)
- Lowest elevation: 28 m (92 ft)
- Population (2023): 1,358
  - Density: 82.96/km^{2} (214.9/sq mi)
- Time zone: UTC+01:00 (CET)
  - Summer (DST): UTC+02:00 (CEST)
- INSEE/Postal code: 47078 /47160
- ^{1} French Land Register data, which excludes lakes, ponds, glaciers > 1 km^{2} (0.386 sq mi or 247 acres) and river estuaries.

Damazan (French pronunciation: [damazɑ̃]; Occitan: Damasan) is a commune in the Lot-et-Garonne department in south-western France.

== See also ==
- Communes of the Lot-et-Garonne department
