= Puch-d'Agenais =

- Commune
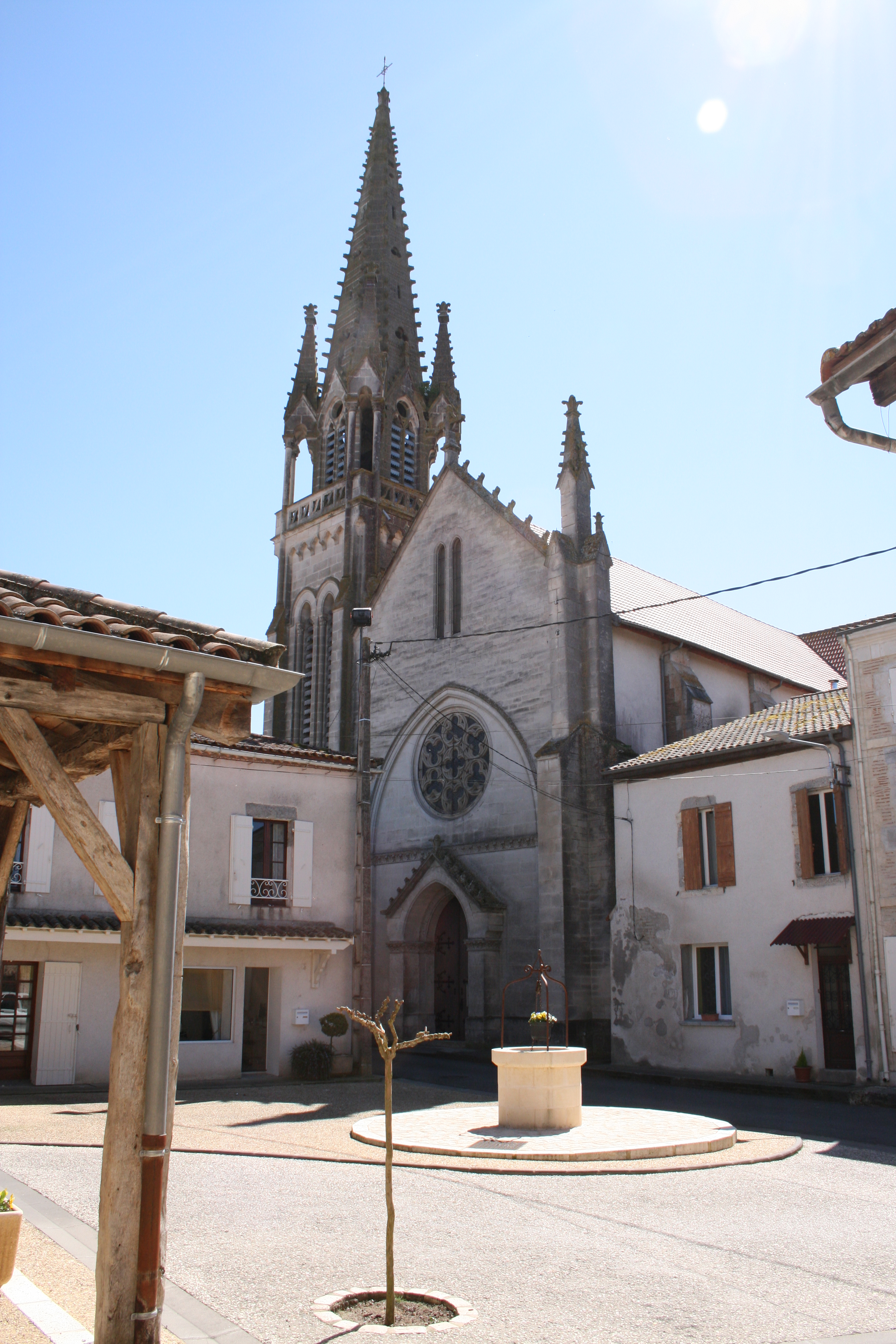
- View of downtown

- Coat of arms
- Location of Puch-d'Agenais
- Location within France Location within Nouvelle-Aquitaine
- Coordinates: 44°19′46″N 0°14′39″E
- Country: France
- Region: Nouvelle-Aquitaine
- Department: Lot-et-Garonne
- Arrondissement: Nérac
- Canton: Lavardac
- Intercommunality: Confluent et Coteaux de Prayssas

Government
  - Mayor (2020–2026): Alain Maille
- Area^{1}: 23 km^{2} (8.9 sq mi)
- Elevation: 100 m (330 ft)
- Highest elevation: 123 m (404 ft)
- Lowest elevation: 27 m (89 ft)
- Population (2023): 718
  - Density: 31/km^{2} (81/sq mi)
- Time zone: UTC+01:00 (CET)
  - Summer (DST): UTC+02:00 (CEST)
- INSEE/Postal code: 47214 /47160
- ^{1} French Land Register data, which excludes lakes, ponds, glaciers > 1 km^{2} (0.386 sq mi or 247 acres) and river estuaries.

Puch-d'Agenais is a commune in the Lot-et-Garonne department in south-western France.

== See also ==
- Communes of the Lot-et-Garonne department
