= Louis Raffy =

French organist and composer

Antoine Louis Raffy (1868 in Laroque-Timbaut, Lot-et-Garonne – died in March 1931 in Nérac) was a French composer of church music and organist.

== Biography ==
Raffy was organist at the Église Saint-Nicolas de Nérac which has an organ of 23 stops built by the Magen company of Agen (1862).

== Works ==
=== Organ and harmonium ===
- L’Orgue, 3 booklets, Paris: Loret fils and H. Freytag, (1899–1901).
- Pieces in Échos jubilaires des maîtres de l’orgue, published by abbott Henri Delépine, Procure de musique religieuse (1908 and 1929).
- Pieces in the Archives de l’Organiste, 8 vol. published by H. Delépine, Procure de musique religieuse.
- École d’Orgue, Méthode complète pour harmonium, 2 vol., Saint-Leu-la-Forêt: Procure de musique religieuse (1908).
- Célèbres et Grands Organistes Célèbres et Grands Maîtres Classiques, collection of pieces for organ or harmonium, for the use of the divine service, chosen and annotated by Louis Raffy, 6 vol, Op. 57-62. Arras: Procure générale de musique religieuse (1910–13).
- 10 Pieces for organ or harmonium, St-Laurent-sur-Sèvre: L.-J. Biton, (1913).
- 200 Versets, préludes, antiennes, etc. dans les tons majeurs et mineurs les plus usités, extraits des œuvres des maîtres anciens, choisis ou transcrits pour l’orgue, Arras: Procure générale de musique religieuse, (1913).
- Pastorale et noël for organ, [s.l.] [s.n.], (1914).
- La Lyre Sacrée, collection of pieces for organ or harmonium, Paris: Procure générale de musique religieuse, s.d.
- Le Service de l’organiste, pièces pratiques pour orgue ou harmonium à l’usage du service divin, in 12 deliveries, 1st delivery (1914).
- Suite pour Orgue Op. 74, St-Laurent-sur-Sèvre: L.-J. Biton, (1914).
- Meditation, for the reed or pipe organ. Extracted from the 2d Series of the Parnassus of the organists for the XXth century, Hythe (Kent): the Organ Music Publishing Office (1914).
- Reflets de vitraux, Op. 81. Pieces for organ or harmonium, 2 vol. Paris: Procure générale (1930).

=== Piano ===
- Dans le vague, elegy for piano, Paris: Loret fils et H. Freylag, (1896).
- Fleurette ! suite of waltzes for piano, Paris: Loret fils and H. Freylag, (1896).
- Gitanilla, bohemian dance for piano, Arras: Société d’éditions modernes, (1912).
- Sorrentina, tarentelle for piano, Arras: Société d’éditions modernes, (1912).
