= Monheurt =

- Commune
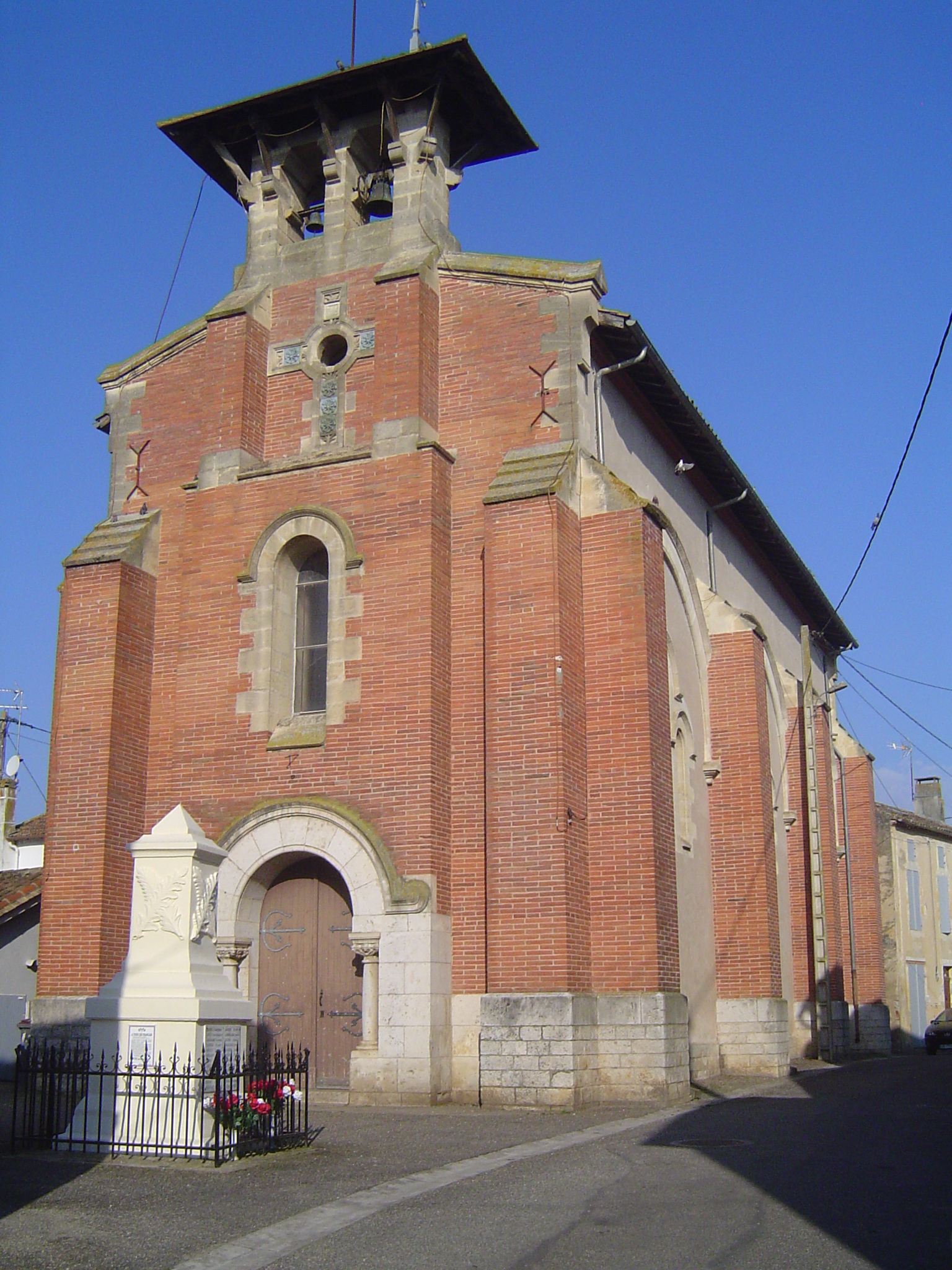
- Church of Saint Cloud
- Location of Monheurt
- Location within France Location within Nouvelle-Aquitaine
- Coordinates: 44°20′28″N 0°18′30″E
- Country: France
- Region: Nouvelle-Aquitaine
- Department: Lot-et-Garonne
- Arrondissement: Nérac
- Canton: Lavardac

Government
  - Mayor (2020–2026): José Armand
- Area^{1}: 11.44 km^{2} (4.42 sq mi)
- Elevation: 71 m (233 ft)
- Highest elevation: 32 m (105 ft)
- Lowest elevation: 22 m (72 ft)
- Population (2023): 190
  - Density: 17/km^{2} (43/sq mi)
- Time zone: UTC+01:00 (CET)
  - Summer (DST): UTC+02:00 (CEST)
- INSEE/Postal code: 47177 /47160
- ^{1} French Land Register data, which excludes lakes, ponds, glaciers > 1 km^{2} (0.386 sq mi or 247 acres) and river estuaries.

Monheurt (French pronunciation: [mɔnœʁ]; Occitan: Monurt) is a commune in the Lot-et-Garonne department in south-western France.

It is located on the left (western) bank of the river Garonne, 6 km south of Tonneins.

== See also ==
- Communes of the Lot-et-Garonne department
