= Saint-Léger, Lot-et-Garonne =

Saint-Léger
- Commune
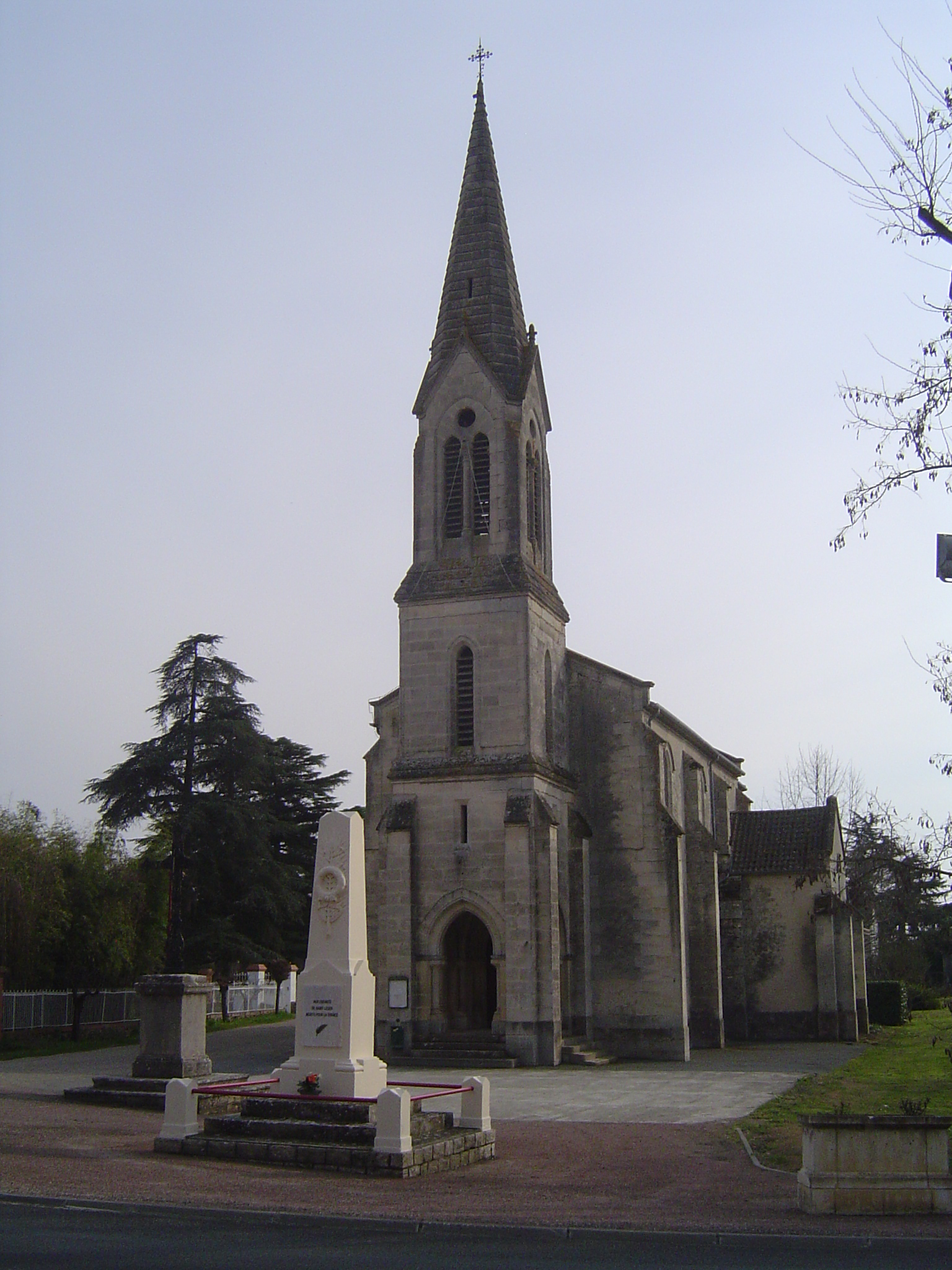
- Church of Saint-Léger
- Location of Saint-Léger
- Location within France Location within Nouvelle-Aquitaine
- Coordinates: 44°17′24″N 0°19′10″E
- Country: France
- Region: Nouvelle-Aquitaine
- Department: Lot-et-Garonne
- Arrondissement: Nérac
- Canton: Lavardac

Government
  - Mayor (2020–2026): Bernard Sauboi
- Area^{1}: 5.79 km^{2} (2.24 sq mi)
- Elevation: 40 m (130 ft)
- Highest elevation: 34 m (112 ft)
- Lowest elevation: 22 m (72 ft)
- Population (2023): 177
  - Density: 30.6/km^{2} (79.2/sq mi)
- Time zone: UTC+01:00 (CET)
  - Summer (DST): UTC+02:00 (CEST)
- INSEE/Postal code: 47250 /47160
- ^{1} French Land Register data, which excludes lakes, ponds, glaciers > 1 km^{2} (0.386 sq mi or 247 acres) and river estuaries.

Saint-Léger (French pronunciation: [sɛ̃ leʒe]; Gascon: Sent Leugèr) is a commune in the Lot-et-Garonne department in south-western France.

== See also ==
- Communes of the Lot-et-Garonne department
