= Mortagne-au-Perche =

- Subprefecture and commune
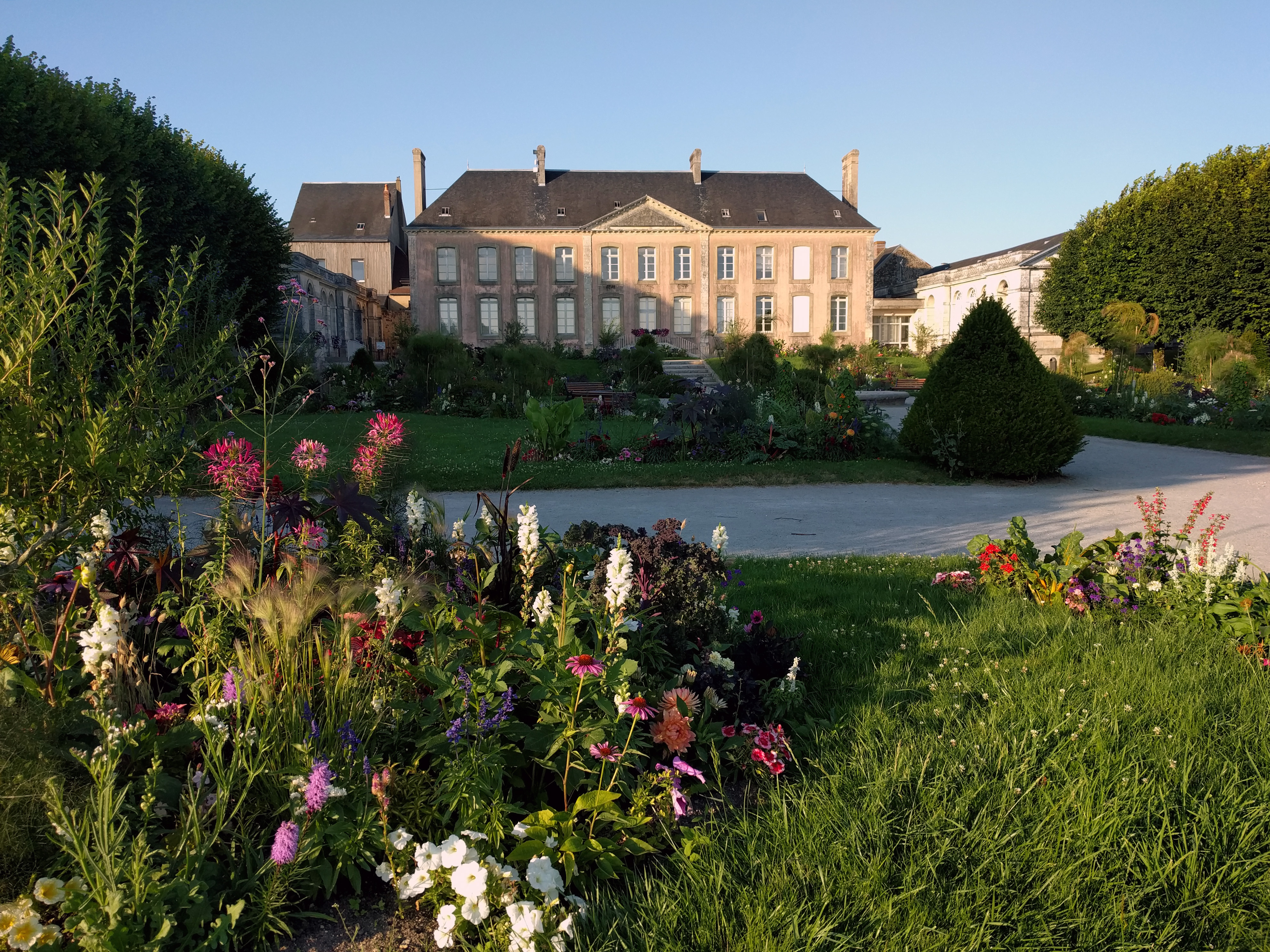
- The town hall in Mortagne-au-Perche

- Coat of arms
- Location of Mortagne-au-Perche
- Location within France Location within Normandy
- Coordinates: 48°31′15″N 0°32′54″E
- Country: France
- Region: Normandy
- Department: Orne
- Arrondissement: Mortagne-au-Perche
- Canton: Mortagne-au-Perche
- Intercommunality: Pays de Mortagne au Perche

Government
  - Mayor (2020–2026): Virginie Valtier
- Area^{1}: 8.6 km^{2} (3.3 sq mi)
- Elevation: 225 m (738 ft)
- Highest elevation: 264 m (866 ft)
- Lowest elevation: 171 m (561 ft)
- Population (2023): 3,898
  - Density: 450/km^{2} (1,200/sq mi)
- Time zone: UTC+01:00 (CET)
  - Summer (DST): UTC+02:00 (CEST)
- INSEE/Postal code: 61293 /61400
- ^{1} French Land Register data, which excludes lakes, ponds, glaciers > 1 km^{2} (0.386 sq mi or 247 acres) and river estuaries.

Mortagne-au-Perche (French pronunciation: [mɔʁtaɲ o pɛʁʃ]) is a commune in the Orne department in Normandy, northwestern France. It is classed as a Petites Cités de Caractère.

== Geography ==
The Commune is made up of the following collection of villages and hamlets, La Grippé, Mortagne-au-Perche, Loisé, Le Moulin du Pré and Le Tuilot.

La Chippe is a watercourse that traverses through the commune.

== Heraldry ==
Arms of Mortagne-au-Perche	The arms of Mortagne-au-Perche are blazoned : Or, 3 fern fronds vert.

== Population ==
Historical population
Year	Pop.	±% p.a.
1968	4,322	—
1975	4,877	+1.74%
1982	4,851	−0.08%
1990	4,584	−0.71%
1999	4,513	−0.17%
2007	4,156	−1.02%
2012	4,059	−0.47%
2017	3,818	−1.22%
2023	3,898	+0.35%
Source: INSEE

== Points of interest ==
=== Museums ===
- Musée percheron is a Museum of France showcasing local and national history. It also features a collection of medals created by Jules-Clément Chaplain.

=== National heritage sites ===
The Commune has seventeen buildings and areas listed as a Monument historique.

- Hôtel de Longueil a former 15th-century hotel, it was registered as a Monument historique in 1975.
- convent of the Poor Clares of Saint-François a former sixteenth-century convent, registered as a Monument historique in 1920.
- Saint-Nicolas hospital a former sixteenth-century hospital, registered as a Monument historique in 1997.
- Collegiate church of Toussaint a former thirteenth-century church served by a college of canons, registered as a Monument historique in 1972.
- Notre-Dame Church a fifteenth-century church, registered as a Monument historique in 1910.
- Saint-Germain-de-Loisé Church a fifteenth-century church, registered as a Monument historique in 1972.
- Hippodrome de Mortagne-au-Perche the three wooden grandstands at this racecourse are the oldest preserved examples in France; they were registered as a Monument historique in 1996. The stands are used Each year on the first Sunday in September, for the Orne departmental competition for conformation and gait of Percheron horses.
- Hôtel a former eighteenth-century building, it was registered as a monument in 1975.
- Hôtel de Fontenay an eighteenth-century hotel, still in operation, it was registered as a monument in 1975.
- Hotel des Tailles an eighteenth-century hotel, still in operation, it was registered as a monument in 1971.
- House of Henry IV a sixteenth-century house, that Henry IV visited in 1599, it was registered as a monument in 1979.
- Dean Toussaint House a fifteenth-century house built for the dean of the collegiate church, it was registered as a monument in 1975.
- The house of the Counts of Perche a seventeenth-century stately house built on the site of where the counts of Perche resided in the 12th century, it was registered as a monument in 1975.
- Birthplace of Alain a nineteenth-century house where the philosopher Alain was born, it was registered as a monument in 1995.
- Turret house a fifteenth-century house, with a Turret, it was registered as a monument in 1975.
- Porte Saint-Denis a twelfth-century door, revealing a Cart arch that was the entrance to Fort Toussaint, it was registered as a monument in 1975.
- Statue of Neptune' located in the garden of the town hall, this statue was created in 1866 by Emmanuel Frémiet. It was registered as a monument in 2006.

== Notable people ==
- Marie of Armagnac (c. 1420–1473), duchess of Alençon, died here in 1473
- Marin Boucher (1587 or 1589–1671) pioneer of early New France, one of the most prolific ancestors of French Canada was born here.
- Zacharie Cloutier (1590–1677), Québécois settler was born here.
- Pierre Boucher (1622–1717), City of Boucherville founder was born here.
- Gilles Hocquart (1694-1783), Intendant of New France was born here.
- Joseph-Geneviève de Puisaye (1755–1827), born in Mortagne-au-Perche, representative of the percheronne nobility in the Généraux States of Versailles of 1789
- Achille Giroux (1694-1783), a French painter and lithographer was born here.
- Jules-Clément Chaplain (1839–1909), sculptor and medallist, was born here
- Ernest Granger (1844–1914), French politician, was born here
- Émile Chartier (1868–1951), philosopher and antimilitarist, born in Mortagne-au-Perche.
- Marie Glory (1905–2009), an actress was born here.
- Michel Fleury (1923–2002), historian, archivist and archaeologist, is buried here
- Jean-Pierre Grivois, writer and music scholar, born in Mortagne-au-Perche
- Jean-Claude Lenoir (born 1944), member of the National Assembly of France between 1993 and 2012, was born here

== Sport ==
The commune has a swimming pool the Piscine intercommunale de Mortagne au Perche, which has been open since 2006. The pool features a 100 m² leisure area (pool, counter-current river, jets and massage bath), paddling pool and a 25 x 10 meter sports pool.

== Twin towns – sister cities ==
Mortagne-au-Perche is twinned with:

- Wietmarschen, Germany since 1989
- Boucherville, Canada since 1965
- Mopti, Mali since 1975

== See also ==
- Communes of the Orne department
- Perche
