= Bruch, Lot-et-Garonne =

Bruch
- Commune
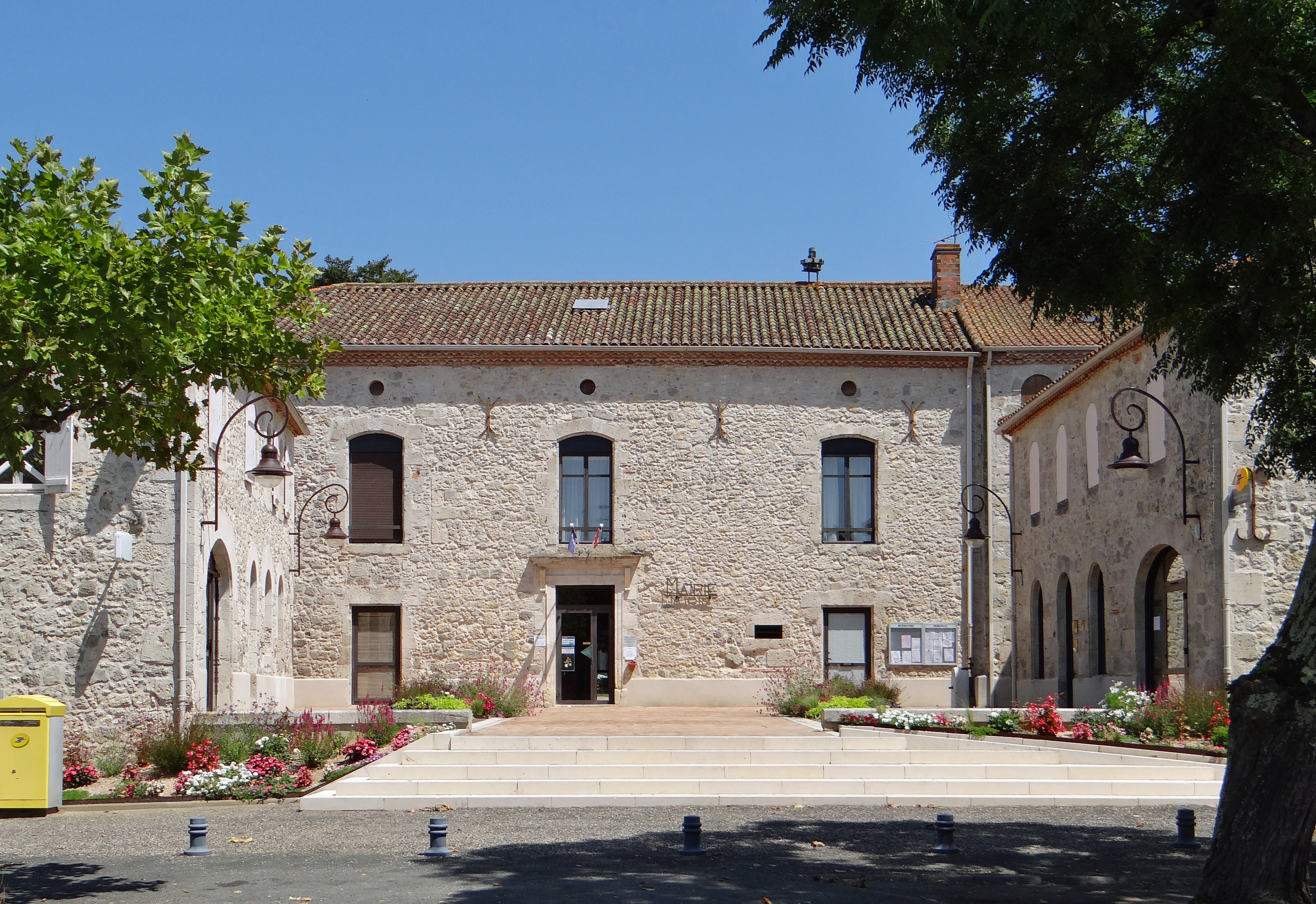
- Town hall
- Location of Bruch
- Location within France Location within Nouvelle-Aquitaine
- Coordinates: 44°12′22″N 0°24′45″E
- Country: France
- Region: Nouvelle-Aquitaine
- Department: Lot-et-Garonne
- Arrondissement: Nérac
- Canton: Lavardac

Government
  - Mayor (2020–2026): Alain Lorenzelli (UDI)
- Area^{1}: 15.89 km^{2} (6.14 sq mi)
- Elevation: 28 m (92 ft)
- Highest elevation: 159 m (522 ft)
- Lowest elevation: 35 m (115 ft)
- Population (2023): 688
  - Density: 43.3/km^{2} (112/sq mi)
- Time zone: UTC+01:00 (CET)
  - Summer (DST): UTC+02:00 (CEST)
- INSEE/Postal code: 47041 /47130
- ^{1} French Land Register data, which excludes lakes, ponds, glaciers > 1 km^{2} (0.386 sq mi or 247 acres) and river estuaries.

Bruch (French pronunciation: [bʁyʃ]; Occitan: Bruish) is a commune in the Lot-et-Garonne department in southwestern France.

== Population ==
Historical population
Year	Pop.	±% p.a.
1968	710	—
1975	749	+0.77%
1982	700	−0.96%
1990	703	+0.05%
1999	721	+0.28%
2007	763	+0.71%
2012	784	+0.54%
2017	748	−0.94%
2023	688	−1.38%
Source: INSEE

== See also ==
- Communes of the Lot-et-Garonne department
