= Ambrus, Lot-et-Garonne =

Ambrus
- Commune
- Location of Ambrus
- Location within France Location within Nouvelle-Aquitaine
- Coordinates: 44°13′44″N 0°14′38″E
- Country: France
- Region: Nouvelle-Aquitaine
- Department: Lot-et-Garonne
- Arrondissement: Nérac
- Canton: Lavardac
- Intercommunality: Confluent et Coteaux de Prayssas

Government
  - Mayor (2020–2026): Christian Lafougère
- Area^{1}: 12.35 km^{2} (4.77 sq mi)
- Elevation: 120 m (390 ft)
- Highest elevation: 175 m (574 ft)
- Lowest elevation: 68 m (223 ft)
- Population (2023): 110
  - Density: 8.9/km^{2} (23/sq mi)
- Time zone: UTC+01:00 (CET)
  - Summer (DST): UTC+02:00 (CEST)
- INSEE/Postal code: 47008 /47160
- ^{1} French Land Register data, which excludes lakes, ponds, glaciers > 1 km^{2} (0.386 sq mi or 247 acres) and river estuaries.

Ambrus is a commune in the Lot-et-Garonne department in southwestern France.

== Population ==
Historical population
| Year | Pop. | ±% p.a. |
|---|---|---|
| 1968 | 92 | — |
| 1975 | 97 | +0.76% |
| 1982 | 81 | −2.54% |
| 1990 | 78 | −0.47% |
| 1999 | 71 | −1.04% |
| 2007 | 93 | +3.43% |
| 2012 | 108 | +3.04% |
| 2017 | 113 | +0.91% |
| 2023 | 110 | −0.45% |
Source: INSEE

== See also ==
- Communes of the Lot-et-Garonne department
