= Xaintrailles =

- Commune
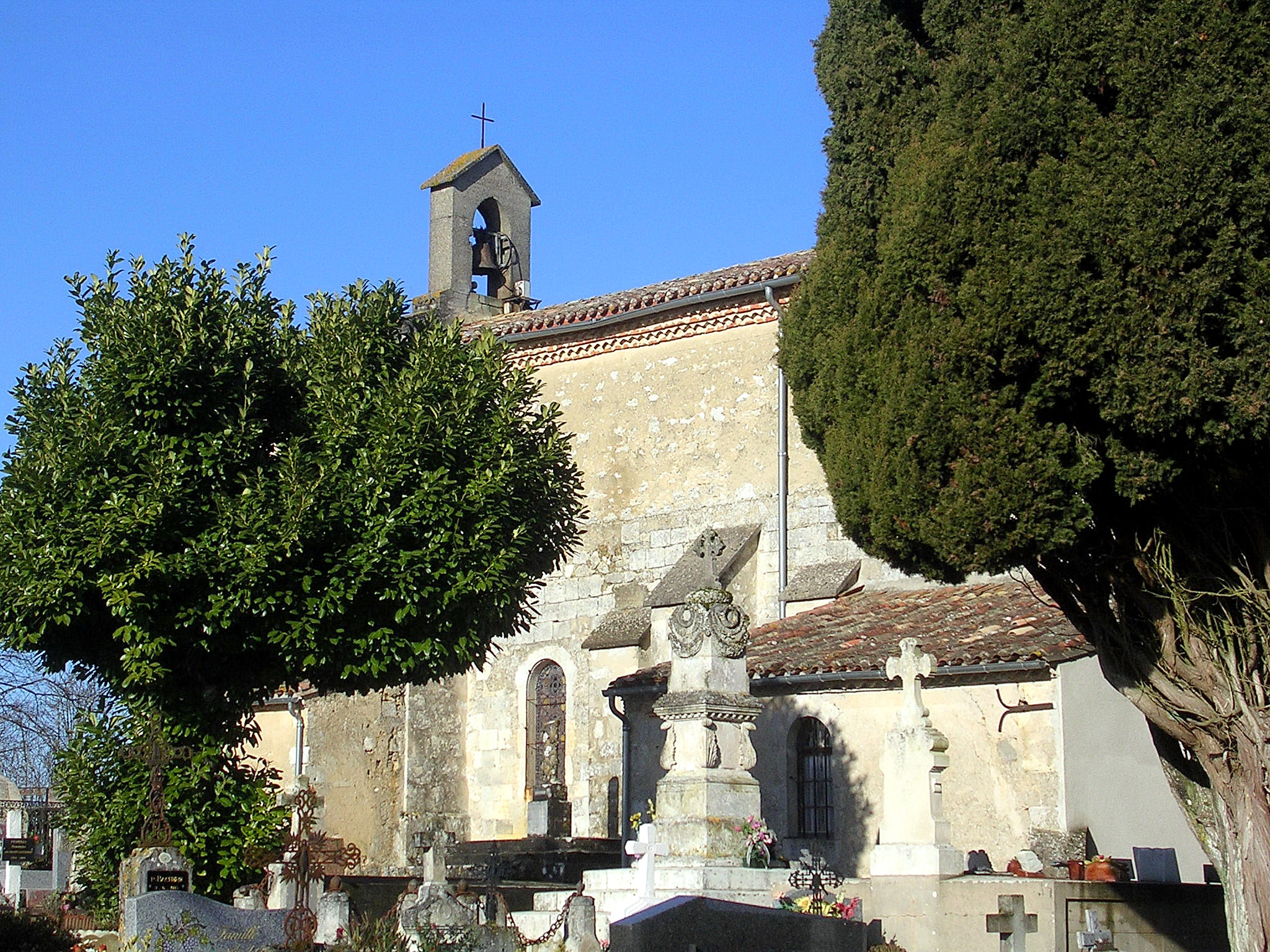
- The church in Xaintrailles

- Coat of arms
- Location of Xaintrailles
- Location within France Location within Nouvelle-Aquitaine
- Coordinates: 44°12′23″N 0°15′32″E
- Country: France
- Region: Nouvelle-Aquitaine
- Department: Lot-et-Garonne
- Arrondissement: Nérac
- Canton: Lavardac
- Intercommunality: Albret Communauté

Government
  - Mayor (2020–2026): Michèle Autipout
- Area^{1}: 10.26 km^{2} (3.96 sq mi)
- Elevation: 210 m (690 ft)
- Highest elevation: 196 m (643 ft)
- Lowest elevation: 80 m (260 ft)
- Population (2023): 378
  - Density: 36.8/km^{2} (95.4/sq mi)
- Time zone: UTC+01:00 (CET)
  - Summer (DST): UTC+02:00 (CEST)
- INSEE/Postal code: 47327 /47230
- ^{1} French Land Register data, which excludes lakes, ponds, glaciers > 1 km^{2} (0.386 sq mi or 247 acres) and river estuaries.

Xaintrailles (French pronunciation: [sɛ̃tʁaj]; Occitan: Sentralha) is a commune in the Lot-et-Garonne department in south-western France.

== Population ==
Historical population
| Year | Pop. | ±% p.a. |
|---|---|---|
| 1968 | 408 | — |
| 1975 | 342 | −2.49% |
| 1982 | 349 | +0.29% |
| 1990 | 410 | +2.03% |
| 1999 | 396 | −0.39% |
| 2007 | 382 | −0.45% |
| 2012 | 412 | +1.52% |
| 2017 | 418 | +0.29% |
| 2023 | 378 | −1.66% |
Source: INSEE

== See also ==
- Communes of the Lot-et-Garonne department
