= Marin Boucher =

- Born: 1587 (age 439); Mortagne-au-Perche
- Died: 25 March 1671 (aged 83–84); Château-Richer
- Occupations: stonemason and carpenter
- Spouse(s): Julienne Baril (M. 1611) & Perrine Maillet (M. 1630)

Marin Boucher (1587 or 1589–1671), was a pioneer of early New France and one of the most prolific ancestors of French Canada, being the ancestor of most of the Bouchers of North America, particularly in the Province of Quebec, Northern New Brunswick, Ontario and Western Canada. Estimates of the number of families in Canada and the United States descended from Marin Boucher run as high as 350,000, although most of them do not bear the name Boucher today because Marin's line produced more daughters than sons.

== Biography ==
Marin Boucher was born in Mortagne, Perche province, France about 1587 and died on 25 March 1671 in Château-Richer, Canada, New France.

He married twice: (1) to Julienne Baril (1574–1627) in 1611 and (2) to Perrine Mallet (1604–1687) before 1630. Marin and Julienne had seven children, one of whom travelled to Canada. Marin and Perrine had seven more children, five of whom were born in Canada.

The Bouchers were stonemasons and carpenters, skills which were valuable in the early colony. Because of some work done for Samuel de Champlain, the Founder of the colony, Marin Boucher was deeded Champlain's clothes in his will when he died. He was also a witness in a dispute over stolen property in which his relation Gaspard Boucher was the plaintiff.

== Family History ==
Marin Boucher's sister, Jeanne Boucher, married Thomas Hayot (spellings vary: Hayot; Ayot; Ayotte, etc.) who was also an early settler and founder of a distinguished Québec family.

Gaspard Boucher was another close relation who emigrated to New France, believed by some researchers to have been Marin's brother, though more likely his cousin. Gaspard Boucher was father of Pierre Boucher Seigneur of Boucherville, and founder of the parish and township of Boucherville, across the Saint-Laurent River from Montreal. Pierre Boucher became Governor of Trois-Rivières and a Royal Judge, was ennobled, and settled on his seigneurie, where he founded a model seigneurie, village and Parish which is now a suburban satellite of Montreal.

The Bouchers arrived as part of the Percheron immigration movement, consisting of a mix of families and single individual from the region of Perche, at the time part of Maine province, brought over to New France in 1634 to colonize Beauport, a seigneurie granted to Robert Giffard, physician to the colony. Marin Boucher and his son François migrated aboard the ship St-Jehan under the command of Captain Pierre Nesle, which arrived in Quebec on June 4, 1634. His wife and younger children arrived the following year.

The colonists were temporarily housed in the Habitation (Fort St-Louis), the fort and residence built by Samuel de Champlain at Quebec in 1608, before moving to their land concessions at Beauport, a short distance down river from Quebec.

Gaspard Boucher may have arrived with his family separately in 1635 according to the memoires of his son, Sieur Pierre Boucher de Boucherville.

Marin Boucher and his family subsequently moved to the South Shore where they were pioneers of the town of Rivière-Ouelle. The town was attacked during King William's War by a party led by Sir William Phips in October 1690, and Marin's son, Jean-Galleran was among the 39 "Heroes of Rivière-Ouelle" who defended the town. Phips, whose troops had been pillaging along the coast of the St-Laurent on their way to lay siege to Québec City, was repulsed by the ambush, and later was unsuccessful in his attack on Québec.

== Genealogy ==
Genealogical information on the Bouchers can be found in the works of Abbé Cyprien Tanguay; Abbé Archange Godbout; René Jetté; and other standard reference works on French Canadian genealogy.

Two early settlers of Acadia are believed to be descended from Marin Boucher of New France, including a Jaques Boucher who shows up in a 1700 census of Port Royale (in present-day Nova Scotia), and a Pierre Boucher who went to Grand Pré and married Anne Hebert on or around 1714. There are several other lines of Bouchers, including that of Jean Boucher (born on or around 1650 in St-Etienne du Bourg de Chaix, France), in Quebec. There are descendants of Marin Boucher in Maine, Massachusetts, California, Florida, Rhode Island, etc. There are also Bouchers descended from Marin Boucher in Louisiana, either of Acadian (Cadien or Cajun) descent or more directly descended from the Canadian (Quebec) lines.

== Monuments ==
With the other early pioneers, Marin Boucher and his wife are commemorated by a plaque in Quebec City.

Marin's nephew (or cousin, depending upon the source), Pierre Boucher, is commemorated by a statue on the Assemblée Nationale, the Provincial Legislature Building in Quebec City, and in a stained glass window in a church in Mortagne, Perche.

A number of places and streets are named after various members of the Boucher family.
