= Laroque-Timbaut =

- Commune
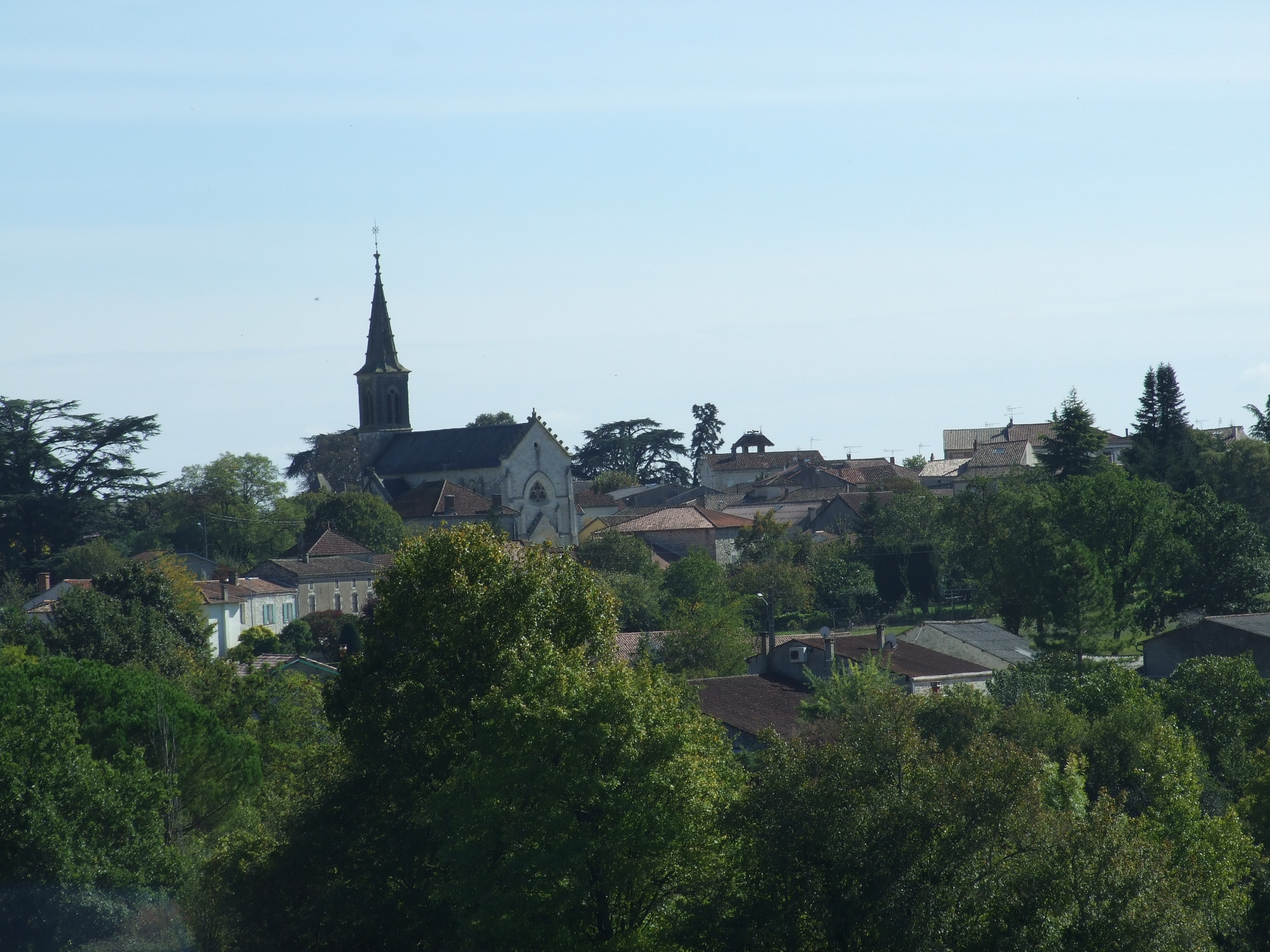

- Coat of arms
- Location of Laroque-Timbaut
- Location within France Location within Nouvelle-Aquitaine
- Coordinates: 44°17′02″N 0°45′46″E
- Country: France
- Region: Nouvelle-Aquitaine
- Department: Lot-et-Garonne
- Arrondissement: Agen
- Canton: Le Pays de Serres
- Intercommunality: CA Grand Villeneuvois

Government
  - Mayor (2022–2026): Jean-Jacques Dulaurier
- Area^{1}: 21.64 km^{2} (8.36 sq mi)
- Elevation: 143 m (469 ft)
- Highest elevation: 222 m (728 ft)
- Lowest elevation: 87 m (285 ft)
- Population (2023): 1,589
  - Density: 73.43/km^{2} (190.2/sq mi)
- Time zone: UTC+01:00 (CET)
  - Summer (DST): UTC+02:00 (CEST)
- INSEE/Postal code: 47138 /47340
- ^{1} French Land Register data, which excludes lakes, ponds, glaciers > 1 km^{2} (0.386 sq mi or 247 acres) and river estuaries.

Laroque-Timbaut (French pronunciation: [laʁɔk tɛ̃bo]; Occitan: La Ròca Timbaud) is a commune in the Lot-et-Garonne department in south-western France. The composer and organist Louis Raffy was born in Laroque-Timbaut. Laroque-Timbaut station has rail connections to Périgueux and Agen.

== See also ==
- Communes of the Lot-et-Garonne department
