= Jean-Pierre Grivois =

French writer and music scholar

- Born: 1940 (age 86); Mortagne-au-Perche
- Occupations: Author & musical Scholar

Jean-Pierre Grivois is a French writer and music scholar. He was born in Mortagne, Orne. He is a retired businessman and amateur organist; he also researched the life and music of Johann Sebastian Bach for more than fifteen years, which resulted in two acclaimed books, Moi, JSB and Entre es notes de Bach.
