= Pompiey =

- Commune
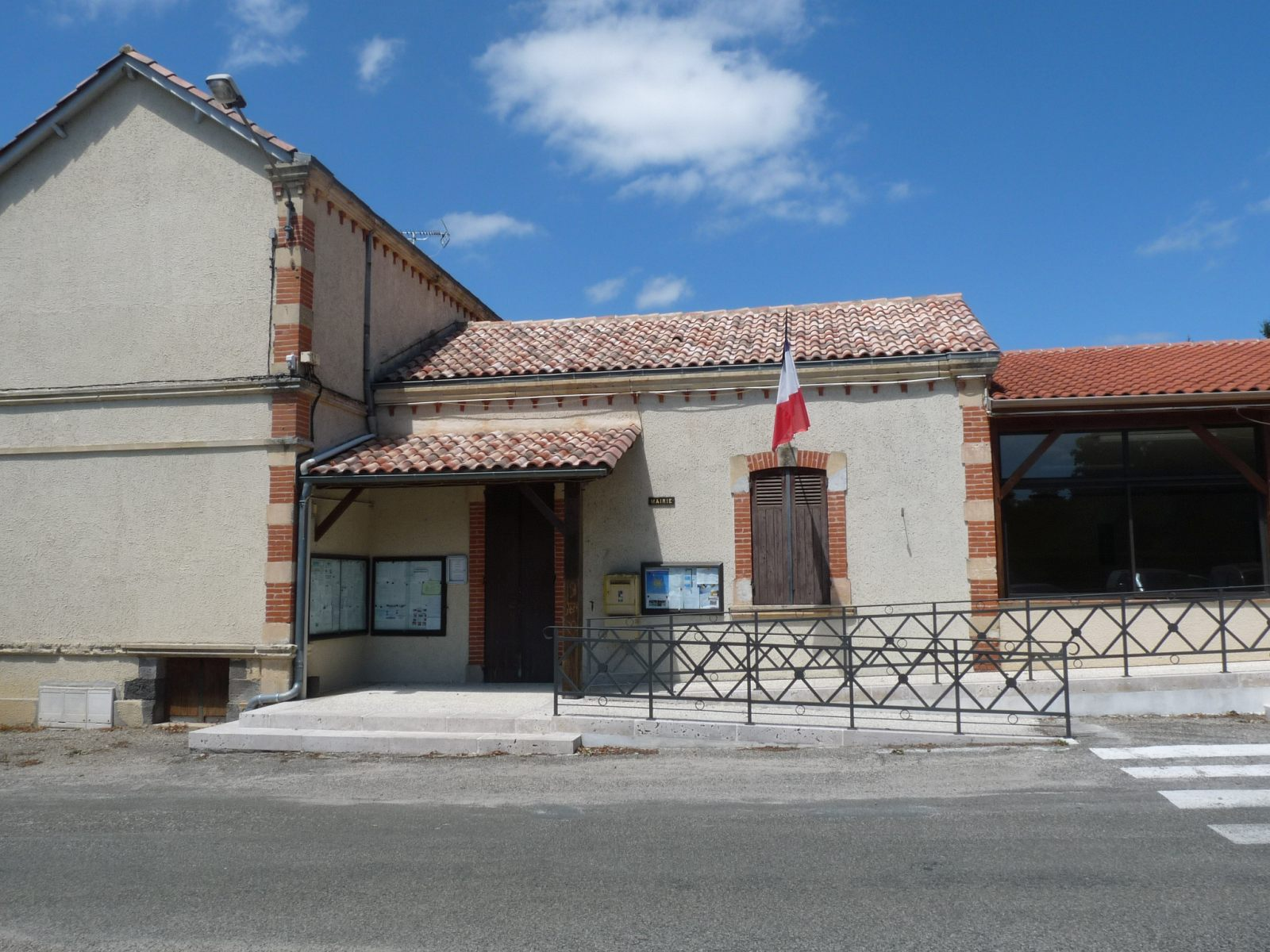
- Pompiey Town hall
- Location of Pompiey
- Location within France Location within Nouvelle-Aquitaine
- Coordinates: 44°11′36″N 0°13′46″E
- Country: France
- Region: Nouvelle-Aquitaine
- Department: Lot-et-Garonne
- Arrondissement: Nérac
- Canton: Lavardac
- Intercommunality: Albret Communauté

Government
  - Mayor (2020–2026): Jean-Pierre Suarez
- Area^{1}: 19.61 km^{2} (7.57 sq mi)
- Elevation: 108 m (354 ft)
- Highest elevation: 191 m (627 ft)
- Lowest elevation: 73 m (240 ft)
- Population (2023): 224
  - Density: 11.4/km^{2} (29.6/sq mi)
- Time zone: UTC+01:00 (CET)
  - Summer (DST): UTC+02:00 (CEST)
- INSEE/Postal code: 47207 /47230
- ^{1} French Land Register data, which excludes lakes, ponds, glaciers > 1 km^{2} (0.386 sq mi or 247 acres) and river estuaries.

Pompiey (French pronunciation: [pɔ̃pjɛ]; Occitan: Pompièir) is a commune in the Lot-et-Garonne department in south-western France.

== See also ==
- Communes of the Lot-et-Garonne department
