= Razimet =

- Commune
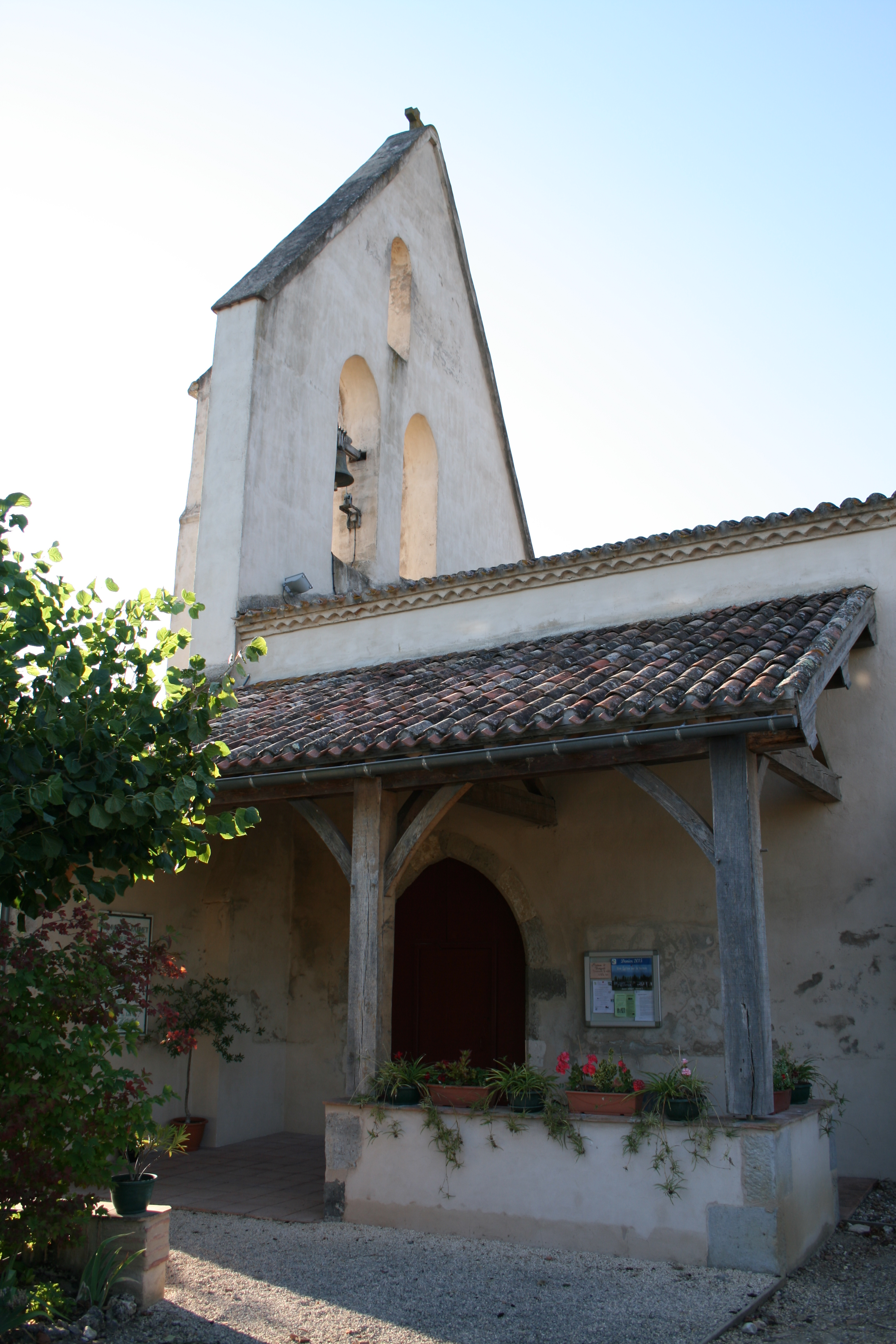
- Location of Razimet
- Location within France Location within Nouvelle-Aquitaine
- Coordinates: 44°21′11″N 0°14′09″E
- Country: France
- Region: Nouvelle-Aquitaine
- Department: Lot-et-Garonne
- Arrondissement: Nérac
- Canton: Lavardac
- Intercommunality: Confluent et Coteaux de Prayssas

Government
  - Mayor (2020–2026): Daniel Teullet
- Area^{1}: 7.18 km^{2} (2.77 sq mi)
- Elevation: 100 m (330 ft)
- Highest elevation: 101 m (331 ft)
- Lowest elevation: 36 m (118 ft)
- Population (2023): 309
  - Density: 43.0/km^{2} (111/sq mi)
- Time zone: UTC+01:00 (CET)
  - Summer (DST): UTC+02:00 (CEST)
- INSEE/Postal code: 47220 /47160
- ^{1} French Land Register data, which excludes lakes, ponds, glaciers > 1 km^{2} (0.386 sq mi or 247 acres) and river estuaries.

Razimet (French pronunciation: [ʁazimɛ]; Occitan: Rasimet) is a commune in the Lot-et-Garonne department in south-western France.

== See also ==
- Communes of the Lot-et-Garonne department
