= Thouars-sur-Garonne =

- Commune
- Location of Thouars-sur-Garonne
- Location within France Location within Nouvelle-Aquitaine
- Coordinates: 44°15′12″N 0°20′11″E
- Country: France
- Region: Nouvelle-Aquitaine
- Department: Lot-et-Garonne
- Arrondissement: Nérac
- Canton: Lavardac
- Intercommunality: Albret Communauté

Government
  - Mayor (2020–2026): Jean-Pierre Vicini
- Area^{1}: 4.03 km^{2} (1.56 sq mi)
- Elevation: 30 m (98 ft)
- Highest elevation: 39 m (128 ft)
- Lowest elevation: 27 m (89 ft)
- Population (2023): 228
  - Density: 56.6/km^{2} (147/sq mi)
- Time zone: UTC+01:00 (CET)
  - Summer (DST): UTC+02:00 (CEST)
- INSEE/Postal code: 47308 /47230
- ^{1} French Land Register data, which excludes lakes, ponds, glaciers > 1 km^{2} (0.386 sq mi or 247 acres) and river estuaries.

Thouars-sur-Garonne (French pronunciation: [twaʁ syʁ ɡaʁɔn], literally Thouars on Garonne; Occitan: Toars) is a commune in the Lot-et-Garonne department in south-western France.

== See also ==
- Communes of the Lot-et-Garonne department
