= Buzet-sur-Baïse =

- Commune
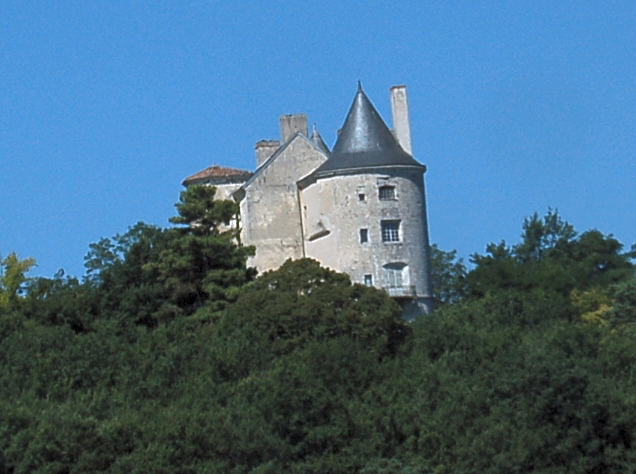
- Château de Buzet

- Coat of arms
- Location of Buzet-sur-Baïse
- Location within France Location within Nouvelle-Aquitaine
- Coordinates: 44°15′32″N 0°18′00″E
- Country: France
- Region: Nouvelle-Aquitaine
- Department: Lot-et-Garonne
- Arrondissement: Nérac
- Canton: Lavardac

Government
  - Mayor (2020–2026): Jean-Louis Molinié
- Area^{1}: 21.15 km^{2} (8.17 sq mi)
- Highest elevation: 143 m (469 ft)
- Lowest elevation: 22 m (72 ft)
- Population (2023): 1,245
  - Density: 58.87/km^{2} (152.5/sq mi)
- Time zone: UTC+01:00 (CET)
  - Summer (DST): UTC+02:00 (CEST)
- INSEE/Postal code: 47043 /47160
- ^{1} French Land Register data, which excludes lakes, ponds, glaciers > 1 km^{2} (0.386 sq mi or 247 acres) and river estuaries.

Buzet-sur-Baïse (French pronunciation: [byzɛ syʁ ba.iz], literally Buzet on Baïse; Occitan: Busèth) is a commune in the Lot-et-Garonne department in southwestern France. It stands on the voie verte cycle path between the Mediterranean and close to Bordeaux.

== Population ==
Historical population
Year	Pop.	±% p.a.
1968	1,453	—
1975	1,345	−1.10%
1982	1,317	−0.30%
1990	1,353	+0.34%
1999	1,236	−1.00%
2007	1,237	+0.01%
2012	1,311	+1.17%
2017	1,284	−0.42%
2023	1,245	−0.51%
Source: INSEE

== See also ==
- Communes of the Lot-et-Garonne department
