= Montgaillard-en-Albret =

- Commune
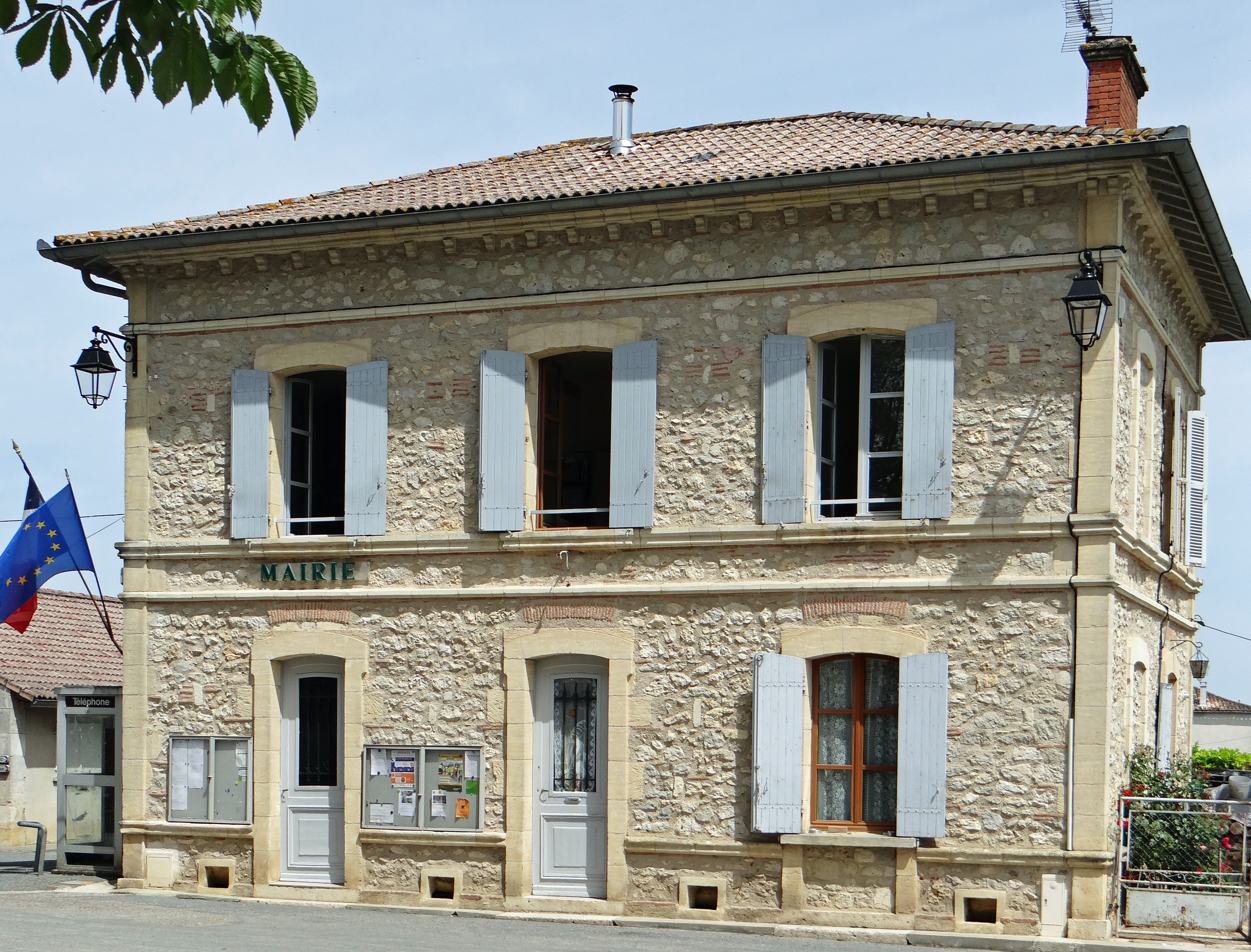
- Montgaillard-en-Albret Town hall
- Location of Montgaillard-en-Albret
- Location within France Location within Nouvelle-Aquitaine
- Coordinates: 44°12′29″N 0°17′39″E
- Country: France
- Region: Nouvelle-Aquitaine
- Department: Lot-et-Garonne
- Arrondissement: Nérac
- Canton: Lavardac
- Intercommunality: Albret Communauté

Government
  - Mayor (2020–2026): Henri de Colombel
- Area^{1}: 8.53 km^{2} (3.29 sq mi)
- Elevation: 200 m (660 ft)
- Highest elevation: 163 m (535 ft)
- Lowest elevation: 50 m (160 ft)
- Population (2023): 167
  - Density: 19.6/km^{2} (50.7/sq mi)
- Time zone: UTC+01:00 (CET)
  - Summer (DST): UTC+02:00 (CEST)
- INSEE/Postal code: 47176 /47230
- ^{1} French Land Register data, which excludes lakes, ponds, glaciers > 1 km^{2} (0.386 sq mi or 247 acres) and river estuaries.

Montgaillard-en-Albret (French pronunciation: [mɔ̃ɡajaʁ]; Occitan: Montgalhard; before 2022: Mongaillard) is a commune in the Lot-et-Garonne department in south-western France.

== See also ==
- Communes of the Lot-et-Garonne department
