= Montesquieu, Lot-et-Garonne =

Montesquieu
- Commune
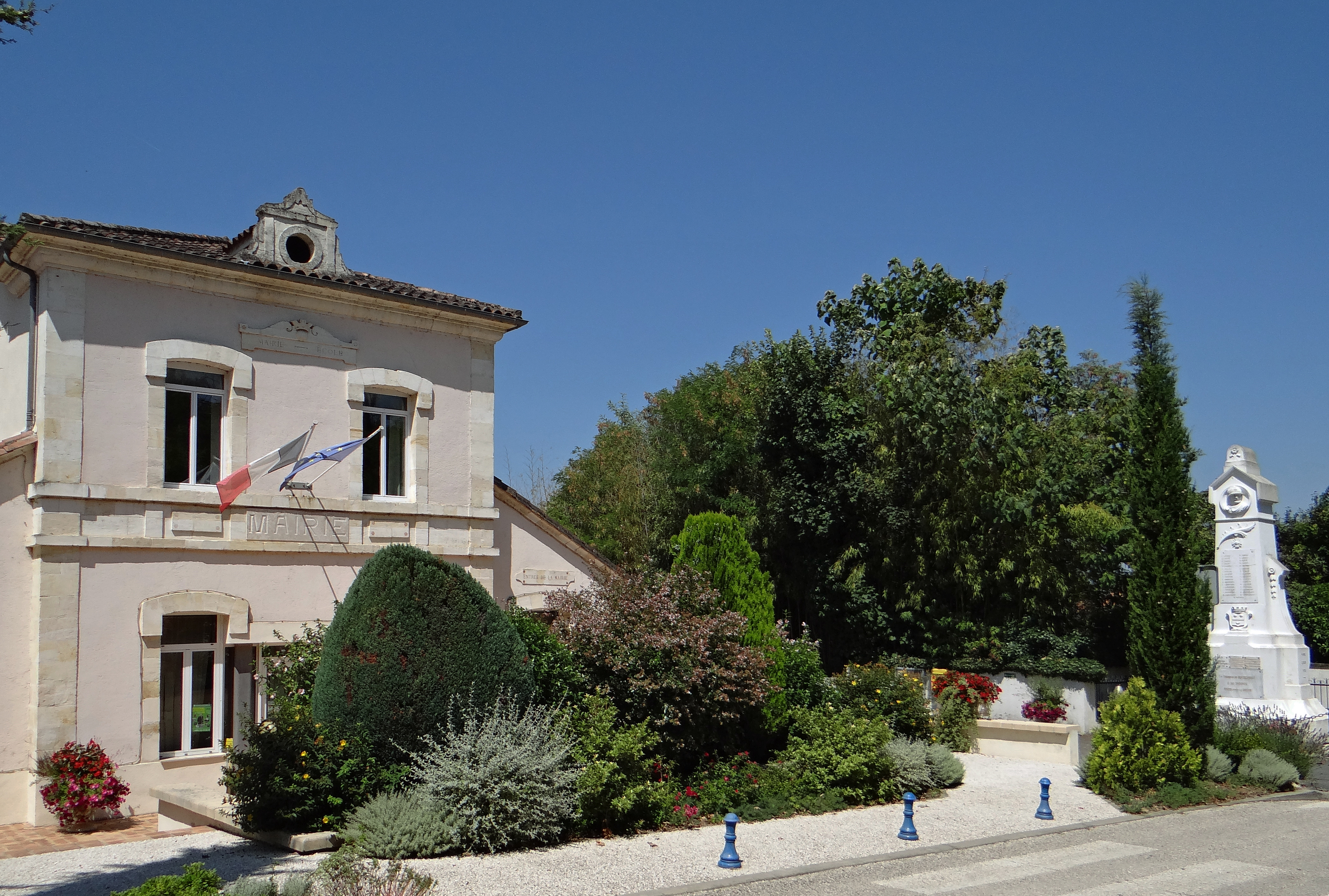
- Montesquieu Town hall

- Coat of arms
- Location of Montesquieu
- Location within France Location within Nouvelle-Aquitaine
- Coordinates: 44°12′09″N 0°26′19″E
- Country: France
- Region: Nouvelle-Aquitaine
- Department: Lot-et-Garonne
- Arrondissement: Nérac
- Canton: Lavardac
- Intercommunality: Albret Communauté

Government
  - Mayor (2020–2026): Alain Polo
- Area^{1}: 25.53 km^{2} (9.86 sq mi)
- Elevation: 47 m (154 ft)
- Highest elevation: 163 m (535 ft)
- Lowest elevation: 30 m (98 ft)
- Population (2023): 733
  - Density: 28.7/km^{2} (74.4/sq mi)
- Time zone: UTC+01:00 (CET)
  - Summer (DST): UTC+02:00 (CEST)
- INSEE/Postal code: 47186 /47130
- ^{1} French Land Register data, which excludes lakes, ponds, glaciers > 1 km^{2} (0.386 sq mi or 247 acres) and river estuaries.

Montesquieu (French pronunciation: [mɔ̃tɛskjø]; Lengadocian: Montesquiu) is a commune in the department of Lot-et-Garonne and the region of Nouvelle-Aquitaine, southwestern France.

== Demography ==
Historical population
Year	Pop.	±% p.a.
1968	812	—
1975	687	−2.36%
1982	712	+0.51%
1990	658	−0.98%
1999	714	+0.91%
2007	771	+0.96%
2012	759	−0.31%
2017	783	+0.62%
2023	733	−1.09%
Source: INSEE

== See also ==
- Communes of the Lot-et-Garonne department
