= Canton of Lavardac =

Coordinates: 44.18°N 0.30°E

The canton of Lavardac is an administrative division of the Lot-et-Garonne department, southwestern France. Its borders were modified at the French canton reorganisation which came into effect in March 2015. Its seat is in Lavardac.

It consists of the following communes:

1. Ambrus
2. Barbaste
3. Bruch
4. Buzet-sur-Baïse
5. Damazan
6. Feugarolles
7. Lavardac
8. Monheurt
9. Montesquieu
10. Montgaillard-en-Albret
11. Pompiey
12. Puch-d'Agenais
13. Razimet
14. Saint-Laurent
15. Saint-Léger
16. Saint-Léon
17. Saint-Pierre-de-Buzet
18. Thouars-sur-Garonne
19. Vianne
20. Xaintrailles
