= Lavardac =

- Commune
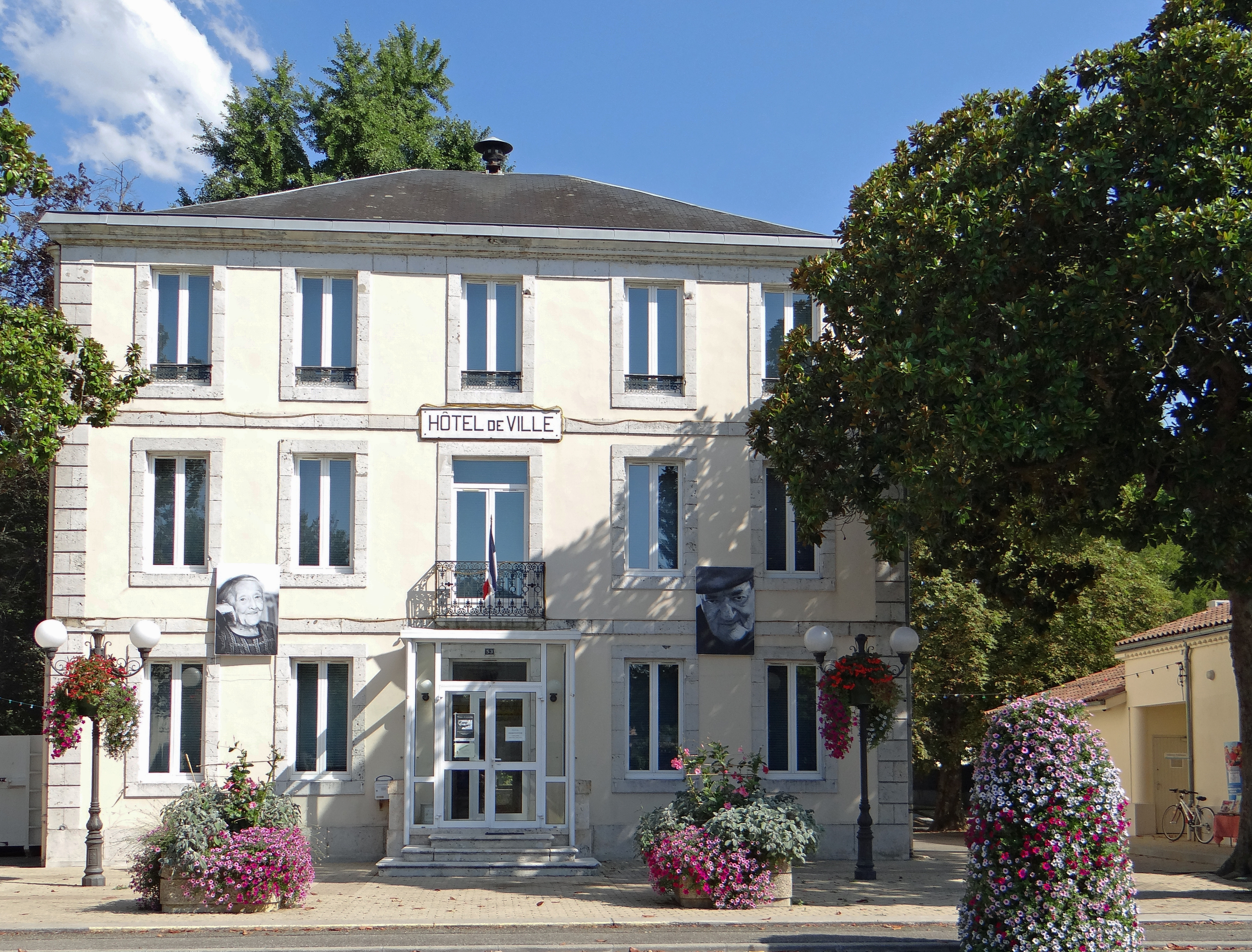
- Lavardac Town hall

- Coat of arms
- Location of Lavardac
- Location within France Location within Nouvelle-Aquitaine
- Coordinates: 44°11′N 0°18′E
- Country: France
- Region: Nouvelle-Aquitaine
- Department: Lot-et-Garonne
- Arrondissement: Nérac
- Canton: Lavardac
- Intercommunality: Albret Communauté

Government
  - Mayor (2020–2026): Ludovic Biasotto
- Area^{1}: 15.1 km^{2} (5.8 sq mi)
- Elevation: 55 m (180 ft)
- Highest elevation: 168 m (551 ft)
- Lowest elevation: 30 m (98 ft)
- Population (2023): 2,307
  - Density: 153/km^{2} (396/sq mi)
- Time zone: UTC+01:00 (CET)
  - Summer (DST): UTC+02:00 (CEST)
- INSEE/Postal code: 47143 /47230
- ^{1} French Land Register data, which excludes lakes, ponds, glaciers > 1 km^{2} (0.386 sq mi or 247 acres) and river estuaries.

Lavardac (French pronunciation: [lavaʁdak]) is a commune in the Lot-et-Garonne department in south-western France.

== Population ==
Historical population
Year	Pop.	±% p.a.
1968	2,376	—
1975	2,532	+0.91%
1982	2,573	+0.23%
1990	2,454	−0.59%
1999	2,261	−0.91%
2007	2,316	+0.30%
2012	2,216	−0.88%
2017	2,260	+0.39%
2023	2,307	+0.34%
Source: INSEE

== See also ==
- Communes of the Lot-et-Garonne department
