= Saint-Léon, Lot-et-Garonne =

Saint-Léon
- Commune
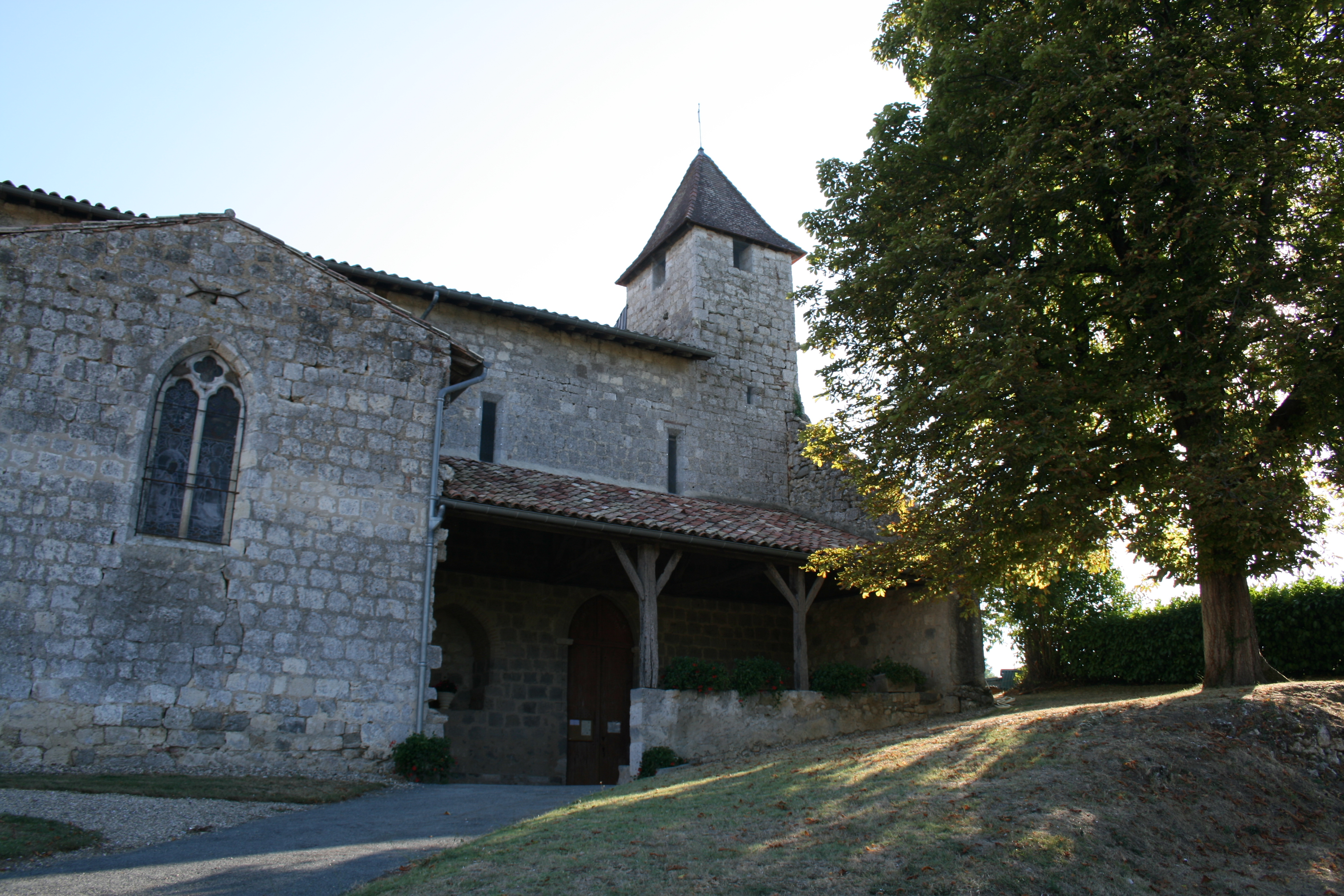
- Saint-Barthélemy Church in Saint-Léon
- Location of Saint-Léon
- Location within France Location within Nouvelle-Aquitaine
- Coordinates: 44°17′36″N 0°14′34″E
- Country: France
- Region: Nouvelle-Aquitaine
- Department: Lot-et-Garonne
- Arrondissement: Nérac
- Canton: Lavardac

Government
  - Mayor (2020–2026): Nathalie Buger
- Area^{1}: 9.6 km^{2} (3.7 sq mi)
- Elevation: 121 m (397 ft)
- Highest elevation: 157 m (515 ft)
- Lowest elevation: 52 m (171 ft)
- Population (2023): 329
  - Density: 34/km^{2} (89/sq mi)
- Time zone: UTC+01:00 (CET)
  - Summer (DST): UTC+02:00 (CEST)
- INSEE/Postal code: 47251 /47160
- ^{1} French Land Register data, which excludes lakes, ponds, glaciers > 1 km^{2} (0.386 sq mi or 247 acres) and river estuaries.

Saint-Léon (French pronunciation: [sɛ̃ leɔ̃]; Gascon: Sent Lèu) is a commune in the Lot-et-Garonne department in south-western France. Administration:

The commune is part of the arrondissement (administrative district) of Nérac, the canton of Lavardac and the Communauté de communes du Confluent et des Coteaux de Prayssas. Local governance is managed by a mayor and a municipal council, which oversees the communal affairs.

== See also ==
- Communes of the Lot-et-Garonne department
