= Nérac =

- Subprefecture and commune
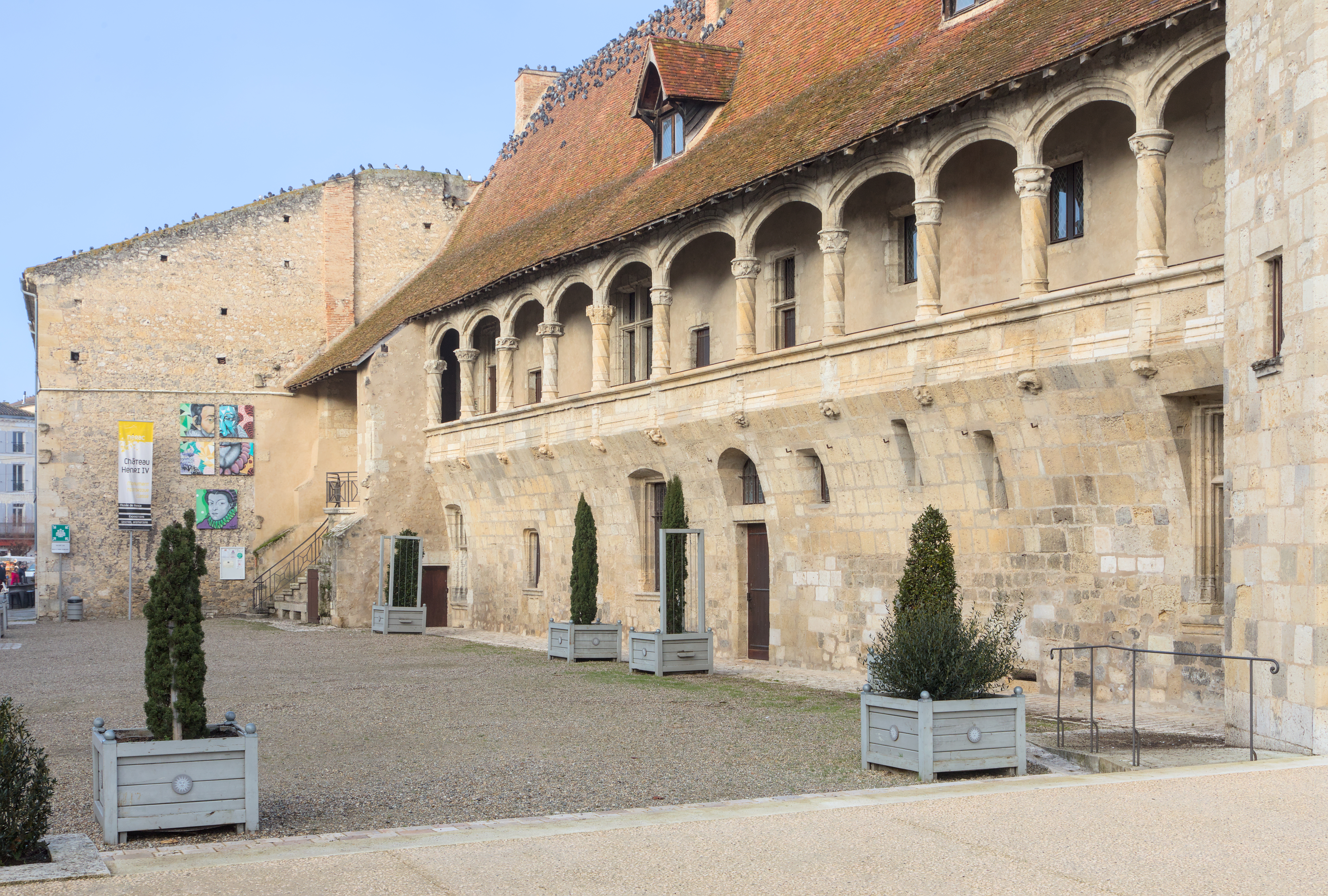
- The castle of Nérac

- Coat of arms
- Location of Nérac
- Location within France Location within Nouvelle-Aquitaine
- Coordinates: 44°08′10″N 0°20′25″E
- Country: France
- Region: Nouvelle-Aquitaine
- Department: Lot-et-Garonne
- Arrondissement: Nérac
- Canton: L'Albret
- Intercommunality: Albret Communauté
- Area^{1}: 62.68 km^{2} (24.20 sq mi)
- Elevation: 71 m (233 ft)
- Highest elevation: 191 m (627 ft)
- Lowest elevation: 38 m (125 ft)
- Population (2023): 6,992
  - Density: 111.6/km^{2} (288.9/sq mi)
- Time zone: UTC+01:00 (CET)
  - Summer (DST): UTC+02:00 (CEST)
- INSEE/Postal code: 47195 /47600
- ^{1} French Land Register data, which excludes lakes, ponds, glaciers > 1 km^{2} (0.386 sq mi or 247 acres) and river estuaries.

Nérac (French pronunciation: [neʁak]; Occitan: Nerac, [neˈɾa]) is a commune in the Lot-et-Garonne department, Southwestern France. The composer and organist Louis Raffy was born in Nérac, as was the former Arsenal and Bordeaux footballer Marouane Chamakh and Admiral Francois Darlan.

== History ==
Nérac appears at the beginning of the 11th century as a possession of the monks of St Pierre de Condom. The lords of Albret gradually deprived them of their authority over the town, and at the beginning of the 14th century founded a castle on the left bank of the Baïse. In the 16th century the castle was the residence of Henry IV during much of his youth and of Marguerite de Navarre, sister of Francis I, of Jeanne d'Albret, and of Margaret of Valois, wife of Henry IV, who held a brilliant court there. Nérac, the inhabitants of which had adopted Calvinism, was seized by the Catholics in 1562. The conferences, held there at the end of 1578 between the Catholics and Protestants, ended in February 1579 in the peace of Nérac. In 1580 the town was used by Henry IV as a base for attacks on Agenais, Armagnac and Guienne. A Chambre de l'Edit for Guienne and a Chambre des Comptes were established there by Henry. In 1621, however, the town took part in the Protestant rising, was taken by the troops of Louis XIII and its fortifications dismantled. Soon after it was deprived both of the Chambre de l'Edit and of the Chambre des Comptes, and its ruin was completed by the revocation of the Edict of Nantes in 1685.

== Geography ==
The town is divided by the Baïse into two parts, Grand-Nérac on the left bank and Petit-Nérac on the right bank. The river is spanned by a bridge of the 16th century, called the Pont Vieux, and by the Pont Neuf, of later construction. Narrow winding streets often bordered by old houses ascend from the narrow quays on both banks. From the left bank a staircase leads to the Rue Henri Quatre, where stands a wing of the castle in which Henry IV lived. A statue of the king stands in one of the squares.

The church of Grand-Nérac of the 18th century and the church of Petit-Nérac of the 19th century offer no remarkable features. On the left bank of the Baïse, above Grand-Nérac, market gardens have taken the place of the old gardens of the Sires d’Albret, but remains of the Palais des Mariannes and of the Pavillon des Bains du Roi de Navarre, both of Renaissance architecture, are left. The promenade of La Garenne laid out by Antoine of Navarre, stretches for more than a mile along the opposite bank of the river. The remains of a Roman villa, including a fragment of mosaic, have been found there.

== Population ==
Historical population
Year	Pop.	±% p.a.
1968	7,061	—
1975	7,156	+0.19%
1982	6,828	−0.67%
1990	7,015	+0.34%
1999	6,787	−0.37%
2007	6,877	+0.16%
2012	7,086	+0.60%
2017	6,827	−0.74%
2023	6,992	+0.40%
Source: INSEE

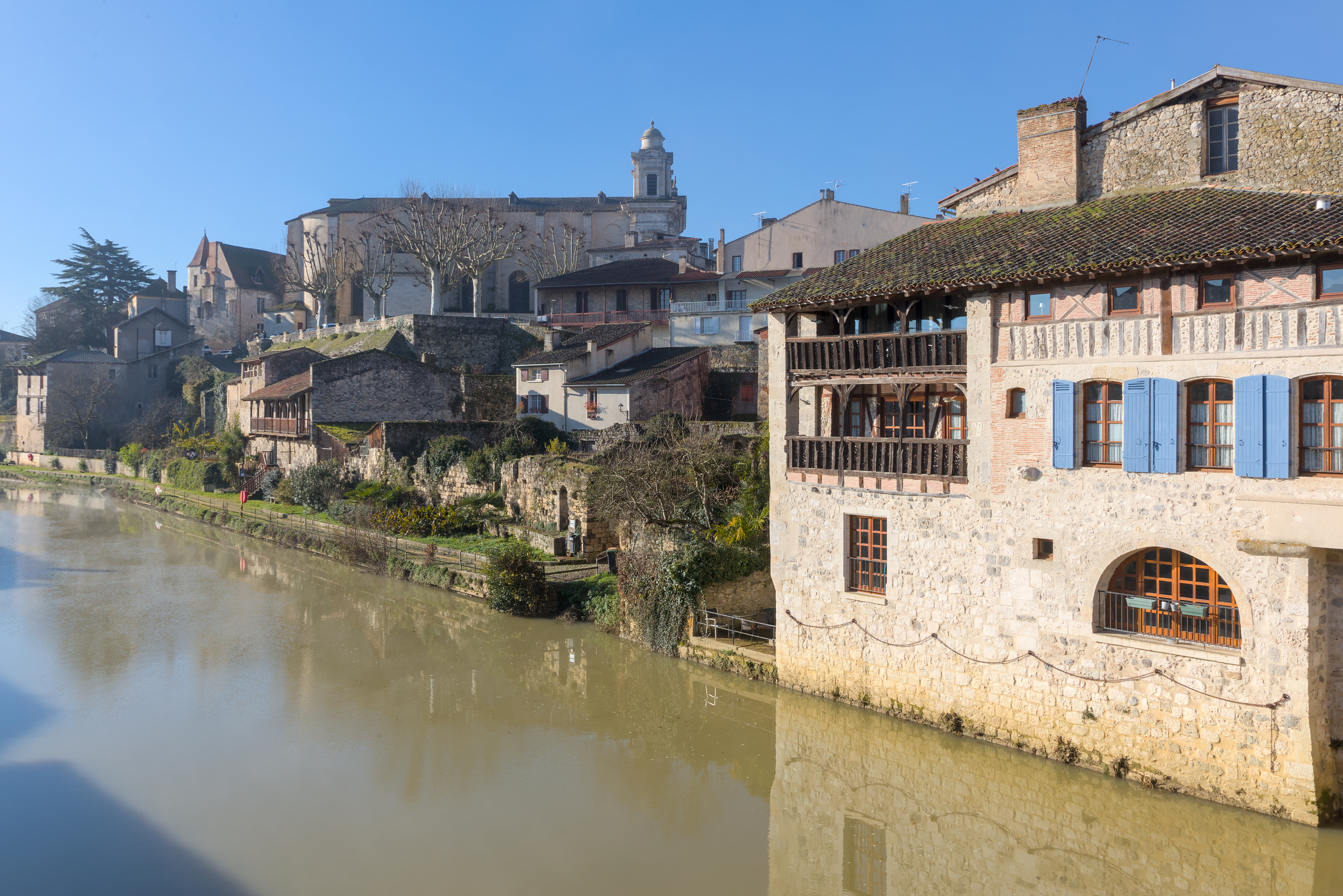
The town center viewed from the Old Bridge.

== In culture ==
Nérac was visited by author Joanne Harris as a child, and was influential in the setting of her best-known novel, Chocolat.

== See also ==
- Communes of the Lot-et-Garonne department
