= Baïse =

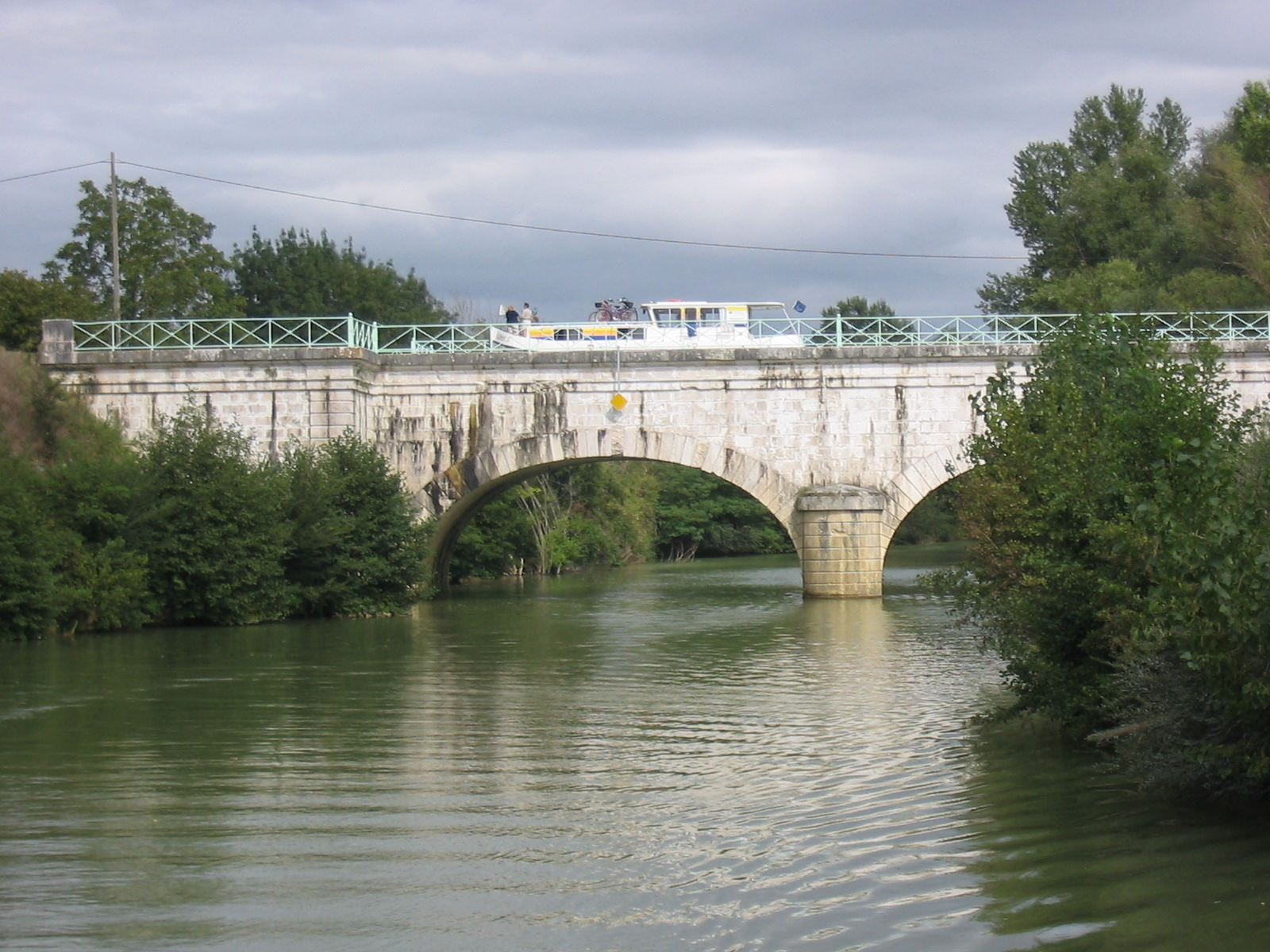
- Canal bridge over the river

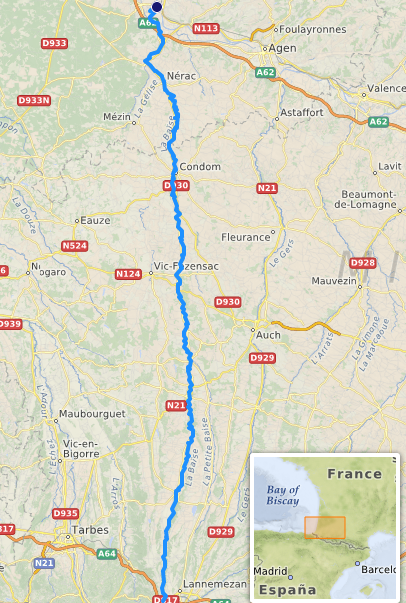
- Native name: La Baïse (French)

Location
- Country: France

Physical characteristics
- Source
  - location: Plateau de Lannemezan
- Mouth
  - location: Garonne
  - coordinates: 44°17′5″N 0°19′17″E
- Length: 188 km (117 mi)
- Basin size: 2,910 km^{2} (1,120 mi^{2})
- Discharge
  - average: 5 m^{3}/s (180 cu ft/s)

Basin features
- Progression: Garonne→ Gironde estuary→ Atlantic Ocean

The Baïse (pronounced [baiːz]; Occitan: Baïsa) is a 188-kilometre (117 mi) long river in south-western France, left tributary of the Garonne. Its source is in the foothills of the Pyrenees, near Lannemezan. It flows north through the following départements and towns:

- Hautes-Pyrénées: Lannemezan, Trie-sur-Baïse
- Gers: Mirande, Castéra-Verduzan, Valence-sur-Baïse, Condom
- Lot-et-Garonne: Nérac, Lavardac

It flows into the Garonne near Aiguillon.

== Tributaries ==
- Gélise (in Lavardac)
  - Osse (in Nérac)
- Petite Baïse (in L'Isle-de-Noé)
