= Siege of Penne d'Agenais =

1212 siege during the Albigensian Crusade

Siege of Penne d'Agenais (1212)
- Part of the Albigensian Crusade
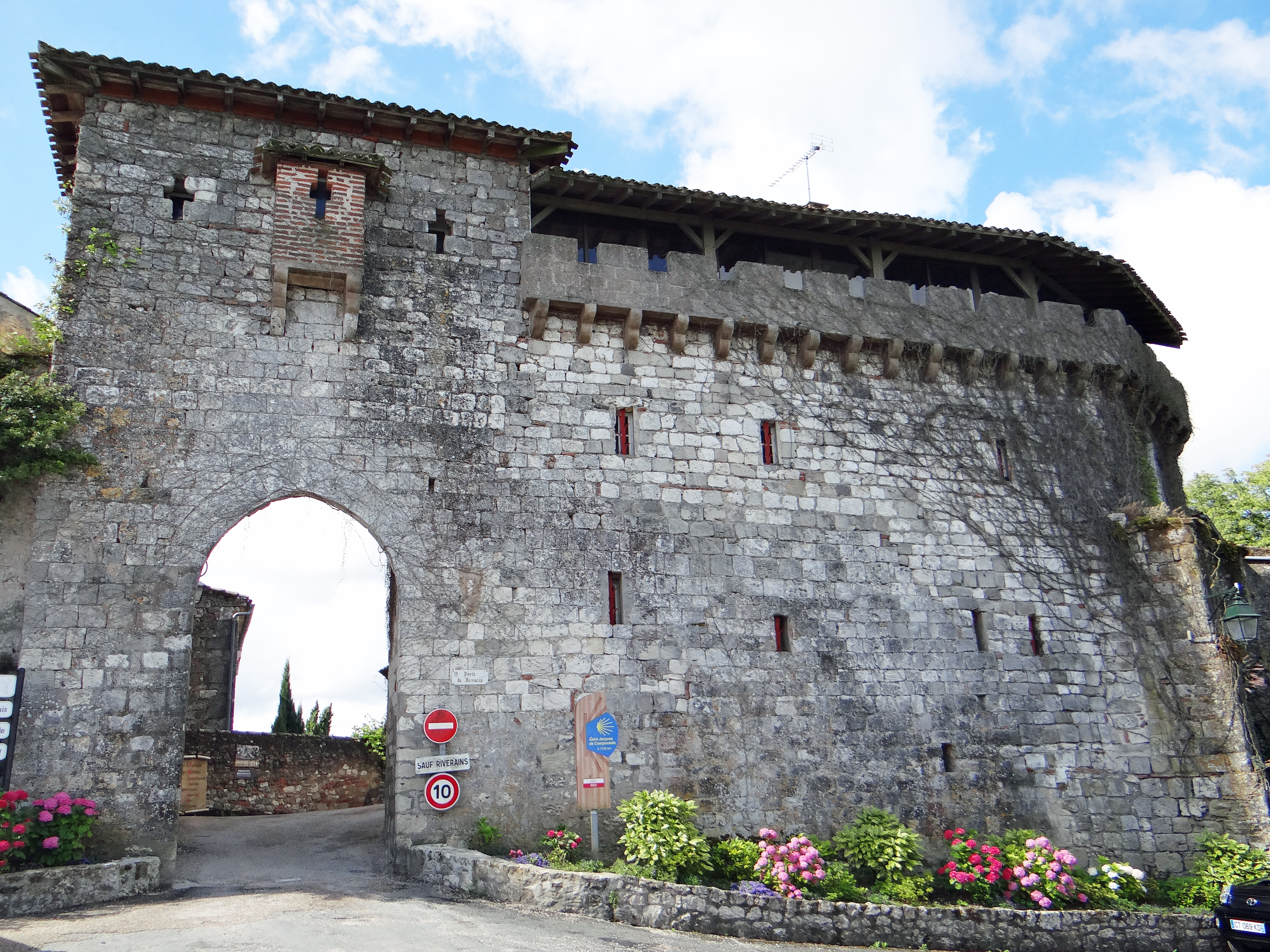
- The Ferracap Gate of Penne d'Agenais
| Date | 3 June – 25 July 1212 |
| Location | Penne-d'Agenais, Agenais |
| Result | Crusader victory |

Belligerents
| Crusaders | Lordship of Penne-d'Agenais |

Commanders and leaders
| Simon de Montfort; Guy de Montfort | Hugh of Alfaro |

Strength
| Very large | 400 |

Casualties and losses
| Minimal | Minimal |

The Siege of Penne d'Agenais was a military engagement during the Albigensian Crusade which took place from June 3rd to July 25th of 1212. It took place in the Agenais region of southern France against the castle of Penne-d'Agenais. The siege was led by the leader of the crusade, Simon de Montfort, against the castellan of Penne-d'Agenais, Hugh of Alfaro. After nearly two months, the defenders negotiated a surrender with the crusader army.

== Background ==
Since the beginning of the crusade, the Agenais had seen relatively little fighting due to its distance from the main areas of combat. It also did not contain a heavy presence of heretics and was not a considered a priority for the crusade. The Agenais had been acquired by Raymond VI, Count of Toulouse, through his marriage to Joan of England in 1196. Since Raymond held the Agenais as a fief from King John of England, an attack on the territory risked war with John. During the campaign of 1211, Simon de Montfort tried and failed to directly invade the County of Toulouse. When Raymond VI took the offensive against the crusaders later in 1211 he was supported by militias from the Agenais. Simon knew that conquering the Agenais would strengthen his own position and weaken Raymond. When the Bishop of Agen invited Simon to take the region from Raymond, he had the excuse he needed to invade.

As the crusaders made their way into the Agenais, many towns and castles either surrendered or were abandoned. The first fortress to resist the crusaders was the castle of Penne-d'Agenais. Penne-d'Agenais was built on a rocky hill high over the Lot River. Its defensive works had been recently modernized by Richard the Lionheart. The castle was located at the top of the hill and was surrounded by an unwalled lower suburb. Due to the steepness of the hill, the castle could only be approached from the south. The lower town was burned down by the defenders to create an unobstructed view from the castle and deny its use by the crusaders.

== Opposing forces ==
The defenders were led by Hugh of Alfaro who was a Navarrese routier, the Seneschal of the Agenais, and son in law to Raymond VI. Hugh was long aware that that the crusaders were coming and was able to prepare in advance. He stocked up on supplies and provisions which included plenty of wood and iron for weapons and repairs. He gathered a garrison of 400 mercenaries and local nobles, expelled the population of the surrounding suburb to preserve supplies, and constructed counter-siege weapons. The castle contained a well, two forges, a bakery, and a windmill to grind grain.

Simon de Montfort, later joined by his brother Guy de Montfort, led the besieging crusaders. The exact size of the crusader army is not known, but at the start of the siege it was considered very large. The army was mostly made up of lightly armed crusader-pilgrims and contained relatively few knights. The overall size and strength of the crusader army changed over the course of the siege. Crusaders who fulfilled their 40 day vows left while fresh reinforcements arrived.

== Siege ==
The crusader army began the siege on June 3rd, 1212 and established their camp within the ruins of the lower town. As the crusaders set up their camp, they were harassed by arrow fire from the garrison. Several days later the crusaders had set up their siege engines and began bombarding the walls. While the stones were able to damage some of the buildings within the walls, they were unable to weaken the walls. Meanwhile the defenders fired back at the crusaders with their own siege weapons.

The crusaders assaulted the walls several times but were driven back due to having few knights and relying on poorly armed pilgrims. The defenders also launched sorties from the castle that harassed the besiegers and threatened their siege engines. The crusaders were unable to make progress and many crusaders began to leave as their forty day service expired. This forced Simon to recall his brother, Guy, who was campaigning to the south around Toulouse with a second army. Guy's army camped to the east of the castle, whereas Simon was camped to the southwest.

The crusaders constructed nine siege engines which kept the castle under constant bombardment. The Archdeacon of Paris, a talented siege engineer, created the largest trebuchet employed by the crusaders at this point in the war. This trebuchet was able to cause significant damage to the walls, keep, and interior buildings. Furthermore, large contingents of knights and pilgrims continued to arrive, bolstering the crusader army.

After seven weeks of siege, the situation for the defenders had become increasingly dire. Their food and water was running out, the crusader siege engines were causing serious damage, and it was becoming clear that Raymond VI would not be coming to relieve them. Hugh began to offer proposals for surrender before the castle could be stormed and their lives forfeit. Surrender was offered under the condition that the garrison be allowed to leave freely with their weapons and armor. Simon, who did not know how much longer the garrison could hold out and knowing that more of his army would eventually leave after their forty days expired, accepted the offer. On July 25th, the garrison of Penne D'Agenais surrendered.

== Bibliography ==
- Marvin, Laurence W. (2008). The Occitan War: A Military and Political History of the Albigensian Crusade, 1209-1218. Cambridge, UK: Cambridge University Press. ISBN 978-0521123655.
- Evans, Austin P (1962). "VIII THE ALBIGENSIAN CRUSADE". In Wolff, Robert Lee; Hazard, Harry W. (eds.). A History of the Crusades, Volume 2: The Later Crusades. University of Pennsylvania Press. pp. 277–324. ISBN 978-1-5128-2023-2. JSTOR j.ctv4s7mwv.17.
- Sumption, Jonathan (1999). The Albigensian Crusade. London, UK: Faber. ISBN 978-0571200023.
- Pegg, Mark Gregory (2008). A Most Holy War: The Albigensian Crusade and the Battle for Christendom. New York, NY: Oxford University Press. ISBN 978-0195171310.
