= Jean-Gérard Lacuée, count of Cessac =

French politician (1752–1841)

Jean-Girard Lacuée
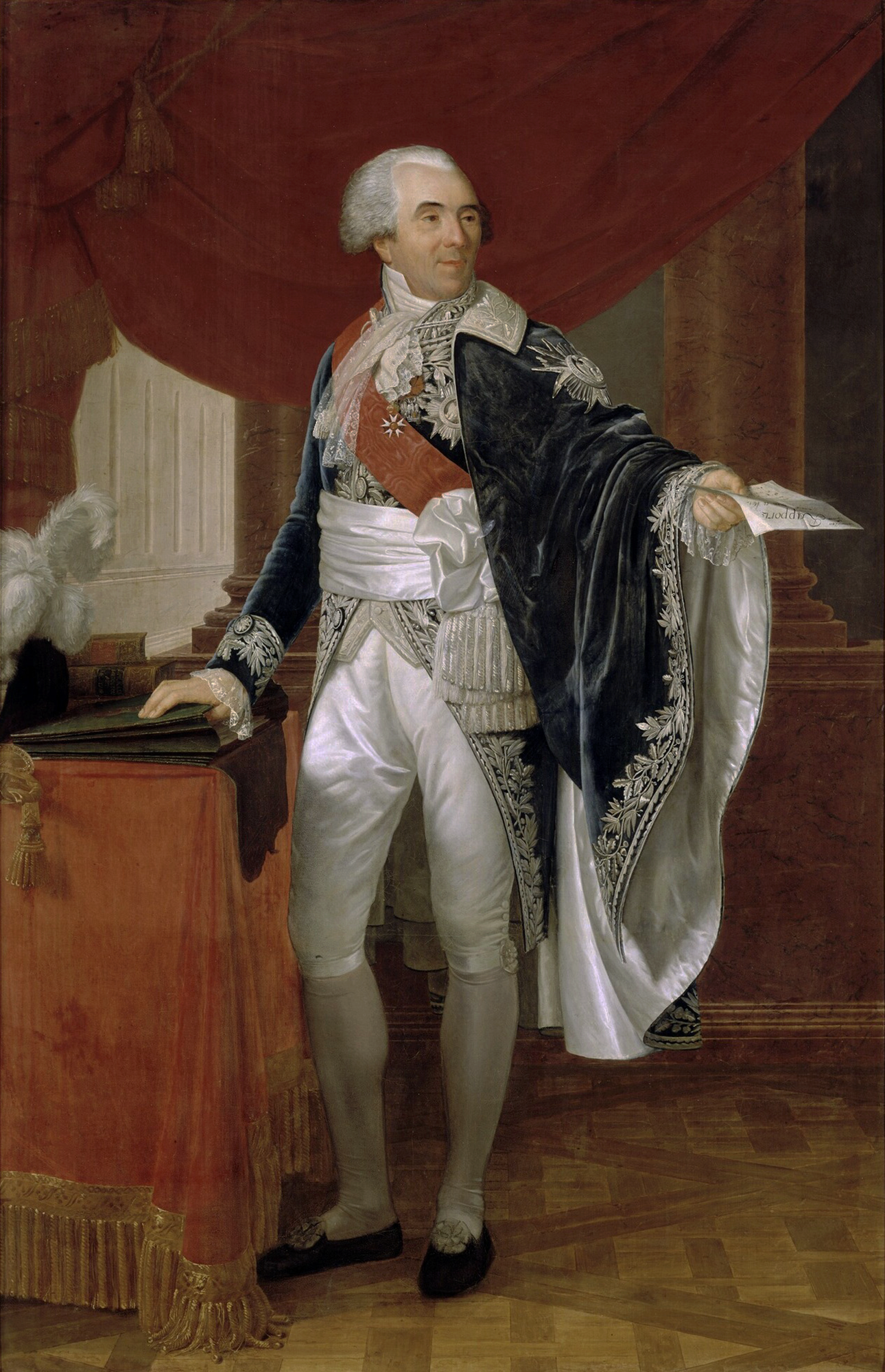
- Born: 4 November 1752; Hautefage-la-Tour, Agenais
- Died: 18 June 1841 (aged 88); Paris
- Military career
- Allegiance: France
- Branch: Cavalry
- Rank: Général de division
- Other work: peer of France

Jean-Girard Lacuée (French pronunciation: [ʒɑ̃ ʒiʁaʁ lakɥe]), count of Cessac (château de Lamassas), near Hautefage-la-Tour in the arrondissement of Agen, 4 November 1752 – Paris, 18 June 1841) was a French general and politician, peer of France and Minister for War under Napoleon I of France. His name is inscribed on the south side (column 18) of the Arc de Triomphe.

== Life ==
Lacuée was born near Agen in 1752. He became a member of the institute, minister of state in 1807, and minister of the administration of war in 1810. He died in 1841.
