= Penne-d'Agenais =

- Commune
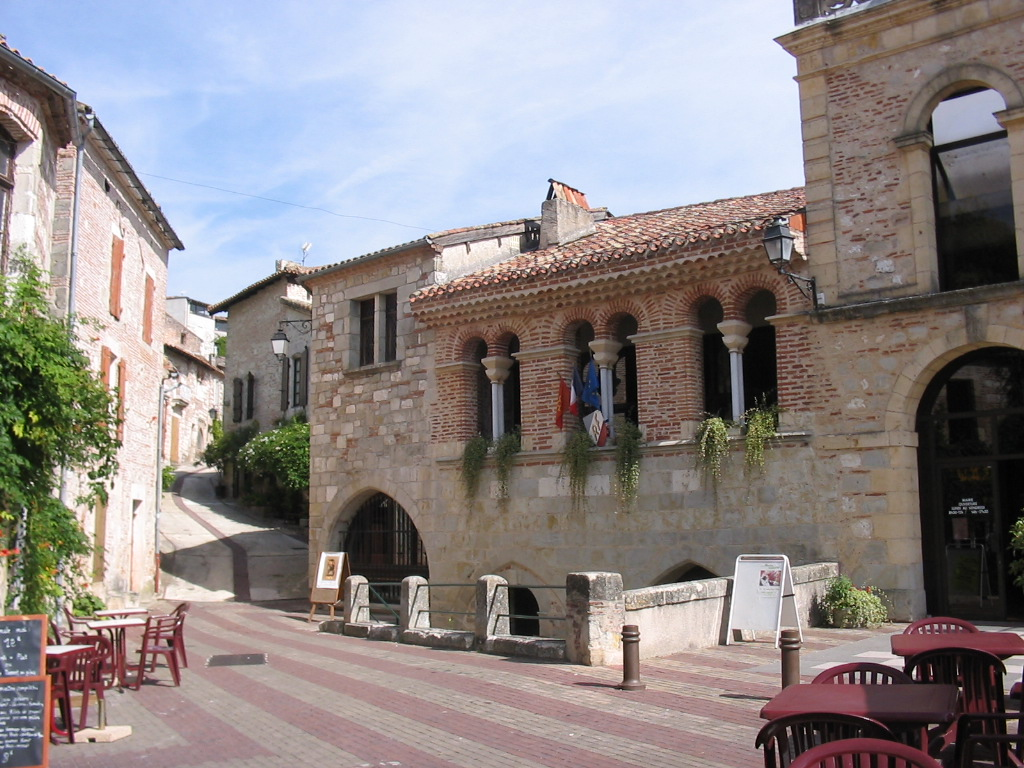
- A view within Penne-d'Agenais

- Coat of arms
- Location of Penne-d'Agenais
- Location within France Location within Nouvelle-Aquitaine
- Coordinates: 44°23′23″N 0°49′11″E
- Country: France
- Region: Nouvelle-Aquitaine
- Department: Lot-et-Garonne
- Arrondissement: Villeneuve-sur-Lot
- Canton: Le Pays de Serres
- Intercommunality: Fumel Vallée du Lot

Government
  - Mayor (2020–2026): Arnaud Devilliers
- Area^{1}: 46.71 km^{2} (18.03 sq mi)
- Elevation: 210 m (690 ft)
- Highest elevation: 231 m (758 ft)
- Lowest elevation: 52 m (171 ft)
- Population (2023): 2,496
  - Density: 53.44/km^{2} (138.4/sq mi)
- Time zone: UTC+01:00 (CET)
  - Summer (DST): UTC+02:00 (CEST)
- INSEE/Postal code: 47203 /47140
- ^{1} French Land Register data, which excludes lakes, ponds, glaciers > 1 km^{2} (0.386 sq mi or 247 acres) and river estuaries.

Penne-d'Agenais (French pronunciation: [pɛn daʒ(ə)nɛ], literally Penne of Agenais; Occitan: Pena d'Agenés Languedocien: Pena d’Agenés) is a commune in the Lot-et-Garonne department in south-western France. It is a member of Les Plus Beaux Villages de France (The Most Beautiful Villages of France) Association. Penne-d'Agenais station has rail connections to Périgueux and Agen.

== History ==
Numerous excavations carried out in and around the village have unearthed the remains of a Gallo-Roman settlement.

Richard the Lionheart fortified the castle of Penne, which became a powerful defensive stronghold, a key to the Duchy of Guyenne according to some medieval texts.

At the beginning of the 13th century, southern France experienced a significant growth in the Cathar religious movement. The desire of the French royal power to extend its dominion over the Midi, combined with a concern for defending Christianity, drew the entire region into a religious war that was also a war of conquest. Frankish power emerged victorious: many properties and castles were confiscated, and the Cathars, completely annihilated, became nothing more than a subject of historical controversy. During the Albigensian Crusade, the Count of Toulouse entrusted Hugh d'Alfaro with the daunting task of driving the crusader knights out of the stronghold of Penne. However, at the beginning of August 1212, after a fifty-day siege, Penne capitulated.

In the aftermath of the Albigensian War, Penne experienced a significant repopulation. Its growing importance then allowed it to demand the establishment of a municipal administration and a charter of customs. It appears that the latter was first established in 1243 before being revised and expanded in 1270. At the end of the Hundred Years' War, King Charles VIII of France granted the inhabitants the renewal of their charter, which had been lost in the fire that ravaged the town in 1373.

In 1154, the accession to the throne of Henry Plantagenet, second husband of Eleanor of Aquitaine, brought the entire province under English rule. Throughout the Hundred Years' War, Penne alternated between French and English control. In 1373, the English burned the town before abandoning it to Bertrand du Guesclin, who had been besieging it for three months.

Established as a Protestant stronghold in the mid-16th century, Penne was the scene of clashes between Catholics and Huguenots. The bloodiest occurred in 1562. After a 99-day siege, Blaise de Montluc, the leader of the Catholic army, seized the town occupied by the Protestants. Some of the defenders were slaughtered and thrown into the castle wells.

It was in the 16th and 17th centuries that the plague ravaged the Penne region. In 1653, in order to stop the epidemic, the inhabitants of Penne pledged to rebuild the church of Notre-Dame de Peyragude and to go there in procession on August 15 each year.

In Penne, the French Revolution brought about economic and social progress that benefited both the common people and the bourgeoisie.

Before 1806, Penne absorbed no less than thirteen ephemeral communes: Allemans, Ladignac, Laval, Magnac, Mondoulens, Port-de-Penne, Sainte-Foy, Saint-Léger, Saint-Marcel, Saint-Martin, Saint-Sylvestre-sur-Lot, Tremons and Trentels. In 1839, the former commune of Trentels regained its independence and expanded its territory by incorporating those of Ladignac (Lot-et-Garonne) and Laval (Lot-et-Garonne). In 1852, Saint-Sylvestre-sur-Lot also became independent.

At the dawn of the 19th century, the commune of Penne had approximately 4,000 inhabitants. It was only in 1919 that the commune adopted the name Penne-d'Agenais.

On 30 May 1944, 1,200 prisoners from the Eysses prison were taken to the Penne-d'Agenais train station for deportation to the Dachau concentration camp. Several were killed by the SS during the march between the Eysses prison and the Penne-d'Agenais train station. A memorial was erected next to the station in remembrance of this deportation.

In the late 1970s, after a century of rural exodus and an aging population, Penne-d'Agenais seemed destined for depopulation, even a slow death. A rescue operation was launched in 1979 under the leadership of a small group of enthusiasts: the mayor, Marcel Garrouste, a historian by training; and an architect-urban planner, Bernard Kaleski, keen to integrate contemporary art into the traditional environment.

== Population ==
Historical population
Year	Pop.	±% p.a.
1968	2,099	—
1975	1,957	−1.00%
1982	2,167	+1.47%
1990	2,394	+1.25%
1999	2,330	−0.30%
2007	2,429	+0.52%
2012	2,358	−0.59%
2017	2,346	−0.10%
2023	2,496	+1.04%
Source: INSEE

== See also ==
- Communes of the Lot-et-Garonne department
