= Casseneuil =

- Commune
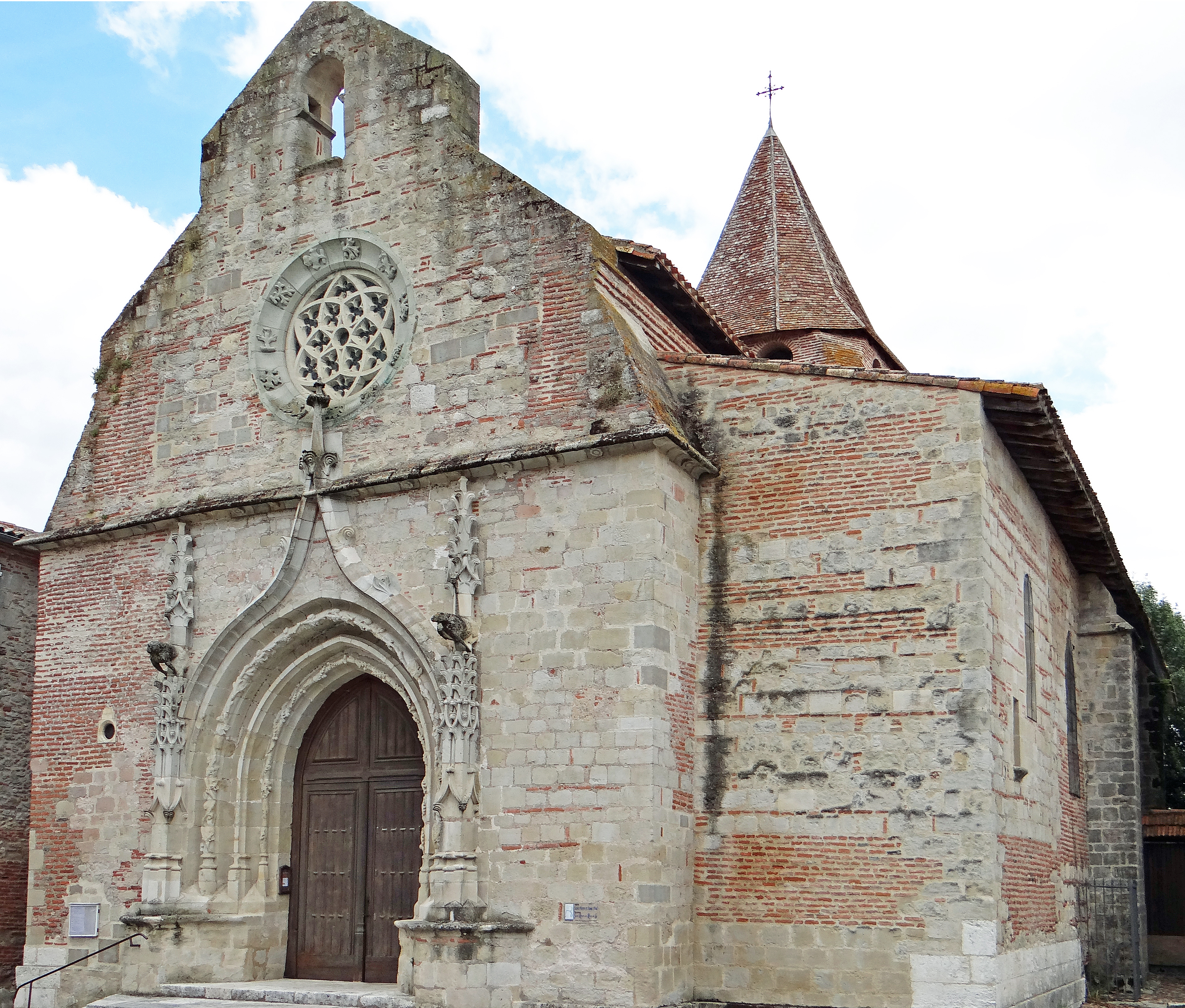
- The church in Casseneuil

- Coat of arms
- Location of Casseneuil
- Location within France Location within Nouvelle-Aquitaine
- Coordinates: 44°26′37″N 0°37′20″E
- Country: France
- Region: Nouvelle-Aquitaine
- Department: Lot-et-Garonne
- Arrondissement: Villeneuve-sur-Lot
- Canton: Le Livradais
- Intercommunality: CA Grand Villeneuvois

Government
  - Mayor (2020–2026): Marie-Laure Grenier
- Area^{1}: 18.09 km^{2} (6.98 sq mi)
- Elevation: 52 m (171 ft)
- Highest elevation: 204 m (669 ft)
- Lowest elevation: 38 m (125 ft)
- Population (2023): 2,348
  - Density: 129.8/km^{2} (336.2/sq mi)
- Time zone: UTC+01:00 (CET)
  - Summer (DST): UTC+02:00 (CEST)
- INSEE/Postal code: 47049 /47440
- ^{1} French Land Register data, which excludes lakes, ponds, glaciers > 1 km^{2} (0.386 sq mi or 247 acres) and river estuaries.

Casseneuil (French pronunciation: [kasnœj]; Occitan: Cassanuèlh) is a commune in the Lot-et-Garonne department in south-western France.

== Sieges of 1209 and 1214 during the Albigensian Crusade ==
In July 1214 Robert de Courçon, the papal legate, awarded the territories of Rodez, Albigeois, Quercy and Agenais in perpetuity to Simon IV de Montfort, who promptly set out with an army from Carcassonne to seize his new fief. Capturing the towns and destroying the castles of the existing lords, he burned the few heretics he found. All who opposed this assault, regardless of their religious beliefs, were his enemies. Many fled to the safety of Casseneuil, which had withstood the siege of 1209. However, in late August Casseneuil itself fell and he awarded Dominic de Guzmán and his preachers at Fanjeaux with the rents due from the town, though it is doubtful if they were able to collect them. His army then moved north to attack Périgord, even though it was not part of his papal grant.

== Population ==
Historical population
Year	Pop.	±% p.a.
1968	2,459	—
1975	2,642	+1.03%
1982	2,684	+0.23%
1990	2,465	−1.06%
1999	2,296	−0.79%
2007	2,377	+0.43%
2012	2,334	−0.36%
2017	2,386	+0.44%
2023	2,348	−0.27%
Source: INSEE

== See also ==
- Communes of the Lot-et-Garonne department
