= Derek Deadman =

English character actor (1940–2014)

- Deadman in Harry Potter and the Philosopher's Stone (2001)
- Born: Derek G. Deadman; 11 March 1940; Fulham, London, England
- Died: 22 November 2014 (aged 74); Frespech, France
- Years active: 1972–2010

Derek Deadman (11 March 1940 – 22 November 2014) was an English character actor who appeared in numerous British films and television series for 38 years.

== Family ==
Born 11 March 1940 in Fulham, London, Derek Deadman was one of the three sons of George and Edith Deadman. Derek had a son, Jake and two grandsons, Luke and Ari.

== Television ==
Deadman appeared on television in minor roles before being cast in a more significant part as Rankin in two episodes of the RAF sitcom Get Some In! in 1975 and 1978. He then played Ringo in 39 of the 66 episodes of the series Never the Twain between 1981 and 1991. He also played the ruthless Sontaran Commander Stor in the Doctor Who serial The Invasion of Time. Also appeared in "The Fall And Rise Of Reginald Perrin" - Series 2 Episode 1 - as the "heavy breather" waiting outside the phone box which Reggie's daughter was calling her mother from.

== Film ==
His many film appearances include roles in The Canterbury Tales (1972), Queen Kong (1976), Jabberwocky (1977), The Glitterball (1977), The Big Sleep (1978), the film version of Porridge (1979), A Nightingale Sang in Berkeley Square (1979), The Apple (1980), Time Bandits (1981), Never Say Never Again (1983), Bullshot (1983), Brazil (1985), National Lampoon's European Vacation (1985), Robin Hood: Prince of Thieves (1991), and the barman of The Leaky Cauldron, Tom, in Harry Potter and the Philosopher's Stone (2001).

== Death ==
Deadman died of complications from diabetes in Frespech, France, where he moved to upon his retirement, in 2014, aged 74.

== Filmography ==
Year	Title	Role	Notes
1972	The Canterbury Tales	The Pardoner	
1972	The Darwin Adventure	Man #2	
1976	Queen Kong	Cockney	Uncredited
1977	Jabberwocky	Apprentice Armourer	
1977	The Glitterball	Ice cream man	Uncredited
1978	The Big Sleep	Customer in Bookshop	
1979	Porridge	Cooper	
1979	A Nightingale Sang in Berkeley Square	Nobby Flowers	
1980	The Apple	Bulldog	
1981	Time Bandits	Robert	
1983	Funny Money	Taxi Driver	
1983	Never Say Never Again	Porter at Shrublands	
1983	Bullshot	Reg Erskine	
1985	Morons from Outer Space	Man in Car	
1985	Brazil	Bill—Dept. of Works	
1985	National Lampoon's European Vacation	Taxi Driver	
1991	Robin Hood: Prince of Thieves	Kneelock	
2000	Honest	Night Watchman	
2001	Crush	Little Crematorium Man	
2001	Harry Potter and the Philosopher's Stone	Tom, Bartender in Leaky Cauldron	
2010	A Goldfish of the Flame	CIA Agent Flynn	(final film role)
