= Sainte-Colombe-de-Villeneuve =

- Commune
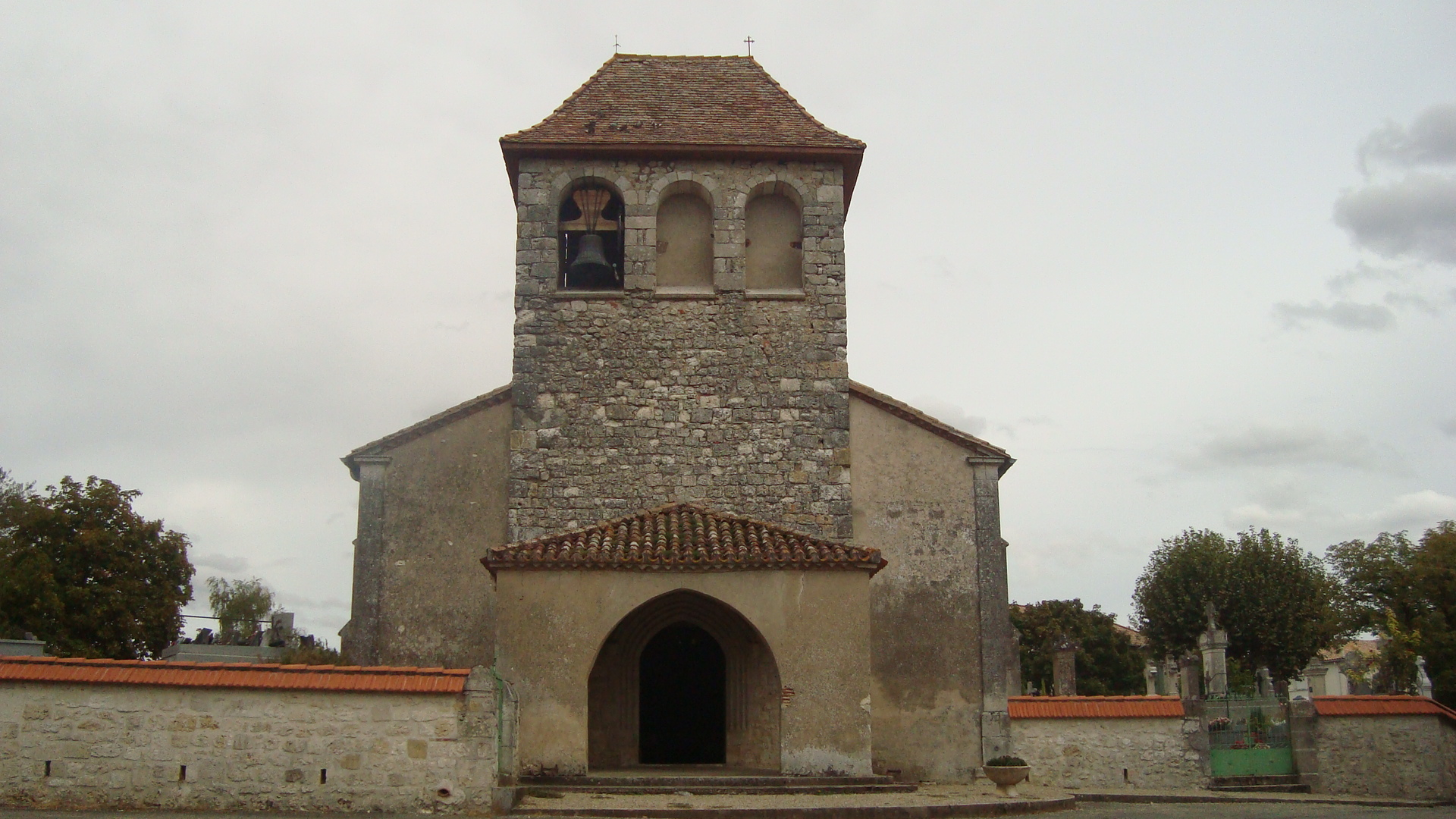
- The church in Sainte-Colombe-De-Villeneuve
- Location of Sainte-Colombe-de-Villeneuve
- Location within France Location within Nouvelle-Aquitaine
- Coordinates: 44°21′38″N 0°39′36″E
- Country: France
- Region: Nouvelle-Aquitaine
- Department: Lot-et-Garonne
- Arrondissement: Villeneuve-sur-Lot
- Canton: Villeneuve-sur-Lot-2
- Intercommunality: CA Grand Villeneuvois

Government
  - Mayor (2020–2026): Michel Bruyere
- Area^{1}: 18.92 km^{2} (7.31 sq mi)
- Elevation: 196 m (643 ft)
- Highest elevation: 224 m (735 ft)
- Lowest elevation: 70 m (230 ft)
- Population (2023): 496
  - Density: 26.2/km^{2} (67.9/sq mi)
- Time zone: UTC+01:00 (CET)
  - Summer (DST): UTC+02:00 (CEST)
- INSEE/Postal code: 47237 /47300
- ^{1} French Land Register data, which excludes lakes, ponds, glaciers > 1 km^{2} (0.386 sq mi or 247 acres) and river estuaries.

Sainte-Colombe-de-Villeneuve (French pronunciation: [sɛ̃t kɔlɔ̃b də vilnœv]; Languedocien: Senta Colomba de Vilanuèva) is a commune in the Lot-et-Garonne department in south-western France.

== See also ==
- Communes of the Lot-et-Garonne department
