= Massoulès =

- Commune
- Location of Massoulès
- Location within France Location within Nouvelle-Aquitaine
- Coordinates: 44°20′24″N 0°52′09″E
- Country: France
- Region: Nouvelle-Aquitaine
- Department: Lot-et-Garonne
- Arrondissement: Villeneuve-sur-Lot
- Canton: Le Pays de Serres
- Intercommunality: Fumel Vallée du Lot

Government
  - Mayor (2020–2026): Philippe Ambroise
- Area^{1}: 7.86 km^{2} (3.03 sq mi)
- Elevation: 215 m (705 ft)
- Highest elevation: 234 m (768 ft)
- Lowest elevation: 117 m (384 ft)
- Population (2023): 194
  - Density: 24.7/km^{2} (63.9/sq mi)
- Time zone: UTC+01:00 (CET)
  - Summer (DST): UTC+02:00 (CEST)
- INSEE/Postal code: 47162 /47140
- ^{1} French Land Register data, which excludes lakes, ponds, glaciers > 1 km^{2} (0.386 sq mi or 247 acres) and river estuaries.

Massoulès (French pronunciation: [masulɛs]; Occitan: Maçolés) is a commune in the Lot-et-Garonne department in south-western France.

== See also ==
- Communes of the Lot-et-Garonne department
