= Communauté d'agglomération du Grand Villeneuvois =

Grand Villeneuvois
- Communauté d'agglomération
- Interactive map of Grand Villeneuvois
- Coordinates: 44°22′N 00°43′E
- Country: France
- Region: Nouvelle-Aquitaine
- Department: Lot-et-Garonne
- No. of communes: {{{nbcomm}}}
- Established: 2011
- Area: 354.9 km^{2} (137.0 sq mi)
- Population (2019): 47,571
  - Density: 134.0/km^{2} (347.2/sq mi)
- Website: www.grand-villeneuvois.fr

Communauté d'agglomération du Grand Villeneuvois is the communauté d'agglomération, an intercommunal structure, centred on the town of Villeneuve-sur-Lot. It is located in the Lot-et-Garonne department, in the Nouvelle-Aquitaine region, southwestern France. Created in 2011, its seat is in Casseneuil. Its area is 354.9 km^{2}. Its population was 47,571 in 2019, of which 21,742 in Villeneuve-sur-Lot proper.

== Composition ==
The communauté d'agglomération consists of the following 19 communes:

1. Allez-et-Cazeneuve
2. Bias
3. Casseneuil
4. Cassignas
5. Castella
6. La Croix-Blanche
7. Dolmayrac
8. Fongrave
9. Hautefage-la-Tour
10. Laroque-Timbaut
11. Lédat
12. Monbalen
13. Pujols
14. Saint-Antoine-de-Ficalba
15. Sainte-Colombe-de-Villeneuve
16. Sainte-Livrade-sur-Lot
17. Saint-Étienne-de-Fougères
18. Saint-Robert
19. Villeneuve-sur-Lot
