= Monbalen =

- Commune
- Coat of arms
- Location of Monbalen
- Location within France Location within Nouvelle-Aquitaine
- Coordinates: 44°18′50″N 0°44′22″E
- Country: France
- Region: Nouvelle-Aquitaine
- Department: Lot-et-Garonne
- Arrondissement: Agen
- Canton: Le Pays de Serres
- Intercommunality: CA Grand Villeneuvois

Government
  - Mayor (2020–2026): Christelle Testet-Prellon
- Area^{1}: 13 km^{2} (5.0 sq mi)
- Elevation: 200 m (660 ft)
- Highest elevation: 230 m (750 ft)
- Lowest elevation: 93 m (305 ft)
- Population (2023): 451
  - Density: 35/km^{2} (90/sq mi)
- Time zone: UTC+01:00 (CET)
  - Summer (DST): UTC+02:00 (CEST)
- INSEE/Postal code: 47171 /47340
- ^{1} French Land Register data, which excludes lakes, ponds, glaciers > 1 km^{2} (0.386 sq mi or 247 acres) and river estuaries.

Monbalen is a commune in the Lot-et-Garonne department in south-western France.

== See also ==
- Communes of the Lot-et-Garonne department
