= Bias, Lot-et-Garonne =

Bias
- Commune
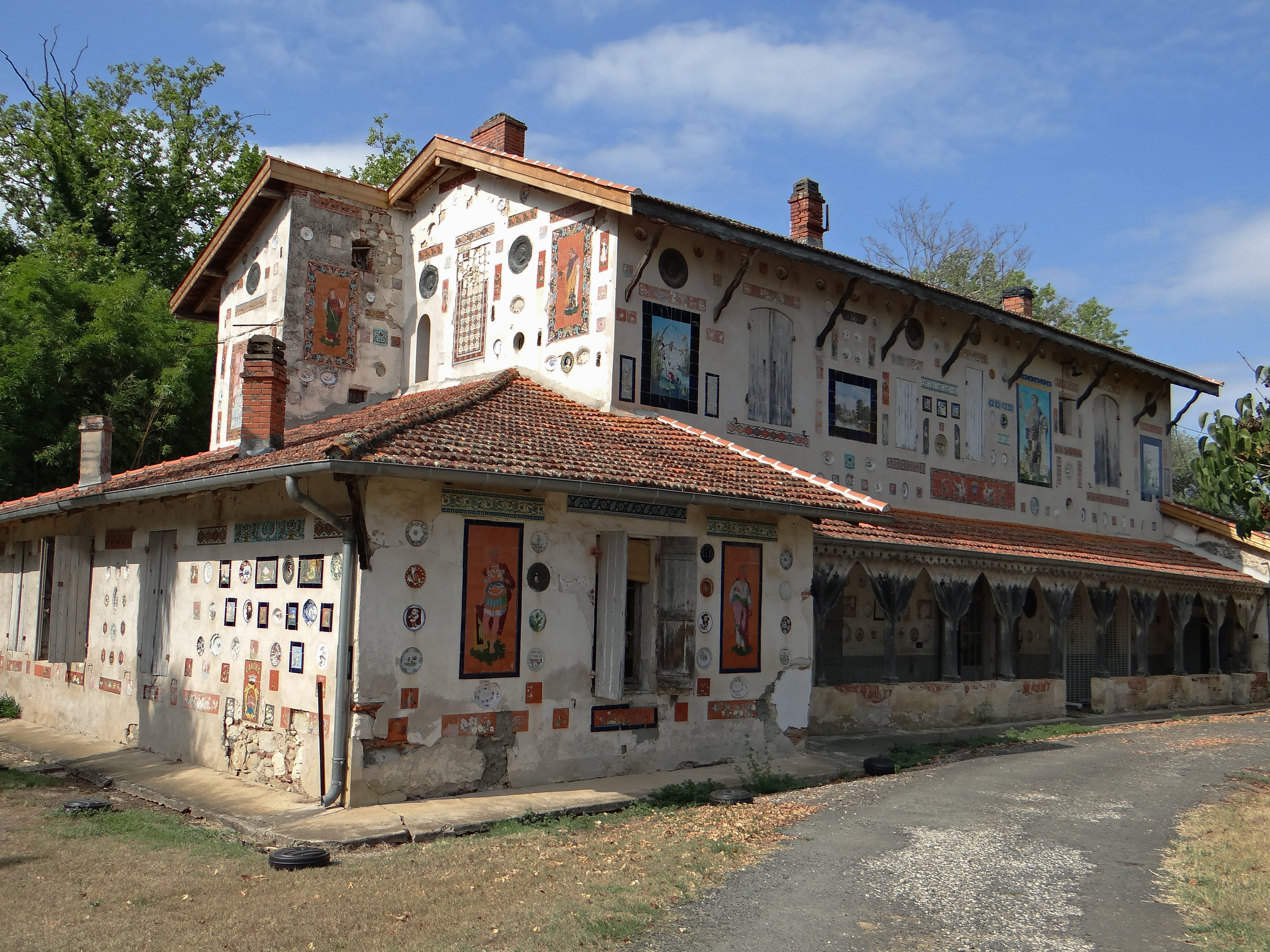
- Domaine de Senelles

- Coat of arms
- Location of Bias
- Location within France Location within Nouvelle-Aquitaine
- Coordinates: 44°25′02″N 0°40′12″E
- Country: France
- Region: Nouvelle-Aquitaine
- Department: Lot-et-Garonne
- Arrondissement: Villeneuve-sur-Lot
- Canton: Villeneuve-sur-Lot-2
- Intercommunality: CA Grand Villeneuvois

Government
  - Mayor (2023–2026): Xavier Llopis
- Area^{1}: 12.29 km^{2} (4.75 sq mi)
- Elevation: 60 m (200 ft)
- Highest elevation: 76 m (249 ft)
- Lowest elevation: 42 m (138 ft)
- Population (2023): 2,977
  - Density: 242.2/km^{2} (627.4/sq mi)
- Time zone: UTC+01:00 (CET)
  - Summer (DST): UTC+02:00 (CEST)
- INSEE/Postal code: 47027 /47300
- ^{1} French Land Register data, which excludes lakes, ponds, glaciers > 1 km^{2} (0.386 sq mi or 247 acres) and river estuaries.

Bias (French pronunciation: [bjas]; Occitan: Biàs) is a commune in the Lot-et-Garonne department in southwestern France. The commune was created in 1935 from part of Villeneuve-sur-Lot.

== Population ==
Historical population

| Year | Pop. | ±% p.a. |
|---|---|---|
| 1936 | 744 | — |
| 1946 | 1,269 | +5.48% |
| 1954 | 952 | −3.53% |
| 1962 | 1,146 | +2.35% |
| 1968 | 2,483 | +13.75% |
| 1975 | 2,601 | +0.67% |
| 1982 | 2,600 | −0.01% |

| Year | Pop. | ±% p.a. |
|---|---|---|
| 1990 | 3,032 | +1.94% |
| 1999 | 2,955 | −0.29% |
| 2007 | 3,169 | +0.88% |
| 2012 | 3,146 | −0.15% |
| 2017 | 3,031 | −0.74% |
| 2023 | 2,977 | −0.30% |

Source: EHESS and INSEE (1968-2023)

== See also ==
- Communes of the Lot-et-Garonne department
