= Canton of Villeneuve-sur-Lot-2 =

Coordinates: 44.40°N 0.70°E

The canton of Villeneuve-sur-Lot-2 is an administrative division of the Lot-et-Garonne department, southwestern France. It was created at the French canton reorganisation which came into effect in March 2015. Its seat is in Villeneuve-sur-Lot.

It consists of the following communes:

1. Bias
2. Hautefage-la-Tour
3. Pujols
4. Saint-Antoine-de-Ficalba
5. Sainte-Colombe-de-Villeneuve
6. Villeneuve-sur-Lot (partly)
