= La Croix-Blanche =

- Commune
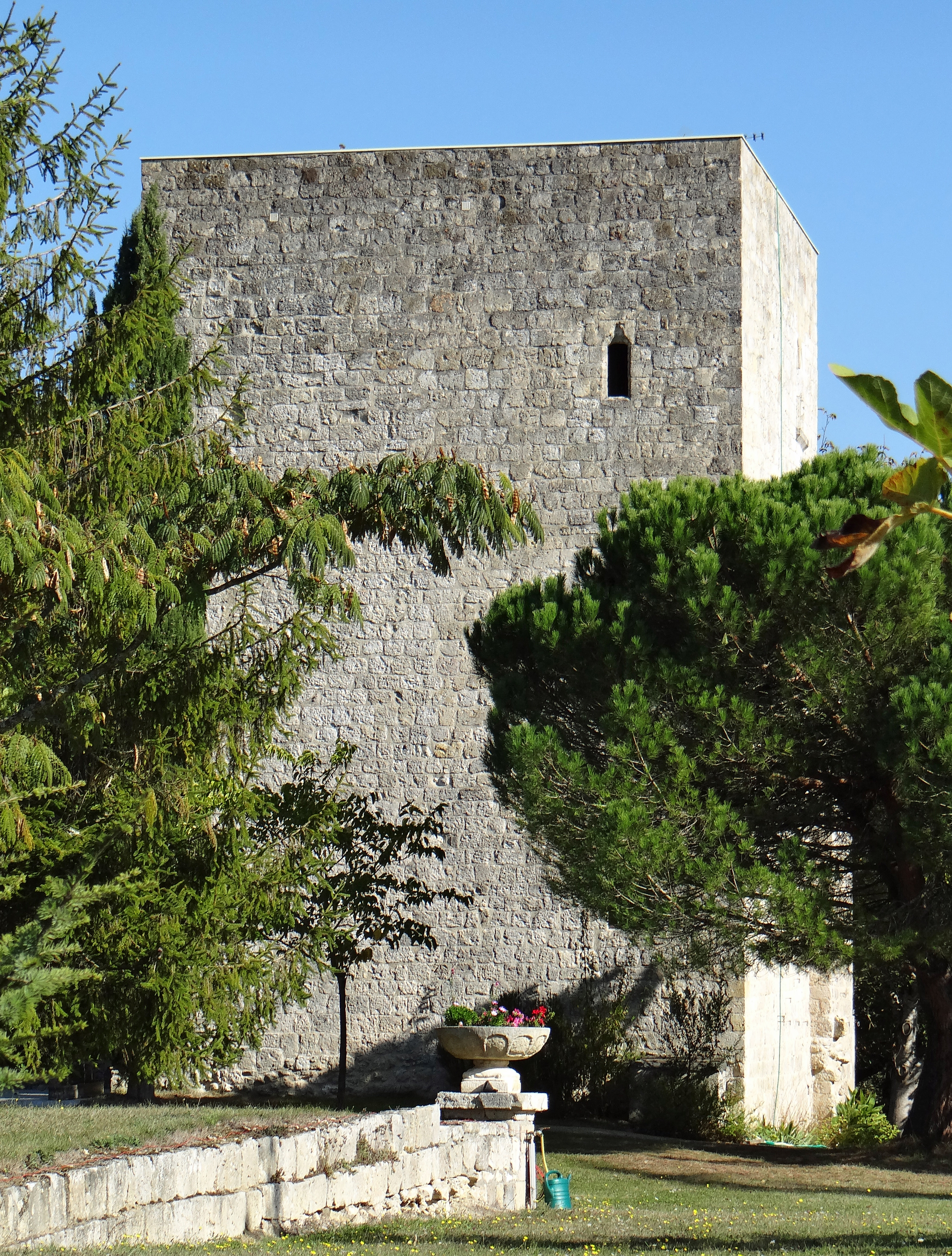
- The keep in La Croix-Blanche

- Coat of arms
- Location of La Croix-Blanche
- Location within France Location within Nouvelle-Aquitaine
- Coordinates: 44°17′45″N 0°41′38″E
- Country: France
- Region: Nouvelle-Aquitaine
- Department: Lot-et-Garonne
- Arrondissement: Agen
- Canton: Le Pays de Serres
- Intercommunality: CA Grand Villeneuvois

Government
  - Mayor (2020–2026): Gilles Charollais
- Area^{1}: 13.05 km^{2} (5.04 sq mi)
- Elevation: 204 m (669 ft)
- Highest elevation: 236 m (774 ft)
- Lowest elevation: 97 m (318 ft)
- Population (2023): 1,075
  - Density: 82.38/km^{2} (213.4/sq mi)
- Time zone: UTC+01:00 (CET)
  - Summer (DST): UTC+02:00 (CEST)
- INSEE/Postal code: 47075 /47340
- ^{1} French Land Register data, which excludes lakes, ponds, glaciers > 1 km^{2} (0.386 sq mi or 247 acres) and river estuaries.

La Croix-Blanche (French pronunciation: [la kʁwa blɑ̃ʃ], literally The White Cross; Occitan: La Crotz Blanca) is a commune in the Lot-et-Garonne department in south-western France.

== See also ==
- Communes of the Lot-et-Garonne department
