= Canton of Le Pays de Serres =

Coordinates: 44.39°N 0.82°E

The canton of Le Pays de Serres is an administrative division of the Lot-et-Garonne department, southwestern France. It was created at the French canton reorganisation which came into effect in March 2015. Its seat is in Penne-d'Agenais.

It consists of the following communes:

1. Auradou
2. Beauville
3. Blaymont
4. Cassignas
5. Castella
6. Cauzac
7. La Croix-Blanche
8. Dausse
9. Dondas
10. Engayrac
11. Frespech
12. Laroque-Timbaut
13. Massels
14. Massoulès
15. Monbalen
16. Penne-d'Agenais
17. Saint-Martin-de-Beauville
18. Saint-Maurin
19. Saint-Robert
20. Saint-Sylvestre-sur-Lot
21. La Sauvetat-de-Savères
22. Tayrac
23. Trémons
