= Canton of Villeneuve-sur-Lot-1 =

Coordinates: 44.41°N 0.71°E

The canton of Villeneuve-sur-Lot-1 is an administrative division of the Lot-et-Garonne department, southwestern France. It was created at the French canton reorganisation which came into effect in March 2015. Its seat is in Villeneuve-sur-Lot.

It consists of the following communes:

1. Lédat
2. Villeneuve-sur-Lot (partly)
