= Pujols, Lot-et-Garonne =

Pujols
- Commune
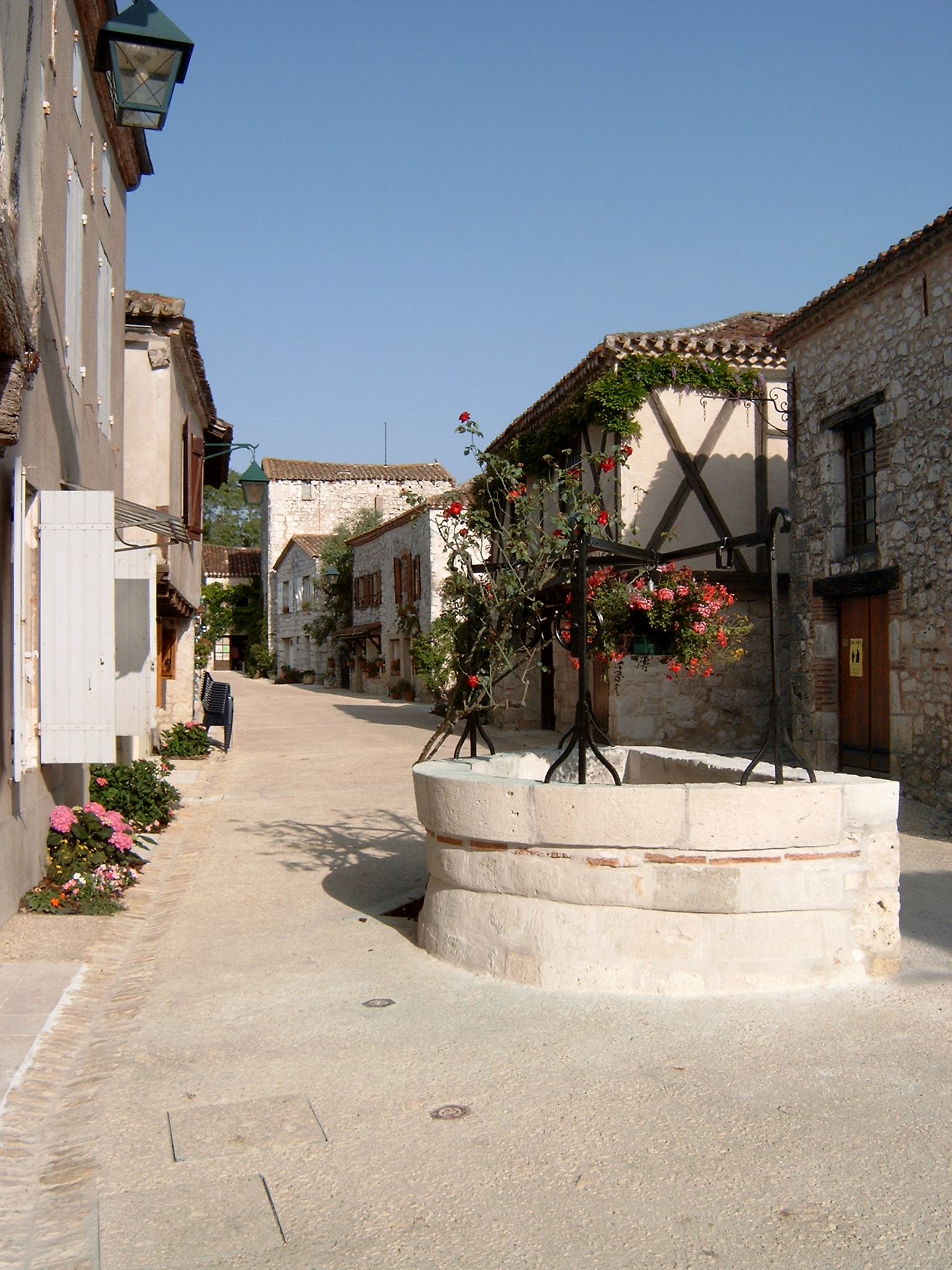
- The main street in Pujols

- Coat of arms
- Location of Pujols
- Location within France Location within Nouvelle-Aquitaine
- Coordinates: 44°23′11″N 0°41′21″E
- Country: France
- Region: Nouvelle-Aquitaine
- Department: Lot-et-Garonne
- Arrondissement: Villeneuve-sur-Lot
- Canton: Villeneuve-sur-Lot-2
- Intercommunality: CA Grand Villeneuvois

Government
  - Mayor (2020–2026): Yvon Ventadoux
- Area^{1}: 24.98 km^{2} (9.64 sq mi)
- Elevation: 188 m (617 ft)
- Highest elevation: 211 m (692 ft)
- Lowest elevation: 65 m (213 ft)
- Population (2023): 3,769
  - Density: 150.9/km^{2} (390.8/sq mi)
- Time zone: UTC+01:00 (CET)
  - Summer (DST): UTC+02:00 (CEST)
- INSEE/Postal code: 47215 /47300
- ^{1} French Land Register data, which excludes lakes, ponds, glaciers > 1 km^{2} (0.386 sq mi or 247 acres) and river estuaries.

Pujols (French pronunciation: [pyʒɔl]; Occitan: Pujòls) is a commune in the Lot-et-Garonne department in south-western France. Its village of Pujols-le-Haut is a member of Les Plus Beaux Villages de France (The Most Beautiful Villages of France) Association.

== Geography ==
=== Location ===
This once fortified town lies within the municipal community of Greater Villeneuve and overlooks the Lot valley and the city of Villeneuve-sur-Lot.

Pujols is located about 19 miles (30 km) north of Agen and halfway between Bordeaux and Toulouse (about 93 miles, or 150 km, from each).

=== Hydrography ===
The Masse, a tributary of the Lot, flows through the municipality.

=== Transportation ===
The route nationale 21 (N21) runs through the town.

=== Town Planning ===
Pujols stretches along an outcrop, and a castle once occupied the western extremity of the town, on the side of the plateau.

A passage under the bell tower of Saint Nicholas Church allows access to the old town center, which is still nestled among the remains of the town's thirteenth century ramparts.

Pujols developed as a fortified town with a castle, a collegiate church, and a covered marketplace. It is currently a member of the organization The Most Beautiful Towns in France, registered under the name “Pujols le Haut” (Upper Pujols).

== History ==
The town of Pujols was built on an outcrop atop a steep incline, overlooking the Lot and Masse river valleys. The Abbot Gerbeau, relying on the toponym “At the Palace” (Au Palai) in the town cadaster of 1811, claimed that a palace dating to the High Middle Ages once occupied the western extremity of the outcrop. Pujols seems to have been relatively important at the beginning of the thirteenth century. The city walls were razed however during the Albigensian Crusade in 1229. According to the account of the royal steward of Agenais, Villefavreuse, the town seems to have been rebuilt with difficulty and only partially, while the fortified town of Villeneuve grew in the 1250s due to the arrival of Pujolais chased from Pujols. Sometime in the late thirteenth or early fourteenth century, the village was fortified with large square slabs of stone, though today there remain only the bell tower gate and the gate of the city (known as the English gate). In 1525, Jean de Pujols and his wife established a chapter of cannons, and built Saint Nicholas Church on the northern side of the town. Towards the beginning of the sixteenth century, the rural Saint-Foy Church was rebuilt within the town's fortifications. The houses of the sixteenth century were made with stone in half-timbered style.

== Population ==
Historical population
Year	Pop.	±% p.a.
1968	1,467	—
1975	2,534	+8.12%
1982	3,365	+4.14%
1990	3,608	+0.88%
1999	3,546	−0.19%
2007	3,672	+0.44%
2012	3,608	−0.35%
2017	3,635	+0.15%
2023	3,769	+0.61%
Source: INSEE

== Culture ==
Pujols is a member of the organization The Most Beautiful Towns in France. Located in the countryside, Pujols is a calm and peaceful town, yet it is nonetheless a vibrant and pleasant place to live, with many cultural and athletic activities. Pujols also has a municipal pool (the pool of Malbentre), located on Malbentre Street, which complements the municipality's athletic and leisure activities, as well as those of the municipal community of Greater Villeneuve. In addition, Pujols opened the Museum of Traditional Toys on 28 June 2015, where it is possible to look at and play with several hundred traditional toys.

=== Education and youth ===
Pujols runs a municipal daycare center known as the “3 P'tits Tours” (3 Li'l Towers), which welcomes children from two and a half months to four years old.

The Welcome Center for Parents and Children (LAPE) is a free space for parents, grandparents, and children under the age of six, as well as expectant parents. This space provides a place to exchange ideas, to meet early childhood specialists, to participate in workshops, to prepare children for their first year of nursery or preschool, and to foster playtime among children. It is open one Wednesday every month.

The school “Petit Tour-Georges Gruelles” includes a preschool with four different classes and a primary school with nine classes ranging from first to fifth grade. Pujols also provides a daycare program for students and parents, which is open in the morning from 7:00 a.m. until 8:50 a.m., and in the evening from 5:00 p.m. until 7:00 p.m. It is a place where children can transition from family to school, as well as a space for games and socializing.

Because Pujols is part of the municipal community of Greater Villeneuve, the children of Pujols between the ages of three and eleven can take advantage of the recreation centers in Monbalen and Fongrave. On Wednesdays and during school vacations, the intermunicipal recreation centers in Monbalen and Fongrave are open to Pujolais children, as well as to children of other municipalities within the municipal community of Greater Villeneuve.

== Sights and monuments ==
- The Church of Saint Nicholas – formerly a collegiate church, dating to the fourteenth century.
- The Church of Saint-Foy – registered as a historical monument in 1903.
- The Church of Saint Étienne – registered as a historical monument in 1996.
- Monument to the Fallen – designed by the architect Villefranche-sur-Lot Gaston Rapin in 1922 and sculpted by Antoine Bourlange.
- House on Citadel Street – A house dating back to the sixteenth century and located near the English gate.
- House on Citadel Street – A house dating back to the sixteenth century and located near Saint Nicholas place.
- Fortified castle of Pujols – A fortified military camp was mentioned in 1259. The castle was rebuilt towards the end of the Middle Ages on top of the most vulnerable part of the site, facing the current location of the town hall. It was a rectangular building equipped with one tower on each corner. The castle was demolished in 1829. Some of its stones were used to construct the prison of Elysses. The remains of the walls and the base of the northeast tower are still visible today.
- The Priory of Saint Christopher of Cambes – According to the Abbot Gerbeau, the priory was at one time subject to the Abbey of La Chaise-Dieu. The apse of the church is thought to date back to the end of the twelfth century or the beginning of the thirteenth century. The nave and the church gate were rebuilt in the sixteenth century. The other buildings of the priory were located north of the church, around a courtyard. In 1551, the living quarters were deemed uninhabitable It was rebuilt sometime during the eighteenth and nineteenth centuries.
- The Church of Saint Pierre-ès-Liens of Doumillac – This church, mentioned in 1271, was rebuilt sometime at the end of the fifteenth century or the beginning of the sixteenth century. It was originally dedicated to Our Lady, then to Saint Pierre in 1520. The bell tower was rebuilt in 1831. The vaulted ceiling of the nave, the side chapels, and the roofing were all redone in 1882 by the architect Adolphe Gilles.
- The Church of Saint-Martin of Noaillac – This church, mentioned as early as 1271, was rebuilt in the first half of the sixteenth century. The two chapels built on both sides of the nave in the sixteenth century form a transept. The church was fortified during the Wars of Religion. Three chapels were added to the sides of the church in the beginning of the seventeenth century. A sacristy was constructed in 1716. The church was repaired during the 1880s.
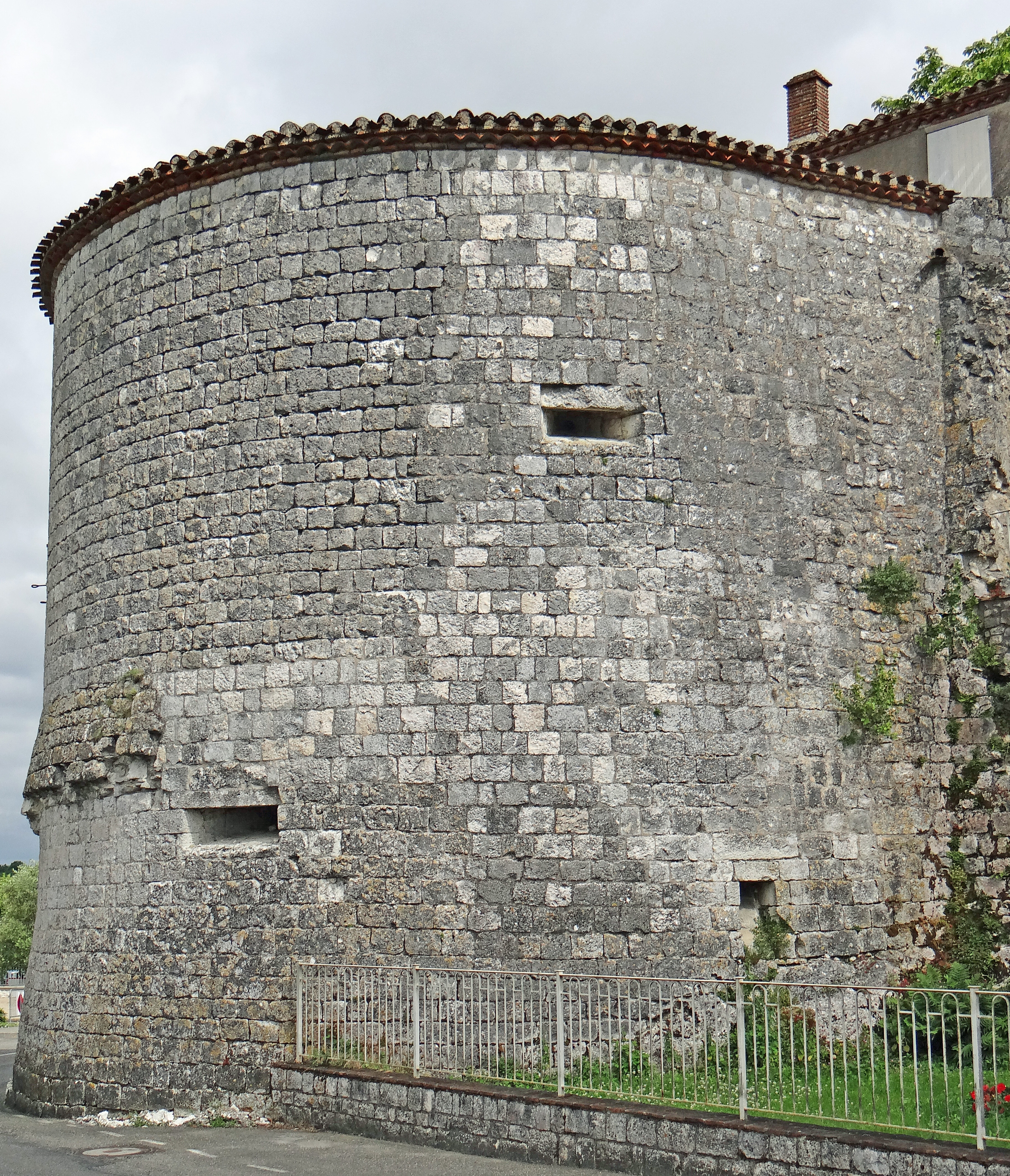
Northeast tower, a vestige of the fortified castle.

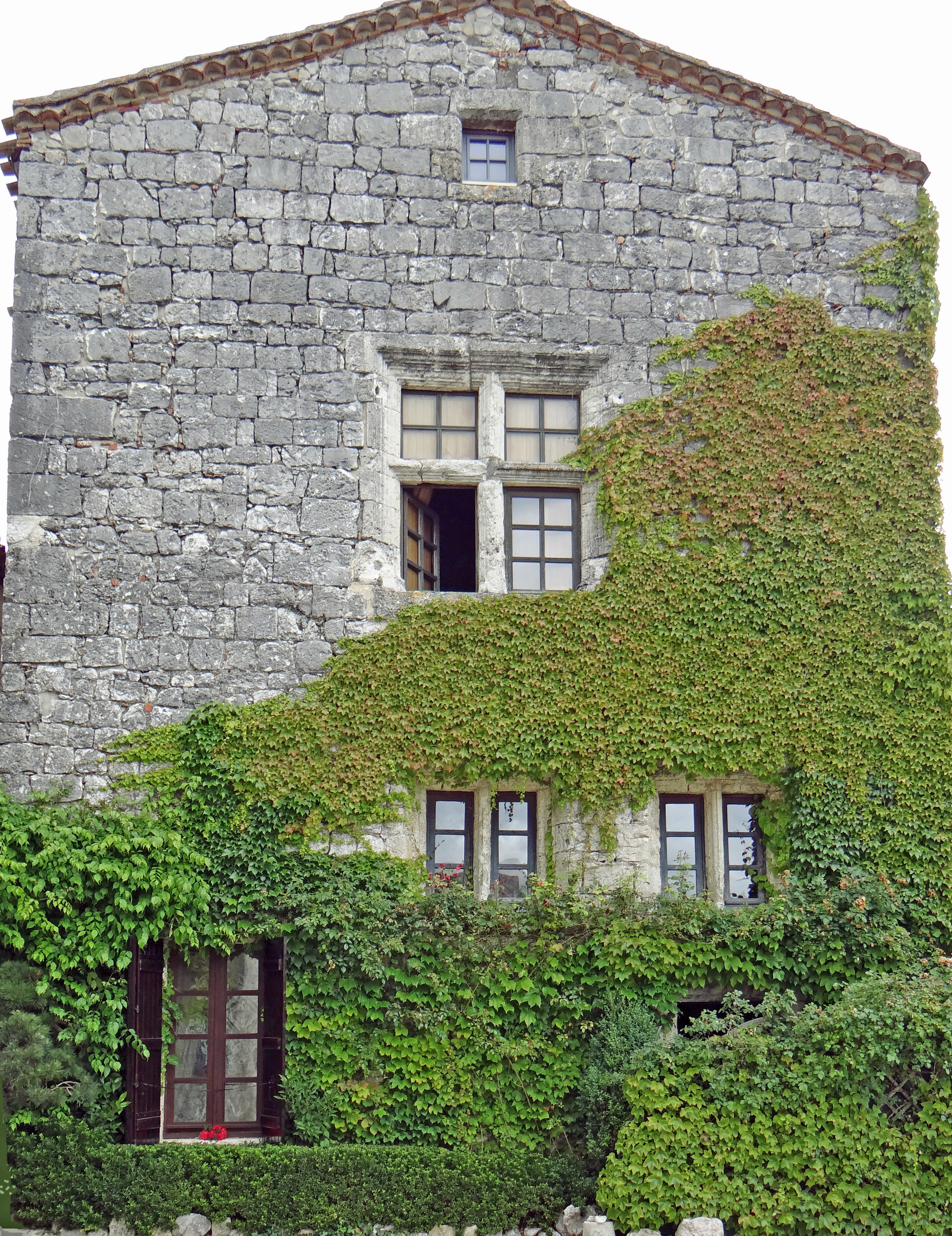
Sixteenth century house, located on Citadel Street, near the English gate.

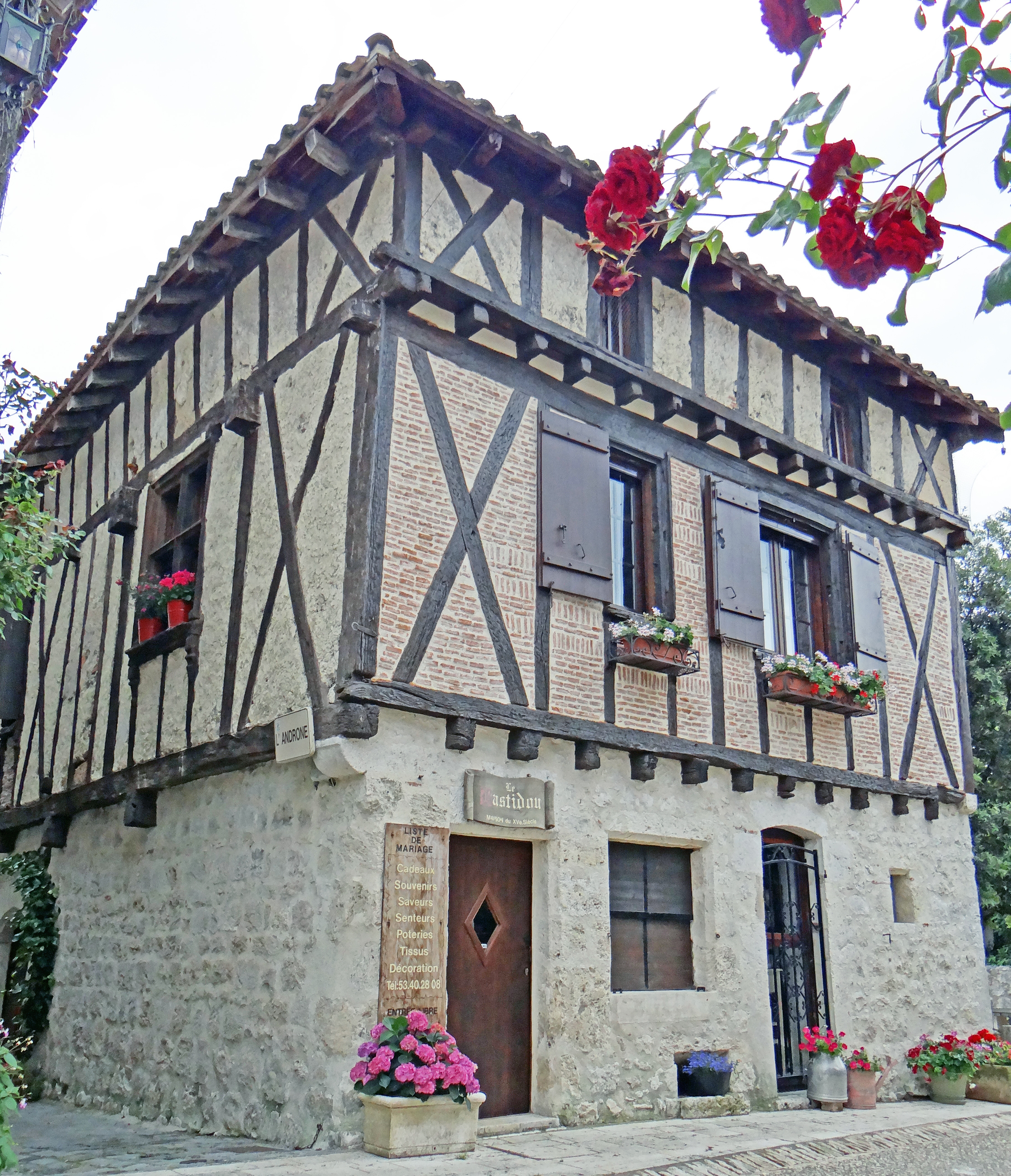
Sixteenth century house, located on Citadel Street, near Saint Nicholas place.

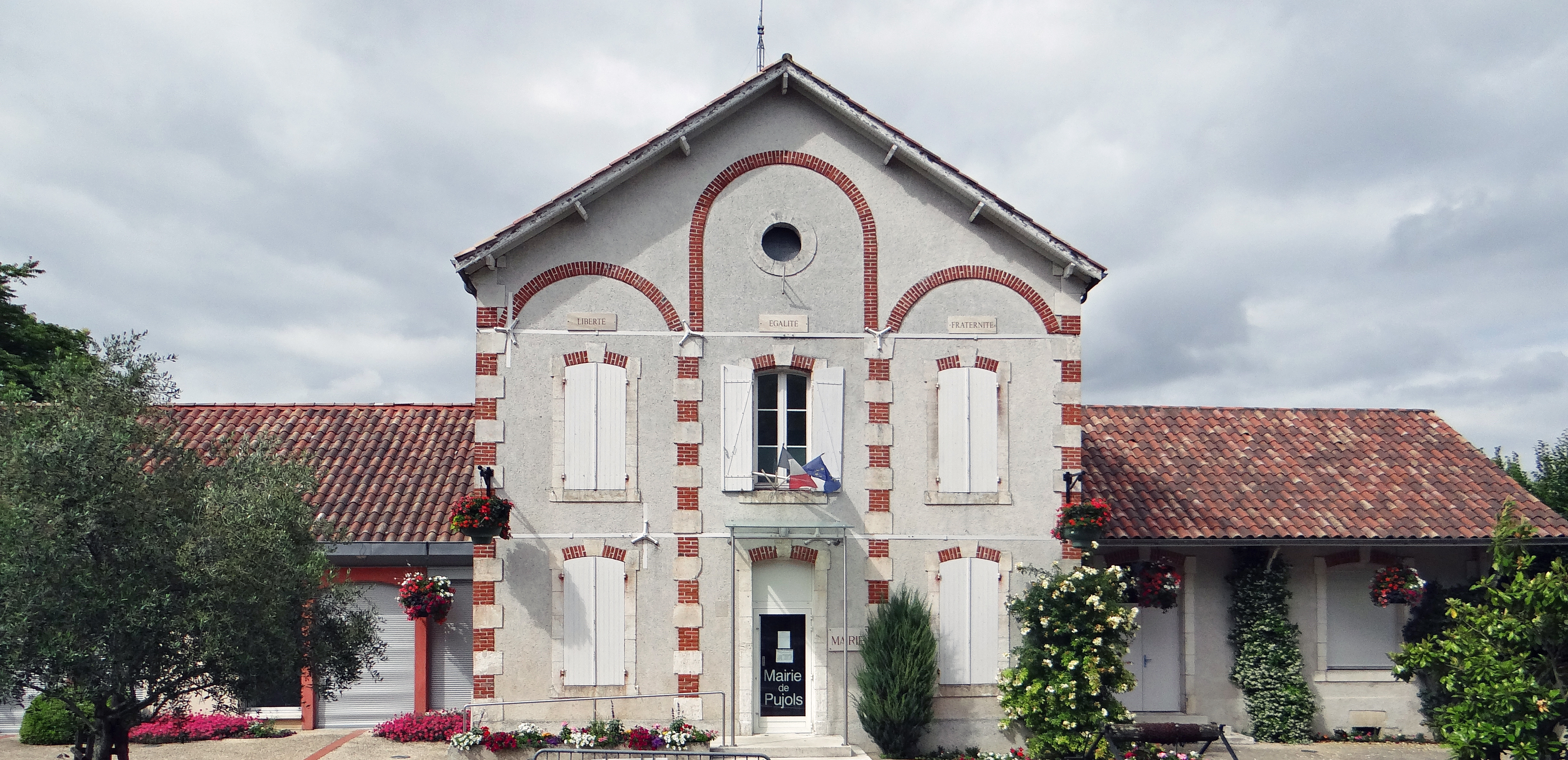
The town hall.

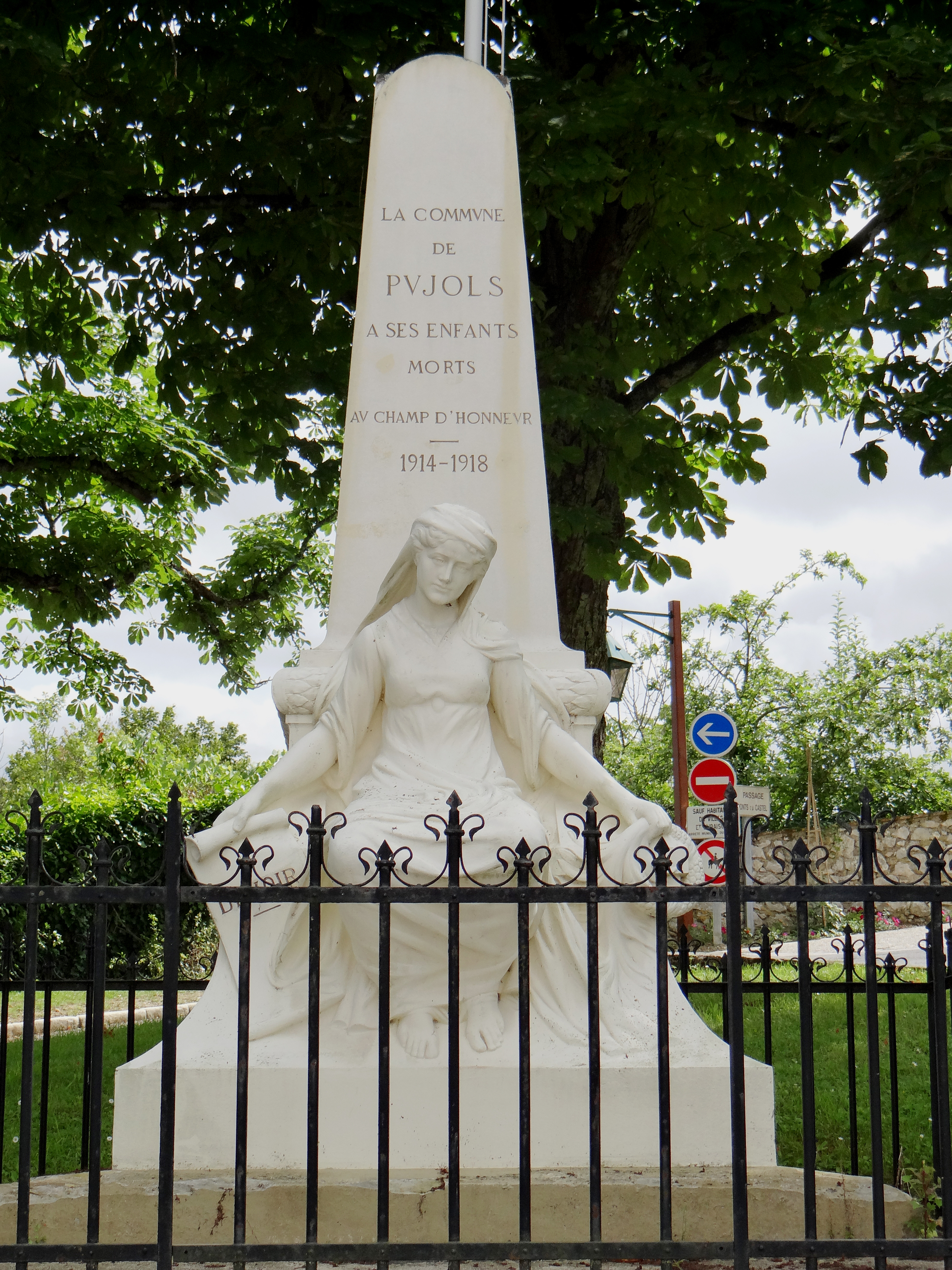
Monument to the Fallen, facing the town hall.

== Notable people ==
Bernard Lebrun – A Michelin star chef, and the first from the region of Villeneuve-sur-Lot.

== See also ==
- Communes of the Lot-et-Garonne department

== Bibliography ==
Gerbeaux, Abbé J B. Essai historique sur la baronnie de Pujols en Agenais. Agen: J. Roche libraire-éditeur, 1891.
