= Auradou =

- Commune
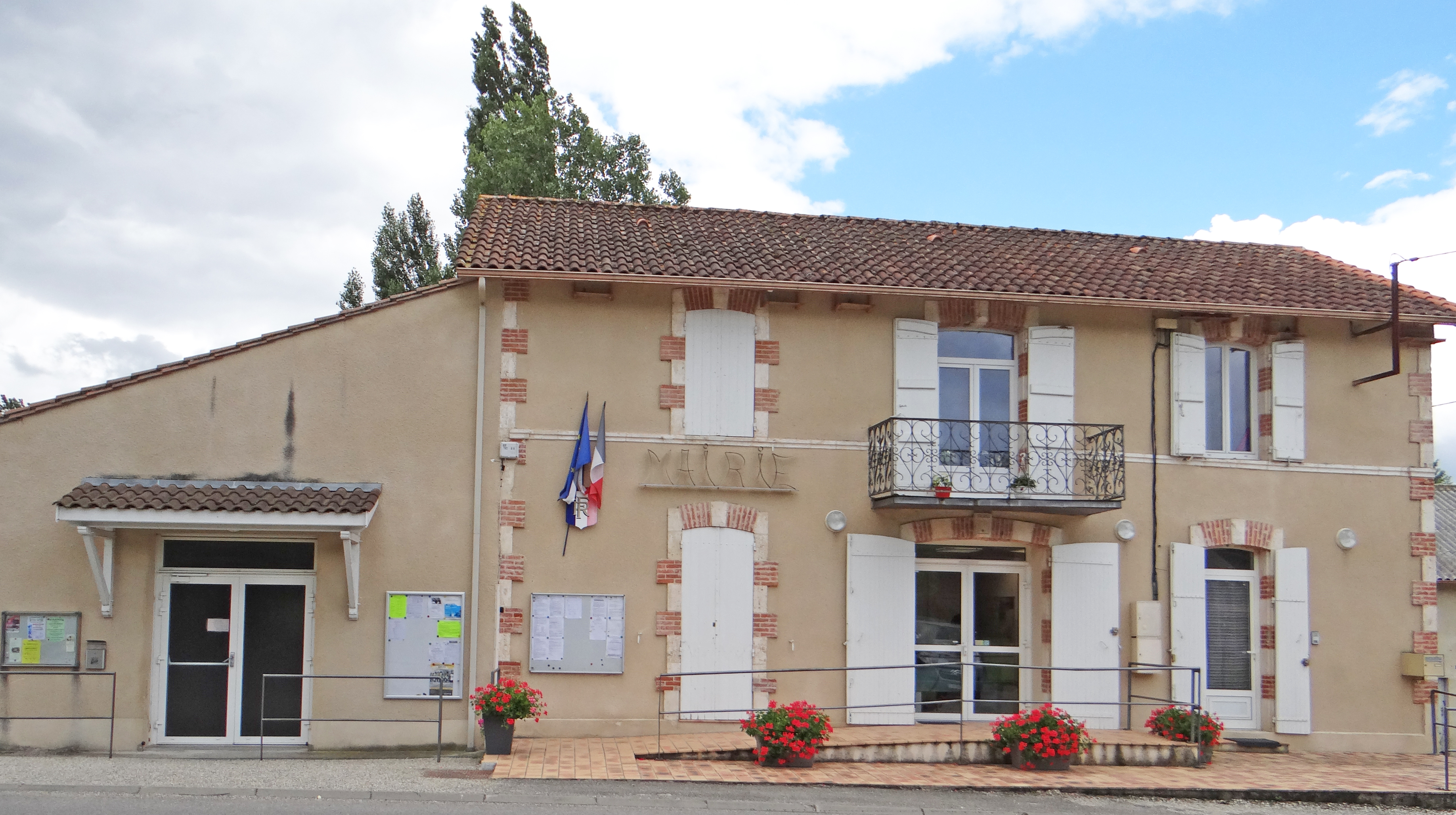
- The town hall in Auradou

- Coat of arms
- Location of Auradou
- Location within France Location within Nouvelle-Aquitaine
- Coordinates: 44°20′06″N 0°48′40″E
- Country: France
- Region: Nouvelle-Aquitaine
- Department: Lot-et-Garonne
- Arrondissement: Villeneuve-sur-Lot
- Canton: Le Pays de Serres
- Intercommunality: CC Fumel Vallée Lot

Government
  - Mayor (2020–2026): Séverine Bouchez Rezé
- Area^{1}: 11.17 km^{2} (4.31 sq mi)
- Elevation: 50 m (160 ft)
- Highest elevation: 222 m (728 ft)
- Lowest elevation: 69 m (226 ft)
- Population (2023): 405
  - Density: 36.3/km^{2} (93.9/sq mi)
- Time zone: UTC+01:00 (CET)
  - Summer (DST): UTC+02:00 (CEST)
- INSEE/Postal code: 47017 /47140
- ^{1} French Land Register data, which excludes lakes, ponds, glaciers > 1 km^{2} (0.386 sq mi or 247 acres) and river estuaries.

Auradou (French pronunciation: [oʁadu]; Occitan: Aurador) is a commune in the Lot-et-Garonne department in southwestern France.

== Population ==
Historical population
Year	Pop.	±% p.a.
1968	227	—
1975	220	−0.45%
1982	256	+2.19%
1990	311	+2.46%
1999	258	−2.05%
2007	351	+3.92%
2012	381	+1.65%
2017	396	+0.78%
2023	405	+0.38%
Source: INSEE

== See also ==
- Communes of the Lot-et-Garonne department
