= Saint-Antoine-de-Ficalba =

- Commune
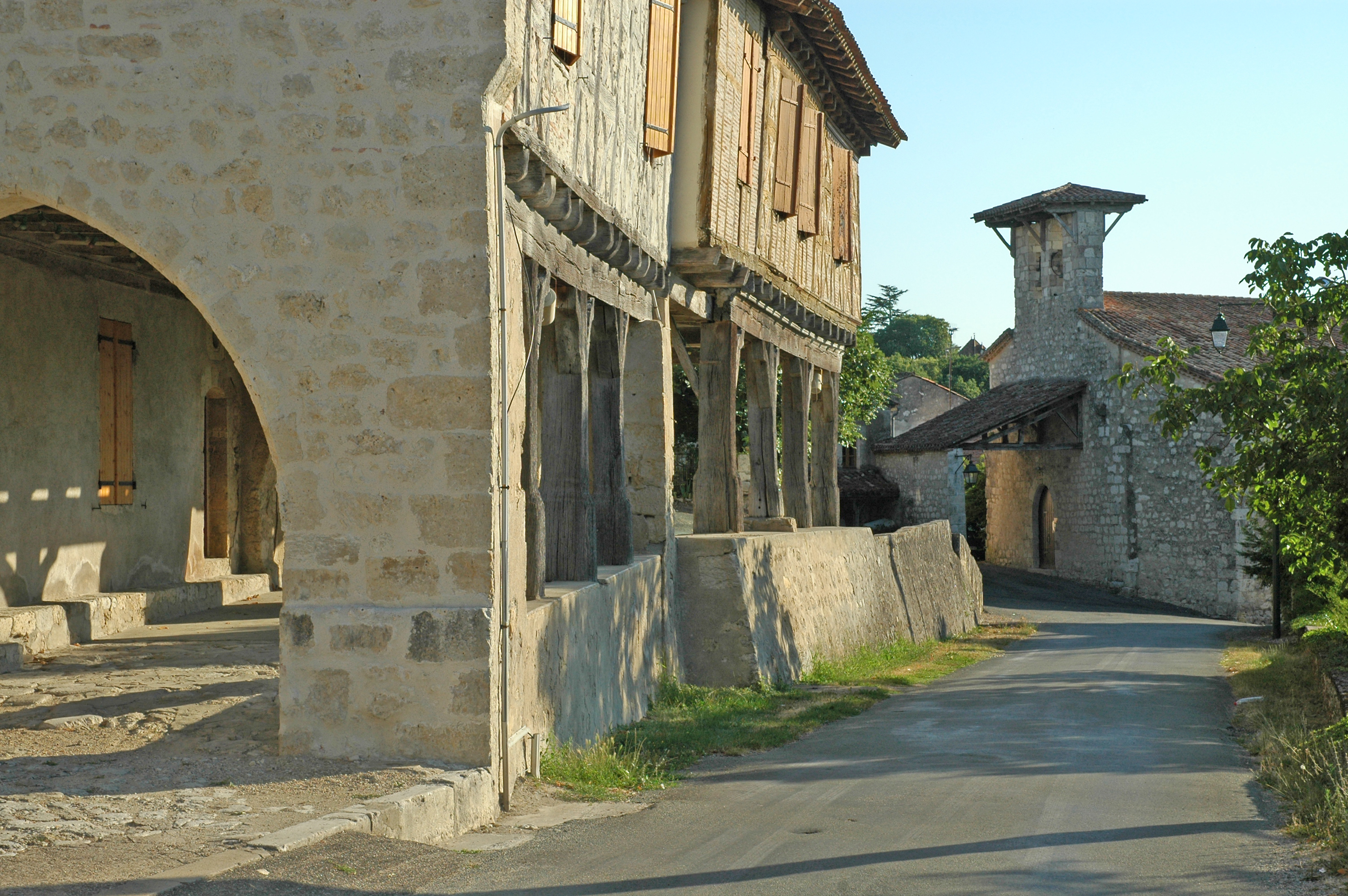
- The centre of Saint-Antoine-de-Ficalba

- Coat of arms
- Location of Saint-Antoine-de-Ficalba
- Location within France Location within Nouvelle-Aquitaine
- Coordinates: 44°19′58″N 0°43′01″E
- Country: France
- Region: Nouvelle-Aquitaine
- Department: Lot-et-Garonne
- Arrondissement: Villeneuve-sur-Lot
- Canton: Villeneuve-sur-Lot-2
- Intercommunality: CA Grand Villeneuvois

Government
  - Mayor (2020–2026): Bernard Ajon
- Area^{1}: 10.93 km^{2} (4.22 sq mi)
- Elevation: 184 m (604 ft)
- Highest elevation: 231 m (758 ft)
- Lowest elevation: 108 m (354 ft)
- Population (2023): 721
  - Density: 66.0/km^{2} (171/sq mi)
- Time zone: UTC+01:00 (CET)
  - Summer (DST): UTC+02:00 (CEST)
- INSEE/Postal code: 47228 /47340
- ^{1} French Land Register data, which excludes lakes, ponds, glaciers > 1 km^{2} (0.386 sq mi or 247 acres) and river estuaries.

Saint-Antoine-de-Ficalba (French pronunciation: [sɛ̃t‿ɑ̃twan də fikalba]; Occitan: Sent Antòni de Ficalbà) is a commune in the Lot-et-Garonne department in south-western France.

== See also ==
- Communes of the Lot-et-Garonne department
