= Saint-Robert, Lot-et-Garonne =

Saint-Robert
- Commune
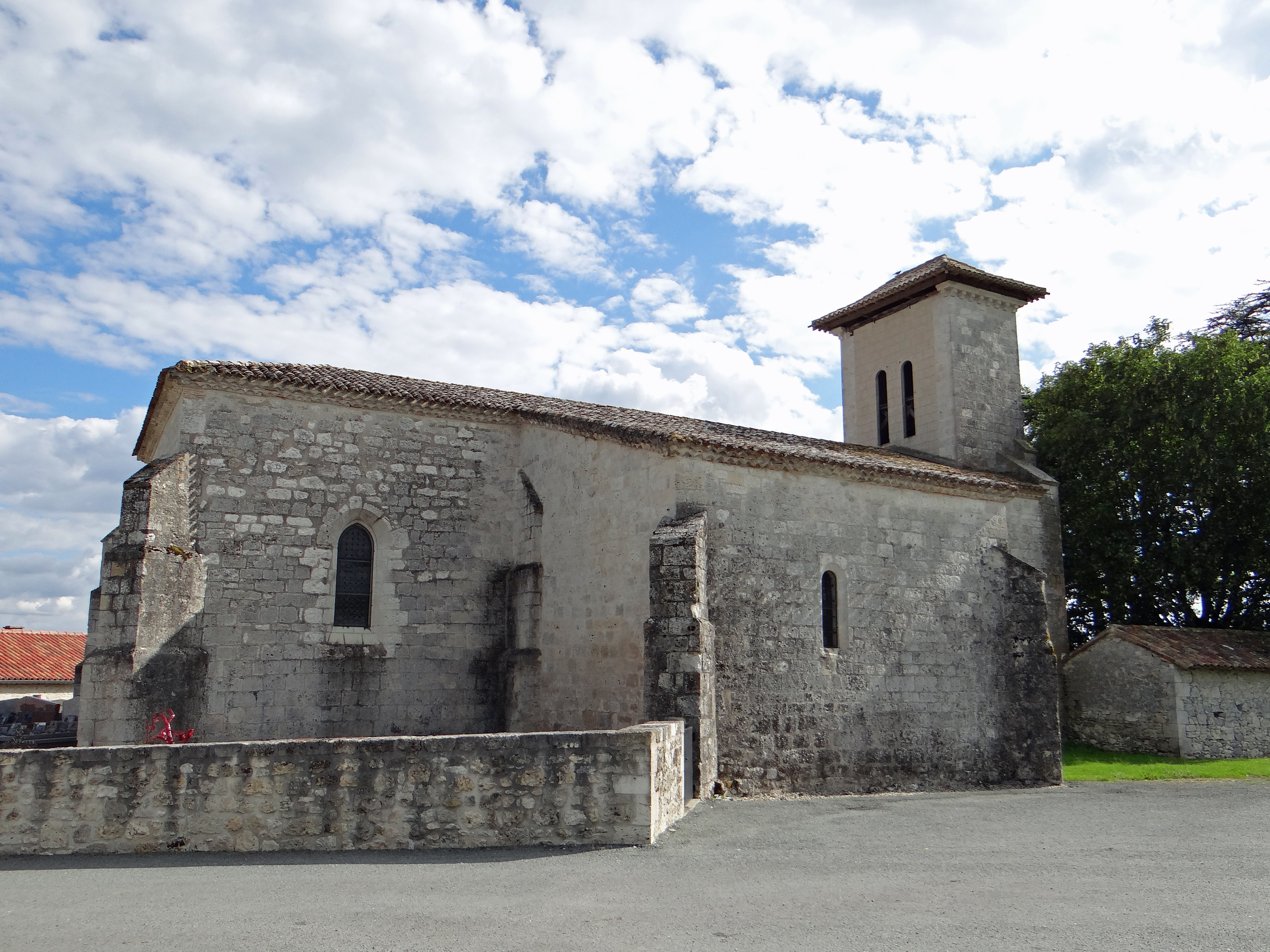
- The church in Saint-Robert

- Coat of arms
- Location of Saint-Robert
- Location within France Location within Nouvelle-Aquitaine
- Coordinates: 44°14′52″N 0°47′45″E
- Country: France
- Region: Nouvelle-Aquitaine
- Department: Lot-et-Garonne
- Arrondissement: Agen
- Canton: Le Pays de Serres
- Intercommunality: CA Grand Villeneuvois

Government
  - Mayor (2020–2026): Cyril Friedrichs
- Area^{1}: 6.74 km^{2} (2.60 sq mi)
- Highest elevation: 213 m (699 ft)
- Lowest elevation: 82 m (269 ft)
- Population (2023): 190
  - Density: 28/km^{2} (73/sq mi)
- Time zone: UTC+01:00 (CET)
  - Summer (DST): UTC+02:00 (CEST)
- INSEE/Postal code: 47273 /47340
- ^{1} French Land Register data, which excludes lakes, ponds, glaciers > 1 km^{2} (0.386 sq mi or 247 acres) and river estuaries.

Saint-Robert (French pronunciation: [sɛ̃ ʁɔbɛʁ]; Languedocien: Sant Robèrt) is a commune in the Lot-et-Garonne department in south-western France.

== See also ==
- Communes of the Lot-et-Garonne department
