= Cassignas =

- Commune
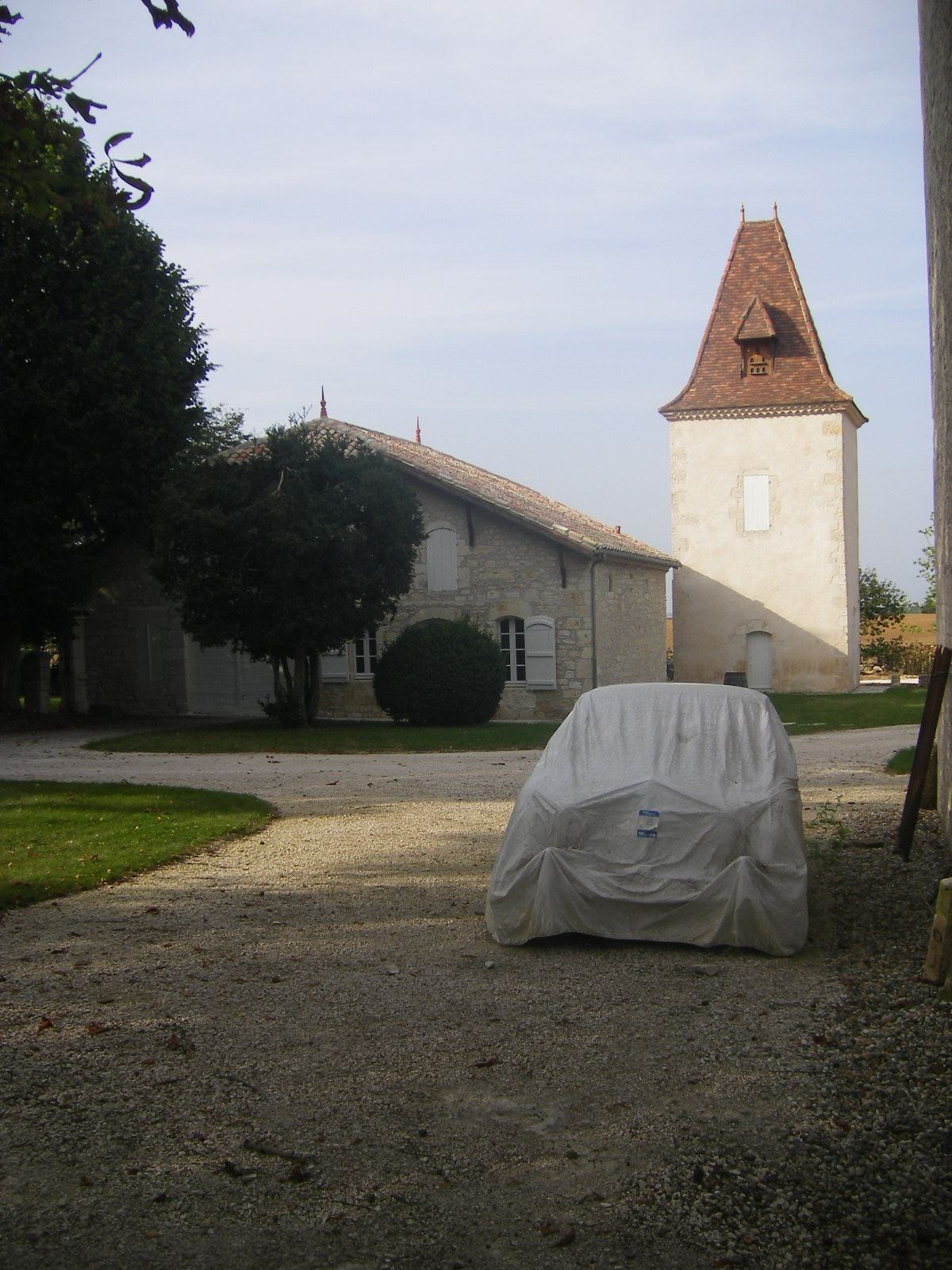
- The hamlet of Les Tricheries

- Coat of arms
- Location of Cassignas
- Location within France Location within Nouvelle-Aquitaine
- Coordinates: 44°18′03″N 0°47′20″E
- Country: France
- Region: Nouvelle-Aquitaine
- Department: Lot-et-Garonne
- Arrondissement: Agen
- Canton: Le Pays de Serres
- Intercommunality: CA Grand Villeneuvois

Government
  - Mayor (2020–2026): Jean Redon
- Area^{1}: 7.86 km^{2} (3.03 sq mi)
- Elevation: 215 m (705 ft)
- Highest elevation: 221 m (725 ft)
- Lowest elevation: 106 m (348 ft)
- Population (2023): 127
  - Density: 16.2/km^{2} (41.8/sq mi)
- Time zone: UTC+01:00 (CET)
  - Summer (DST): UTC+02:00 (CEST)
- INSEE/Postal code: 47050 /47340
- ^{1} French Land Register data, which excludes lakes, ponds, glaciers > 1 km^{2} (0.386 sq mi or 247 acres) and river estuaries.

Cassignas is a commune in the Lot-et-Garonne department in south-western France.

== See also ==
- Communes of the Lot-et-Garonne department
