= Castella, Lot-et-Garonne =

Castella
- Commune
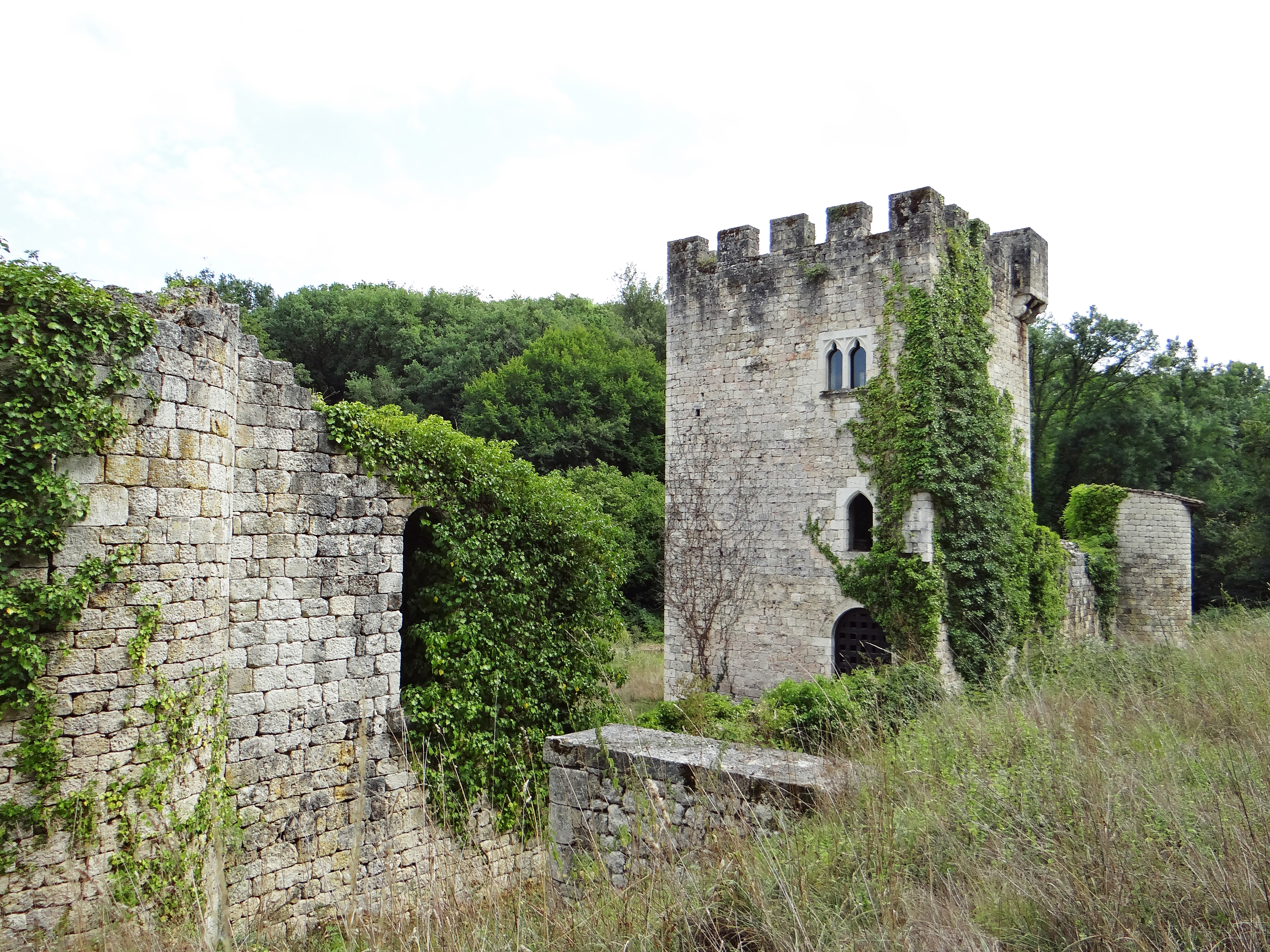

- Coat of arms
- Location of Castella
- Location within France Location within Nouvelle-Aquitaine
- Coordinates: 44°18′52″N 0°41′06″E
- Country: France
- Region: Nouvelle-Aquitaine
- Department: Lot-et-Garonne
- Arrondissement: Agen
- Canton: Le Pays de Serres
- Intercommunality: CA Grand Villeneuvois

Government
  - Mayor (2020–2026): Corine Lecourt-Bartherotte
- Area^{1}: 12.52 km^{2} (4.83 sq mi)
- Elevation: 220 m (720 ft)
- Highest elevation: 232 m (761 ft)
- Lowest elevation: 109 m (358 ft)
- Population (2023): 370
  - Density: 30/km^{2} (77/sq mi)
- Time zone: UTC+01:00 (CET)
  - Summer (DST): UTC+02:00 (CEST)
- INSEE/Postal code: 47053 /47340
- ^{1} French Land Register data, which excludes lakes, ponds, glaciers > 1 km^{2} (0.386 sq mi or 247 acres) and river estuaries.

Castella (Occitan: Castelhan) is a commune in the Lot-et-Garonne department in south-western France.

== See also ==
- Communes of the Lot-et-Garonne department
