= Massels =

- Commune
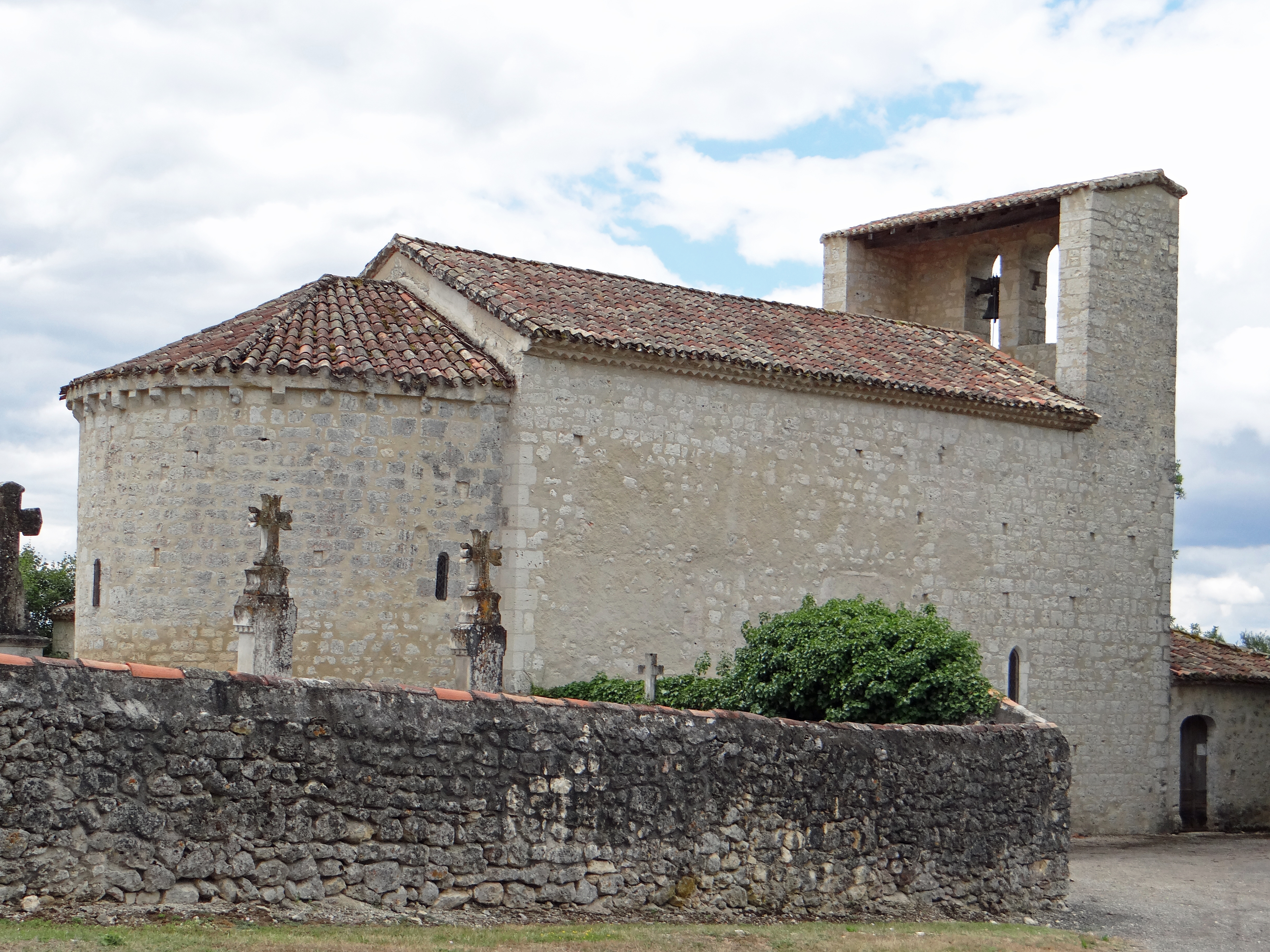
- The church of Sainte-Quitterie, in Massels
- Location of Massels
- Location within France Location within Nouvelle-Aquitaine
- Coordinates: 44°18′55″N 0°51′06″E
- Country: France
- Region: Nouvelle-Aquitaine
- Department: Lot-et-Garonne
- Arrondissement: Villeneuve-sur-Lot
- Canton: Le Pays de Serres
- Intercommunality: Fumel Vallée du Lot

Government
  - Mayor (2020–2026): Jacques Piccoli
- Area^{1}: 6.17 km^{2} (2.38 sq mi)
- Highest elevation: 229 m (751 ft)
- Lowest elevation: 97 m (318 ft)
- Population (2023): 120
  - Density: 19/km^{2} (50/sq mi)
- Time zone: UTC+01:00 (CET)
  - Summer (DST): UTC+02:00 (CEST)
- INSEE/Postal code: 47161 /47140
- ^{1} French Land Register data, which excludes lakes, ponds, glaciers > 1 km^{2} (0.386 sq mi or 247 acres) and river estuaries.

Massels (Occitan: Massatges) is a commune in the Lot-et-Garonne department in south-western France.

== See also ==
- Communes of the Lot-et-Garonne department
