= Lédat =

- Commune
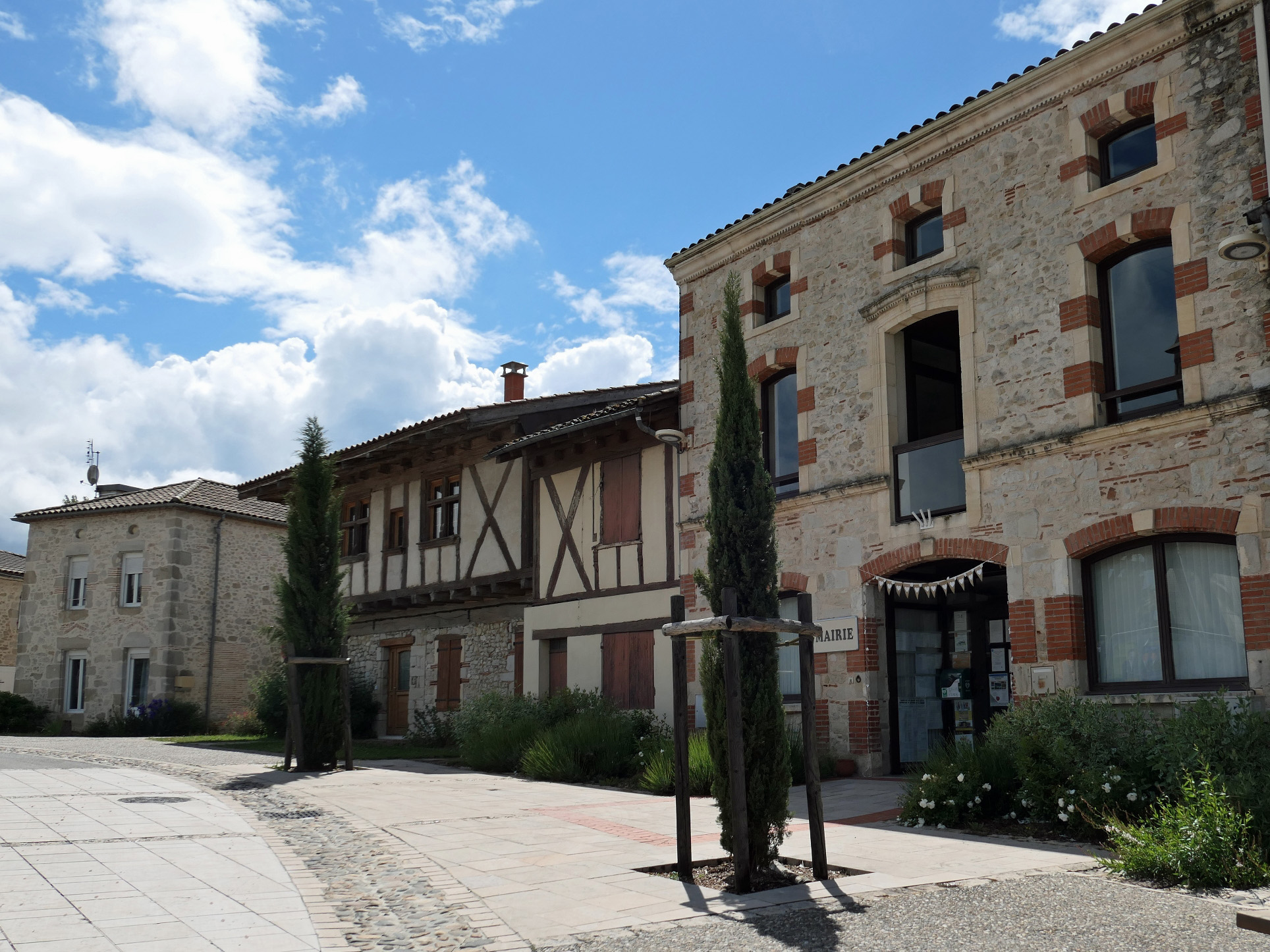
- Lédat Town hall
- Location of Lédat
- Location within France Location within Nouvelle-Aquitaine
- Coordinates: 44°27′18″N 0°40′07″E
- Country: France
- Region: Nouvelle-Aquitaine
- Department: Lot-et-Garonne
- Arrondissement: Villeneuve-sur-Lot
- Canton: Villeneuve-sur-Lot-1
- Intercommunality: CA Grand Villeneuvois

Government
  - Mayor (2020–2026): Christian Rousseau
- Area^{1}: 12.43 km^{2} (4.80 sq mi)
- Elevation: 86 m (282 ft)
- Highest elevation: 180 m (590 ft)
- Lowest elevation: 42 m (138 ft)
- Population (2023): 1,431
  - Density: 115.1/km^{2} (298.2/sq mi)
- Time zone: UTC+01:00 (CET)
  - Summer (DST): UTC+02:00 (CEST)
- INSEE/Postal code: 47146 /47300
- ^{1} French Land Register data, which excludes lakes, ponds, glaciers > 1 km^{2} (0.386 sq mi or 247 acres) and river estuaries.

Lédat (French pronunciation: [leda]; Occitan: Lo Ledat) is a commune in the Lot-et-Garonne department in south-western France.

== See also ==
- Communes of the Lot-et-Garonne department
