= Hautefage-la-Tour =

- Commune
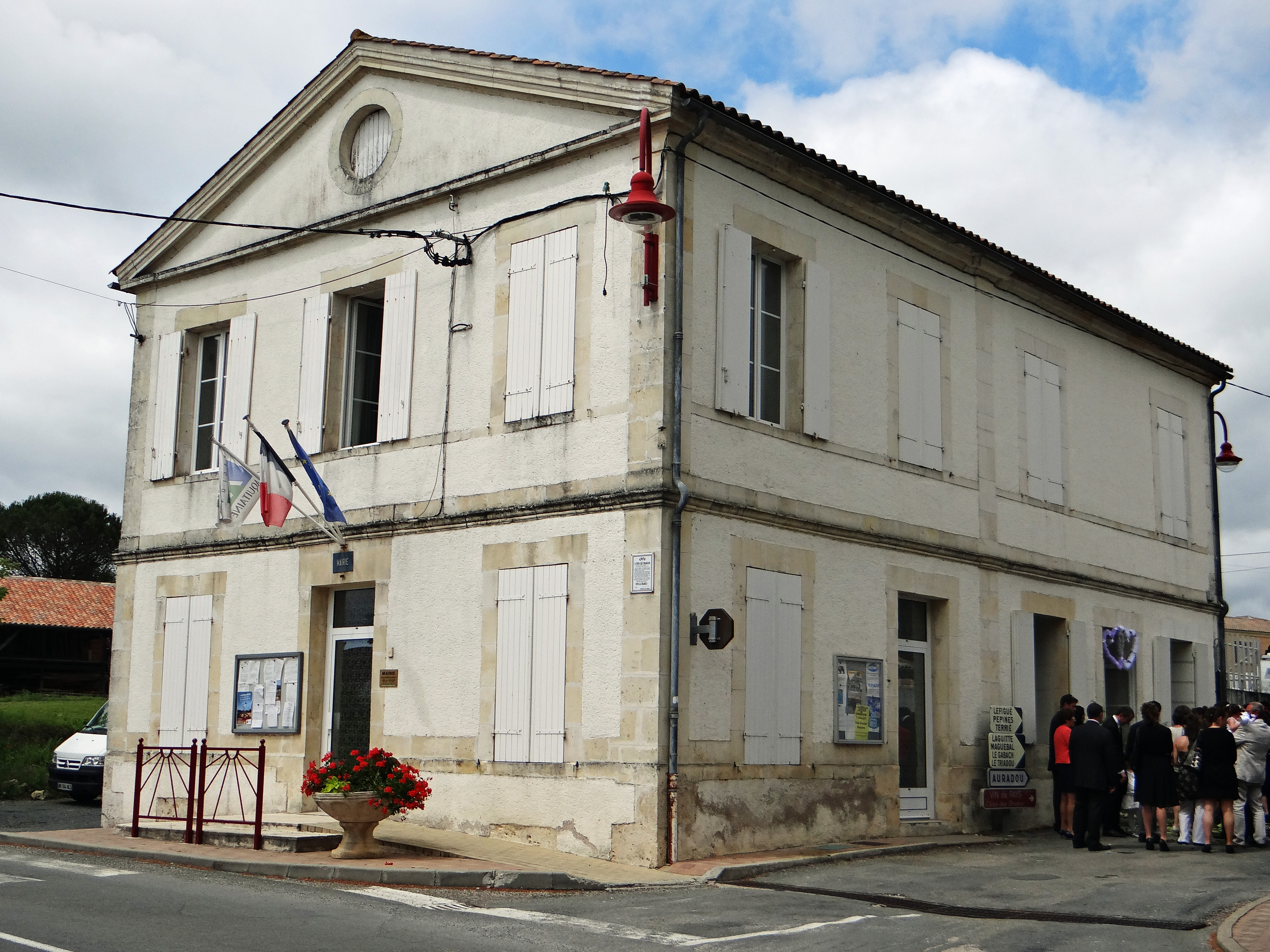
- The town hall in Hautefage-la-Tour
- Location of Hautefage-la-Tour
- Location within France Location within Nouvelle-Aquitaine
- Coordinates: 44°19′23″N 0°47′07″E
- Country: France
- Region: Nouvelle-Aquitaine
- Department: Lot-et-Garonne
- Arrondissement: Villeneuve-sur-Lot
- Canton: Villeneuve-sur-Lot-2
- Intercommunality: CA Grand Villeneuvois

Government
  - Mayor (2020–2026): Jean-Marie Lafosse
- Area^{1}: 20.75 km^{2} (8.01 sq mi)
- Elevation: 217 m (712 ft)
- Highest elevation: 217 m (712 ft)
- Lowest elevation: 70 m (230 ft)
- Population (2023): 1,029
  - Density: 49.59/km^{2} (128.4/sq mi)
- Time zone: UTC+01:00 (CET)
  - Summer (DST): UTC+02:00 (CEST)
- INSEE/Postal code: 47117 /47340
- ^{1} French Land Register data, which excludes lakes, ponds, glaciers > 1 km^{2} (0.386 sq mi or 247 acres) and river estuaries.

Hautefage-la-Tour (French pronunciation: [otfaʒ la tuʁ]; Occitan: Autafaja) is a commune in the Lot-et-Garonne department in south-western France.

== See also ==
- Communes of the Lot-et-Garonne department
