= Frespech =

- Commune
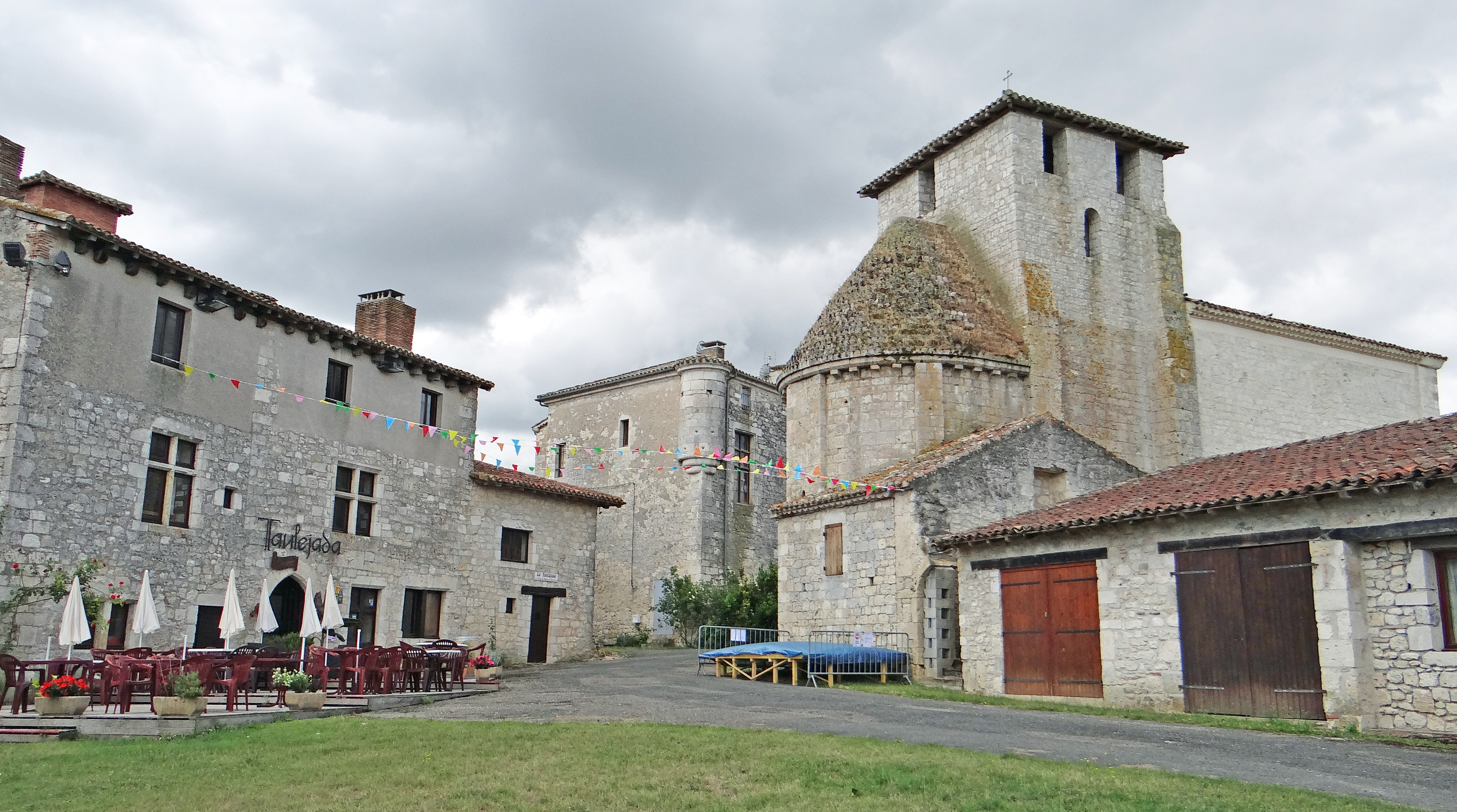
- The château and church in Frespech

- Coat of arms
- Location of Frespech
- Location within France Location within Nouvelle-Aquitaine
- Coordinates: 44°18′39″N 0°49′32″E
- Country: France
- Region: Nouvelle-Aquitaine
- Department: Lot-et-Garonne
- Arrondissement: Villeneuve-sur-Lot
- Canton: Le Pays de Serres
- Intercommunality: Fumel Vallée du Lot

Government
  - Mayor (2024–2026): Jean-Victor Delapart
- Area^{1}: 11.7 km^{2} (4.5 sq mi)
- Elevation: 220 m (720 ft)
- Highest elevation: 230 m (750 ft)
- Lowest elevation: 88 m (289 ft)
- Population (2023): 279
  - Density: 23.8/km^{2} (61.8/sq mi)
- Time zone: UTC+01:00 (CET)
  - Summer (DST): UTC+02:00 (CEST)
- INSEE/Postal code: 47105 /47140
- ^{1} French Land Register data, which excludes lakes, ponds, glaciers > 1 km^{2} (0.386 sq mi or 247 acres) and river estuaries.

Frespech is a commune in the Lot-et-Garonne department in south-western France.

== See also ==
- Communes of the Lot-et-Garonne department
