= Saint-Sylvestre-sur-Lot =

- Commune
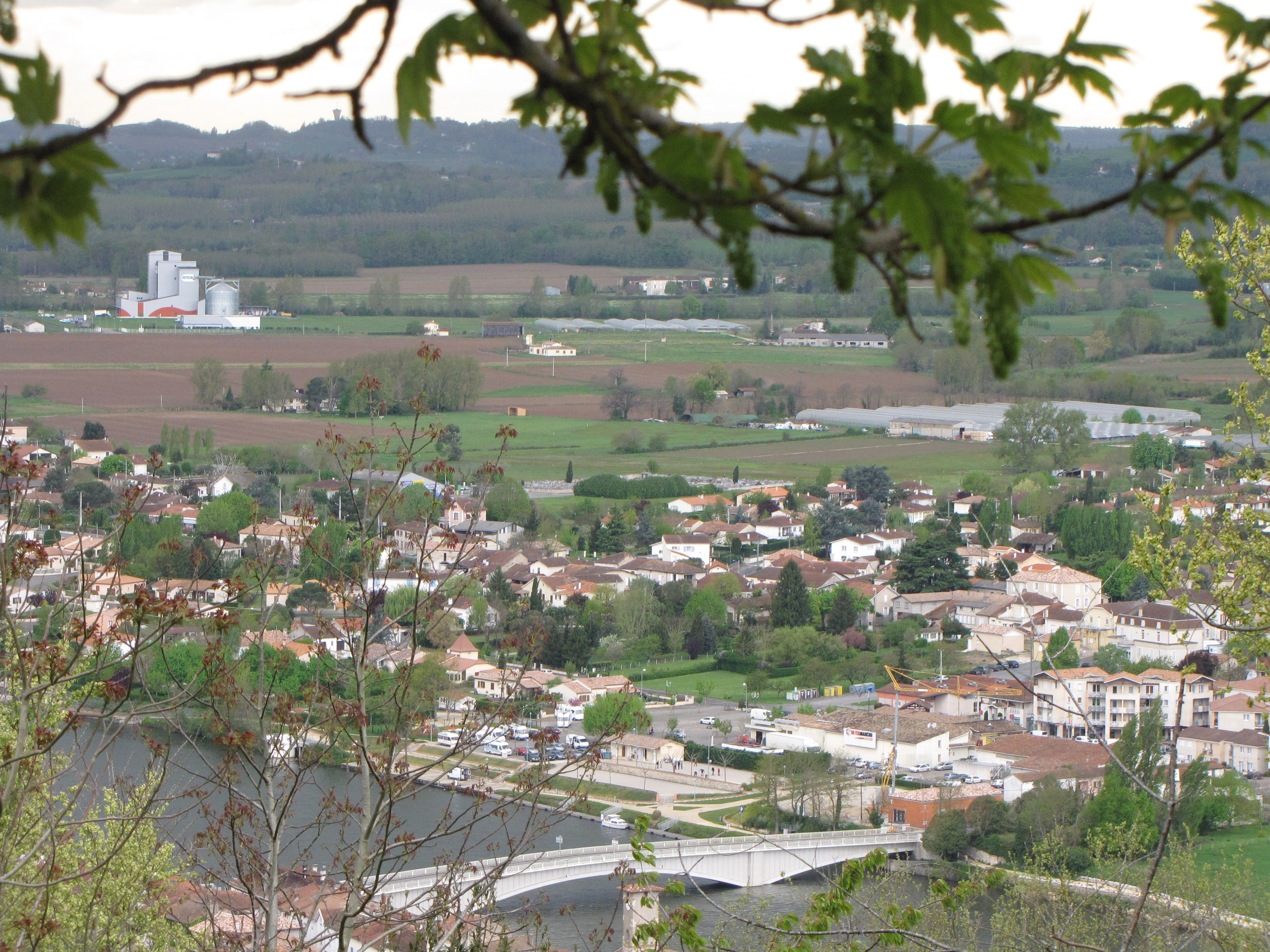
- A general view of Saint-Sylvestre
- Location of Saint-Sylvestre-sur-Lot
- Location within France Location within Nouvelle-Aquitaine
- Coordinates: 44°23′58″N 0°48′25″E
- Country: France
- Region: Nouvelle-Aquitaine
- Department: Lot-et-Garonne
- Arrondissement: Villeneuve-sur-Lot
- Canton: Le Pays de Serres

Government
  - Mayor (2020–2026): Yann Bihouée
- Area^{1}: 21.27 km^{2} (8.21 sq mi)
- Elevation: 54 m (177 ft)
- Highest elevation: 218 m (715 ft)
- Lowest elevation: 52 m (171 ft)
- Population (2023): 2,397
  - Density: 112.7/km^{2} (291.9/sq mi)
- Time zone: UTC+01:00 (CET)
  - Summer (DST): UTC+02:00 (CEST)
- INSEE/Postal code: 47280 /47140
- ^{1} French Land Register data, which excludes lakes, ponds, glaciers > 1 km^{2} (0.386 sq mi or 247 acres) and river estuaries.

Saint-Sylvestre-sur-Lot (French pronunciation: [sɛ̃ silvɛstʁ syʁ lɔt], literally Saint-Sylvestre on Lot; Languedocien: Sent Salvèstre d'Òut) is a commune in the Lot-et-Garonne department in south-western France.

== Population ==
Historical population
Year	Pop.	±% p.a.
1968	1,385	—
1975	1,699	+2.96%
1982	1,879	+1.45%
1990	2,040	+1.03%
1999	2,060	+0.11%
2007	2,200	+0.83%
2012	2,296	+0.86%
2017	2,296	+0.00%
2023	2,397	+0.72%
Source: INSEE

== See also ==
- Communes of the Lot-et-Garonne department
