= Trémons =

- Commune
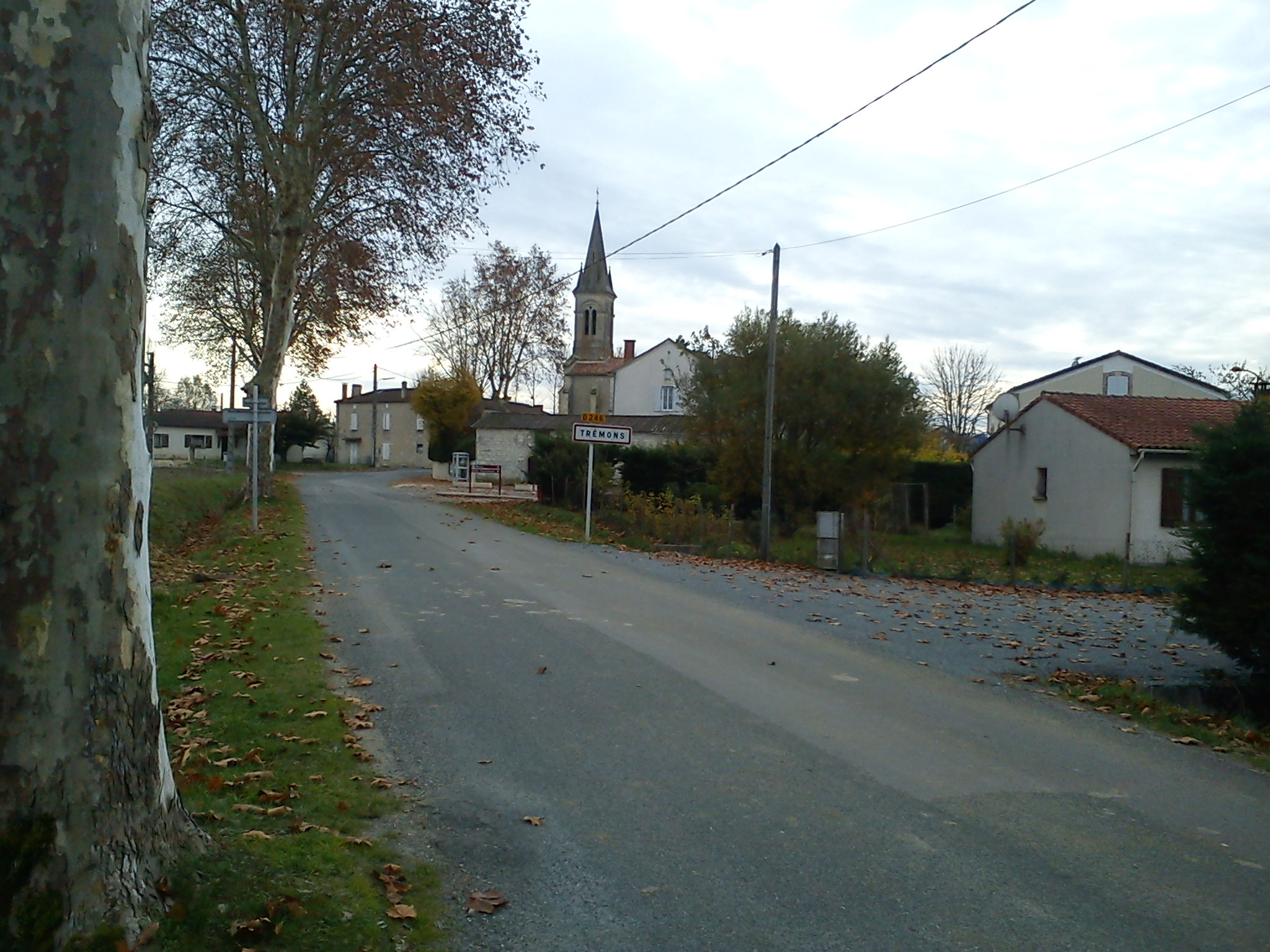
- The road into Trémons
- Location of Trémons
- Location within France Location within Nouvelle-Aquitaine
- Coordinates: 44°24′38″N 0°54′01″E
- Country: France
- Region: Nouvelle-Aquitaine
- Department: Lot-et-Garonne
- Arrondissement: Villeneuve-sur-Lot
- Canton: Le Pays de Serres
- Intercommunality: Fumel Vallée du Lot

Government
  - Mayor (2020–2026): Marie-Thérèse Pouchou
- Area^{1}: 13.49 km^{2} (5.21 sq mi)
- Elevation: 67 m (220 ft)
- Highest elevation: 230 m (750 ft)
- Lowest elevation: 52 m (171 ft)
- Population (2023): 409
  - Density: 30.3/km^{2} (78.5/sq mi)
- Time zone: UTC+01:00 (CET)
  - Summer (DST): UTC+02:00 (CEST)
- INSEE/Postal code: 47314 /47140
- ^{1} French Land Register data, which excludes lakes, ponds, glaciers > 1 km^{2} (0.386 sq mi or 247 acres) and river estuaries.

Trémons is a commune in the Lot-et-Garonne department in south-western France.

== See also ==
- Communes of the Lot-et-Garonne department
