= Agenais =

Historical region of France

Coordinates: 44.20°N 0.62°E

County of Agenois
- 886–1791
- Capital: Agen
- Religion: Catholicism
- Government: County
- Legislature: Parlement
  - Upper house: Parliament of Bordeaux
- Historical era: Middle Ages / Early Modern
  - Established: 886
  - Disestablishment of the Provinces: 1791
Succeeded by
Lot-et-Garonne

Agenais (French pronunciation: [aʒ(ə)nɛ]), or Agenois (French pronunciation: [aʒ(ə)nwa]), was an ancient region that became a county (Old French: conté or cunté) of France, south of Périgord.

== History ==
In ancient Gaul the region was the country of the Nitiobroges with Aginnum for their capital, which in the fourth century was the Civitas Agennensium, which was a part of Aquitania Secunda and which formed the diocese of Agen. From 833 to 848, all the land seems to have been ravaged by the Vikings. Having in general shared the fortunes of Aquitaine during the Merovingian and Carolingian periods, Agenais from about 886 became an hereditary county in the part of the country now called Gascony (Vasconia). The first count of Agenais (comte d'Agen) was William I of Périgord (d. 920), son of Wulgrin I of Angoulême.

In 1038 this county was purchased by William, Duke of Aquitaine and Count of Poitiers. The marriage of Eleanor of Aquitaine with the future Henry II of England in 1152 brought the county under the sway of the Plantagenet house of Anjou. When Richard Coeur-de-Lion married his sister Joan to Raymund VI, Count of Toulouse, in 1196, Agenais formed part of the princess's dowry, and formed part of the other estates of the last independent count of Toulouse. In 1212, during the Albigensian Crusade, Simon de Montfort captured the Cathar fortress of Penne-d'Agenais and burned Cathars at the stake. At the 1259 Treaty of Paris, Louis IX of France agreed to pay an annual rent to Henry III of England for Louis' possession of Agenais. The estates of Agenais lapsed to the crown of France in 1271.

This, however, was not for long; the king of France had to recognize the prior rights of the king of England to the possession of the county, and restored it to him in 1279. During the Hundred Years' War between the English and the French, Agenais was frequently taken and retaken, the final retreat of the English in 1453 at last leaving the king of France in peaceable possession.

In 1561, Guyenne was made a province, and included Bordelais, Bazadais, Limousin, Périgord, Quercy, Rouergue, Agenais, Saintonge, and Angoumois. Thenceforth Agenais was no more than an administrative term. At the end of the Ancien Régime it formed part of the Gouvernement of Guienne, and at the Revolution it was incorporated within the département of Lot-et-Garonne, of which it constitutes nearly the whole. The title of count of Agenais, which the kings of England had allowed to fall into desuetude, was revived by the kings of France, and in 1789 was held by the family of the dukes of Richelieu.
