= Cézallier Massif =

Volcanic plateau in France

Cézallier
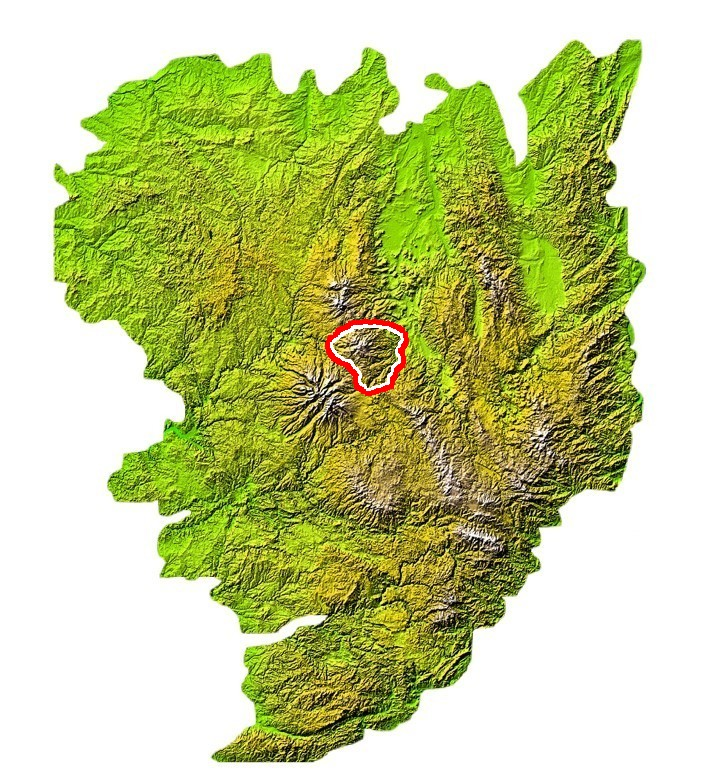
- Location map of Cézallier in the Massif Central.

Highest point
- Elevation: 1,547 m (5,075 ft) at Signal du Luguet
- Coordinates: 45.3339°N 2.98694°E

Geography
- Location: Auvergne-Rhône-Alpes, France
- Parent range: Massif Central

The Cézallier Massif, which can also be written Cézalier (in Auvergnat Occitan Sejaleir), is a volcanic plateau in the Massif Central, between the Monts Dore and Monts du Cantal, making up a natural region of France. It is mainly divided between two départements: Puy-de-Dôme and Cantal, but also includes a small part of Haute-Loire. It is also one of the five natural regions making up the Parc naturel régional des volcans d'Auvergne.

The average altitude of the massif is between 1,200 and 1,500 m. The massif's highest point is the Signal du Luguet (1,547 m).

== Toponymy ==
The origin of the name Cézallier is a matter of debate. It is generally thought to come from the Auvergnat seijaveî meaning "rye land". Others believe it comes from the association of two ancient words meaning "mountain" and "place where oaks grow ".

From the 18th century onwards, Cézallier was presented by scientists, administrators and writers as a massif or mountain. The name Cézallier did not yet appear on the maps drawn up by staff officers at the end of the 19th century; they simply referred to the "Signal du Luguet", thus naming the highest point of the village of Le Luguet, which had up to 1,400 inhabitants at the end of the 19th century.

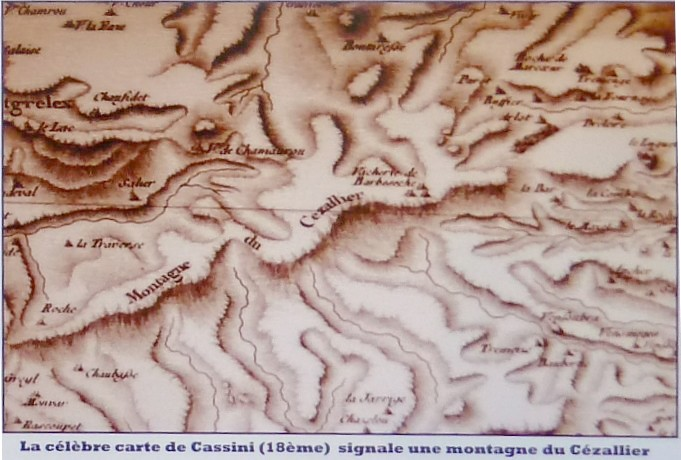
Cassini map (18th century) showing the Cézallier mountain.

In fact, popular usage knew neither the Cézallier nor the Luguet region. It was cartographers and geographers who extended the name Cézallier, making it a massif, whereas traditionally it was a summit. The name Cézallier has now been included as one of the Auvergne massifs in the geographical nomenclature of the Massif Central, probably for good.

== Geography ==
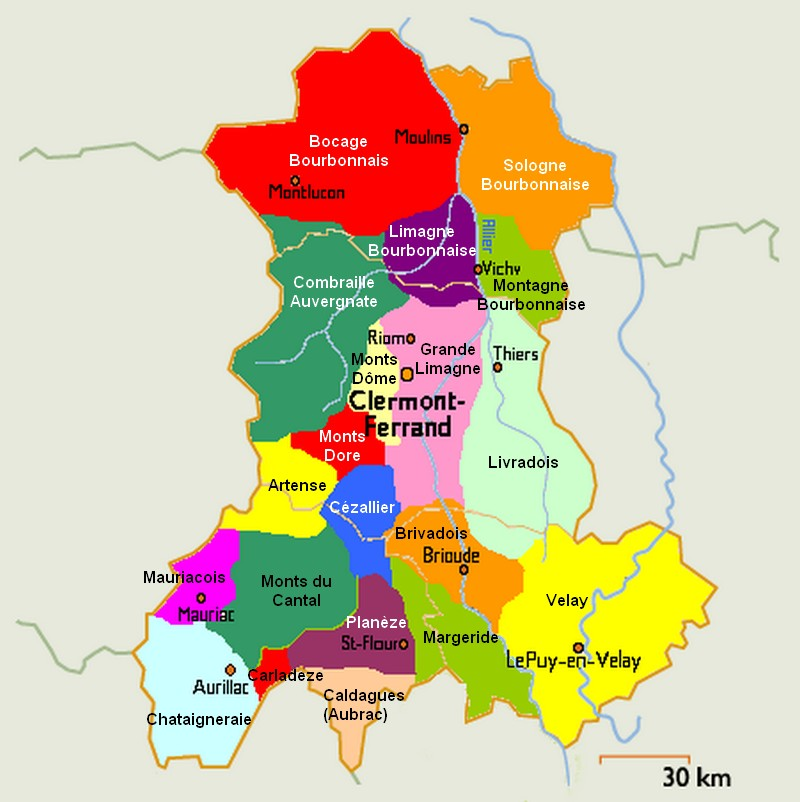
Location of the Cézallier (in blue) in the former Auvergne region.

=== Location ===
The Cézallier occupies a central position in the Auvergne mountains. It is bordered to the north by the Monts Dore and to the south by the Cantal mountains. To the west, Artense forms a transition with the Limousin mountains, while to the east lies the Limagne plain.

Although the Cézallier extends mainly between the Puy-de-Dôme (between Égliseneuve-d'Entraigues to the west and Apchat to the east) and the Cantal (between Lugarde to the west and Massiac to the east), it also includes a number of communes in the Haute-Loire, on the left bank of the Alagnon.

=== Communes of the Cézallier ===
The following table groups communes by geographical zone, and does not take into account administrative divisions.

Cézallier West	Cézallier South	Estives Hautes	Couzes Pays	Coupés Alagnonais
Chanterelle; Condat; Égliseneuve-d'Entraigues; Lugarde; Marchastel; Saint-Amandin; Saint-Bonnet-de-Condat; Saint-Saturnin	Allanche; Chalinargues; Joursac; Landeyrat; Neussargues-Moissac; Peyrusse; Sainte-Anastasie; Ségur-les-Villas; Vernols; Vèze	Anzat-le-Luguet; Boutaresse; Brion; Espinchal; La Godivelle; Marcenat; Mazoires; Montgreleix; Pradiers; Saint-Alyre-ès-Montagne	Apchat; Ardes; Compains; La Chapelle-Marcousse; Rentières; Roche-Charles-la-Mayrand	Autrac; Auriac-l'Église; Blesle; Charmensac; Laurie; Leyvaux; Massiac; Molèdes; Molompize; Saint-Étienne-sur-Blesle; Torsiac

=== Topography ===
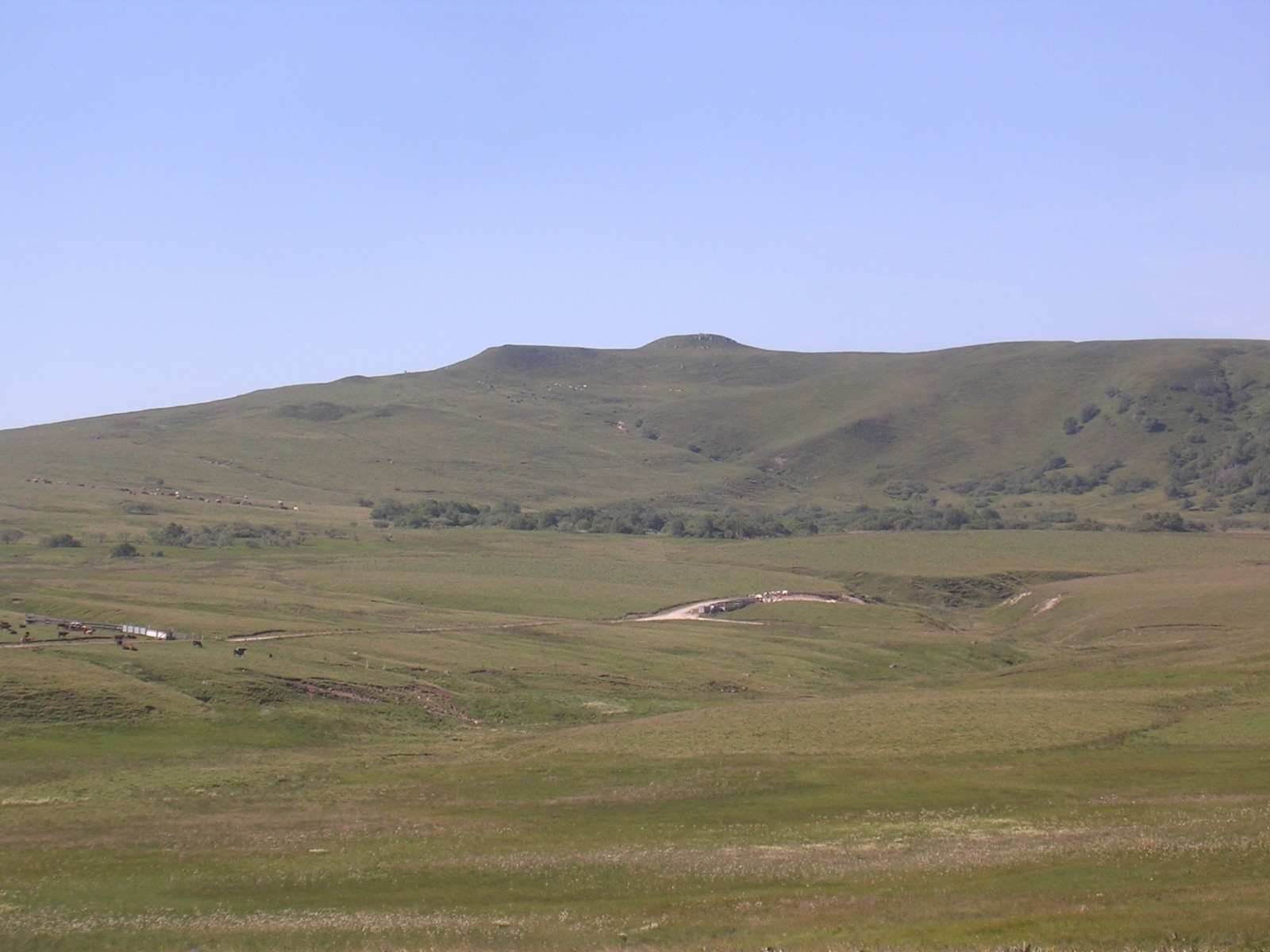
Mount Chamaroux.

As is the case with many Hawaiian-type volcanic formations, the Cézallier's most pronounced reliefs are paradoxically not the highest peaks, but the valleys on the periphery, where fluvial erosion prior to volcanism continued and intensified after its emergence, The result is locally deep gorges (Couzes d'Ardes, de Valbeleix, Sianne valley), which are more numerous on the eastern slopes, where the rivers run a short distance to join the lower Allier valley, while the western slopes have more moderate gradients.

In contrast to the two neighbouring, higher stratovolcanoes, the Monts du Cantal and Monts Dore, where glacial erosion has left sharp ridges and steep cirques in their centers, the Haut Cézallier – although once entirely ice-covered, albeit for less prolonged and less intense periods – features essentially gentle, rounded reliefs (domes, plateaux). However, the imprint of the glaciers is everywhere: embryonic cirques (Artout, le Joran...), peat bogs, erratic boulders, etc. To the north, the last volcanic edifices, not yet dismantled by erosion, also display more vigorous forms (Montchal and Montcineyre eruptive cones, Chamaroux dome).

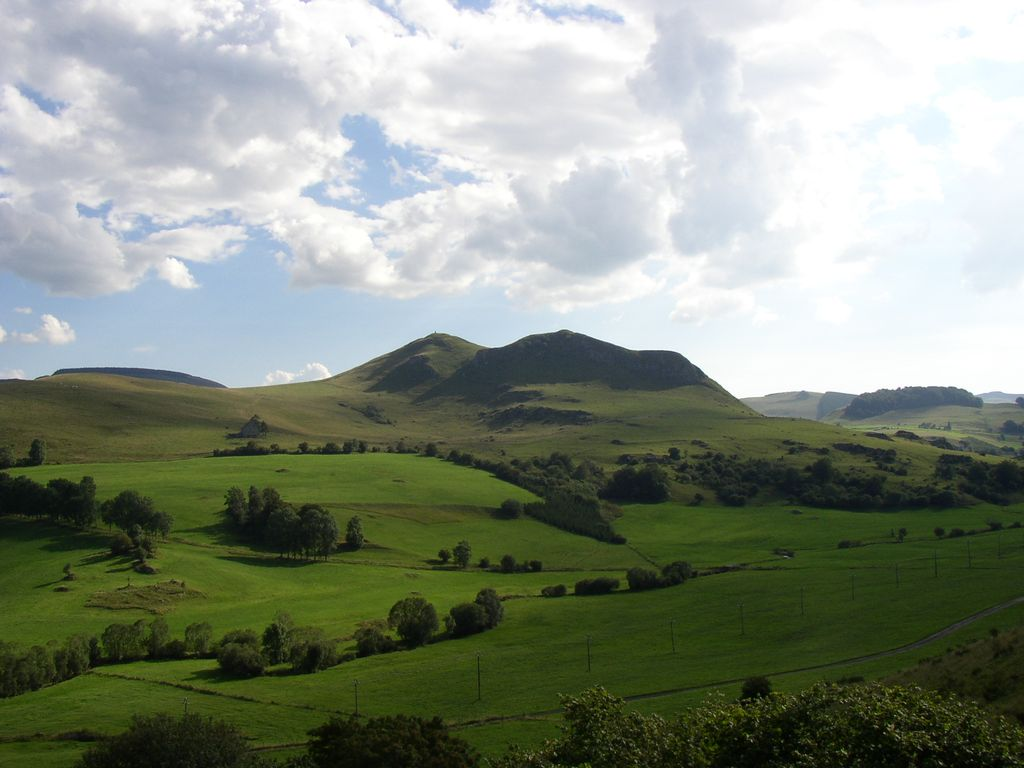
Cézallier in spring, Le Chabrut (1,297 metres).

==== Main peaks ====
The main peaks of the Cézallier all rise to just over 1,500 meters, and all three are covered by pastures, but crowned just at the top by a small coniferous wood. The highest point of the massif, in one of these woods, is the Signal du Luguet (1,547 metres), close to the village of the same name and overlooking the former Artout glacial cirque.

- Signal du Luguet, 1,547 m (5,075 ft)
- Le Pépendille, 1,543 m (5,062 ft)
- Le Perche, 1,511 m (4,957 ft)
- Mont Chamaroux, 1,476 m (4,843 ft)
- Montagne des Huides, 1,449 m (4,754 ft)
- Mont Mouchet, 1,405 m (4,610 ft)
- Rocherousse Mountain, 1,391 m (4,564 ft)
- Niollet Mountain, 1,372 m (4,501 ft)
- Roche de Piroux, 1,365 m (4,478 ft)
- Puy de la Vaisse, 1,358 m (4,455 ft)
- Teston du Joran, 1,328 m (4,357 ft)
- Le Testou, 1,327 m (4,354 ft)
- Puy de la Rode, 1,312 m (4,304 ft)
- Montagne de Janson, 1,298 m (4,259 ft)
- Le Chabrut, 1,297 m (4,255 ft)
- Puy de Mathonière, 1,295 m (4,249 ft)
- Montagne de Riocros Haute, 1,294 m (4,245 ft)
- La Motte, 1,277 m (4,190 ft)
- La Chaux d'Espinchal, 1,230 m (4,040 ft)
- Montagne de la Taillade, 1,211 m (3,973 ft)
- Puy Montcey, 1,193 m (3,914 ft)
- Montagne des Mas, 1,154 m (3,786 ft)
- Moutissous Mountain, 1,146 m (3,760 ft)
- Le Sarran, 1,137 m (3,730 ft)

=== Hydrography ===
Rivers in the Loire basin	Rivers in the Dordogne in the Dordogne basin	Lakes
L’Allanche; La Bouzaire; La Sianne; La Fontaine Saint Martin (La Fontaine Salée); La Voireuze; Le Bave; L'Auze; Le ruisseau de la Roche; La Couze d'Ardes; La Couze de Valbeleix	La Grande Rhue; La Rhue; Le Bonjon; La Santoire	Bas de La Godivelle lake (peat bog); Haut de La Godivelle lake (crater); Chaumiane lake; Chandroux lake (peat bog); Jolan lake; Cureyre lake (peat bog); Esclause lake; Chaumoune lake; Fage lake (impounded); Landie lake; Saint-Alyre lake (peat bog); Serre lake; Terrisse lake(impounded); Bordes lake; Bruyères de Sianne lake (impounded); Moines lake; Pécher lake (impounded)

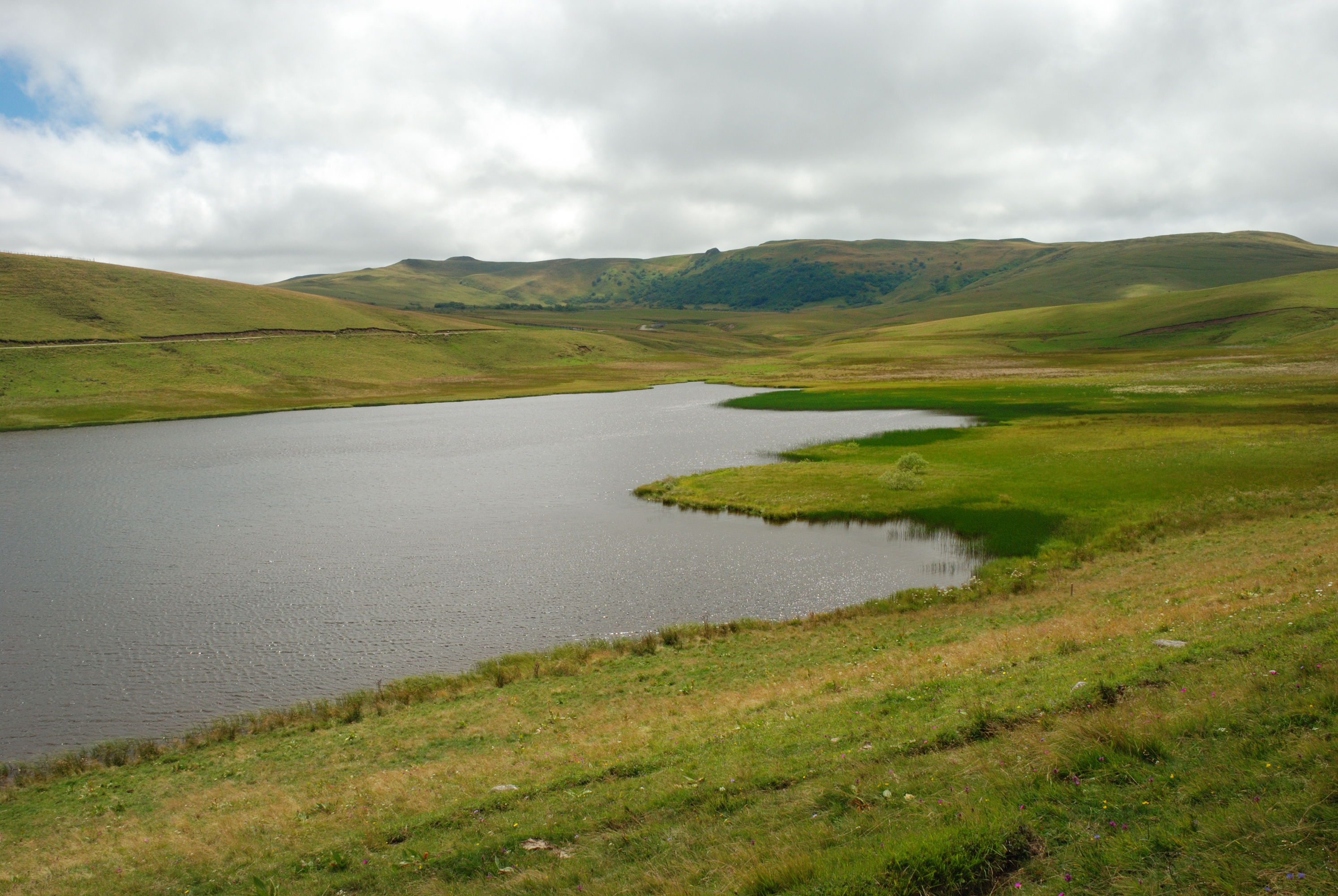
Saint-Alyre lake.

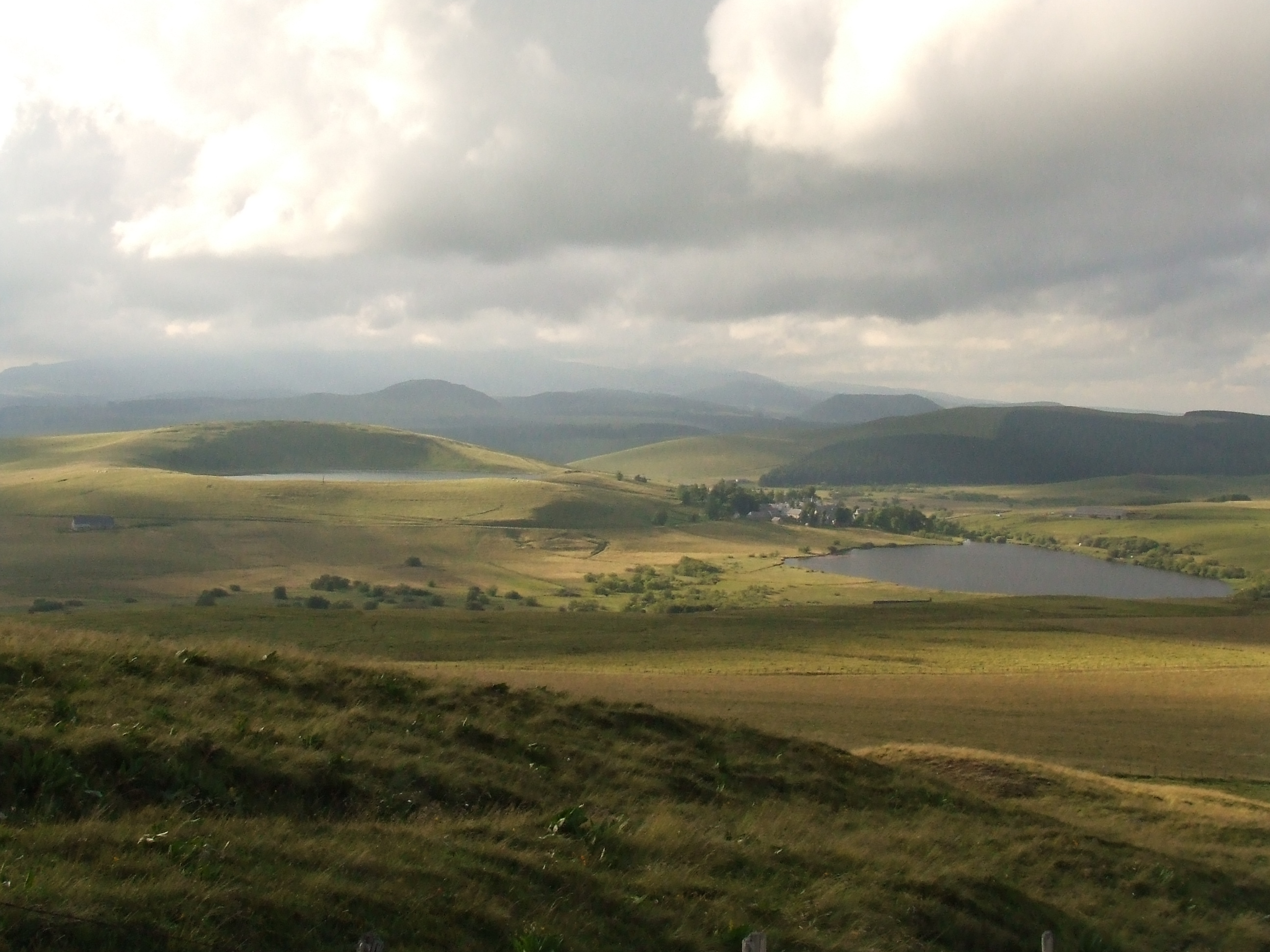
Haut lake (left hand) and Bas lake (right hand).

=== Geology ===
The Cézallier forms a series of plateaus and small volcanic mountains, mainly made up of fluid lava flows (basalt) but also a few craters, the most recent of which are only a few thousand years old (Montchal, Montcineyre) and are sometimes occupied by lakes (Pavin, Chauvet, La Godivelle).

==== The stratovolcano ====
The stratovolcano that formed the Cézallier Massif appeared eight million years ago and died out three million years ago. Between 25 and 30 km long and 10 km wide, it was oriented north–south, and the Signal du Luguet is one of its main remnants. In its central part, the volcano consists of an accumulation of lava flows (basalt) and fragmented materials associated with trachyte and phonolite domes, as well as layers of pumice. On the outskirts of the Luguet massif, all that remains of this activity are a few mounds cleared by glacial erosion and then by run-off water (relief inversion process).

=== Climate ===
Most of the Cézallier is part of the sub-oceanic mountain range of the Monts d'Auvergne and Aubrac, characterized by a notable ascending effect that reactivates humid Atlantic flows, and by a moderate summer-winter temperature range (around 14° between January and July) within a very cool annual average (6° at around 1,200 meters altitude).

The result is a high overall precipitation level and a significant, albeit irregular, winter snowfall due to oceanic thaws and the predominant role played by the wind in the vast pastoral areas (the snow is "swept" by the wind and accumulates massively in snowdrifts on the edges of plateaus and in sheltered valleys, resulting in snowdrifts that generally linger until May or June in the highest parts). Added to this are local nuances caused by the internal and external layout of the relief:

- the north-western part of the Cézallier, in the absence of any other mountainous formation blocking the disturbances coming from the south-west – apart from the distant and therefore not very influential Pyrenees – is the wettest part (accumulations of around 150 cm/year);
- conversely, the southern Cézallier benefits from the foehn effect created by the Cantal mountains, resulting in a relative dryness (around 100 cm/year) and an increase in summer thunderstorms in the total accumulation (continental trend);
- in the central part (Signal du Luguet, Mont Chamaroux), the "Cantalien foehn" effect decreases from south to north and, thanks to its highest altitude and wide opening to the west, benefits from high precipitation (120 to 150 cm/year) and the most abundant snow cover;
- finally, the entire eastern slope is subject to the foehn effect of the Haut Cézallier, with a rapid decrease in rainfall (from 120 to less than 80 cm/year) and a marked rise in average temperatures as you approach the Limagne plain and the Alagnon valley, with its continental or even Mediterranean characteristics.

=== Fauna and flora ===
The vegetation reflects the contrasts in climate. The central and north-western regions, home to verdant estives, heather and bilberry moors, post-glacial peat bogs and beech forests (more rarely fir or spruce plantations) typical of the Atlantic mountains, give way to a drier landscape as you move south and east, home to oaks, Scots pines and pseudo-garrigues.

The wide open spaces of the Cézallier are ideal hunting grounds for birds of prey. The deep wooded gorges provide safe havens. Tawny owls, barn owls and long-eared owls are numerous. There are also eagle owls, which prefer rocky areas. Diurnal birds of prey include common buzzards, black kites, grey harriers and kestrels. Red kites and short-toed eagles are rarer.

Wild mammals include marmots, red deer and chamois.

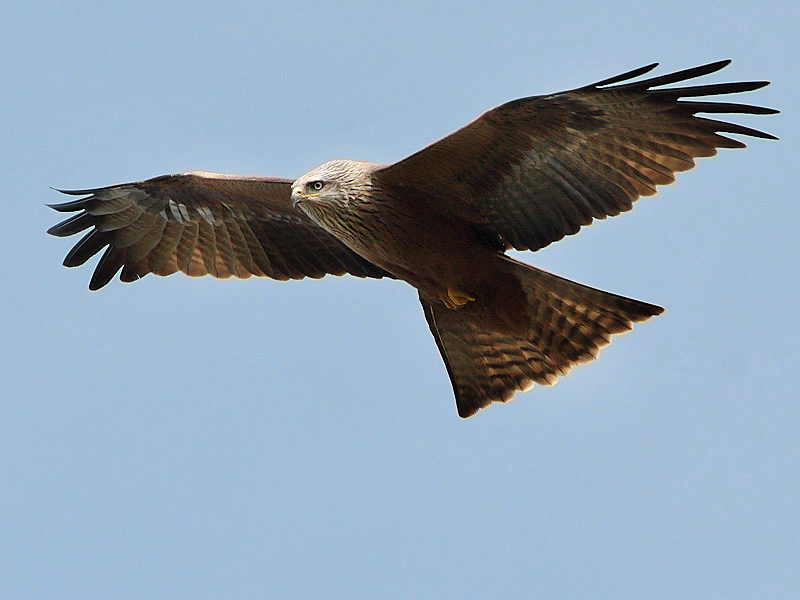
Black Milan.

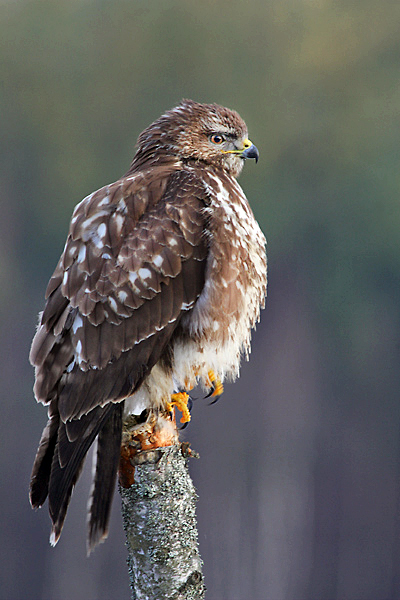
Common buzzard.

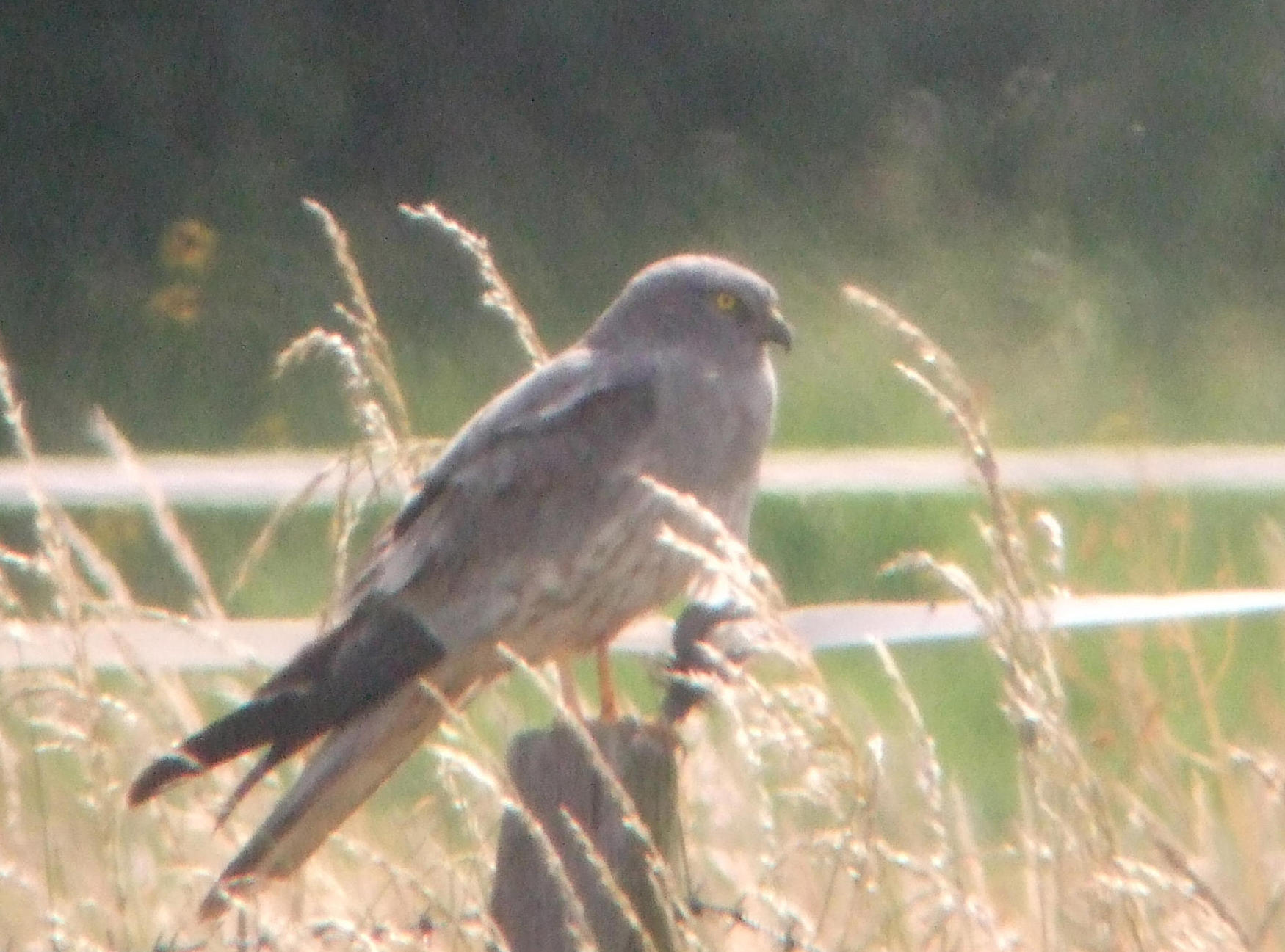
Montagu's harrier.

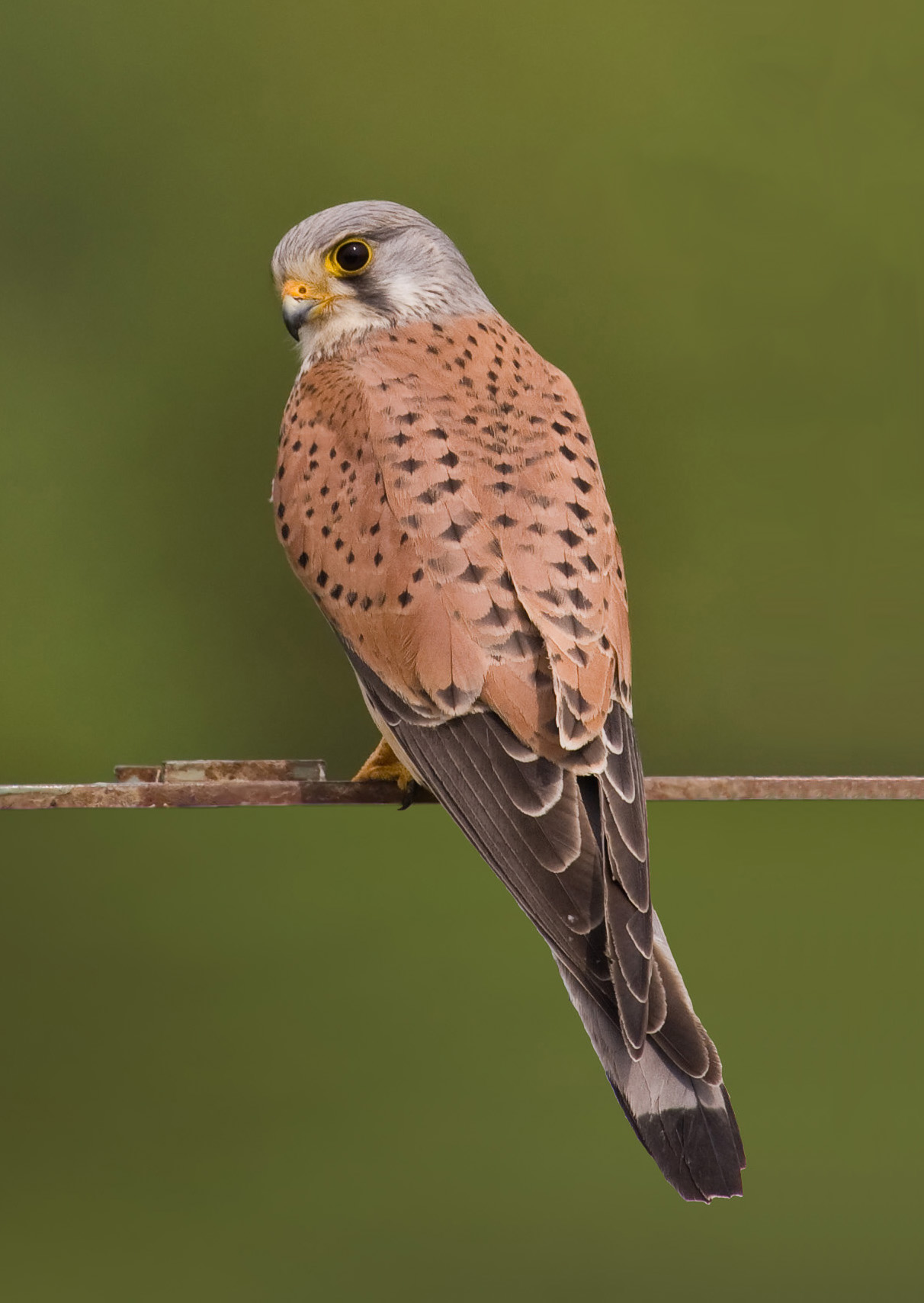
Kestrel.

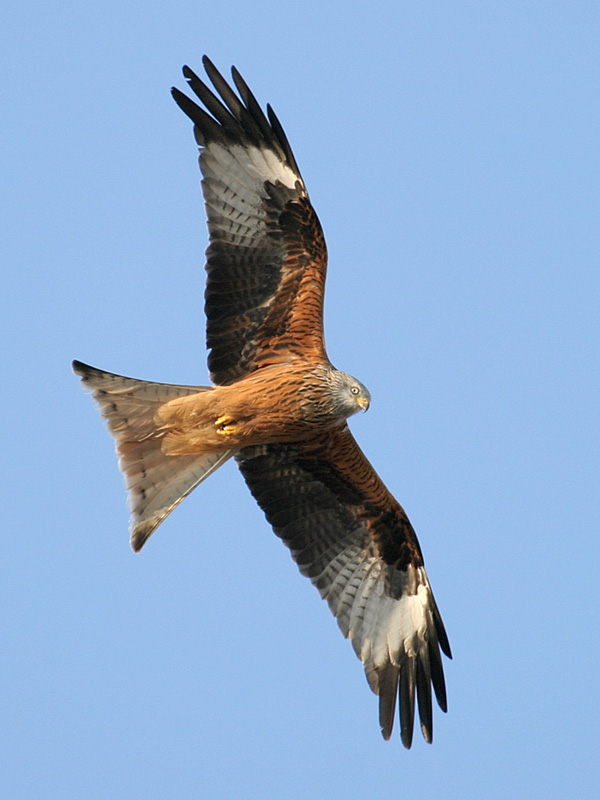
Red kite.

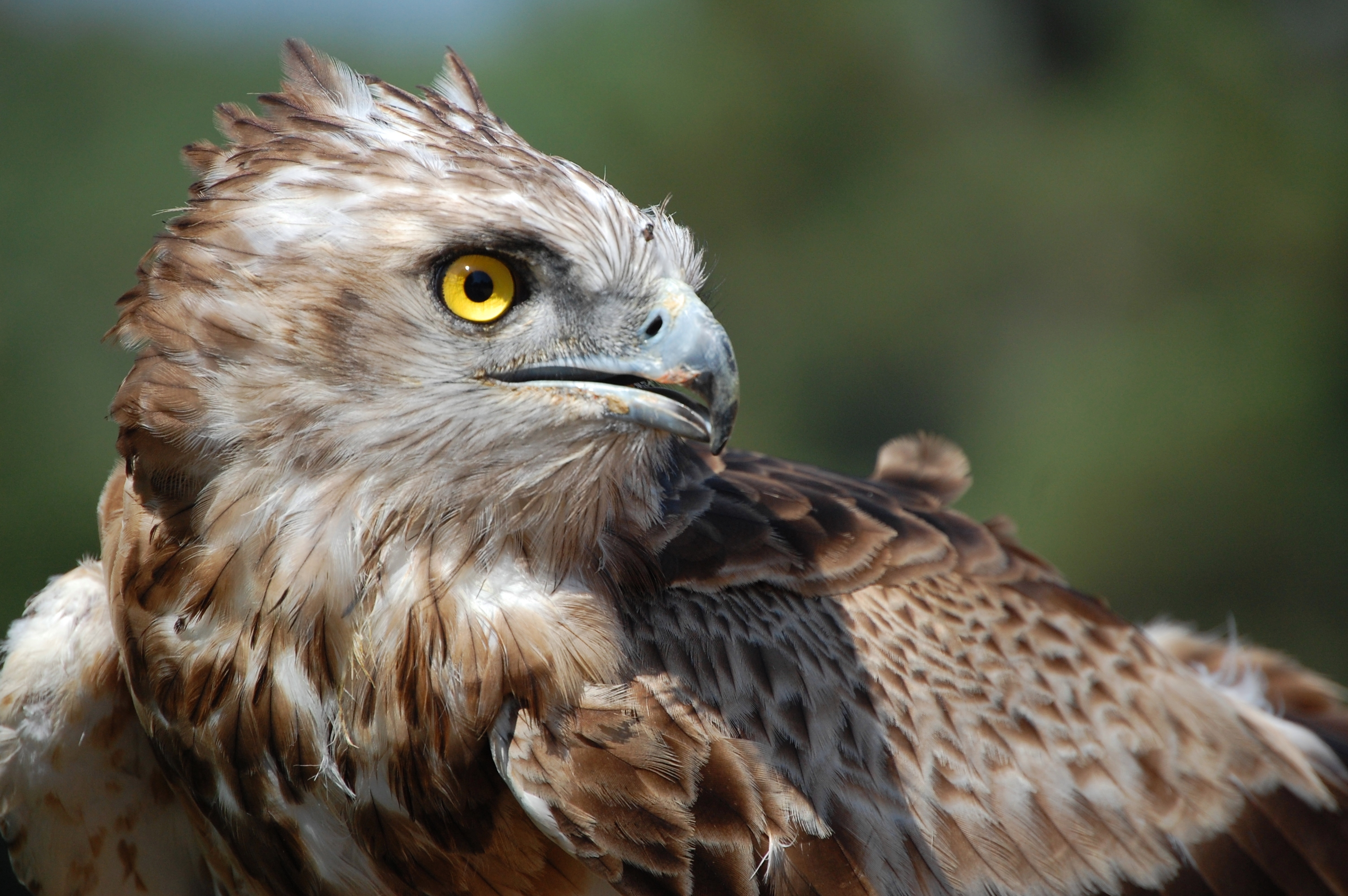
Short-toed Eagle.

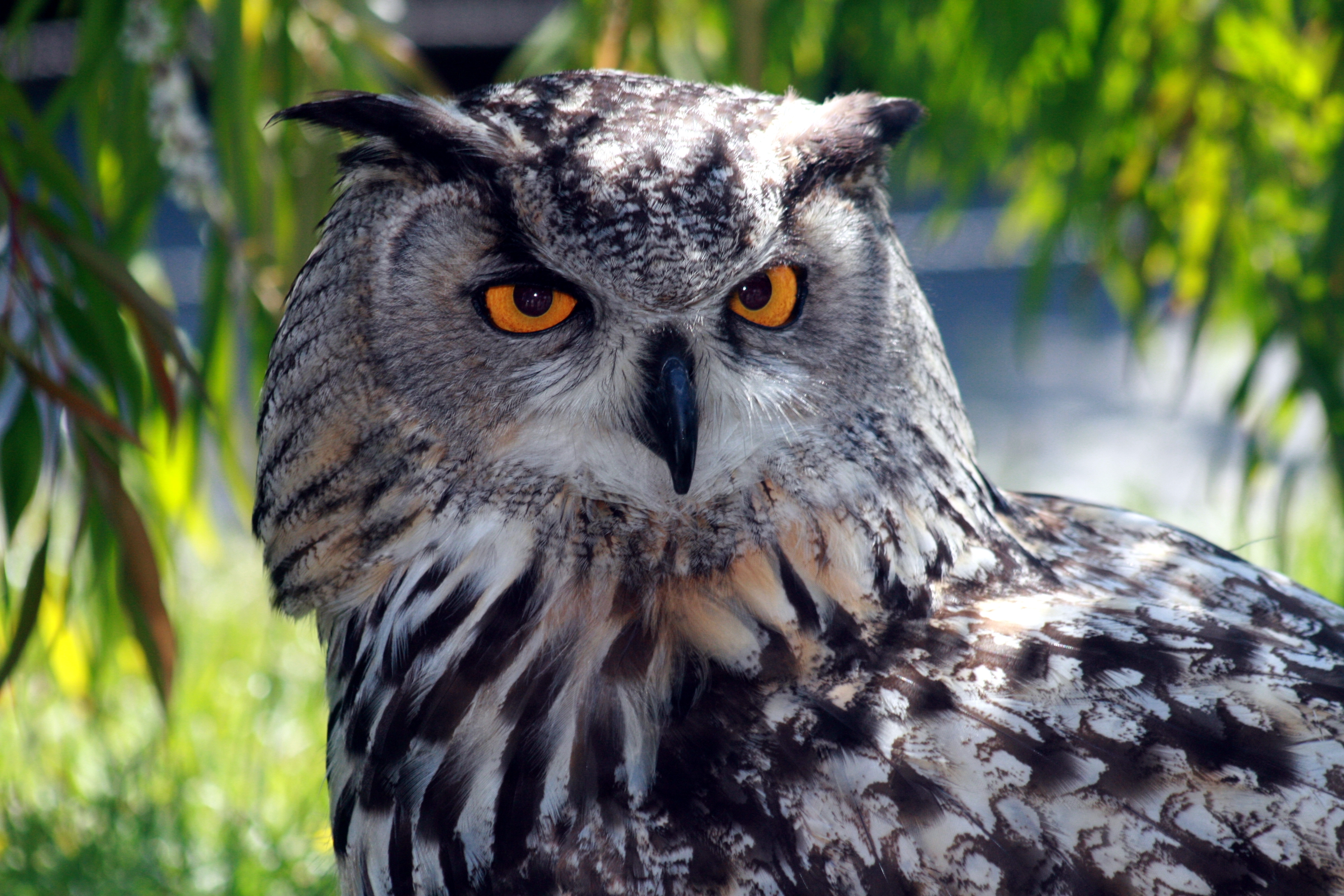
Long-eared owls.

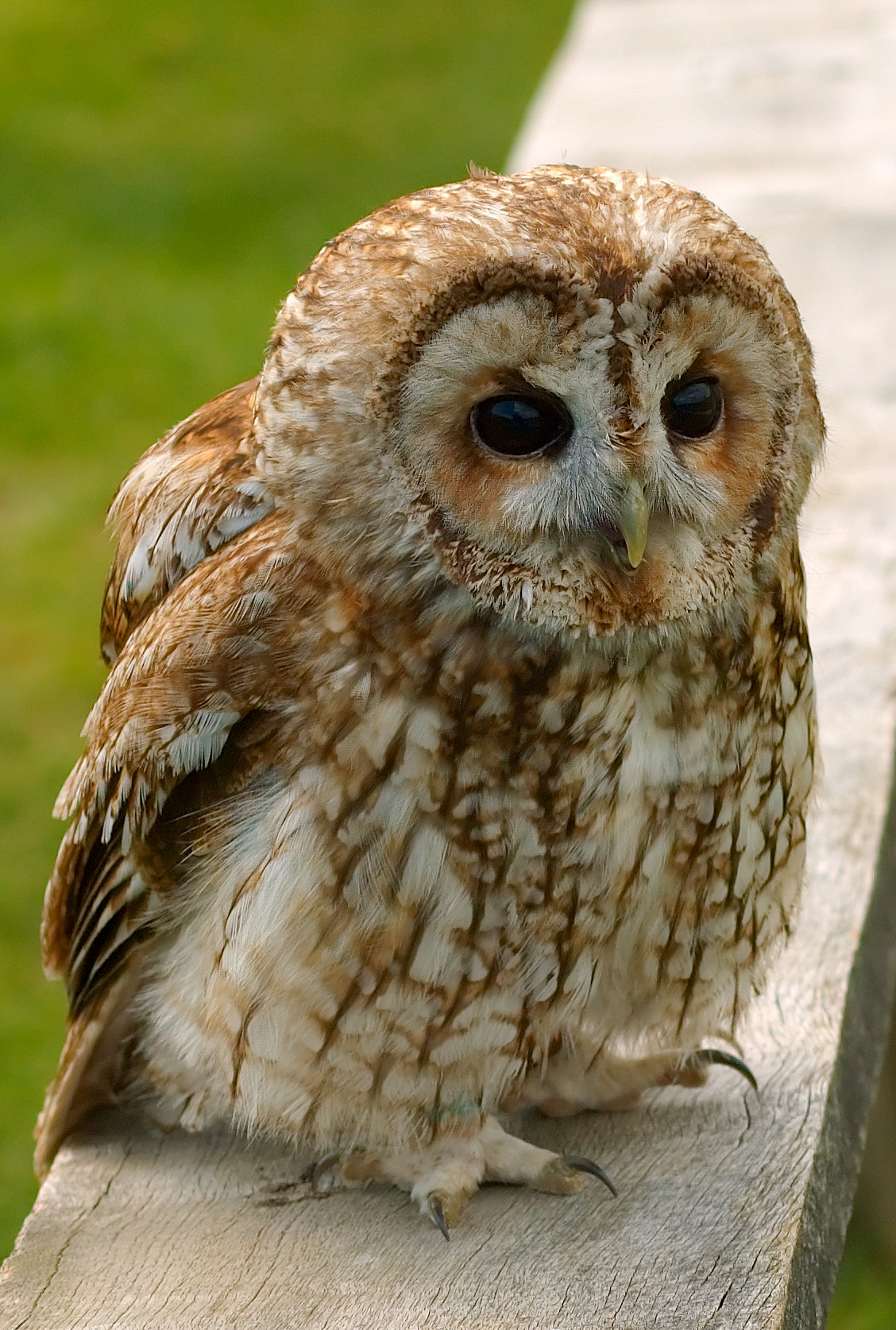
Tawny owl.

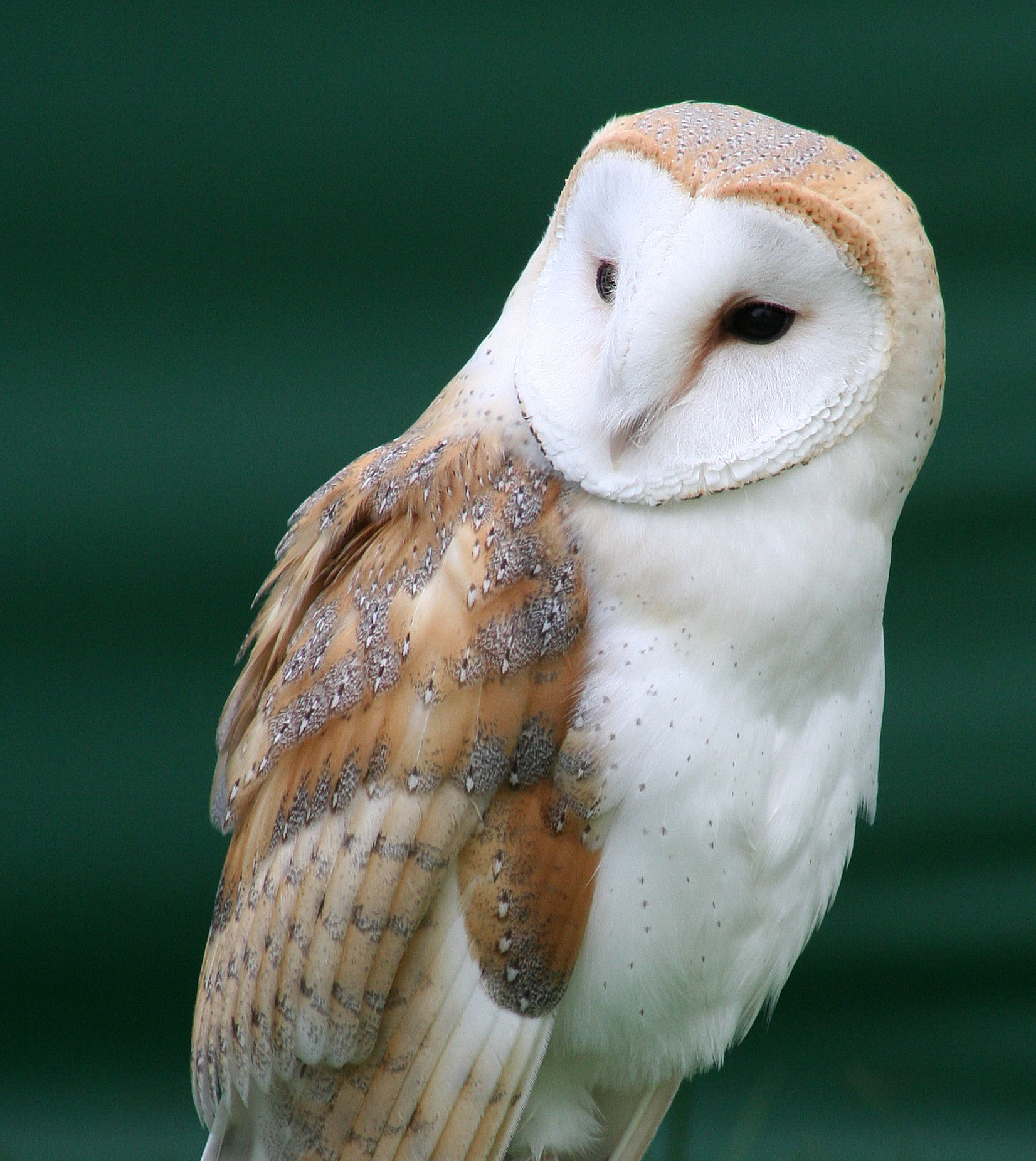
Barn Owl.

The Cézallier's rugged topography is characterized by significant differences in altitude. This explains why there are such wide variations in climate over such short distances. Vegetation varies according to exposure. Subalpine meadows cover the Cézallier. Here, huge herds of Salers cows spend the summer in summer pasture. Until the 1980s, these herds used the railway line to climb up to the mountain pastures. The train transported up to 10,000 head of cattle each summer. These vast meadows are home to yellow gentian, knapweed, orchids, bluebells, wild pansy, potentilla, mountain arnica, brunelle, bedstraw, martagon lily and pulsatilla anemone.

The montane zone is limited to the gorges. Beech forests occupy the colder slopes, while the hillsides are covered with moorland, oak coppice and Scots pine.

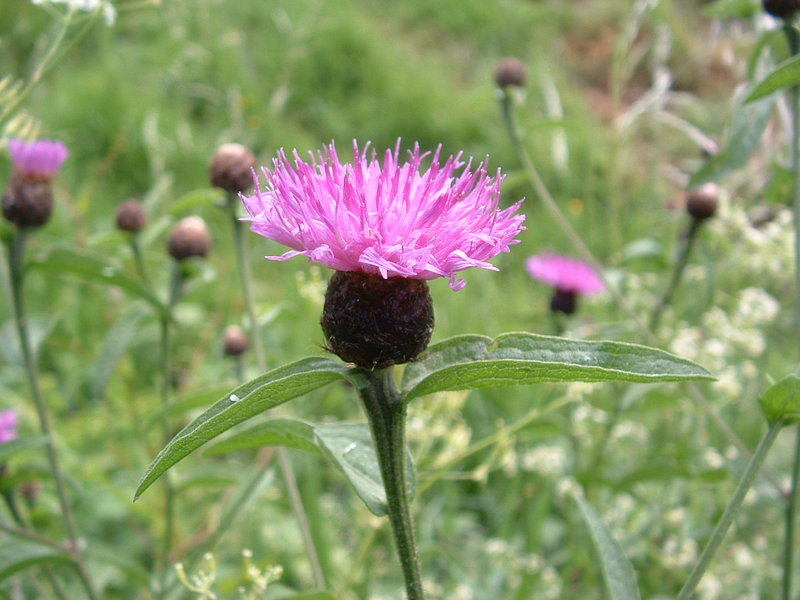
Centaurea jacea.

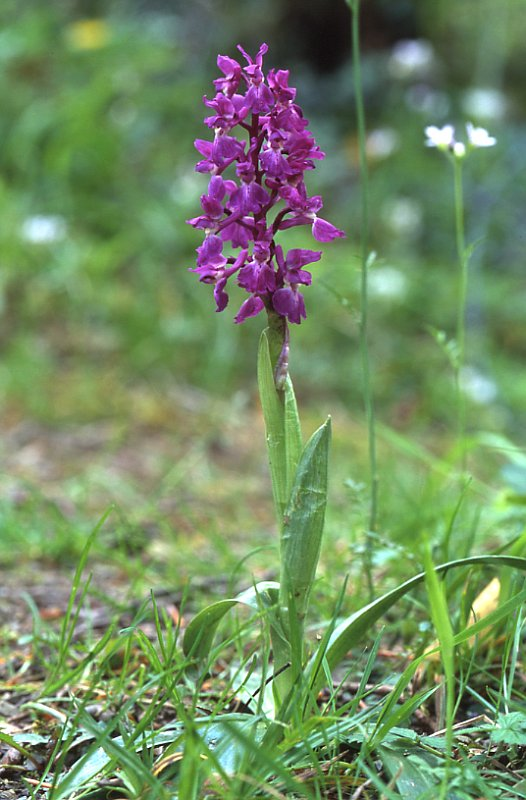
Orchid.

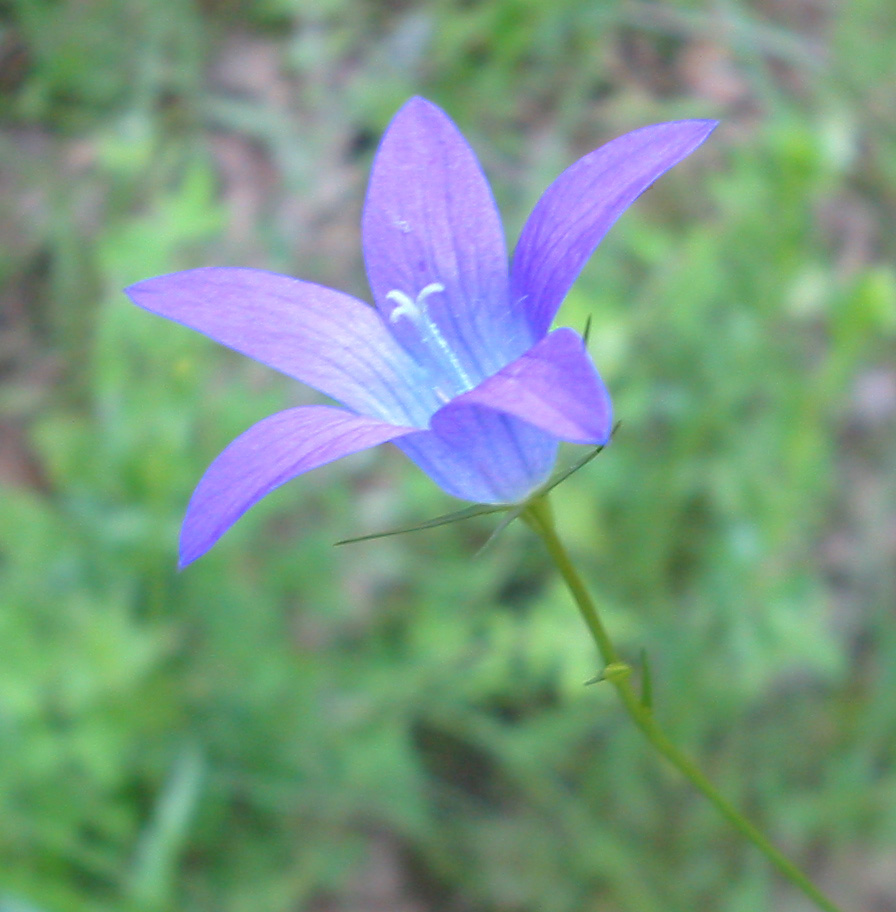
Campanula.

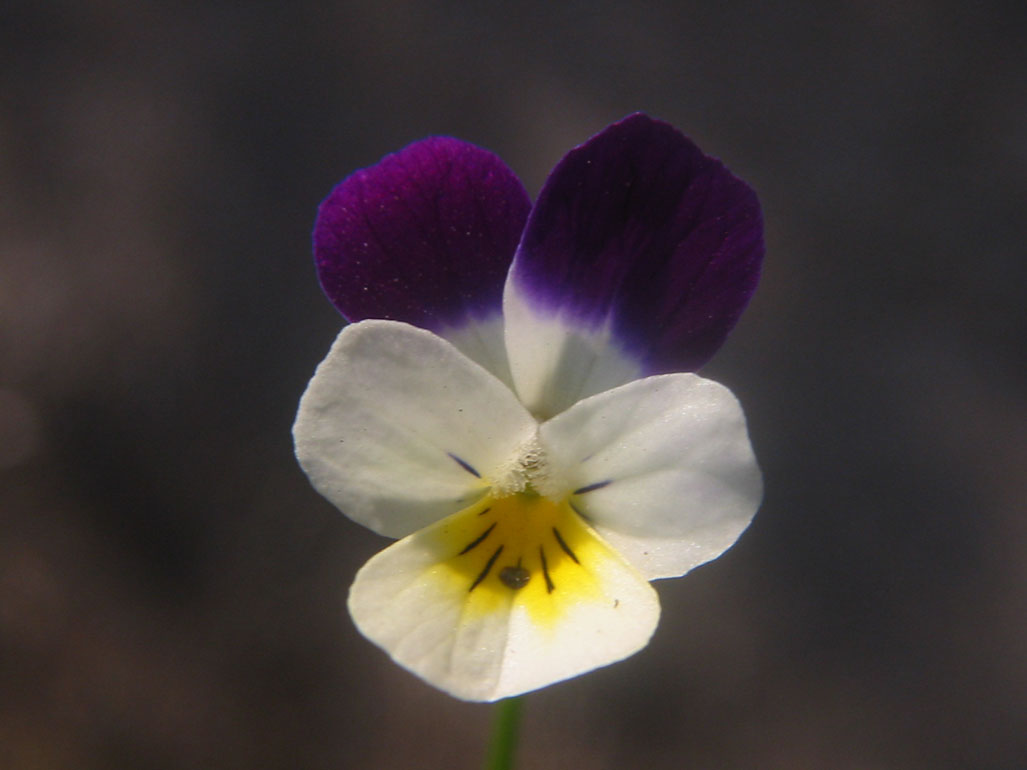
Pansy.

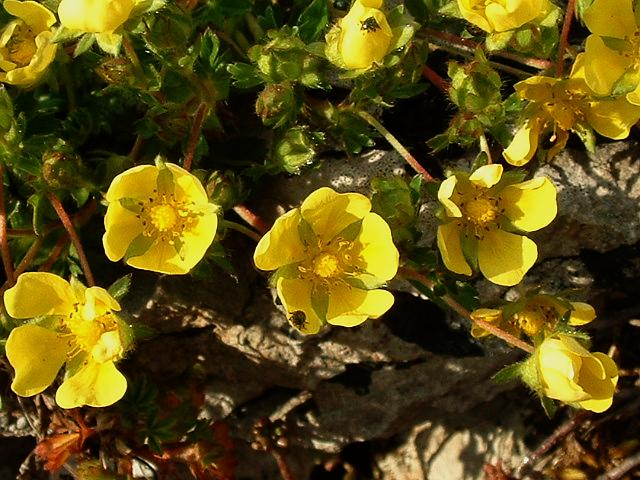
Potentilla.

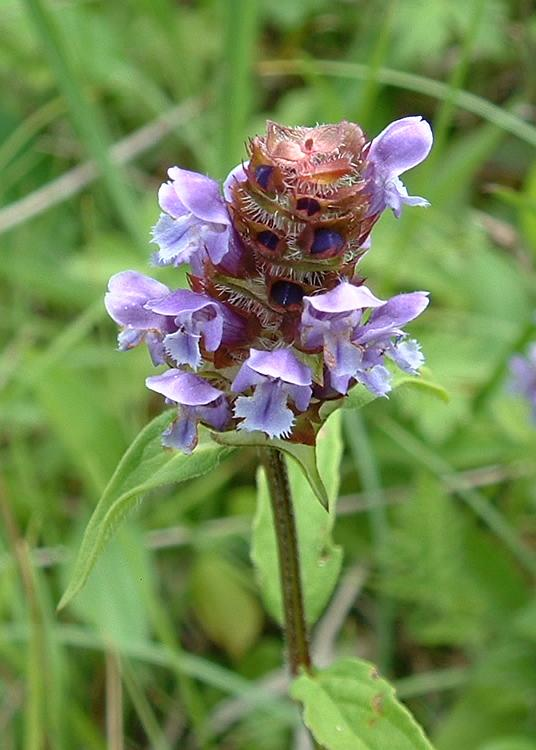
Brunelle.

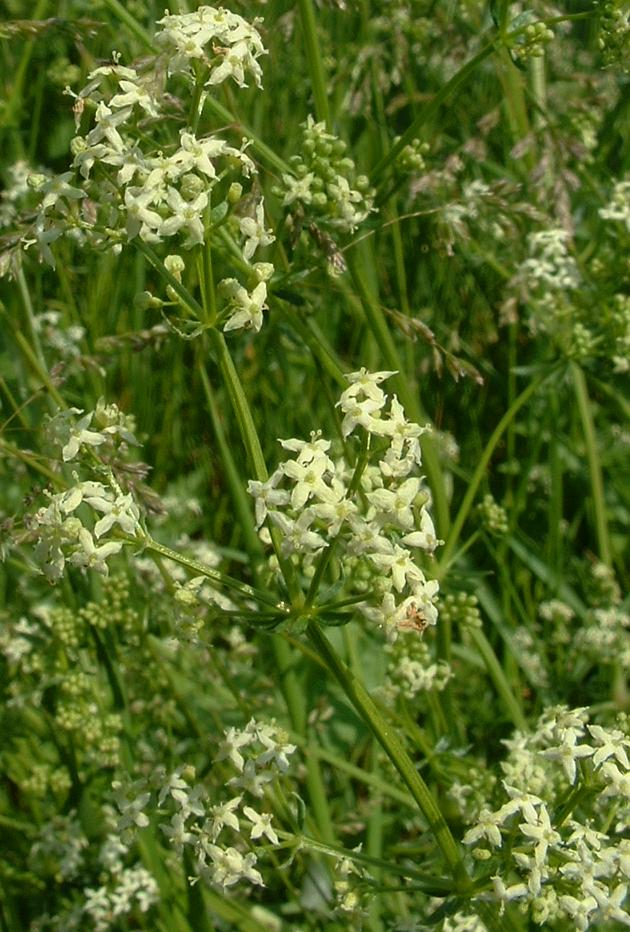
White bedstraw.

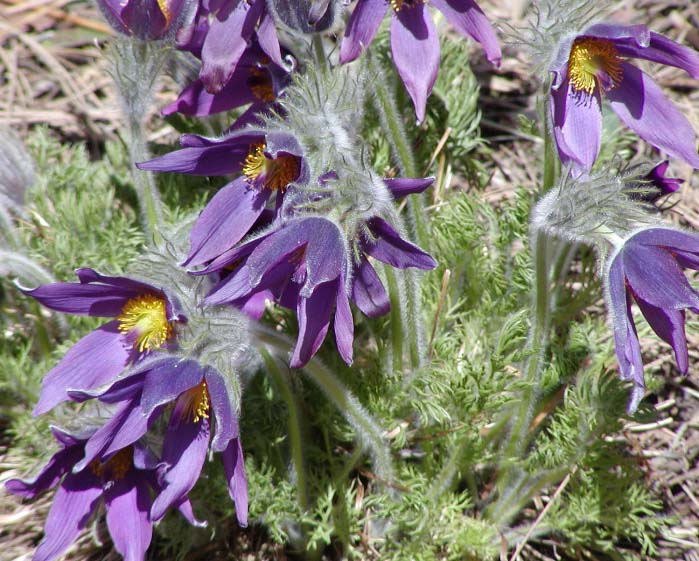
Pulsatile Anemone.

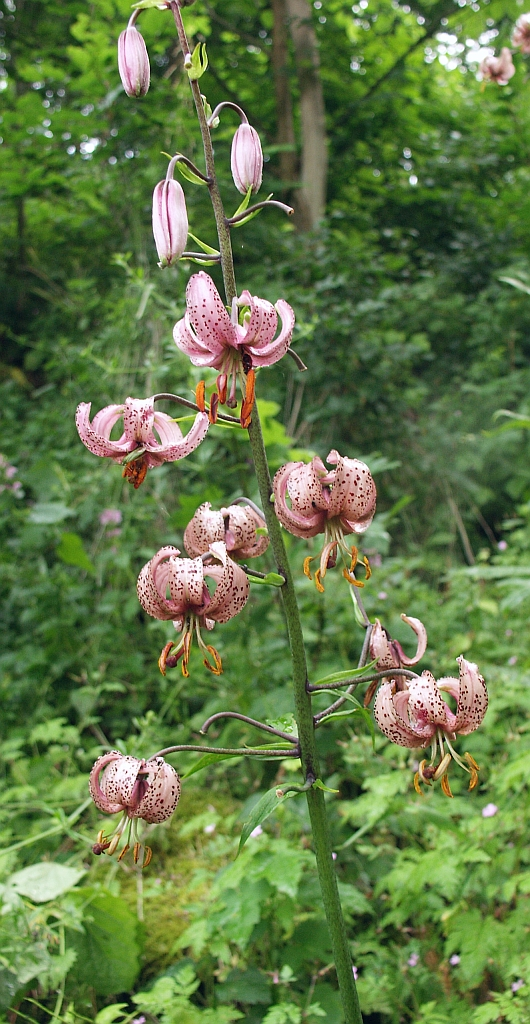
Martagon lily.

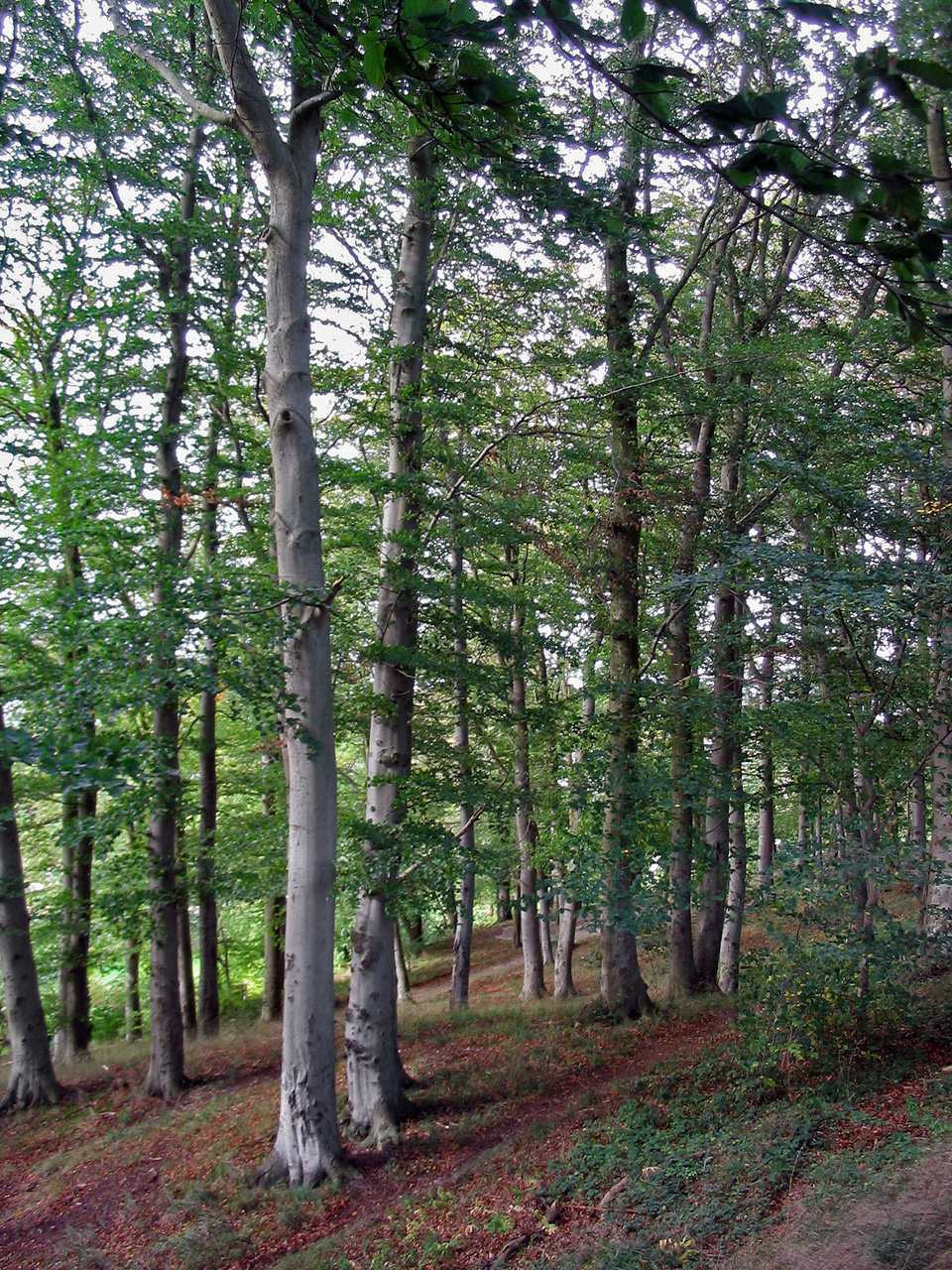
Beech.

==== Peat bogs of the Cézallier ====
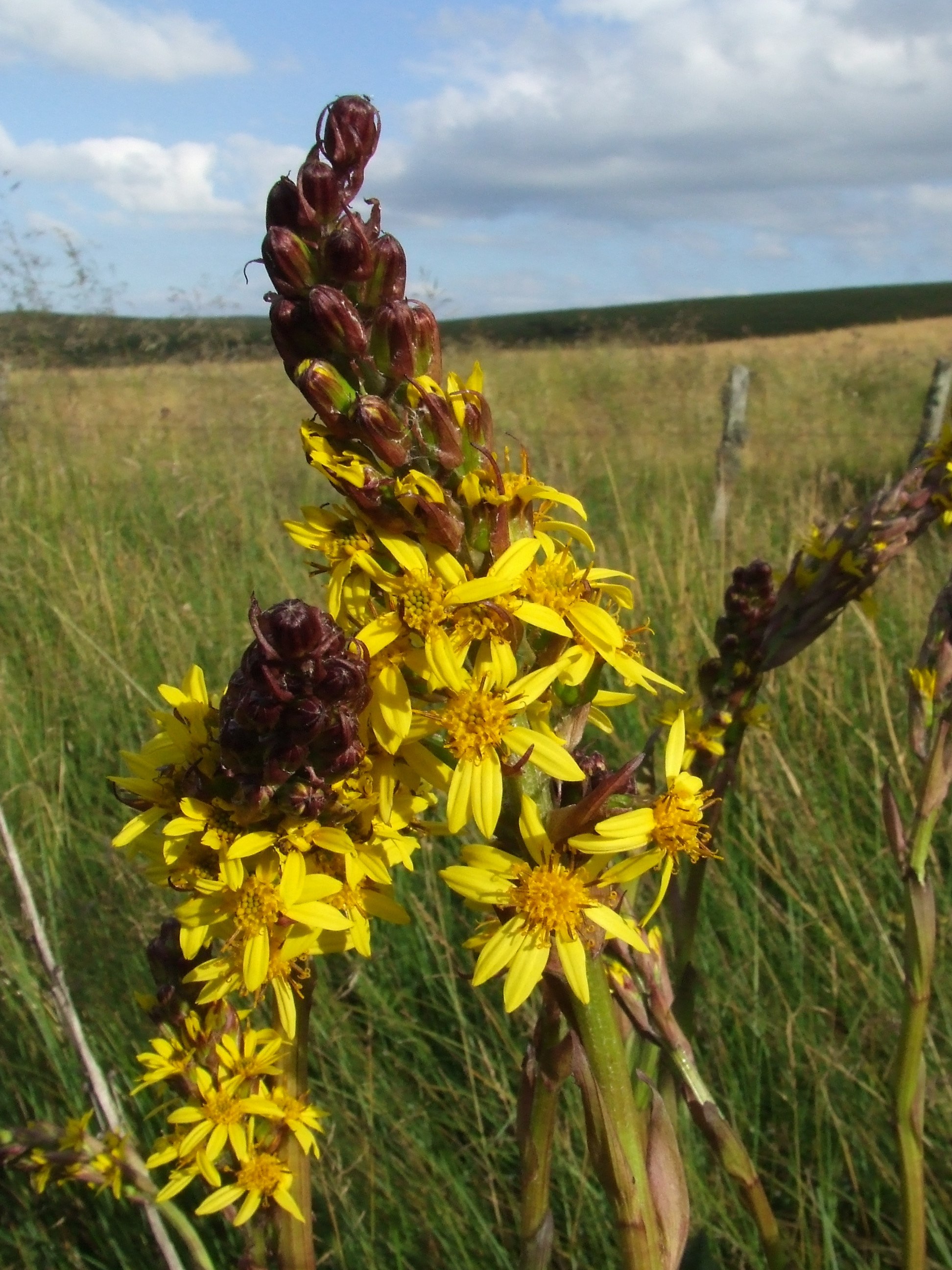
Ligularia sibirica.

The cool, wet climate of the Cézallier, combined with the relief inherited from volcanism and glacial erosion (sunken basins), has led to the development of numerous peat bogs. The icy winter puts an end to the vegetative period, which is limited to the summer season. Evaporation from the surface causes the water to cool at depth. The water temperature can reach 0 °C on certain summer nights, restricting the normal decomposition process of dead plant material (the principle of peat accumulation).

In the last century and during the war, peat bogs were exploited by man. Peat clods were extracted, dried in the open air and burned in stoves in winter. This gentle exploitation was not destructive, as the bog had time to reconstitute itself. Two peat bogs are still industrially exploited for horticultural purposes at Landeyrat and Picherande.

Some peat bogs are home to rare flora and fauna, notably the yellow-flowered Siberian lousewort. They are protected by measures such as the Sagnes de La Godivelle national nature reserve.

== History ==
=== Bronze and Iron Ages ===
Between 2500 and 1500 BC, man began to colonize the Cézallier region. They came from the Alagnon and Allier valleys and gradually cleared the forest with fire. The land was transformed into pasture for sheep.

The men of this era left burial mounds and tombs in their wake. The deceased were first cremated, then a low stone wall was built around the hearth, followed by offerings and, finally, a mound of earth. The largest burials, the tumuli, are around 15 m in diameter; they were reserved for the most important people (undoubtedly the chiefs). Ordinary people were buried in smaller tombs, known as tombelles, which were around 5 m in diameter.

The Cézallier region is home to the largest concentration of this type of funerary monument in France. In some places (Bonnac, Laurie or La Rochette), they form veritable necropolises. Often, tumuli were also used to mark territory and ensure protection of the land by the god of the dead during the winter season.

Regional archaeologist Alphonse Vinatié has studied this type of monument extensively. He discovered objects used as offerings (pottery, jewelry, etc.) from far-flung regions of Gaul (Aquitaine, Franche-Comté).

=== The Middle Ages ===
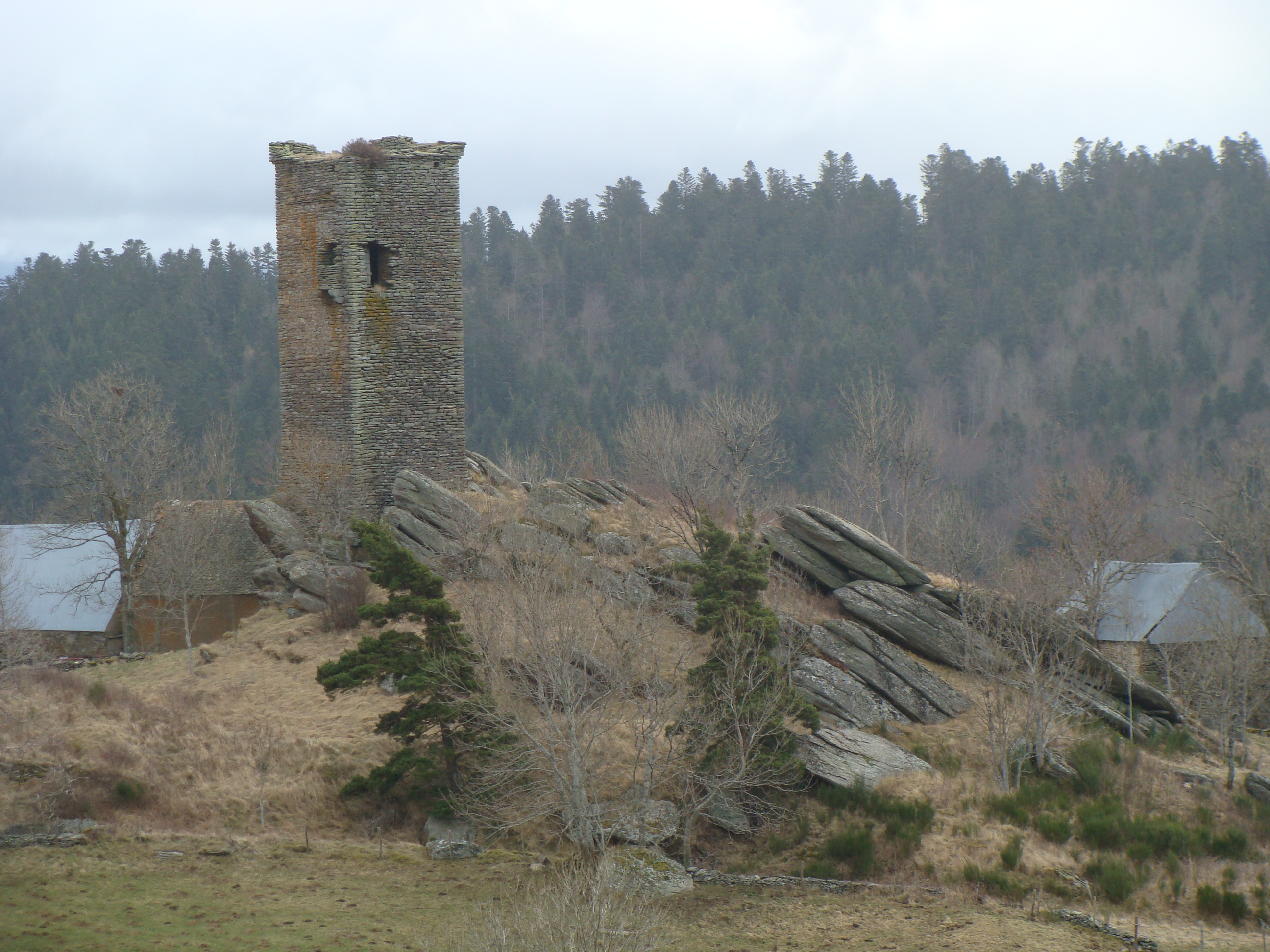

Around the year 1000, the region, far removed from the tutelary power of the Dukes of Aquitaine, was the object of much armed violence due to rivalries between local lords.

At the same time, monks finished clearing the Cézallier uplands for pasture. The old landowners and the new conquerors clashed. To assert their power and rights, the lords quickly built "châteaux-mottes". These castles consisted of a mound surrounded by ditches, a wooden palisade and a vast central tower, also made of wood (Le Luguet, Chavagnac, Peyrusse).

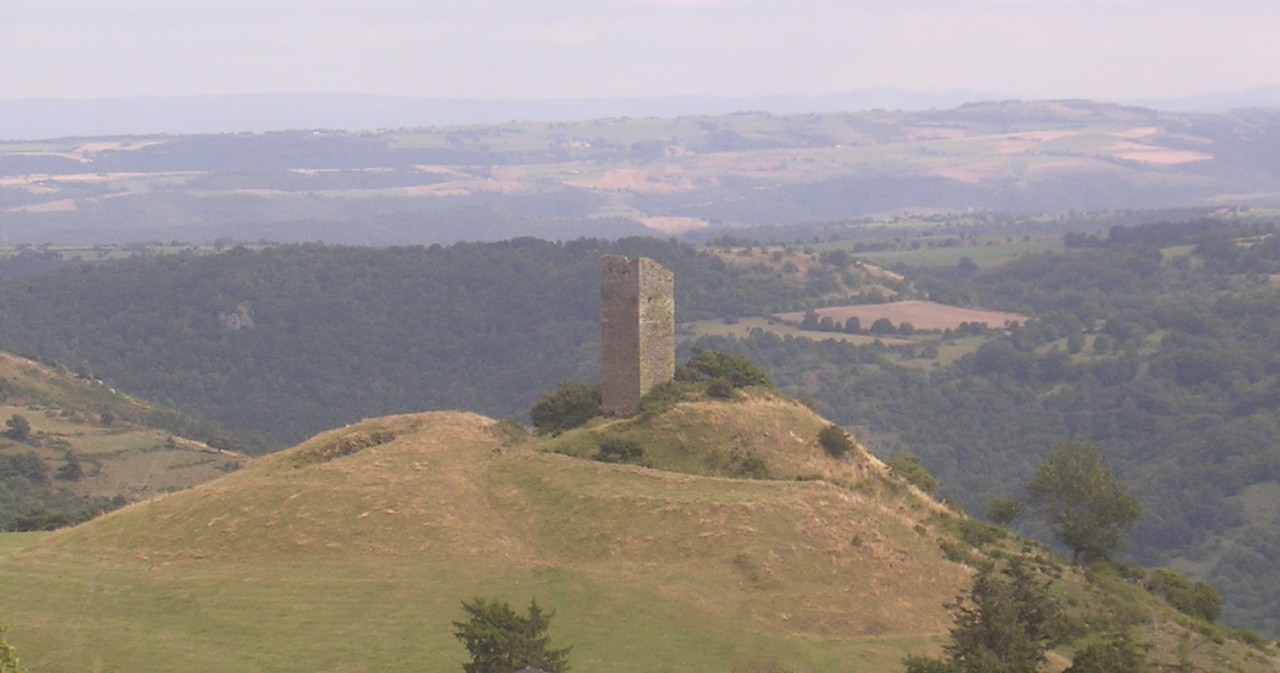

In the 13th century, the wooden towers were replaced by new stone ones. These towers were sometimes used as living quarters. In such cases, they housed the lord's representative. Local historian Gérard Chevassus has listed their main characteristics: they are square or rectangular in cross-section, with only small openings on the sides. The first floor was used as a grain silo, and the entrance was on the second level. Their defensive function disappeared, but they continued to be used to represent the lord's power. These towers were often the starting point for the creation of a village.

Among the best preserved are the Leyvaux tower, the Colombine tower in Molèdes, the Besse tower in Anzat-le-Luguet and the Ally tower in Massiac, which was converted into a church tower.

Also in the 13th century, the remains of a medieval village crossed by three ancient roads were found, as well as vast sheep pens around the present-day burons of Troucou and Villeneuve-bas (Vèze). These testify to the use of pastures in this part of the Cézallier.

In the 14th century, the forest cover of the Cantal and Cézallier mountains was increasingly under threat, and the pastoral zone gradually replaced the original beech forest.

=== Modern times ===
In the 15th century, the first seasonal dwellings for shepherds on the estives appeared in the form of huts. The presence of a priory near Allanche is attested to as early as the 16th century. In the 17th century, the mountains were attached to estates belonging to noble and middle-class families, and large areas of estives were created.

=== 19th century: a time of burons ===
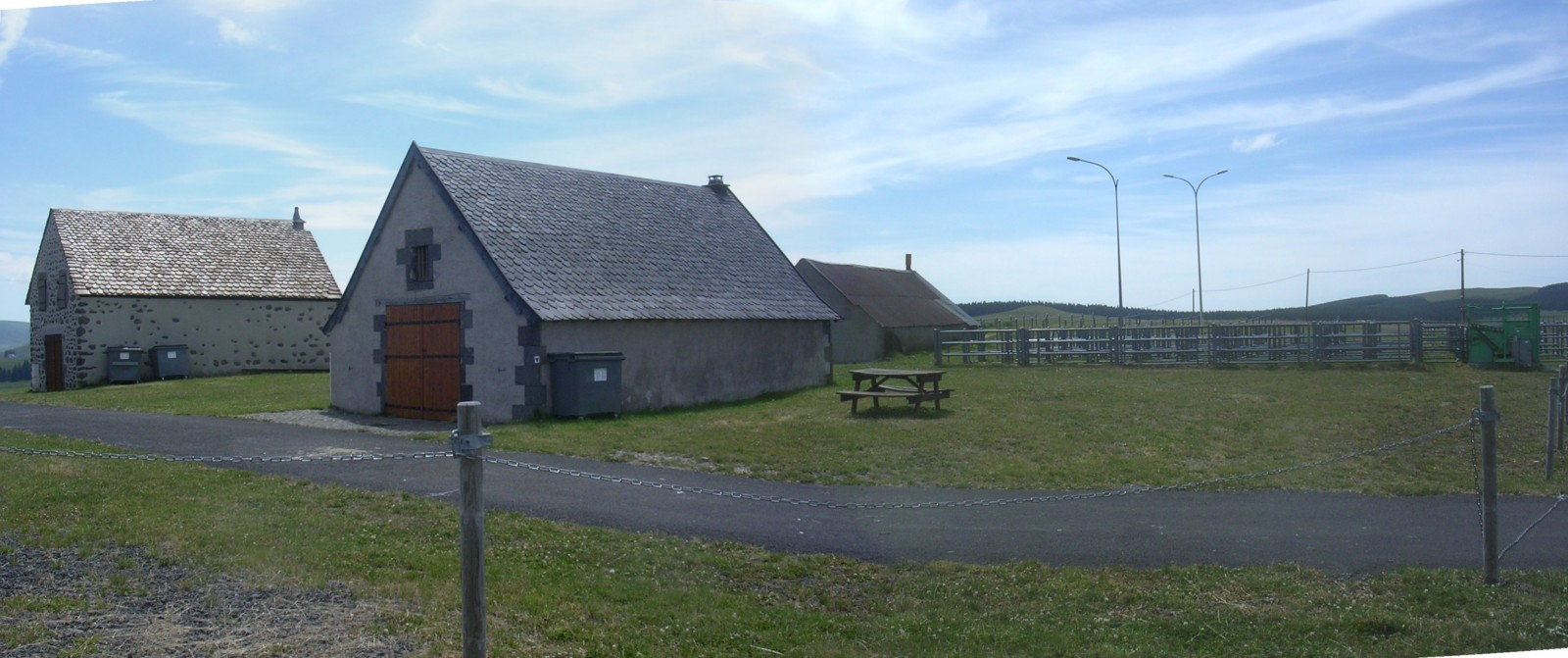
The Brion cabins.

The revolutionary period brought little change, and the bourgeoisie even took advantage of it to increase its role and possessions. The main features of pastoral activity continued to develop. At the same time, there was a proliferation of stone burons to house the cowherd's team and the cheese-making workshop. In 1826, Abbé de Pradt tried to introduce Swiss bulls onto his properties near Pradiers, with the aim of crossing them with Salers females. No breeders followed him. By 1850, the golden age of the large Cantalian-style farm had been reached (Salers breeding, summer pastures, cheese-making in the buron), but pastoral activity remained unchanged, still characterized by the land holdings of large landowners. In 1860, new equipment distributed by the Cantal Agricultural Society made its appearance in the Cézallier mountains, transforming cheese-making in the burons: tome press, tome-breaking mill, iron fourme press.

From time immemorial, the Cézallier has supplied numerous peddlers who would descend on the "bas pays" to offer their sheets, blankets, and various utensils. They unpacked at fairs and markets, went door-to-door, and rented stalls under market halls. Some of these temporary migrants settled in their home province – notably Brittany. This fairground trade lasted until the middle of the 20th century.

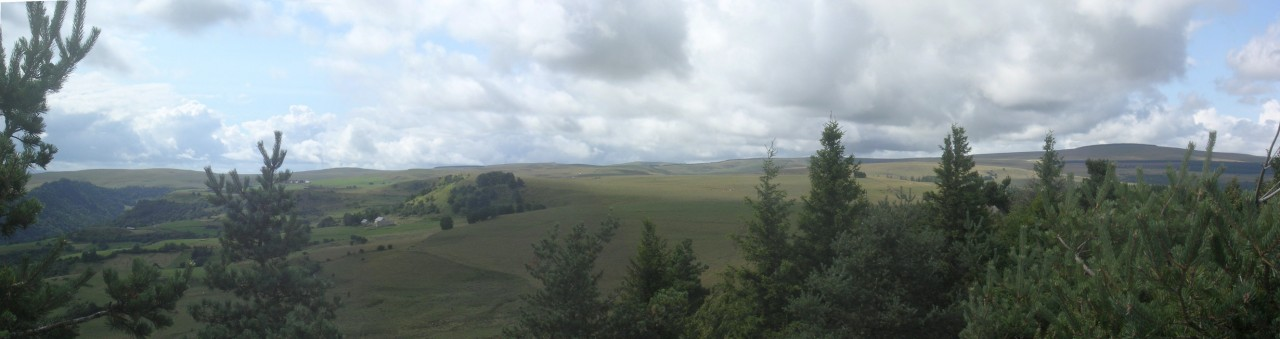
Panorama of the Sianne valley and the Signal du Luguet from the Brèches de Jignol.

==== Mining fever in the Anzat area ====
In the first third of the 19th century, a mining fever swept through the Cézallier region and its surrounding valleys. The Anzat-le-Luguet antimony mine was discovered in 1814 by Jean d'Auzat Bertier, who was granted a concession on January 10, 1821, by royal decree. At the same time and on the same site, a concession was granted in 1837 for the Bosberty silver and arsenic mine, located at the ends of the communes of Anzat-le-Luguet and Molèdes, for which a small ore processing plant was built. Over a three-year period, three thousand quintals of arsenic ore were extracted.

==== 20th century ====
===== The dawn of change =====
In 1910, herds from the Aurillac basin arrived at Allanche and Landeyrat stations via the Neussargues-Bort-les-Orgues railroad line. Part of the transhumance is now carried out by rail from the Aurillac station. In 1940, the Cantal prefecture instituted an official market for ant production, to control collection and trade. Three markets were set up in the Cézallier, at Allanche, Marcenat, and Montgreleix. From 1941, Cantal production had to be taken to market, and wholesalers were forbidden to buy directly from farmers. In 1948, there were still around a thousand burons in operation in the Cantal region, some fifteen of them not far from the Sianne and its tributaries.

The gradual disappearance of the old mountain way of life became apparent in the 1950s. A new mountain economy took shape. With the crisis in production, the burons began to disappear, and the milk mountains were no longer as prosperous. The production of cheese at the buron no longer offset the cost of the summer pastures. In 1954, the overproduction of dairy and farmhouse cheeses was exacerbated by production outside the Cantal department, as the territory of origin of Cantal cheese production was not legally defined.

===== The end of a pastoral system =====
1955 saw the beginning of a period of massive closure of the burons. Recruitment became increasingly difficult, with few men willing to work 140 days. Made inevitable by the economic situation and encouraged by the agricultural authorities, the disappearance of the old pastoral system accelerated. In 1956, Fourme du Cantal cheese was awarded the AOC (Appellation d'origine contrôlée) label, but sales continued to decline.

In the early 1960s, the reconquest of highland pastures was once again on the agenda, thanks to the expansion of the livestock market to Italy and the government's policy of supporting beef production. The role of the mountain pastures returned to prominence, supported by new breeding systems, but the loosening of the links between the mountain pastures and the surrounding agricultural territory became irreversible. In 1963, the Coopérative cantalienne de transhumance (COPTASA) was created, bringing together 1,126 hectares of Pradiers and the surrounding area, with the Paillassère-Bas buron overlooking the sources of the Sianne as its technical center. In 1968, the SNCF closed the "Far West" line that brought thousands of animals to Allanche and Landeyrat every year for the summer pastures. Transhumance by truck to the summering grounds became the norm.

===== Intensive farming =====
At the beginning of the 1970s, the average size of private property in the Cézallier was 38 hectares, which still corresponds closely to the area once required for a cow barn. By 1975, the Cézallier mountains were being farmed intensively by heifers and beef cattle, requiring mountain development and access, fencing, fertilization, controlled watering of livestock and centralized monitoring of animals put out to pasture.

In the 1980s, the Cézallier mountains were revitalized as more and more animals were brought in from neighboring regions such as Aubrac and Aveyron. In 1984, the introduction of milk quotas to reduce surpluses in Europe dealt the final blow to pastoral activity, the burons and the fourme d'estive. By 1990, transhumance from outside the Cantal represented almost half of the livestock summered in the Auvergne mountains.

== Activities ==
The Brion fair (hamlet in the commune of Compains), a livestock fair on the estives.

=== Tourism ===
Although the region is still well preserved and offers exceptional scenery, tourism is only a sideline.

Activities include cycle touring, velorail, fishing in streams and lakes, equitation (Chalinargues riding center) and, of course, hiking:(GR 30, GR 4), and several circuits such as the "Tour du Cézallier" and the "Circuit des Vaches Rouges".

Other attractions include

- the "vélo-rail" at Allanche and the tourist train at Riom-es-Montagnes on the old Neussargues-Bort railroad;
- the lightning museum at Marcenat;
- the Auvergne animal park at Ardes;
- the Parrot cross-country ski center, not far from Anzat-le-Luguet.
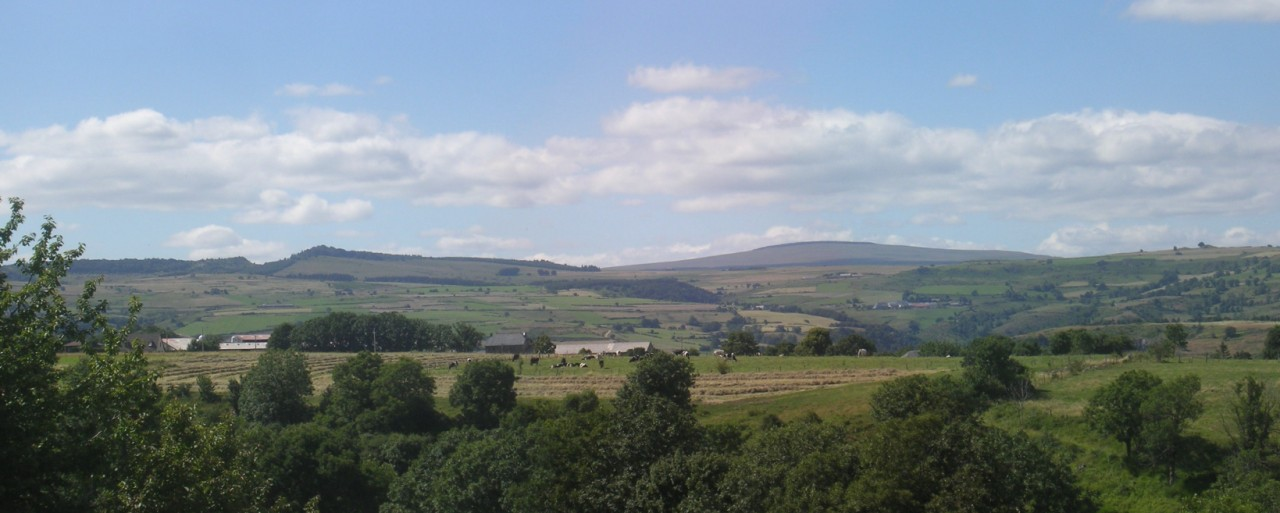
  Les Brèches de Jignol and Signal du Luguet.

=== Agriculture and local economy ===
The Cézallier highlands are almost exclusively devoted to cattle breeding. In summer, the mountains are dotted with huge herds of reddish-brown cows characteristic of the Salers breed, as well as the Aubrac, Montbéliarde and Abondancebreeds. Production is for both meat and milk.

In the summer pastures, shepherds used to process the milk on site in burons, a method that has now disappeared.

The Cézallier is part of theappellation d'origine contrôlée area for Saint-Nectaire cheese. In exceptional cases, disused railroads are used to bring herds up to the summer pastures.

=== Energy ===
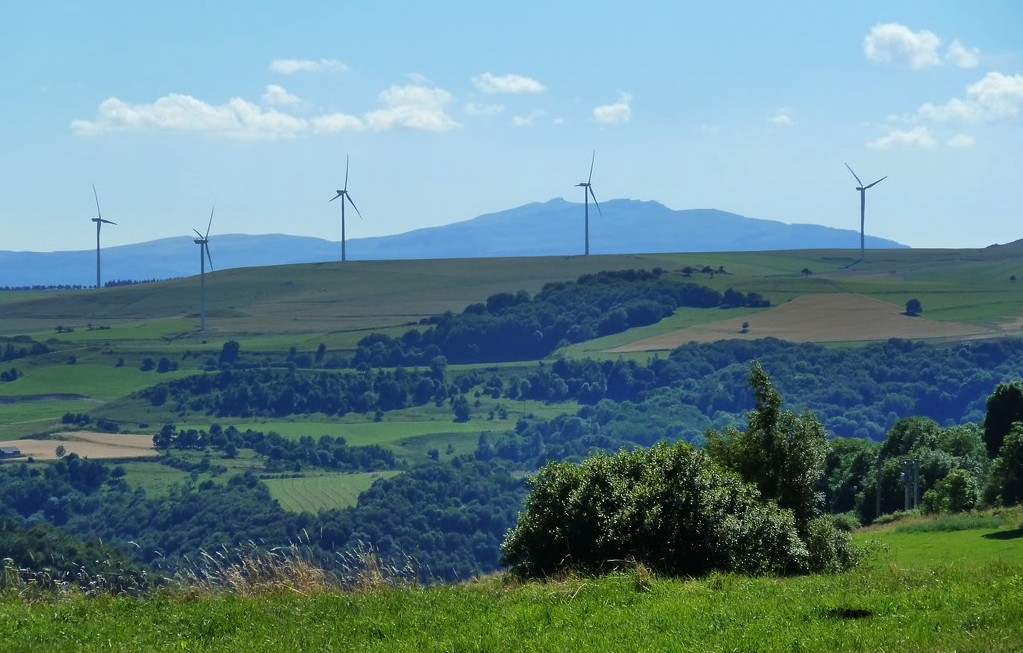
The puy de Mathonière wind turbines block the view of the Cantal mountains.

In recent years, the Auvergne regional council has put in place an ambitious wind power development plan, in which the Cézallier region figures prominently. Several wind farms equipped with large-scale machines (around 130 meters) are under construction. Fourteen projects are under study or in the pipeline. One of the most imposing is located near the small town of Ardes.

This type of development is opposed by those who believe that the region's future lies more in tourism and small-scale agriculture than in industry. Several environmental protection associations in Massiac, Peyrusse and Ardes-sur-Couze are trying to oppose these projects.

In addition, by order of the Ministers of Ecological Transition and Economy, Finance and Recovery, a permit to explore for high-temperature geothermal deposits covering some 729 km2 (Cantal, Haute-Loire and Puy-de-Dôme) has been granted, until July 22, 2022, to a company. Laurent Radisson explains that the ultimate aim is "to exploit a high-temperature geothermal deposit by means of a geothermal power plant, operating on the principle of a 'geothermal doublet'. The power plant will be fed by a production well that will extract geothermal water at a temperature in excess of 150 °C from deep, naturally fissured zones. The cooled fluid will be reinjected, via a second well, into the reservoir tapped at a temperature of 60 °C. The wells will be drilled to depths of between 3,500 and 5,000 metres.

=== Environmental protection ===
The Cézalier mountains are part of the Parc Naturel Régional des Volcans d'Auvergne.
