= Peyrusse (disambiguation) =

Peyrusse can refer to:

- Peyrusse, commune in Cantal department, France
- Peyrusse-Grande, commune in Gers department, France
- Peyrusse-le-Roc, commune in Aveyron department, France
- Peyrusse-Massas, commune in Gers department, France
- Peyrusse-Vieille, commune in Gers department, France
