= Veze =

Veze may refer to:

- Vèze, Cantal, commune in south-central France
- La Vèze, commune in eastern France
- Vèze (bagpipe), played in Poitou
