= Lac de Montcineyre =

Lake in France

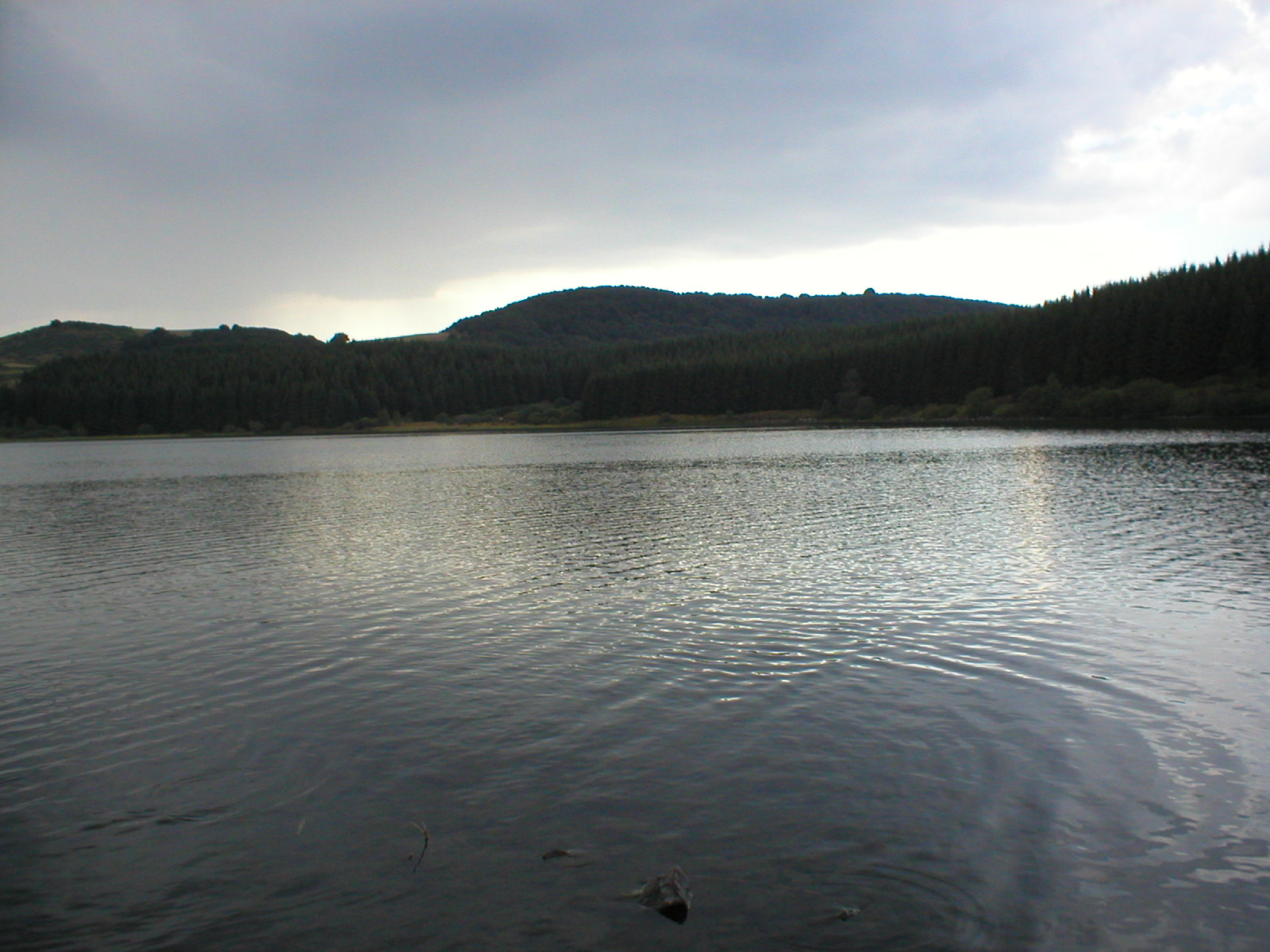

- Location within France
- Location: Compains, Puy-de-Dôme
- Coordinates: 45°28′N 2°54′E
- Basin countries: France
- Surface area: 0.4 km^{2} (0.15 sq mi)
- Max. depth: 18 m (59 ft)
- Surface elevation: 1,182 m (3,878 ft)

Lac de Montcineyre is a lake in Compains, Puy-de-Dôme, France. At an elevation of 1182 m, its surface area is 0.4 km^{2}.
