= Anzat-le-Luguet =

- Commune
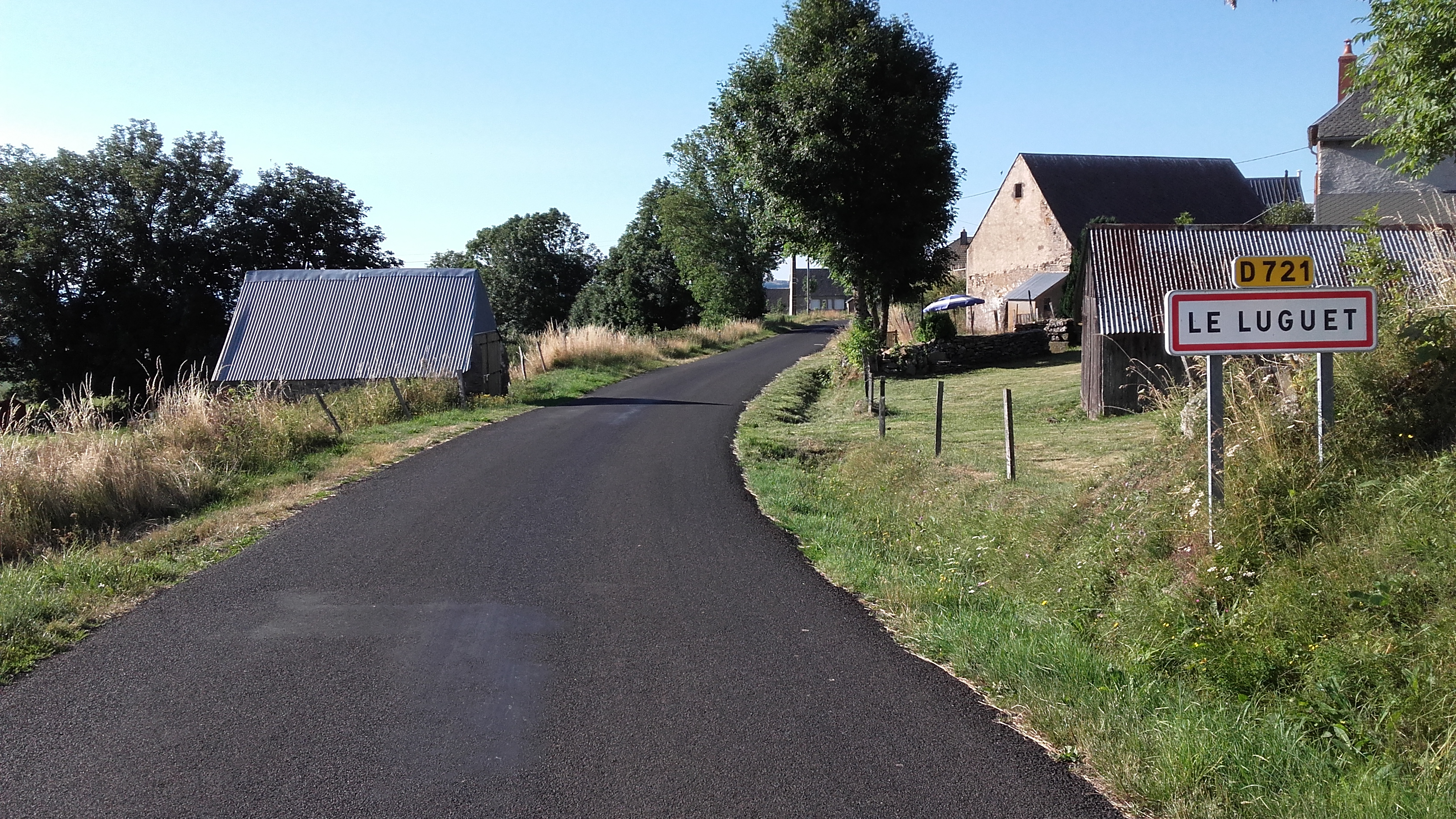
- The road into Le Luguet

- Coat of arms
- Location of Anzat-le-Luguet
- Location within France Location within Auvergne-Rhône-Alpes
- Coordinates: 45°19′59″N 3°02′33″E
- Country: France
- Region: Auvergne-Rhône-Alpes
- Department: Puy-de-Dôme
- Arrondissement: Issoire
- Canton: Brassac-les-Mines
- Intercommunality: Agglo Pays d'Issoire

Government
  - Mayor (2026–32): Emmanuel Correia
- Area^{1}: 66.56 km^{2} (25.70 sq mi)
- Elevation: 1,140 m (3,740 ft)
- Highest elevation: 1,551 m (5,089 ft)
- Lowest elevation: 790 m (2,590 ft)
- Population (2023): 167
  - Density: 2.51/km^{2} (6.50/sq mi)
- Time zone: UTC+01:00 (CET)
  - Summer (DST): UTC+02:00 (CEST)
- INSEE/Postal code: 63006 /63420
- ^{1} French Land Register data, which excludes lakes, ponds, glaciers > 1 km^{2} (0.386 sq mi or 247 acres) and river estuaries.

Anzat-le-Luguet (French pronunciation: [ɑ̃za lə lyɡɛ]; Occitan: Antiac dau Luguet) is a commune in the Puy-de-Dôme department in Auvergne-Rhône-Alpes in central France. It is in the canton of Brassac-les-Mines.

== Geography ==
Anzat-le-Luguet is located in the heart of the volcanic massif of Cézallier, with its highest point situated near the village center: the Signal du Luguet (1,547 m).

== Administration ==
- 2008–2014: Rémi Vigier
- 2014–current: Emmanuel Correia

== Population ==
Historical population
| Year | Pop. | ±% p.a. |
|---|---|---|
| 1968 | 540 | — |
| 1975 | 448 | −2.63% |
| 1982 | 377 | −2.43% |
| 1990 | 295 | −3.02% |
| 1999 | 238 | −2.36% |
| 2007 | 202 | −2.03% |
| 2012 | 185 | −1.74% |
| 2017 | 178 | −0.77% |
| 2023 | 167 | −1.06% |
Source: INSEE

== See also ==
- Communes of the Puy-de-Dôme department
