= Monts Dore =

Remnant peaks of a volcanic massif situated near the center of Massif Central in France

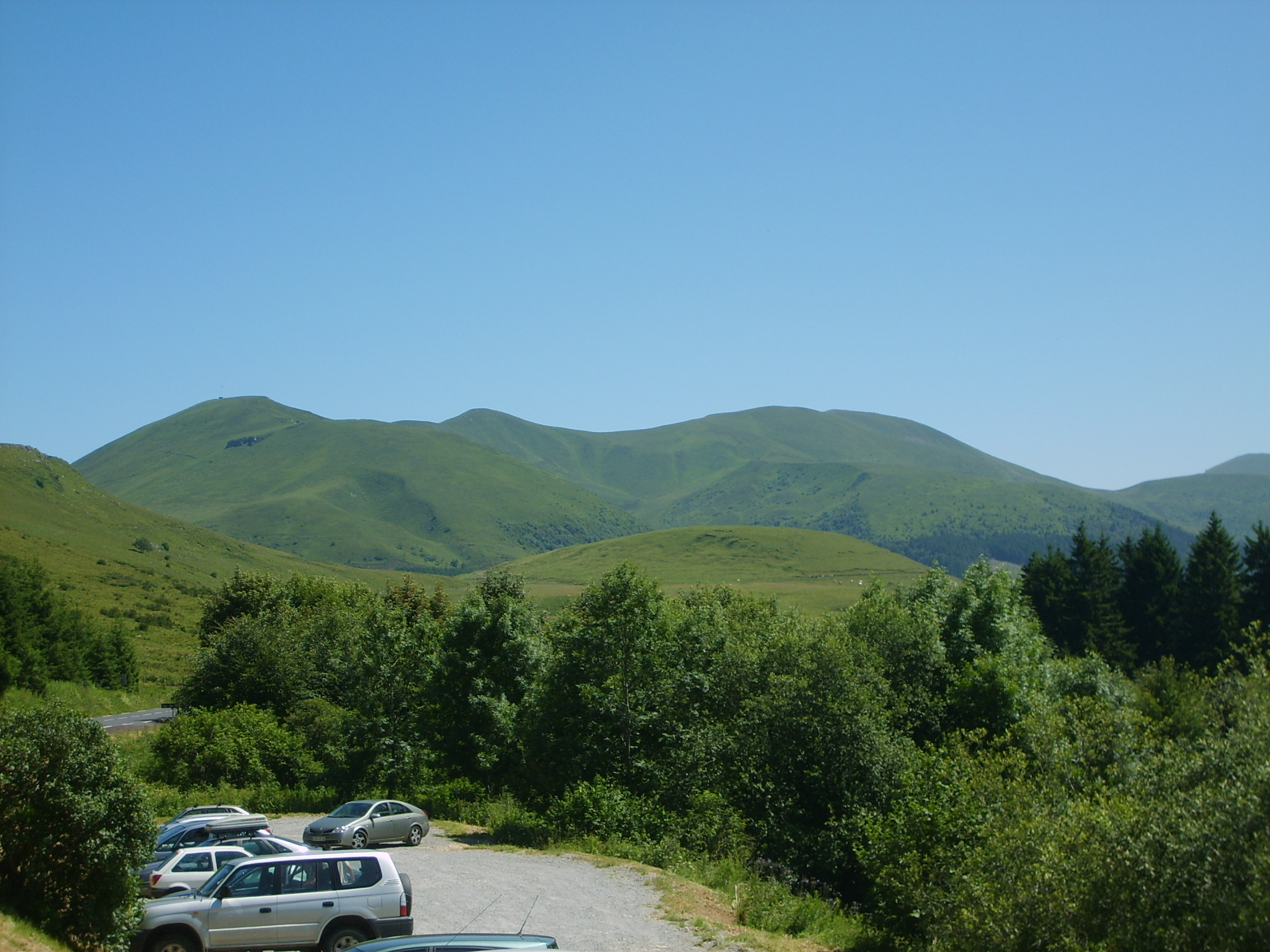
- Peaks in the northern Monts Dore

Highest point
- Elevation: 1,885 m (6,184 ft) at Puy de Sancy
- Coordinates: 45.53°N 2.81°E

Geography
- Location: Auvergne, France
- Parent range: Massif Central

Geology
- Rock age: 200,000 to 3 million years
- Mountain type(s): stratovolcano, lava domes, and maars
- Last eruption: before 200,000 years ago

The Monts Dore (French pronunciation: [mɔ̃ dɔʁ]) are the remnant peaks of a volcanic massif situated near the center of the Massif Central, in the Auvergne region of France. They form a mountainous region, dotted with lakes, thermal springs and romanesque churches. The massif is an integral part of the Parc des Volcans d'Auvergne, and is known for its alpine ski areas and hiking trails.

== Geology ==
The massif is much older than the nearby chaîne des Puys, dating to the end of the Tertiary era. It is a deeply eroded stratovolcano, similar to the Cantal massif to the south, but more reduced in area and volume. Its history began about 3 million years ago with a Plinian eruption that created a large caldera, the contours of which are no longer clearly defined. This eruption resulted in the emission of ignimbrite rhyolitic pumice that covered over 100 km^{2} (39 sq mi) of land. Afterwards, phonolite domes were created on the exterior of the caldera. A period of calm lasting between 1 and 1.5 million years ensued, succeeded by a second major eruptive period that formed the modern Puy de Sancy, the highest peak in the Massif Central, followed by the establishment of smaller domes, dikes, and maars.

The region is dotted with lakes of volcanic origin. Some are maars that have been filled with water, while others are the result of streams whose courses have been blocked by volcanic activity.

== See also ==
- Cézallier Massif – Volcanic plateau from France
