= Signal du Luguet =

Mountain in central France

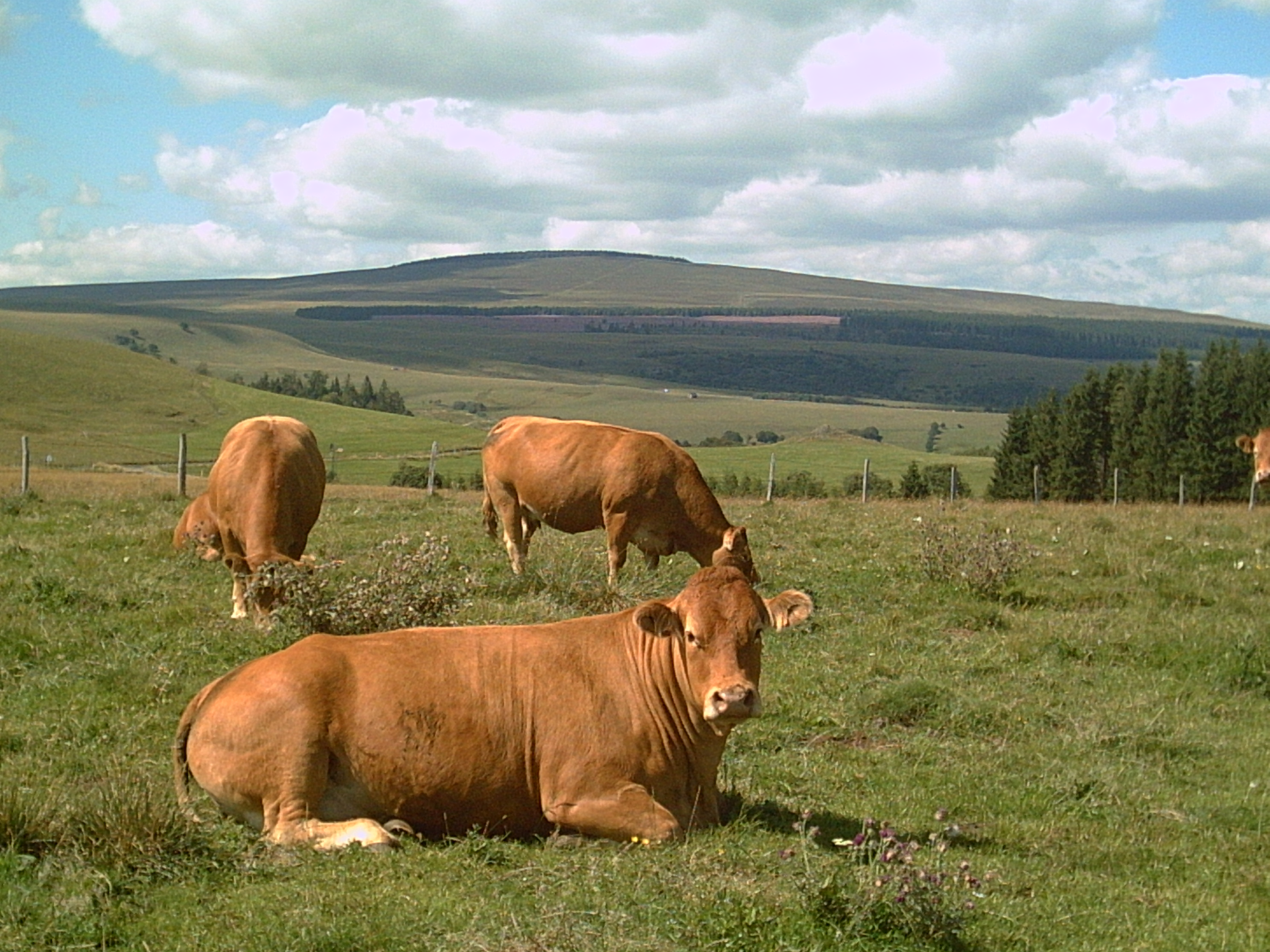
- View of the Signal du Luguet

Highest point
- Elevation: 1,547 m (5,075 ft)
- Coordinates: 45°20′02″N 2°59′13″E

Geography
- Location within France
- Location: Puy-de-Dôme departement, France
- Parent range: Cézallier (Massif Central)

The Signal du Luguet is the highest point in the Cézallier mountains. It is located in the southern part of the Puy-de-Dôme department in the municipality of Anzat-le-Luguet and rises to an altitude of 1,547 meters. It takes its name from Luguet, a village situated on its northeastern slope.

== Geography ==
The Signal du Luguet corresponds to ancient lava lakes formed 5 million years ago. Erosion has erased the reliefs that once overlooked them, leaving the rock in its current elevated position.

Below, to the east, lies the Artout cirque. It is one of the most beautiful glacial valleys in the Massif Central. 20,000 years ago, snow swept by west winds accumulated to the east. It formed a glacier due to the limited exposure to the sun. Moraines can still be found on the slopes.

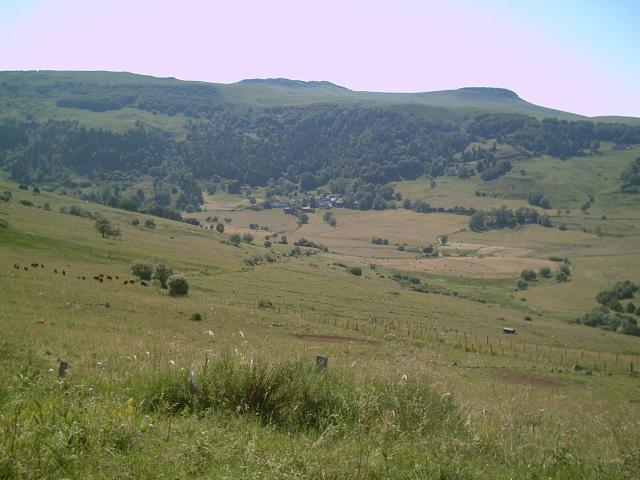
The Artout cirque

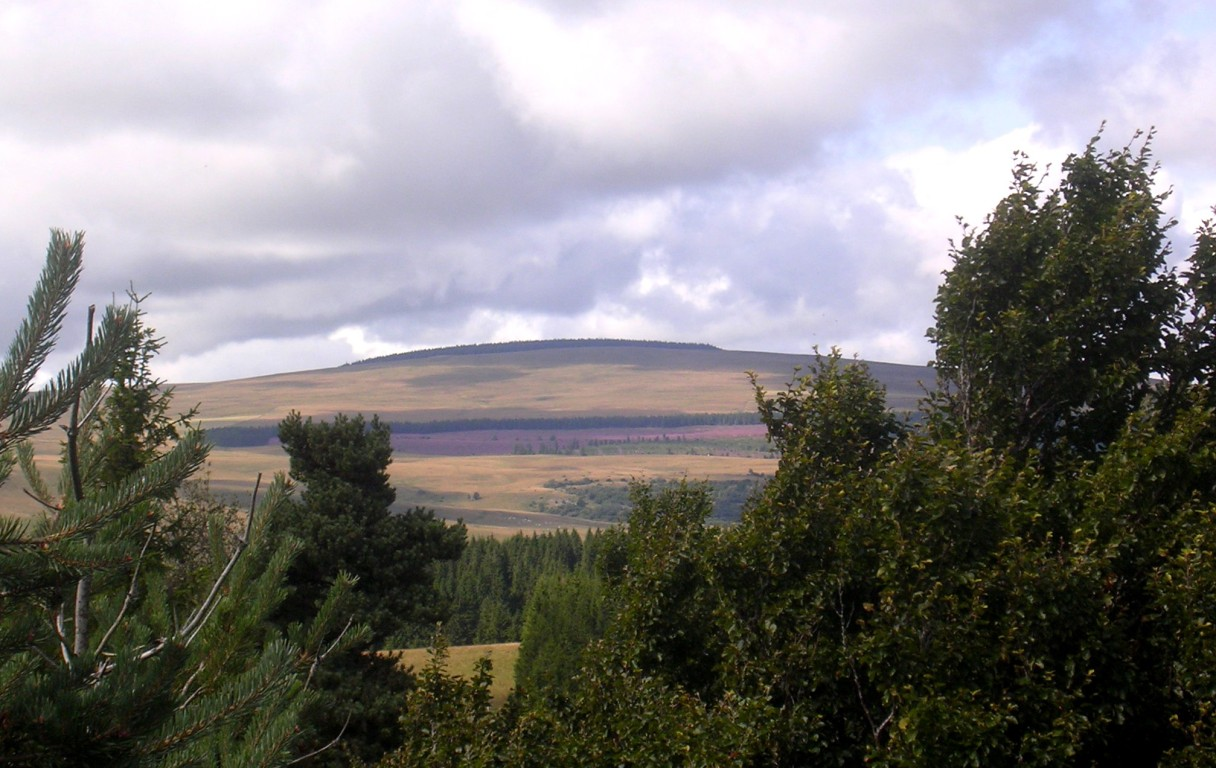
The Signal du Luguet
