= Égliseneuve-d'Entraigues =

- Commune
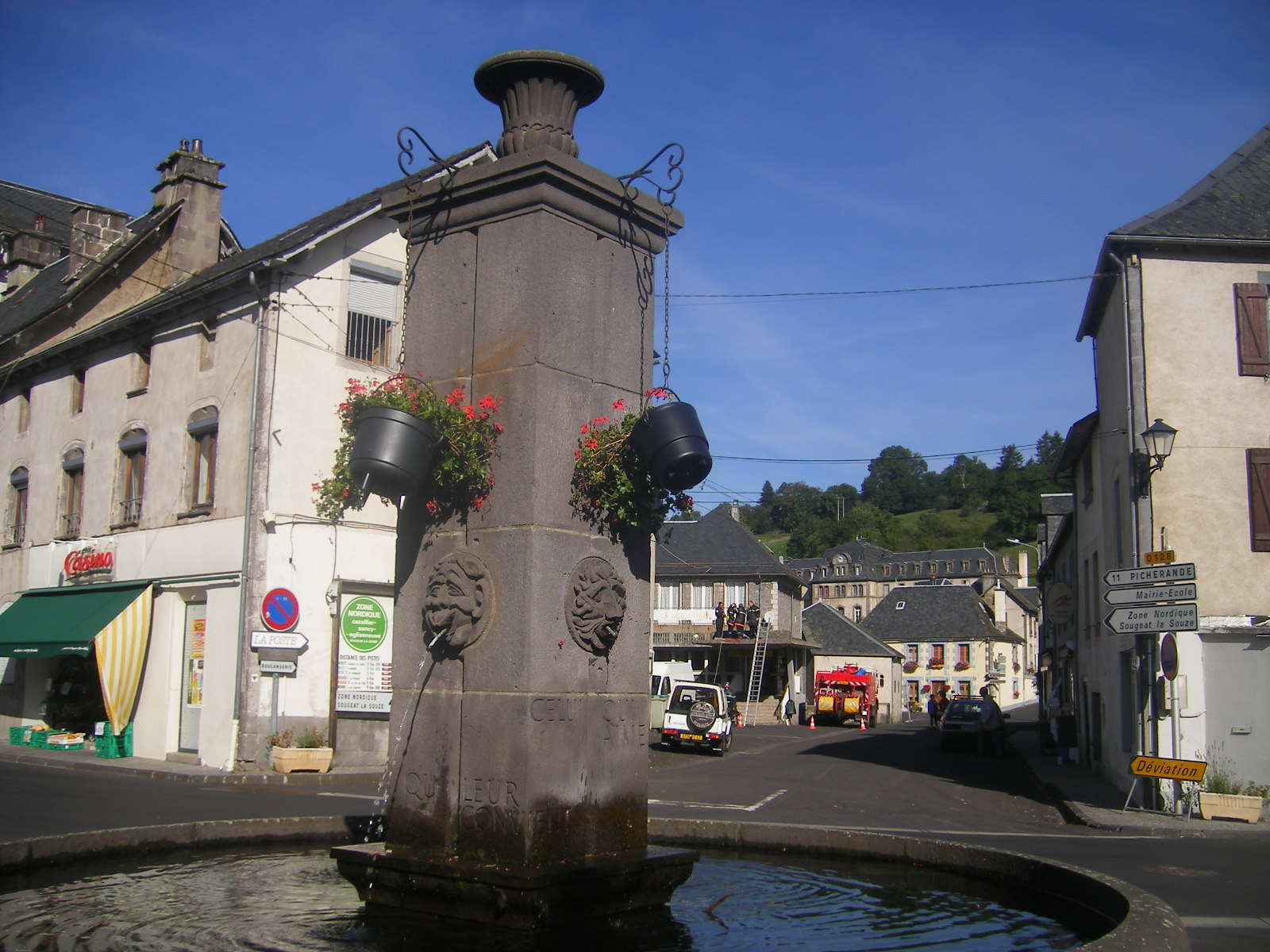
- The town center

- Coat of arms
- Location of Égliseneuve-d'Entraigues
- Location within France Location within Auvergne-Rhône-Alpes
- Coordinates: 45°24′32″N 2°49′41″E
- Country: France
- Region: Auvergne-Rhône-Alpes
- Department: Puy-de-Dôme
- Arrondissement: Issoire
- Canton: Le Sancy
- Intercommunality: Massif du Sancy

Government
  - Mayor (2020–2026): Didier Cardenoux
- Area^{1}: 56.43 km^{2} (21.79 sq mi)
- Elevation: 950 m (3,120 ft)
- Highest elevation: 1,358 m (4,455 ft)
- Lowest elevation: 877 m (2,877 ft)
- Population (2023): 328
  - Density: 5.81/km^{2} (15.1/sq mi)
- Time zone: UTC+01:00 (CET)
  - Summer (DST): UTC+02:00 (CEST)
- INSEE/Postal code: 63144 /63850
- ^{1} French Land Register data, which excludes lakes, ponds, glaciers > 1 km^{2} (0.386 sq mi or 247 acres) and river estuaries.

Égliseneuve-d'Entraigues (French pronunciation: [egliznœv dɑ̃tʁɛg]; Occitan: Gleianèva d'Entraigas) is a commune in the Puy-de-Dôme department in Auvergne in central France.

== Geography ==
The village lies in the southern part of the commune, on the right bank of the Rhue, which flows southward through the commune.

== See also ==
- Communes of the Puy-de-Dôme department
