= Landeyrat =

Commune in Auvergne-Rhône-Alpes, France

- Commune
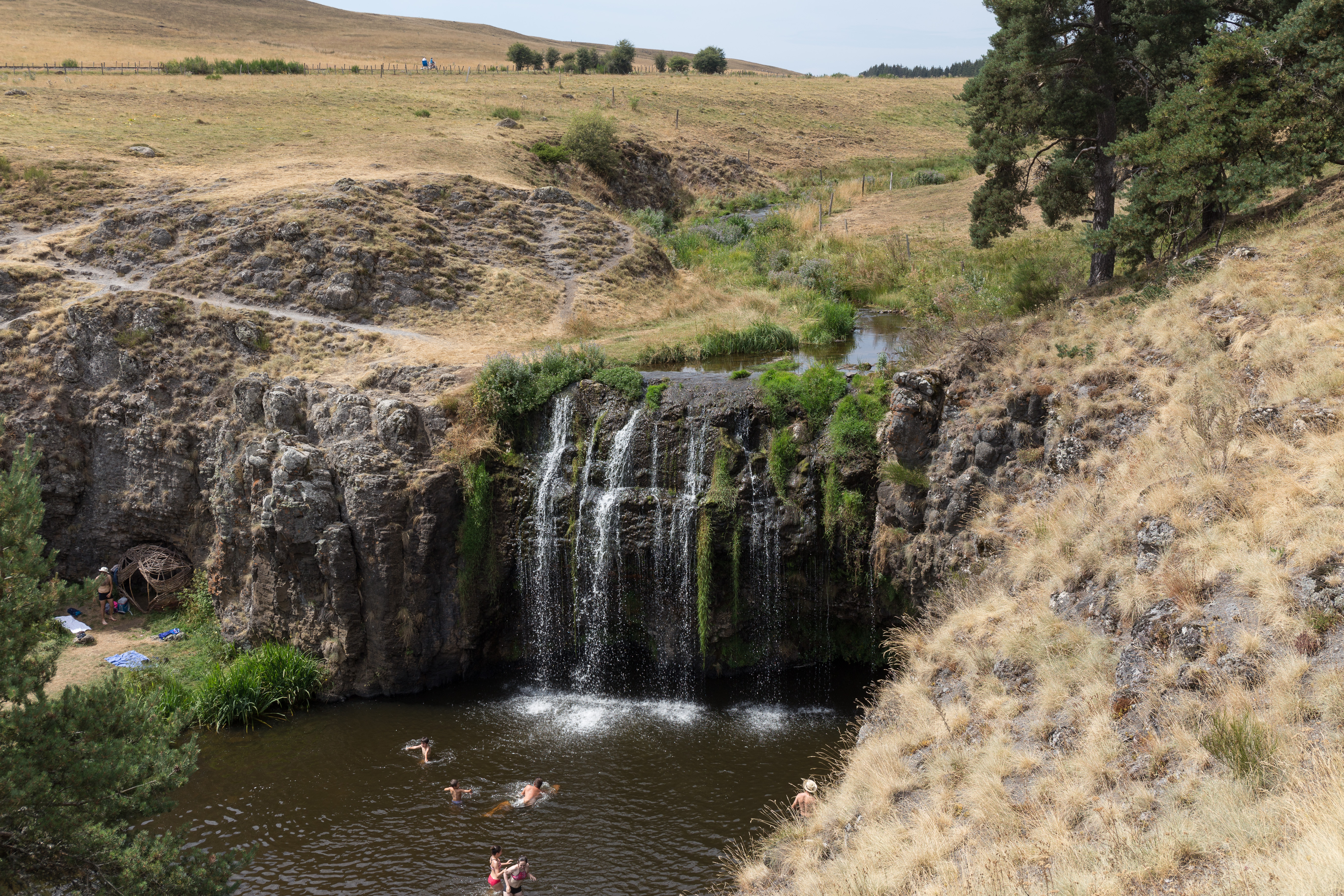
- Veyrines Waterfall, at the border with the commune of Allanche
- Location of Landeyrat
- Location within France Location within Auvergne-Rhône-Alpes
- Coordinates: 45°16′29″N 2°51′54″E
- Country: France
- Region: Auvergne-Rhône-Alpes
- Department: Cantal
- Arrondissement: Saint-Flour
- Canton: Murat

Government
  - Mayor (2020–2026): Jean-Louis Verdier
- Area^{1}: 21.28 km^{2} (8.22 sq mi)
- Elevation: 1,080 m (3,540 ft)
- Highest elevation: 1,327 m (4,354 ft)
- Lowest elevation: 1,038 m (3,406 ft)
- Population (2023): 84
  - Density: 3.9/km^{2} (10/sq mi)
- Time zone: UTC+01:00 (CET)
  - Summer (DST): UTC+02:00 (CEST)
- INSEE/Postal code: 15091 /15160
- ^{1} French Land Register data, which excludes lakes, ponds, glaciers > 1 km^{2} (0.386 sq mi or 247 acres) and river estuaries.

Landeyrat (French pronunciation: [lɑ̃deʁa]; Occitan: Landairac) is a commune in the Cantal department in south-central France.

== Population ==
Historical population
Year	Pop.	±% p.a.
1968	216	—
1975	201	−1.02%
1982	174	−2.04%
1990	130	−3.58%
1999	120	−0.89%
2007	109	−1.19%
2012	101	−1.51%
2017	89	−2.50%
2023	84	−0.96%
Source: INSEE

== See also ==
- Communes of the Cantal department
