= Yellow gentian =

Yellow gentian is a common name for several plants in the genus Gentiana and may refer to:

- Gentiana alba, native to North America
- Gentiana lutea, native to Europe and used in herbal bitters
