= Peyrusse =

Commune in Auvergne-Rhône-Alpes, France

- Commune
- Location of Peyrusse
- Location within France Location within Auvergne-Rhône-Alpes
- Coordinates: 45°12′11″N 3°01′46″E
- Country: France
- Region: Auvergne-Rhône-Alpes
- Department: Cantal
- Arrondissement: Saint-Flour
- Canton: Murat

Government
  - Mayor (2020–2026): André Tronche
- Area^{1}: 29.26 km^{2} (11.30 sq mi)
- Elevation: 950 m (3,120 ft)
- Highest elevation: 1,204 m (3,950 ft)
- Lowest elevation: 629 m (2,064 ft)
- Population (2023): 140
  - Density: 4.8/km^{2} (12/sq mi)
- Time zone: UTC+01:00 (CET)
  - Summer (DST): UTC+02:00 (CEST)
- INSEE/Postal code: 15151 /15170
- ^{1} French Land Register data, which excludes lakes, ponds, glaciers > 1 km^{2} (0.386 sq mi or 247 acres) and river estuaries.

Peyrusse (French pronunciation: [peʁys]; Occitan: Peirussa) is a commune in the Cantal department in south-central France.

== Population ==
Historical population
Year	Pop.	±% p.a.
1968	334	—
1975	276	−2.69%
1982	274	−0.10%
1990	259	−0.70%
1999	215	−2.05%
2007	175	−2.54%
2012	158	−2.02%
2017	153	−0.64%
2023	140	−1.47%
Source: INSEE

== See also ==
- Communes of the Cantal department
