= Vèze, Cantal =

Commune in Auvergne-Rhône-Alpes, France

Vèze
- Commune
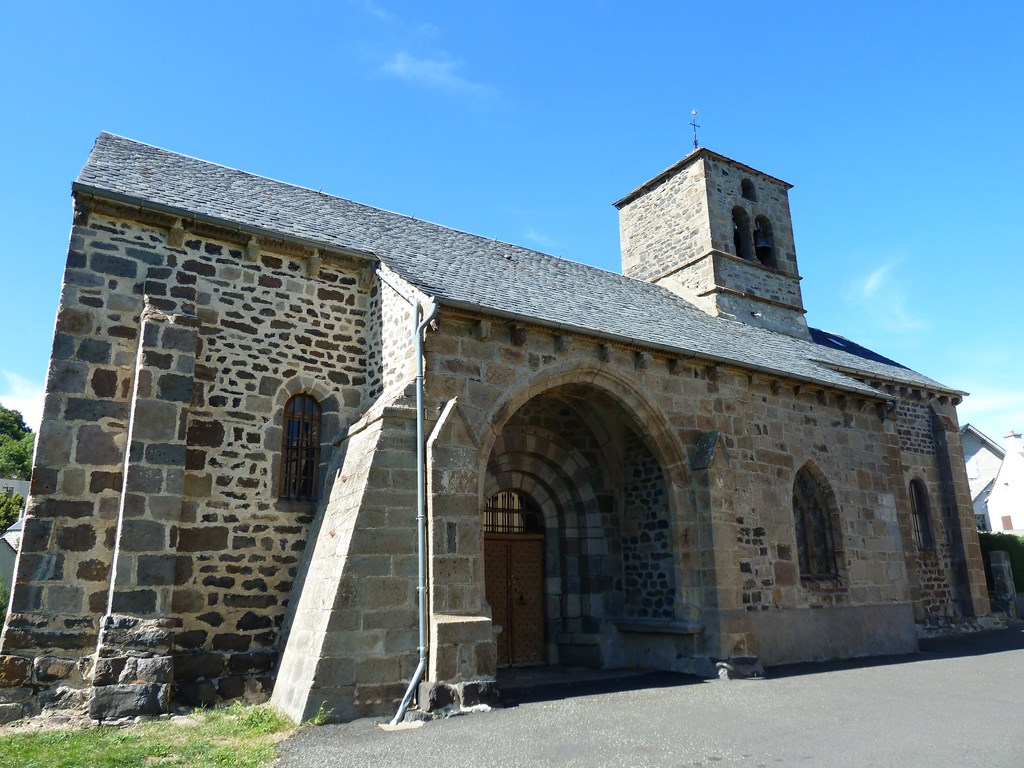
- The church in Vèze
- Location of Vèze
- Location within France Location within Auvergne-Rhône-Alpes
- Coordinates: 45°16′03″N 2°59′40″E
- Country: France
- Region: Auvergne-Rhône-Alpes
- Department: Cantal
- Arrondissement: Saint-Flour
- Canton: Murat
- Intercommunality: Hautes Terres

Government
  - Mayor (2020–2026): Aurélie Bresson
- Area^{1}: 25.46 km^{2} (9.83 sq mi)
- Elevation: 1,100 m (3,600 ft)
- Highest elevation: 1,372 m (4,501 ft)
- Lowest elevation: 871 m (2,858 ft)
- Population (2023): 65
  - Density: 2.6/km^{2} (6.6/sq mi)
- Time zone: UTC+01:00 (CET)
  - Summer (DST): UTC+02:00 (CEST)
- INSEE/Postal code: 15256 /15160
- ^{1} French Land Register data, which excludes lakes, ponds, glaciers > 1 km^{2} (0.386 sq mi or 247 acres) and river estuaries.

Vèze (French pronunciation: [vɛz]; Occitan: Vesa) is a commune in the Cantal department in south-central France.

== Population ==
Historical population
Year	Pop.	±% p.a.
1968	235	—
1975	198	−2.42%
1982	159	−3.09%
1990	139	−1.67%
1999	100	−3.59%
2007	68	−4.71%
2012	66	−0.60%
2017	56	−3.23%
2023	65	+2.52%
Source: INSEE

== See also ==
- Communes of the Cantal department
