= Compains =

- Commune
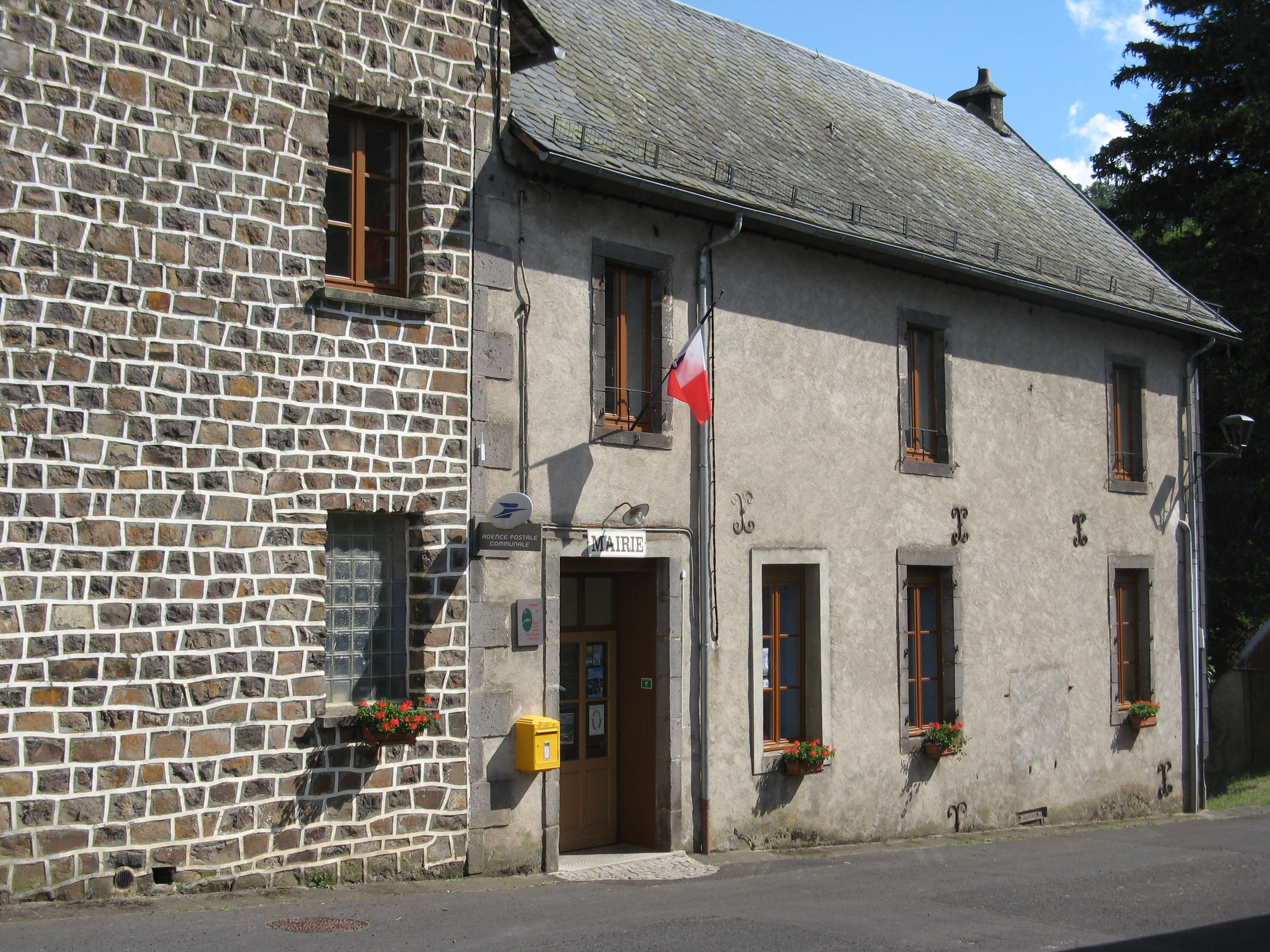
- The town hall in Compains
- Location of Compains
- Location within France Location within Auvergne-Rhône-Alpes
- Coordinates: 45°26′32″N 2°55′43″E
- Country: France
- Region: Auvergne-Rhône-Alpes
- Department: Puy-de-Dôme
- Arrondissement: Issoire
- Canton: Le Sancy
- Intercommunality: Massif du Sancy

Government
  - Mayor (2020–2026): Henri Valette
- Area^{1}: 50.16 km^{2} (19.37 sq mi)
- Highest elevation: 1,358 m (4,455 ft)
- Lowest elevation: 840 m (2,760 ft)
- Population (2023): 125
  - Density: 2.49/km^{2} (6.45/sq mi)
- Time zone: UTC+01:00 (CET)
  - Summer (DST): UTC+02:00 (CEST)
- INSEE/Postal code: 63117 /63610
- ^{1} French Land Register data, which excludes lakes, ponds, glaciers > 1 km^{2} (0.386 sq mi or 247 acres) and river estuaries.

Compains (French pronunciation: [kɔ̃pɛ̃]) is a commune in the Puy-de-Dôme department in Auvergne-Rhône-Alpes in central France.

== See also ==
- Communes of the Puy-de-Dôme department
