= Ally, Cantal =

Commune in Auvergne-Rhône-Alpes, France

Ally
- Commune
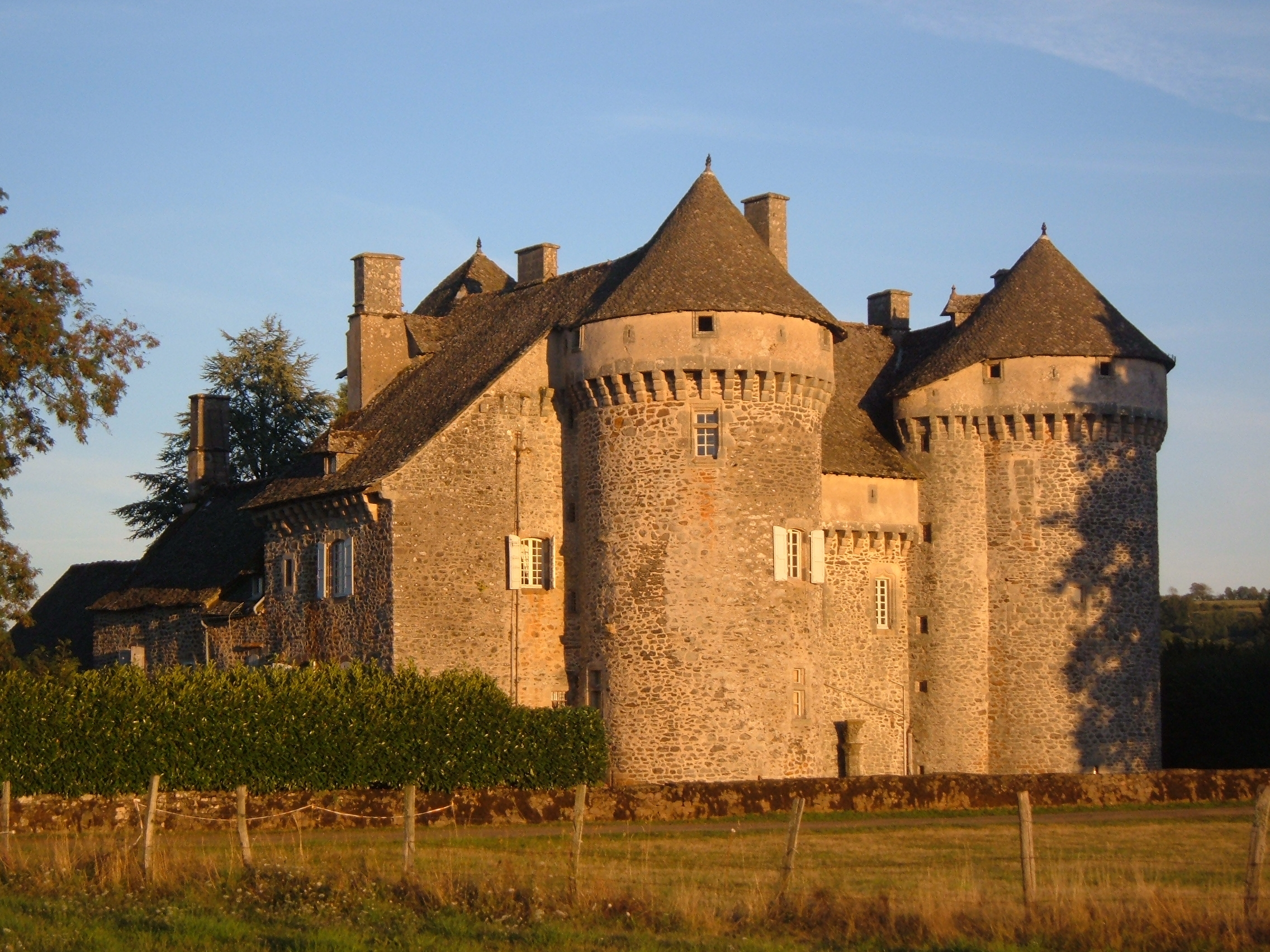
- Château of La Vigne
- Location of Ally
- Location within France Location within Auvergne-Rhône-Alpes
- Coordinates: 45°10′30″N 2°18′57″E
- Country: France
- Region: Auvergne-Rhône-Alpes
- Department: Cantal
- Arrondissement: Mauriac
- Canton: Mauriac
- Intercommunality: Pays de Salers

Government
  - Mayor (2020–2026): Pascal Terrail
- Area^{1}: 23.11 km^{2} (8.92 sq mi)
- Elevation: 720 m (2,360 ft)
- Highest elevation: 810 m (2,660 ft)
- Lowest elevation: 471 m (1,545 ft)
- Population (2023): 594
  - Density: 25.7/km^{2} (66.6/sq mi)
- Time zone: UTC+01:00 (CET)
  - Summer (DST): UTC+02:00 (CEST)
- INSEE/Postal code: 15003 /15700
- ^{1} French Land Register data, which excludes lakes, ponds, glaciers > 1 km^{2} (0.386 sq mi or 247 acres) and river estuaries.

Ally (French pronunciation: [ali]; Occitan: Ali) is a commune in the Cantal department in the Auvergne region of south-central France.

== Geography ==
Ally is located some 60 km south-west of Clermont-Ferrand and some 65 km south-east of Limoges in a straight line. It is at least 30 km from the nearest national highway and access is by district roads the most direct being the D680 which runs north-east from Pleaux and enters the western border of the commune. It goes directly to the town then turns to exit the commune south-east to join with the road D922. The D681 also comes south from Mauriac to the village and the D29 comes from Drugeac in the west by a circuitous route to the village. The commune is mostly farmland although with some mountain slopes and forests in the north.

The river Auze flows north forming the eastern and then the northern border of the commune before flowing into the Dordogne south-west of Chalvignac. A number of streams feed this river from the commune including the Ruisseau de Peschaytou, Ruisseau de Terrieu, and Le Sione which forms part of the south-eastern border.

There are quite a number of hamlets and villages in the commune. These are:

- Champell
- Chavergne
- Crucholles
- Drignac
- Fraissy
- Ginalhac
- Labro
- Langlade
- Le Breuil
- Les Martres
- Le Peuch
- Le Pouget
- Le Puy Soutro
- Maissac
- Monteil
- Nebouillieres
- Pommier
- Tarneu
- Veze

== Administration ==
List of Successive Mayors of Ally

From	To	Name	Party	Position
2001	2017	Jean-Yves Bony	RPR then UMP then LR	MP for Cantal's 2nd constituency General Counsel
2017	2026	Pascal Terrail		

== Population ==
The inhabitants of the commune are known as Allyçois or Allyçoises in French.

Historical population
Year	Pop.	±% p.a.
1968	997	—
1975	916	−1.20%
1982	781	−2.25%
1990	698	−1.39%
1999	700	+0.03%
2007	667	−0.60%
2012	643	−0.73%
2017	605	−1.21%
2023	594	−0.31%
Source: INSEE

== Culture and heritage ==
=== Civil heritage ===
The commune has a number of buildings and structures that are registered as historical monuments:

- The Chateau de la Vigne (15th century). The Chateau contains two items that are registered as historical objects:
  - A Mural: Diane bathing (17th century)
  - A Mural: Atalante and Méléagre (17th century)
- The Chateau de la Vigne Park
- The Maison Blanche Windmill (1882)
- The Pargeat Windmill (1817)

=== Religious heritage ===
The commune has several religious buildings and structures that are registered as historical monuments:

- The Church of Saint-Ferréol (12th century) was attended by Jean-Jacques Rousseau. The church contains a Container for relics: the Martyr Saint Vincent
- The Church of Saint-Thibaud (11th century)

== Notable People linked to the commune ==
- Jean-Jacques Rousseau

== See also ==
- Communes of the Cantal department
