= Saline =

Saline may refer to:

== Salt-related ==
- Saline (medicine), a liquid with salt content to match the human body
- Saline water, non-medicinal salt water
- Saline, a historical term (especially American) for a salt works or saltern

== Places ==
=== United States ===
- Saline City, former name of ghost town Drawbridge, California
- Saline, Louisiana, a village
- Saline, Michigan, a city
- La Saline, Missouri, an abandoned village
- Saline, Texas, an unincorporated community
- Saline Bayou, Winn Parish, Louisiana
- Saline Branch, a tributary of the Vermilion River in Illinois
- Saline City, Indiana
- Saline City, Missouri
- Saline County (disambiguation), several counties
- Saline Creek (disambiguation), several streams in Missouri
- Saline Island (Kentucky), on the National Register of Historic Places
- Saline Range, a mountain range in California
- Saline River (disambiguation), several rivers, all but one in the United States
- Saline Township (disambiguation), several townships
- Saline Valley, a valley in California

=== Elsewhere ===
- Saline, Calvados, a former commune in Normandy, France
- Saline, Fife, Scotland, a village and parish
- Saline Lake, in La Saline Natural Area, Alberta, Canada
- Saline (Italian river)
- Saline Island, an islet in Grenada

== People ==
- Carol Saline (1939–2025), American author and journalist
- Ludovic Saline (born 1989), French footballer

== Other uses ==
- Saline High School (disambiguation)
- Saline Cemetery, Drew County, Arkansas, United States, on the National Register of Historic Places
- Saline station, a former railroad depot in Saline, Michigan, on the National Register of Historic Places
- Saline County Airport, Arkansas, a former public-use airport
- Saline County Regional Airport, Arkansas, the replacement of the above

== See also ==
- Battle of the Saline River, an 1867 battle of the American Indian Wars
- Grande Saline (disambiguation)
- Salines (disambiguation)
- Salinity
- Salin (disambiguation)
- Salina (disambiguation)
