= Anglards-de-Salers =

Commune in Auvergne-Rhône-Alpes, France

- Commune
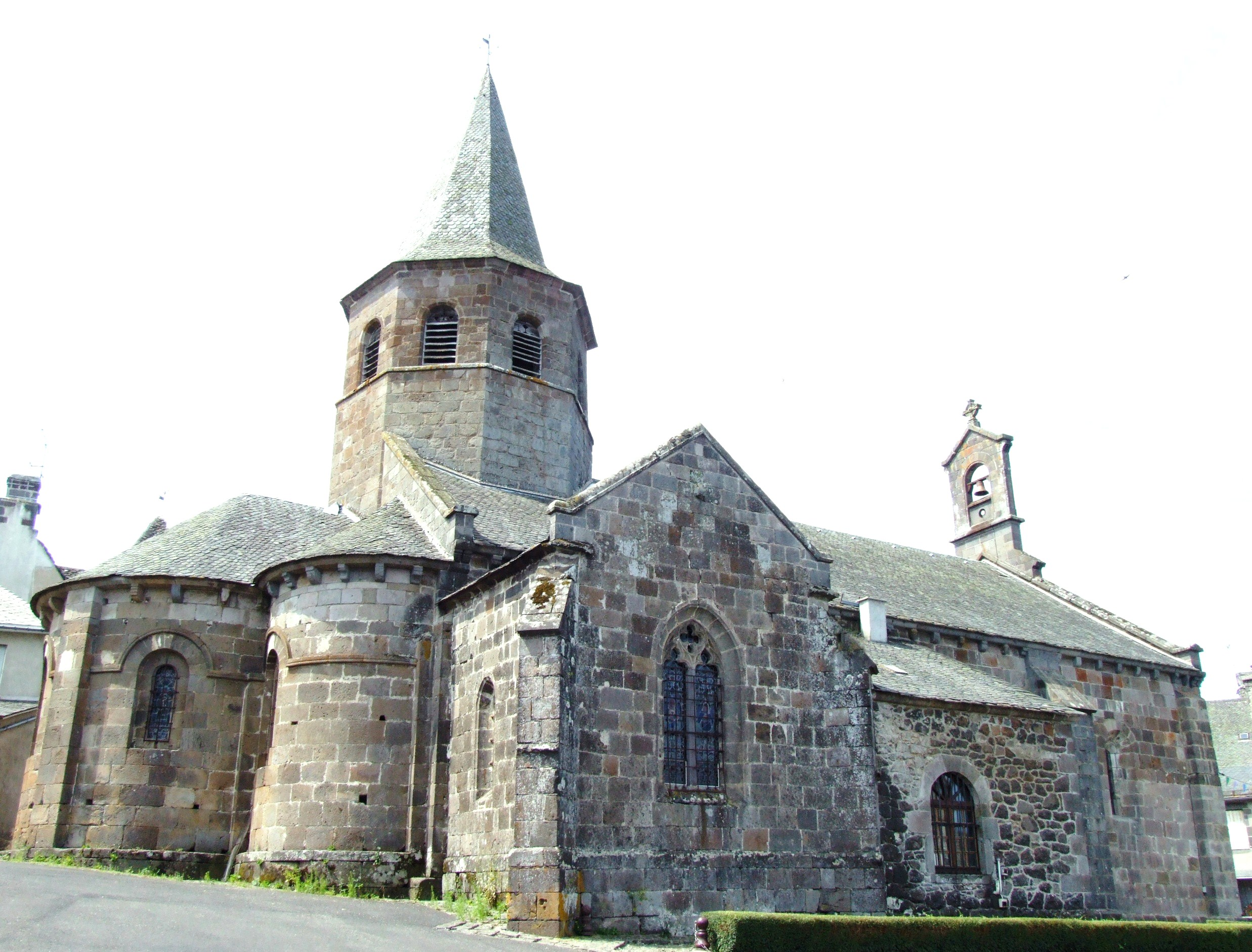
- The church of Saint-Thyrse, in Anglards-de-Salers

- Flag Coat of arms
- Location of Anglards-de-Salers
- Location within France Location within Auvergne-Rhône-Alpes
- Coordinates: 45°12′20″N 2°26′27″E
- Country: France
- Region: Auvergne-Rhône-Alpes
- Department: Cantal
- Arrondissement: Mauriac
- Canton: Mauriac
- Intercommunality: Pays de Salers

Government
  - Mayor (2020–2026): François Descoeur
- Area^{1}: 48.36 km^{2} (18.67 sq mi)
- Elevation: 825 m (2,707 ft)
- Highest elevation: 1,317 m (4,321 ft)
- Lowest elevation: 530 m (1,740 ft)
- Population (2023): 727
  - Density: 15.0/km^{2} (38.9/sq mi)
- Time zone: UTC+01:00 (CET)
  - Summer (DST): UTC+02:00 (CEST)
- INSEE/Postal code: 15006 /15380
- ^{1} French Land Register data, which excludes lakes, ponds, glaciers > 1 km^{2} (0.386 sq mi or 247 acres) and river estuaries.

Anglards-de-Salers (French pronunciation: [ɑ̃ɡlaʁ də salɛʁ]; Occitan: Anglars de Salèrn) is a commune in the Cantal department in the Auvergne region of south-central France.

== Geography ==
Anglards-de-Salers is located some 60 km west by north-west of Saint-Flour and 15 km south of Ydes. It can be accessed by the D122 road from Mauriac in the west to the village. There is also the minor D22 road from Méallet in the north to the village which continues as a more major road to Salers in the south-east. The D222 road also comes to the village from Salins in the west. The D12 road from Veyrieres in the north also passes inside the north-eastern border of the commune and continues to Le Falgoux to the south-east of the commune. The D212 roads goes west from the D12 to the village. There are a number of small hamlets in the commune. These are:

- Les Aldieres
- Bagnac
- Baliergues
- La Bastide
- Bouisse
- Le Breuil
- Le Caire
- Le Chambon
- Chapsieres
- Epinasolles
- Fignac
- Fournols
- Haut Bagnac
- Joncoux
- Longvergne
- Maleprade
- Montclard
- Noux
- Nuzerolles
- Le Peil
- Pepanie
- Pons
- Pradelles
- Sarrette
- Le Viaureau
- Voleyrac

Other than a belt of forest along the north of the commune, the commune is entirely farmland.

The Mars stream flows through the north of the commune from the east joined by the Ruisseau de Veysset in the north of the commune then continuing north to join the Sumene at Vendes. There is also the Auze stream flowing through the heart of the commune towards the west where it joins the Sione east of Escorailles. The Monzola also flows west in the south joining the Auze just west of the commune. Several other unnamed streams flow into these streams.

== History ==
=== List of Priests for Anglards-de-Salers ===
List of Priests

From	To	Name	Title
1508		Jean de Chazettes	Curato Eclesiae parrochialis anglaris
1919	1929	A. Borne	Priest
1936	1941	Paul Besse	Priest

=== Heraldry ===
Arms of Anglards-de-Salers	The official status of the blazon is to be determined Blazon: Party per pale, first Azure in chief Or, second Azure a fish Argent posed in bend accompanied by 5 mullets the same 3 in chief set 2 and 1 and 2 in base posed in bend.

== Administration ==
List of Successive Mayors

From	To	Name	Party	Position
1792	1800	Antoine Faucher		Notary
1800	1803	Jean Pebrel		
1803	1808	Antoine Bergeron		
1808	1825	Jean Antoine Sauvage		
1825	1830	Jean Rolland		
1848	1860	Jean-Martin Salsac		
1904	1908	Justin Mourguy		
1908	1919	Paul Bergeron		Doctor
1920	1935	Antoine Serre		
1935	1947	Joseph Mathieu		Doctor
1947	1965	Augustin Chauvet	UDSR	
1965	1995	Jean Descoeur		Doctor
1995	2026	François Descoeur	DVD	Architect

== Population ==
The inhabitants of the commune are known as Anglardois or Anglardoises in French.

Historical population
Year	Pop.	±% p.a.
1968	1,240	—
1975	1,037	−2.52%
1982	819	−3.32%
1990	843	+0.36%
1999	755	−1.22%
2007	767	+0.20%
2012	809	+1.07%
2017	777	−0.80%
2023	727	−1.10%
Source: INSEE

== Culture and heritage ==
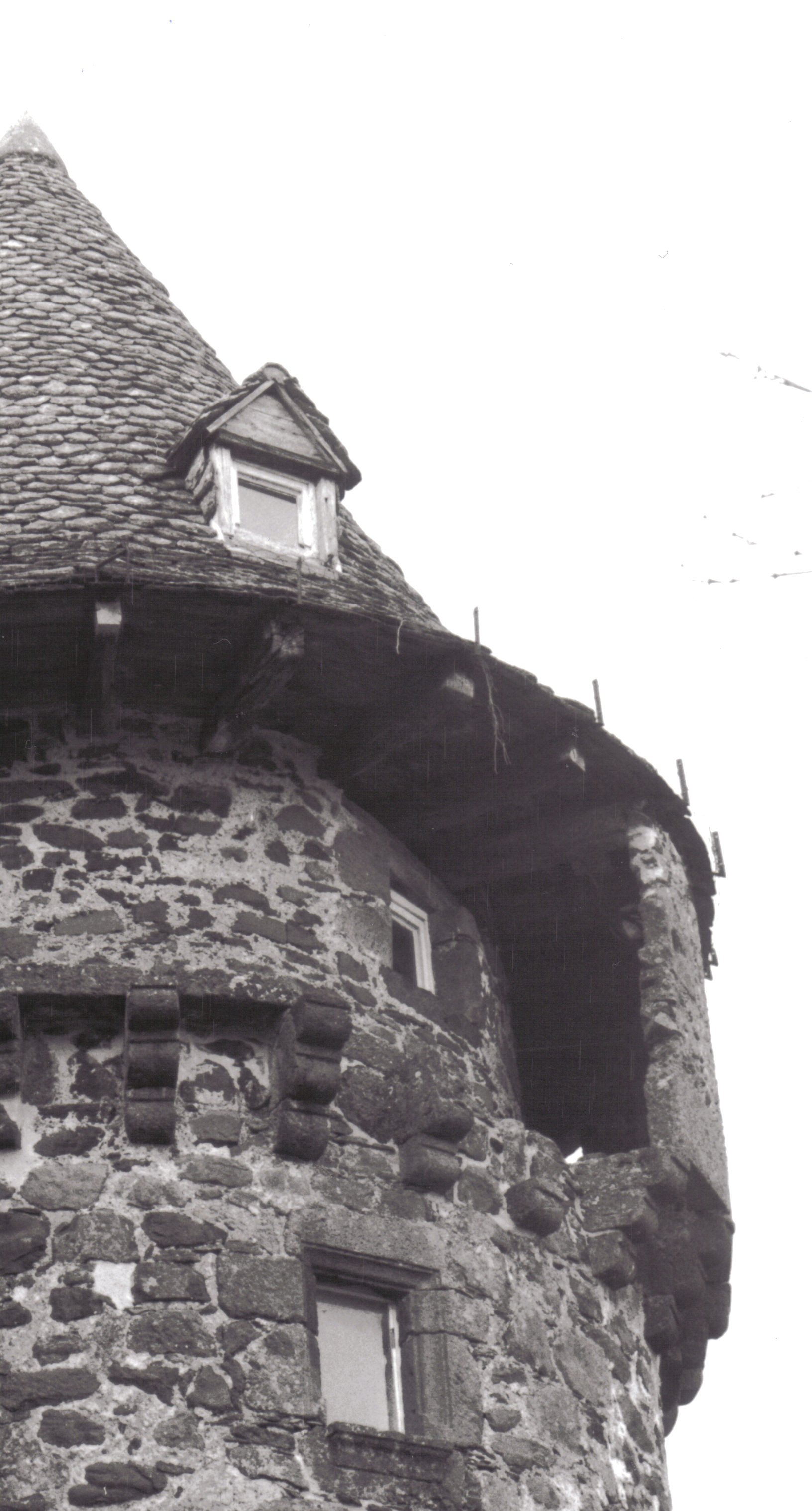
The Chateau de la Trémollière: detail of the keep

=== Civil heritage ===
The commune has a number of buildings and structures that are registered as historical monuments:

- The Espradel Garden (19th century)
- The Chateau de Longevergne (1905)
- The Château de la Trémolière (15th century) The chateau houses a collection of Aubusson tapestries from the 16th century called the "bestiaire fantastique" (fantastic bestiary). The Chateau contains two items that are registered as historical objects:
  - 4 sets of Wood Panelling
  - 11 Tapestries (16th century)
- The Montbrun Garden

Other sites of interest

- The Deduit Orchard is a creation by landscapers Ossart and Maurières: a contemporary medieval garden inspired by the Roman de la rose and the bestiaire fantastique collection.
- Walking trails in the mountain pastures with a plan table
- Robert Besogne Stadium is a football stadium hosting the EAS (Entente Anglards Salers)

=== Religious heritage ===
- The Church of Saint-Thyrse (12th century) is registered as an historical monument. The Church contains two items that are registered as historical objects:
  - The face of the Altar: Descent from the Cross (16th century)
  - A Group Sculpture: Virgin of Pity (17th century)

== Notable people linked to the commune ==
- Paul Malassagne, Senator for Cantal, was born at Nuzerolles

== See also ==
- Communes of the Cantal department
