= Jean-Yves Bony =

French politician

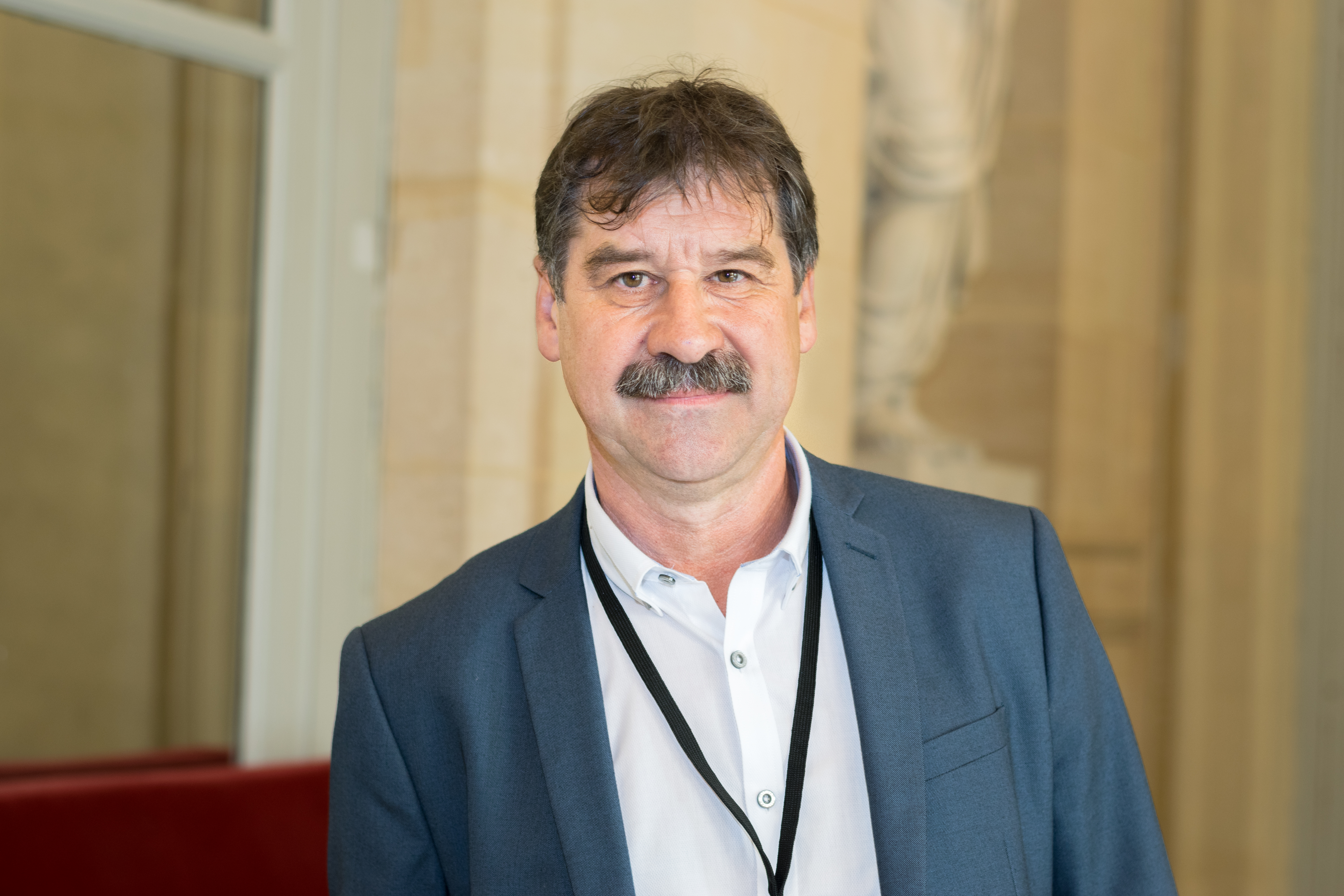
- Jean-Yves Bony in 2017

Member of the National Assembly for Cantal's 2nd constiuentcy
- Incumbent
- Assumed office 21 June 2017
- Preceded by: Alain Marleix

Personal details
- Born: 11 March 1955 (age 70); Aurillac, France
- Political party: The Republicans
- Profession: Farmer

Jean-Yves Bony (born 11 March 1955 in Aurillac) is a French farmer and politician of the Republicans.

== Political career ==
Bony has been mayor of the commune of Ally in the Cantal department since March 2001 and vice-president of the Communauté de communes du Pays de Salers, created in 2004. He is also president of the Ally/Escorailles/Brageac Syndicat des Eaux (water company) and president of the retirement home of Ally.

A general councillor in Cantal, representing the Canton de Pleaux, he was the eighth vice-president of the Cantal General Council.

A substitute of Alain Marleix at the general election in June 2007, Bony became deputy of the 2nd circonscription of Cantal when the latter became Secretary of State for Veterans on 19 June 2007 in the second government of François Fillon. Marleix was re-elected in 2012.

In parliament, Bony serves on the Committee on Sustainable Development and Spatial Planning. In addition to his committee assignments, he is part of the French-Cuban Parliamentary Friendship Group.

== Political positions ==
In the Republicans’ 2017 leadership election, Bony endorsed Laurent Wauquiez. Ahead of the 2022 presidential elections, he publicly declared his support for Michel Barnier as the Republicans’ candidate. In the run-up to the Republicans’ 2022 convention, he endorsed Éric Ciotti as the party's chairman.
