= Salins =

Salins may refer to:

== Places ==
- Salins, Cantal, commune in the Cantal department, France
- Salins, Seine-et-Marne, commune in the Seine-et-Marne department, France
- Salins, Switzerland, former municipality in the canton of Valais, Switzerland
- Salins-les-Bains, commune in the Jura department, France
- Salins-les-Thermes, former commune in the Savoie department, France
- Château-Salins, commune in the Moselle department, France

== People ==
- Salins (surname)

== See also ==
- Salin (disambiguation)
- Sallins, Ireland, a town in County Kildare
