= Solinus (disambiguation) =

Solinus may refer to:

- Gaius Julius Solinus, a 3rd century Latin author
- Solinus (horse), a British racehorse (1975–1979)
- Solinus, Duke of Ephesus, a character in William Shakespeare's play The Comedy of Errors

== See also ==
- Salinas (disambiguation)
