= Saint-Vincent-de-Salers =

Commune in Auvergne-Rhône-Alpes, France

- Commune
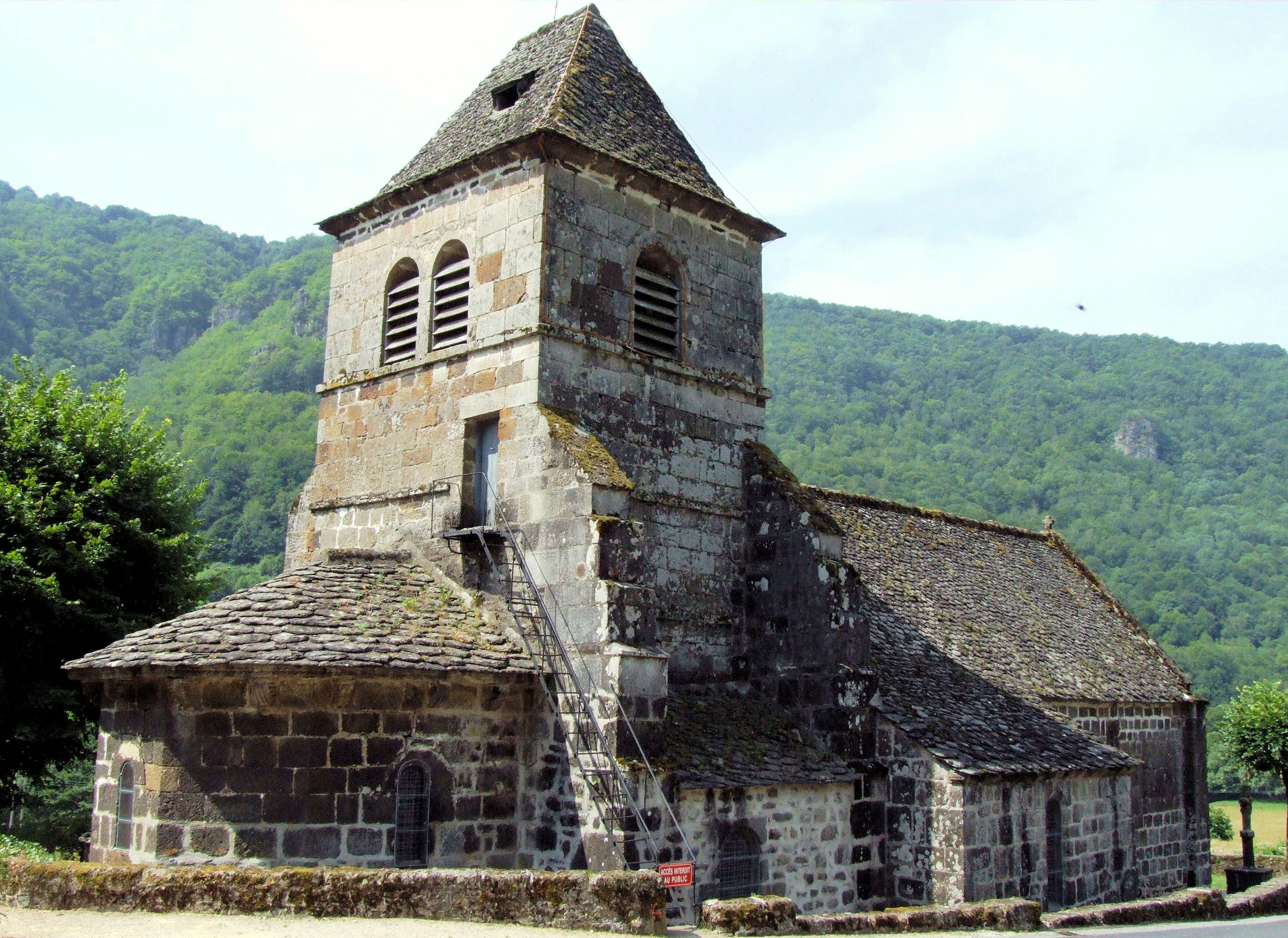
- The church of Saint-Vincent, in Saint-Vincent-de-Salers
- Location of Saint-Vincent-de-Salers
- Location within France Location within Auvergne-Rhône-Alpes
- Coordinates: 45°12′14″N 2°31′57″E
- Country: France
- Region: Auvergne-Rhône-Alpes
- Department: Cantal
- Arrondissement: Mauriac
- Canton: Riom-ès-Montagnes

Government
  - Mayor (2020–2026): Gérard Chancel
- Area^{1}: 18.87 km^{2} (7.29 sq mi)
- Elevation: 740 m (2,430 ft)
- Highest elevation: 1,264 m (4,147 ft)
- Lowest elevation: 575 m (1,886 ft)
- Population (2023): 70
  - Density: 3.7/km^{2} (9.6/sq mi)
- Time zone: UTC+01:00 (CET)
  - Summer (DST): UTC+02:00 (CEST)
- INSEE/Postal code: 15218 /15380
- ^{1} French Land Register data, which excludes lakes, ponds, glaciers > 1 km^{2} (0.386 sq mi or 247 acres) and river estuaries.

Saint-Vincent-de-Salers (French pronunciation: [sɛ̃ vɛ̃sɑ̃ də salɛʁ], literally Saint-Vincent of Salers; Occitan: Sant Vincenç de Salèrn, before 1994: Saint-Vincent) is a commune in the Cantal department in south-central France.

== Population ==
Historical population
Year	Pop.	±% p.a.
1968	299	—
1975	217	−4.48%
1982	168	−3.59%
1990	127	−3.44%
1999	108	−1.78%
2007	84	−3.09%
2012	72	−3.04%
2017	66	−1.73%
2023	70	+0.99%
Source: INSEE

== See also ==
- Communes of the Cantal department
