= Arrondissement of Mauriac =

Coordinates: 45°12′N 2°20′E

Mauriac
- Arrondissement
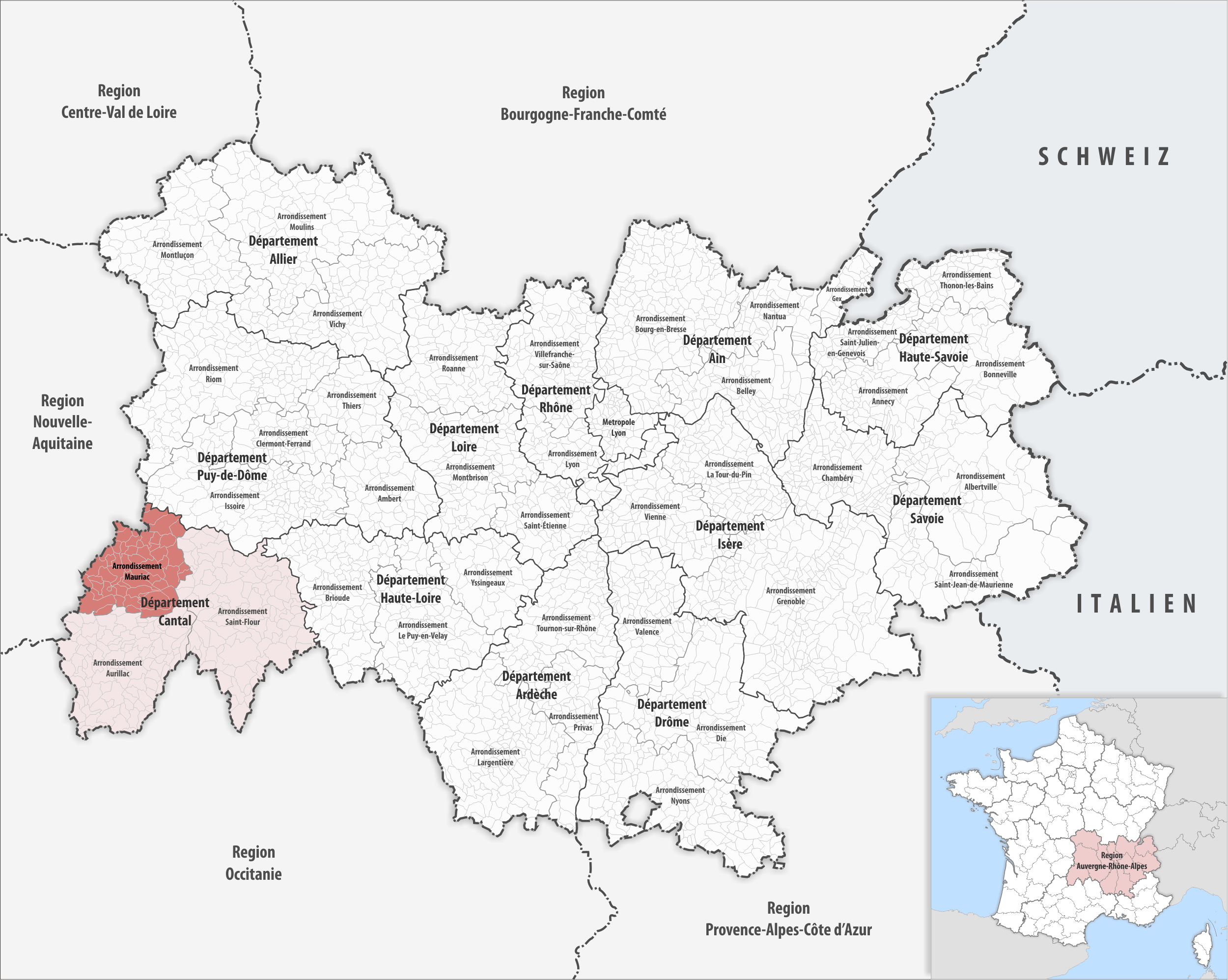
- Location within the region Auvergne-Rhône-Alpes
- Country: France
- Region: Auvergne-Rhône-Alpes
- Department: Cantal
- No. of communes: {{{nbcomm}}}
- Area: 1,278.5 km^{2} (493.6 sq mi)
- Population (2023): 24,881
  - Density: 19.461/km^{2} (50.404/sq mi)
- INSEE code: 152

The arrondissement of Mauriac is an arrondissement of France in the Cantal department of the Auvergne-Rhône-Alpes region. It has 55 communes. Its population is 25,085 (2021), and its area is 1,278.5 km^{2} (493.6 sq mi).

== Composition ==
The communes of the arrondissement of Mauriac, and their INSEE codes, are:

1. Ally (15003)
2. Anglards-de-Salers (15006)
3. Antignac (15008)
4. Apchon (15009)
5. Arches (15010)
6. Auzers (15015)
7. Barriac-les-Bosquets (15018)
8. Bassignac (15019)
9. Beaulieu (15020)
10. Brageac (15024)
11. Chalvignac (15036)
12. Champagnac (15037)
13. Champs-sur-Tarentaine-Marchal (15038)
14. Chaussenac (15046)
15. Collandres (15052)
16. Drugeac (15063)
17. Escorailles (15064)
18. Le Falgoux (15066)
19. Le Fau (15067)
20. Fontanges (15070)
21. Jaleyrac (15079)
22. Lanobre (15092)
23. Madic (15111)
24. Mauriac (15120)
25. Méallet (15123)
26. Menet (15124)
27. La Monselie (15128)
28. Le Monteil (15131)
29. Moussages (15137)
30. Pleaux (15153)
31. Riom-ès-Montagnes (15162)
32. Saignes (15169)
33. Saint-Bonnet-de-Salers (15174)
34. Saint-Chamant (15176)
35. Sainte-Eulalie (15186)
36. Saint-Étienne-de-Chomeil (15185)
37. Saint-Hippolyte (15190)
38. Saint-Martin-Cantalès (15200)
39. Saint-Martin-Valmeroux (15202)
40. Saint-Paul-de-Salers (15205)
41. Saint-Pierre (15206)
42. Saint-Projet-de-Salers (15208)
43. Saint-Vincent-de-Salers (15218)
44. Salers (15219)
45. Salins (15220)
46. Sauvat (15223)
47. Sourniac (15230)
48. Trémouille (15240)
49. Trizac (15243)
50. Valette (15246)
51. Le Vaulmier (15249)
52. Vebret (15250)
53. Veyrières (15254)
54. Le Vigean (15261)
55. Ydes (15265)

== History ==
The arrondissement of Mauriac was created in 1800.

As a result of the reorganisation of the cantons of France which came into effect in 2015, the borders of the cantons are no longer related to the borders of the arrondissements. The cantons of the arrondissement of Mauriac were, as of January 2015:

1. Champs-sur-Tarentaine-Marchal
2. Mauriac
3. Pleaux
4. Riom-ès-Montagnes
5. Saignes
6. Salers
