= Salin =

Salin may refer to:

Places

- Salin Township, township of Minbu District in the Magway Region of Myanmar
  - Salin, Myanmar, a town in Minbu District in the Magway Region of Myanmar
- Salín, mountain in the Andes of Argentina

Other

- Salin (surname)
- Sálin, shorter name for the Icelandic rock band Sálin hans Jóns míns
- Kasper Salin Prize, Swedish architecture prize

== See also ==
- Saline (disambiguation)
- Salins (disambiguation)
