= Salado River =

Salado River or Río Salado may refer to:

== Rivers ==
=== Argentina ===
- Salado River (Argentina), a tributary of the Paraná River
- Salado River (Buenos Aires), starts at the El Chañar lagoon and runs 650 kilometres to Samborombón Bay
- Salado River (La Rioja), in Catamarca Province and La Rioja Province
- Desaguadero River, a tributary of the Colorado River

=== Chile ===
- Salado River (Antofagasta)

=== Cuba ===
- Salado River (Cuba)

=== Mexico ===
- Rio Salado (Mexico), a tributary of the Rio Grande (Río Bravo)
- Salado River (Oaxaca)

=== Paraguay ===
- Salado River (Paraguay)

=== United States ===
- Salt River (Arizona), a tributary of the Gila River
- Rio Salado (New Mexico), a tributary of the Rio Grande

== Other uses ==
- Rio Salado Brewing Company, Tempe, Arizona
- Rio Salado College, Tempe, Arizona
- El Malah, formerly Rio Salado, a municipality in Algeria

== See also ==
- Salado (disambiguation)
- Saline River (disambiguation)
