= Saint-Bonnet-de-Salers =

Commune in Auvergne-Rhône-Alpes, France

- Commune
- Location of Saint-Bonnet-de-Salers
- Location within France Location within Auvergne-Rhône-Alpes
- Coordinates: 45°09′41″N 2°27′14″E
- Country: France
- Region: Auvergne-Rhône-Alpes
- Department: Cantal
- Arrondissement: Mauriac
- Canton: Mauriac
- Intercommunality: Pays de Salers

Government
  - Mayor (2021–2026): Claude Ribeyrotte
- Area^{1}: 32.67 km^{2} (12.61 sq mi)
- Elevation: 888 m (2,913 ft)
- Highest elevation: 1,350 m (4,430 ft)
- Lowest elevation: 720 m (2,360 ft)
- Population (2023): 246
  - Density: 7.53/km^{2} (19.5/sq mi)
- Time zone: UTC+01:00 (CET)
  - Summer (DST): UTC+02:00 (CEST)
- INSEE/Postal code: 15174 /15140
- ^{1} French Land Register data, which excludes lakes, ponds, glaciers > 1 km^{2} (0.386 sq mi or 247 acres) and river estuaries.

Saint-Bonnet-de-Salers (French pronunciation: [sɛ̃ bɔnɛ də salɛʁ], literally Saint-Bonnet of Salers; Auvergnat: Sant Bonet de Salèrn) is a commune in the Cantal department in south-central France.

== Population ==
Historical population
Year	Pop.	±% p.a.
1968	549	—
1975	507	−1.13%
1982	438	−2.07%
1990	402	−1.07%
1999	330	−2.17%
2007	331	+0.04%
2012	304	−1.69%
2017	273	−2.13%
2023	246	−1.72%
Source: INSEE

== See also ==
- Communes of the Cantal department
