= Saint-Projet-de-Salers =

Commune in Auvergne-Rhône-Alpes, France

- Commune
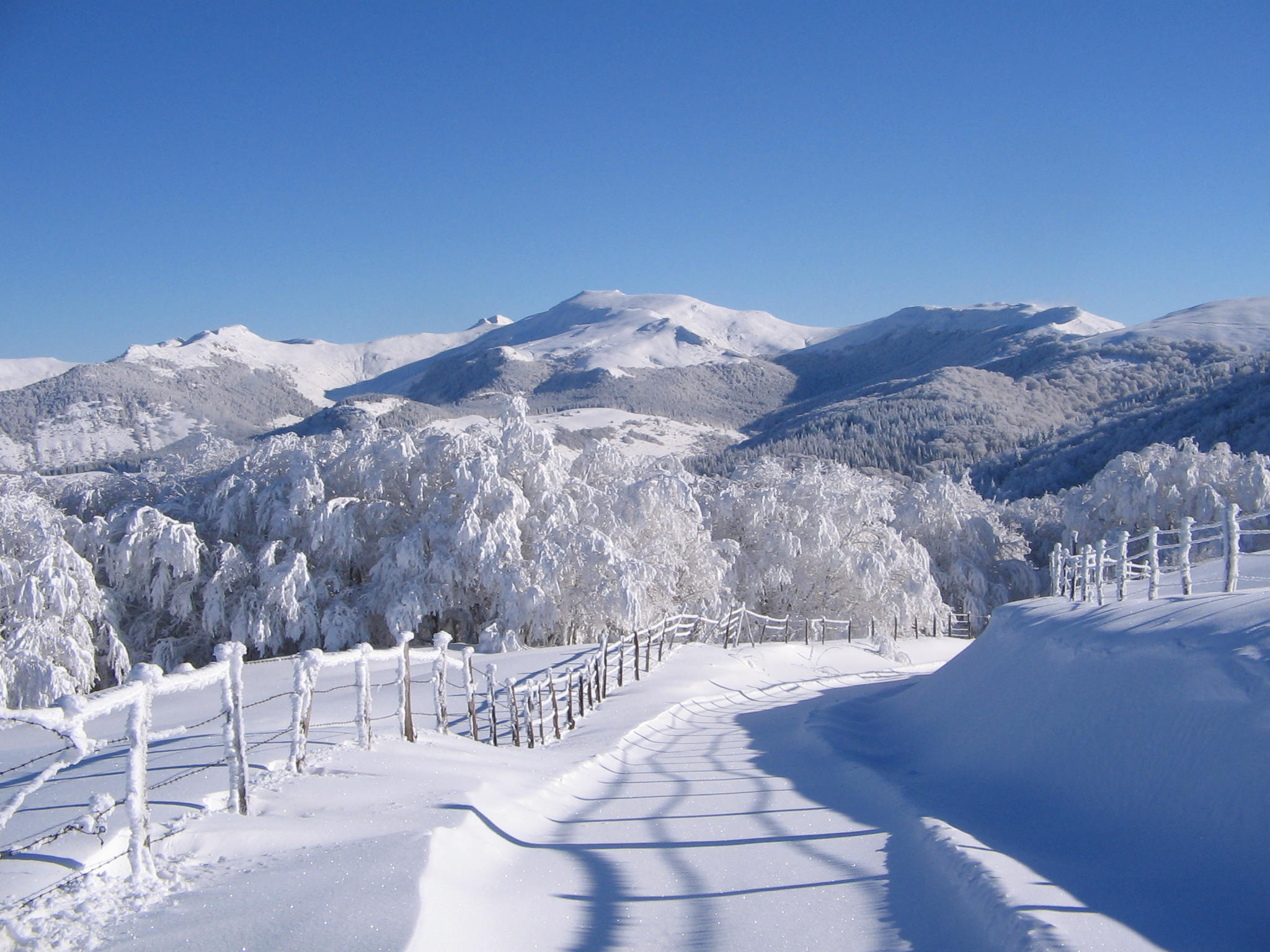
- The Col de Légal
- Location of Saint-Projet-de-Salers
- Location within France Location within Auvergne-Rhône-Alpes
- Coordinates: 45°05′11″N 2°31′39″E
- Country: France
- Region: Auvergne-Rhône-Alpes
- Department: Cantal
- Arrondissement: Mauriac
- Canton: Naucelles
- Intercommunality: Pays de Salers

Government
  - Mayor (2020–2026): Pierre Lafon
- Area^{1}: 36.32 km^{2} (14.02 sq mi)
- Elevation: 800 m (2,600 ft)
- Highest elevation: 1,736 m (5,696 ft)
- Lowest elevation: 720 m (2,360 ft)
- Population (2023): 133
  - Density: 3.66/km^{2} (9.48/sq mi)
- Time zone: UTC+01:00 (CET)
  - Summer (DST): UTC+02:00 (CEST)
- INSEE/Postal code: 15208 /15140
- ^{1} French Land Register data, which excludes lakes, ponds, glaciers > 1 km^{2} (0.386 sq mi or 247 acres) and river estuaries.

Saint-Projet-de-Salers (French pronunciation: [sɛ̃ pʁɔʒɛ də salɛʁ], literally Saint-Projet of Salers; Occitan: Sent Prejet) is a commune in the Cantal department in south-central France.

== Population ==
Historical population
Year	Pop.	±% p.a.
1968	325	—
1975	225	−5.12%
1982	186	−2.68%
1990	157	−2.10%
1999	117	−3.21%
2007	125	+0.83%
2012	121	−0.65%
2017	138	+2.66%
2023	133	−0.61%
Source: INSEE

== See also ==
- Communes of the Cantal department
