= Saint-Paul-de-Salers =

Commune in Auvergne-Rhône-Alpes, France

- Commune
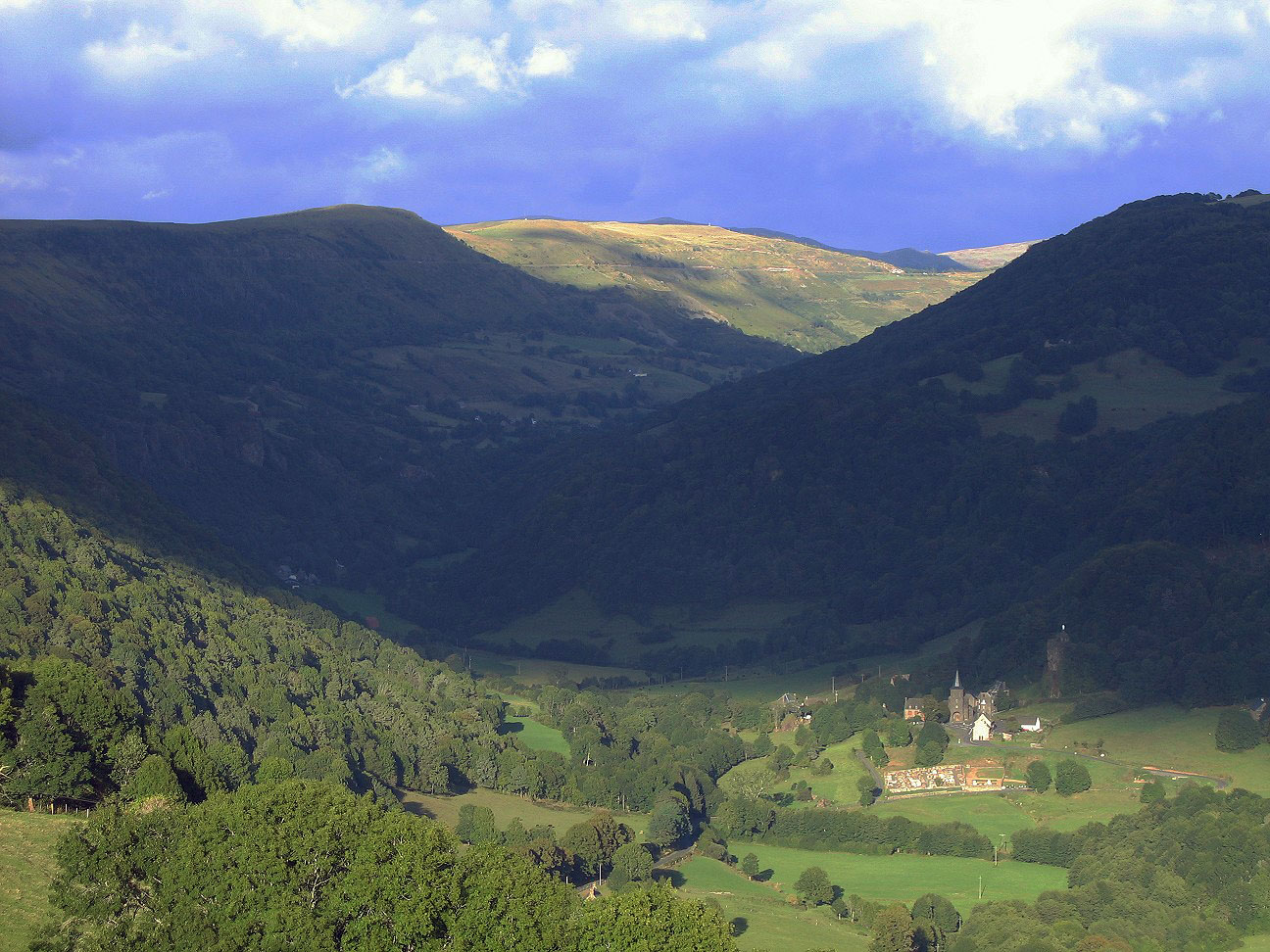
- Saint-Paul-de-Salers, seen from Salers
- Location of Saint-Paul-de-Salers
- Location within France Location within Auvergne-Rhône-Alpes
- Coordinates: 45°08′26″N 2°31′02″E
- Country: France
- Region: Auvergne-Rhône-Alpes
- Department: Cantal
- Arrondissement: Mauriac
- Canton: Mauriac
- Intercommunality: Pays de Salers

Government
  - Mayor (2024–2026): Laurent Geneix
- Area^{1}: 36.57 km^{2} (14.12 sq mi)
- Elevation: 800 m (2,600 ft)
- Highest elevation: 1,642 m (5,387 ft)
- Lowest elevation: 689 m (2,260 ft)
- Population (2023): 105
  - Density: 2.87/km^{2} (7.44/sq mi)
- Time zone: UTC+01:00 (CET)
  - Summer (DST): UTC+02:00 (CEST)
- INSEE/Postal code: 15205 /15140
- ^{1} French Land Register data, which excludes lakes, ponds, glaciers > 1 km^{2} (0.386 sq mi or 247 acres) and river estuaries.

Saint-Paul-de-Salers (French pronunciation: [sɛ̃ pɔl də salɛʁ], literally Saint-Paul of Salers; Occitan: Sant Pau de SalèrnAuvergnat: Sant Pau de Salèrn) is a commune in the Cantal department in south-central France.

== Geography ==
The Maronne river has its source in the commune.

== Population ==
Historical population
| Year | Pop. | ±% p.a. |
|---|---|---|
| 1968 | 455 | — |
| 1975 | 329 | −4.53% |
| 1982 | 195 | −7.20% |
| 1990 | 164 | −2.14% |
| 1999 | 147 | −1.21% |
| 2007 | 122 | −2.30% |
| 2012 | 111 | −1.87% |
| 2017 | 105 | −1.11% |
| 2023 | 105 | +0.00% |
Source: INSEE

== See also ==
- Communes of the Cantal department
