= Fontanges =

Commune in Auvergne-Rhône-Alpes, France

- Commune
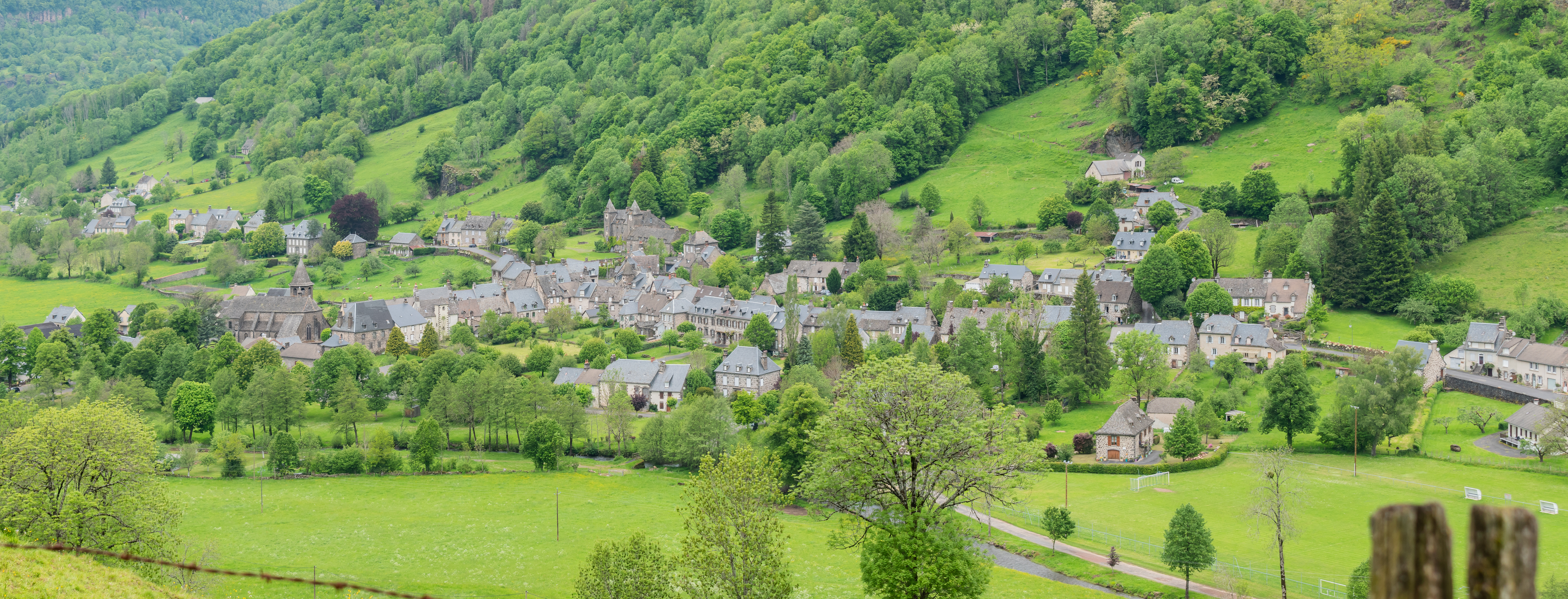
- A general view of Fontanges

- Coat of arms
- Location of Fontanges
- Location within France Location within Auvergne-Rhône-Alpes
- Coordinates: 45°06′52″N 2°30′17″E
- Country: France
- Region: Auvergne-Rhône-Alpes
- Department: Cantal
- Arrondissement: Mauriac
- Canton: Mauriac
- Intercommunality: Pays de Salers

Government
  - Mayor (2020–2026): Michel Constant
- Area^{1}: 18.04 km^{2} (6.97 sq mi)
- Elevation: 630 m (2,070 ft)
- Highest elevation: 1,246 m (4,088 ft)
- Lowest elevation: 664 m (2,178 ft)
- Population (2023): 213
  - Density: 11.8/km^{2} (30.6/sq mi)
- Time zone: UTC+01:00 (CET)
  - Summer (DST): UTC+02:00 (CEST)
- INSEE/Postal code: 15070 /15140
- ^{1} French Land Register data, which excludes lakes, ponds, glaciers > 1 km^{2} (0.386 sq mi or 247 acres) and river estuaries.

Fontanges (French pronunciation: [fɔ̃tɑ̃ʒ]; Occitan: Fontanjas) is a commune in the Cantal department in south-central France.

== Geography ==
The small river Aspre, a tributary of the Maronne, flows through the commune.

== Population ==
Historical population
Year	Pop.	±% p.a.
1968	454	—
1975	353	−3.53%
1982	307	−1.97%
1990	292	−0.62%
1999	241	−2.11%
2007	222	−1.02%
2012	211	−1.01%
2017	199	−1.16%
2023	213	+1.14%
Source: INSEE

== See also ==
- Communes of the Cantal department
