= Salado =

Salado is a Spanish adjective meaning "salty", and may refer to:

- Salado, Arkansas, community in Independence County
- Salado, Sonora, a small community in Álamos Municipality
- Salado, Tamaulipas, former town in the state of Tamaulipas, Mexico
- Salado, Texas, village in Bell County
- Salado Creek, in Bexar County, Texas
  - Battle of Salado Creek (1842)
- Salado Creek AVA, wine region in Stanislaus County, California
- Salado culture, multicultural group in today's Southwestern U.S., from the 12th through 15th centuries CE
- Saladoblanco, town and municipality in Colombia

== See also ==
- Salado River (disambiguation)
