= Sainte-Eulalie, Cantal =

Commune in Auvergne-Rhône-Alpes, France

Sainte-Eulalie
- Commune
- Location of Sainte-Eulalie
- Location within France Location within Auvergne-Rhône-Alpes
- Coordinates: 45°07′07″N 2°22′28″E
- Country: France
- Region: Auvergne-Rhône-Alpes
- Department: Cantal
- Arrondissement: Mauriac
- Canton: Mauriac
- Intercommunality: Pays de Salers

Government
  - Mayor (2020–2026): Albert Rochette
- Area^{1}: 14.51 km^{2} (5.60 sq mi)
- Elevation: 588 m (1,929 ft)
- Highest elevation: 828 m (2,717 ft)
- Lowest elevation: 560 m (1,840 ft)
- Population (2023): 230
  - Density: 16/km^{2} (41/sq mi)
- Time zone: UTC+01:00 (CET)
  - Summer (DST): UTC+02:00 (CEST)
- INSEE/Postal code: 15186 /15140
- ^{1} French Land Register data, which excludes lakes, ponds, glaciers > 1 km^{2} (0.386 sq mi or 247 acres) and river estuaries.

Sainte-Eulalie (French pronunciation: [sɛ̃t ølali]; Auvergnat: Santa Alària) is a commune in the Cantal department in south-central France.

== Geography ==
The Maronne river flows through the middle of the commune.

== Population ==
Historical population
| Year | Pop. | ±% p.a. |
|---|---|---|
| 1968 | 400 | — |
| 1975 | 315 | −3.36% |
| 1982 | 273 | −2.02% |
| 1990 | 225 | −2.39% |
| 1999 | 219 | −0.30% |
| 2007 | 206 | −0.76% |
| 2012 | 203 | −0.29% |
| 2017 | 219 | +1.53% |
| 2023 | 230 | +0.82% |
Source: INSEE

== See also ==
- Communes of the Cantal department
