= Salinas =

Salinas may refer to:

== People ==
- Salinas (surname)

== Places ==
=== Americas ===
==== Latin America ====
- Salinas (ancient lake), in the Salar de Uyuni, Bolivia
- Salinas, Minas Gerais, a municipality in the state of Minas Gerais, Brazil
- Playa Grande, Costa Rica, a beach town, also known as Salinas
- Las Salinas, town in the Dominican Republic
- Salinas de Guaranda, an Andean mountain village in Ecuador
- Salinas, Ecuador, a coastal city in Santa Elena, Ecuador
- Salinas, a parish in Ibarra Canton, Ecuador
- Salinas Victoria, a municipality in the state of Nuevo León, Mexico
- Salinas de Hidalgo, in the Mexican state of San Luis Potosí
- Salinas y Aguada Blanca National Reserve, Peru
  - Salinas Lake, a salt lake in Arequipa Province, Peru
- Salinas, Puerto Rico, a municipality in the south coast of Puerto Rico
- Salinas, Uruguay, a town in Uruguay

==== United States ====
- Salinas River (California)
- Salinas Valley, in Monterey County, California
- Salinas, California, the county seat and largest municipality of Monterey County
- Salinas Assembly Center, a temporary detention camp for citizens and immigrant residents of Japanese ancestry during World War II
- Salinas Intermodal Transportation Center, the train depot serving Salinas.

=== Spain ===
- Salinas, Alicante, a municipality in Alicante province
- Salinas de Añana, Álava, a municipality in Álava
- Salinas de Léniz (Leintz-Gatzaga in Basque), a municipality in Guipúzcoa
- Salinas de Oro, a municipality in Navarre
- Salinas (Castrillón), a parish in the council of Castrillón, Asturias

=== Philippines ===
- Salinas, an alternate name for the municipality of Rosario, Cavite
- Salinas Natural Monument, a protected area in Nueva Vizcaya

== See also ==
- Salinas River (disambiguation)
- Salina (disambiguation)
- Salinan, a native people and language of Monterey County, California
