= Château de Branzac =

Ruined 15th-century castle in Cantal, France

Coordinates: 45°6′46″N 2°19′26″E

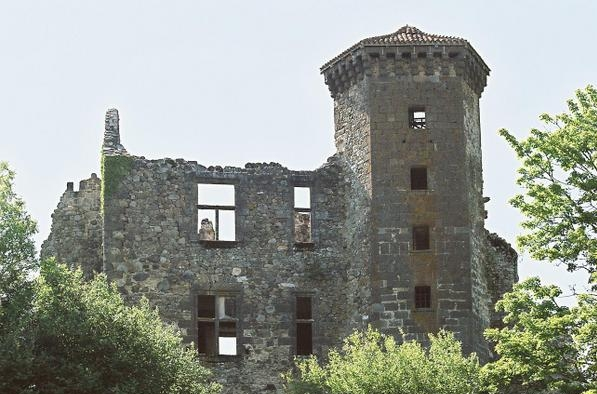
South face of the castle

The Château de Branzac is a ruined 15th century castle in the commune of Pleaux in the Cantal département of France. Being a massive keep with corner towers, the castle is a picturesque ruin on the end of a promontory.

The castle was built as a manor house or hunting lodge in the 15th century. It was built as a long rectangle with four floors, two rooms per floor. In the centre of the main façade is a tower with a staircase and, on the opposite side, two round corner towers. The castle was ruined when dynamite was used to demolish one of the corner towers, so that materials could be used to build a railway viaduct. The castle was entirely decorated with frescoes made by Italians in 1575, partially covered with more lighthearted scenes in 1610.

Privately owned, it has been listed since 1921 as a monument historique by the French Ministry of Culture.

== See also ==
- List of castles in France
