= Salines =

Salines may refer to:

- Salines, Illyria (Ancient Greek: Σαλήνες), a settlement identified with modern-day Tuzla, Bosnia and Herzegovina
- Antonio Salines (1936–2021), Italian actor and director
- Plural of Saline (disambiguation)
