= Saint-Martin-Valmeroux =

Commune in Auvergne-Rhône-Alpes, France

- Commune
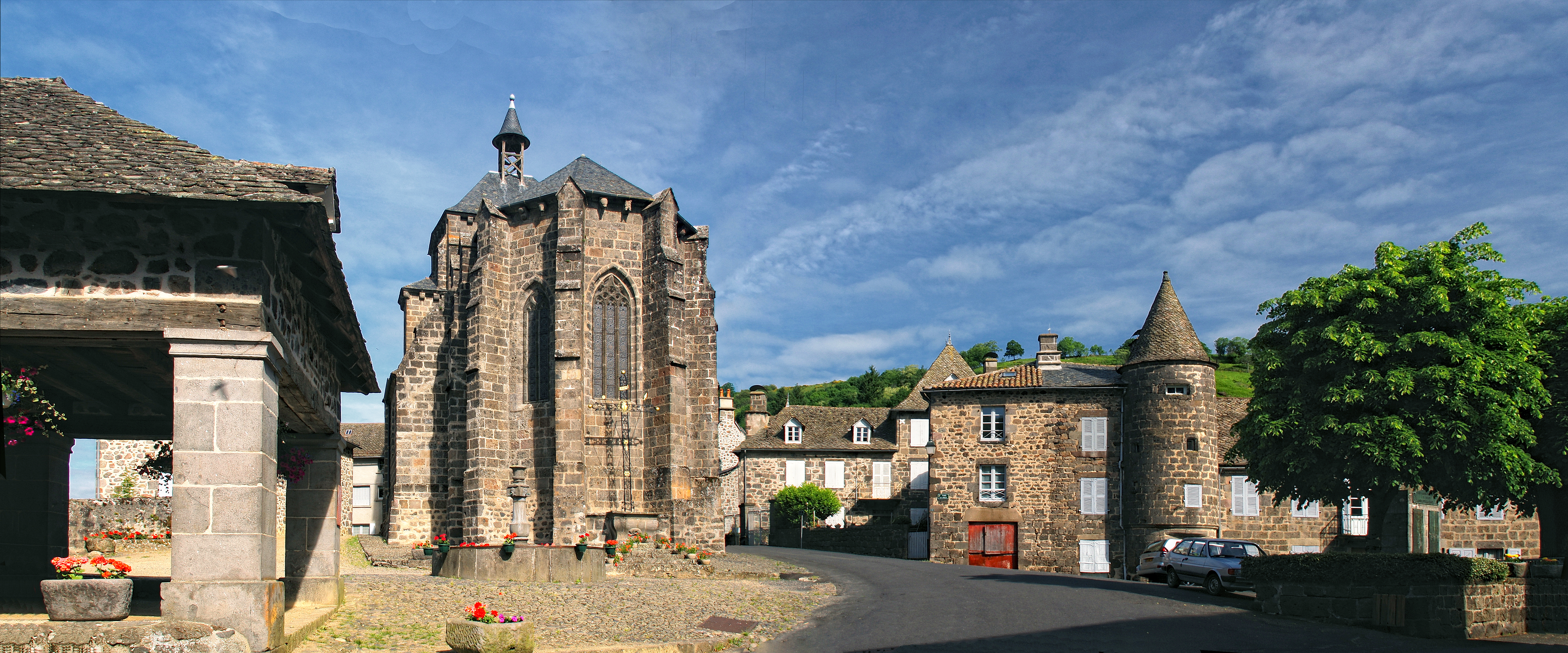
- A panoramic view within Saint-Martin-Valmeroux

- Coat of arms
- Location of Saint-Martin-Valmeroux
- Location within France Location within Auvergne-Rhône-Alpes
- Coordinates: 45°07′06″N 2°25′33″E
- Country: France
- Region: Auvergne-Rhône-Alpes
- Department: Cantal
- Arrondissement: Mauriac
- Canton: Mauriac
- Intercommunality: Pays de Salers

Government
  - Mayor (2020–2026): Christian Fournier
- Area^{1}: 25.92 km^{2} (10.01 sq mi)
- Elevation: 650 m (2,130 ft)
- Highest elevation: 963 m (3,159 ft)
- Lowest elevation: 609 m (1,998 ft)
- Population (2023): 716
  - Density: 27.6/km^{2} (71.5/sq mi)
- Time zone: UTC+01:00 (CET)
  - Summer (DST): UTC+02:00 (CEST)
- INSEE/Postal code: 15202 /15140
- ^{1} French Land Register data, which excludes lakes, ponds, glaciers > 1 km^{2} (0.386 sq mi or 247 acres) and river estuaries.

Saint-Martin-Valmeroux (French pronunciation: [sɛ̃ maʁtɛ̃ valməʁu]；Occitan: Sant Martin de Valmaron) is a commune in the Cantal department in south-central France. In January 1973, it absorbed the former commune Saint-Rémy-de-Salers.

== Geography ==
The Maronne river flows through the middle of the commune and crosses the village of Saint-Martin-Valmeroux.

== Population ==
Historical population
Year	Pop.	±% p.a.
1968	1,145	—
1975	1,099	−0.58%
1982	1,009	−1.21%
1990	1,012	+0.04%
1999	911	−1.16%
2007	866	−0.63%
2012	826	−0.94%
2017	734	−2.33%
2023	716	−0.41%
Source: INSEE

== See also ==
- Communes of the Cantal department
