= Alain Marleix =

French politician

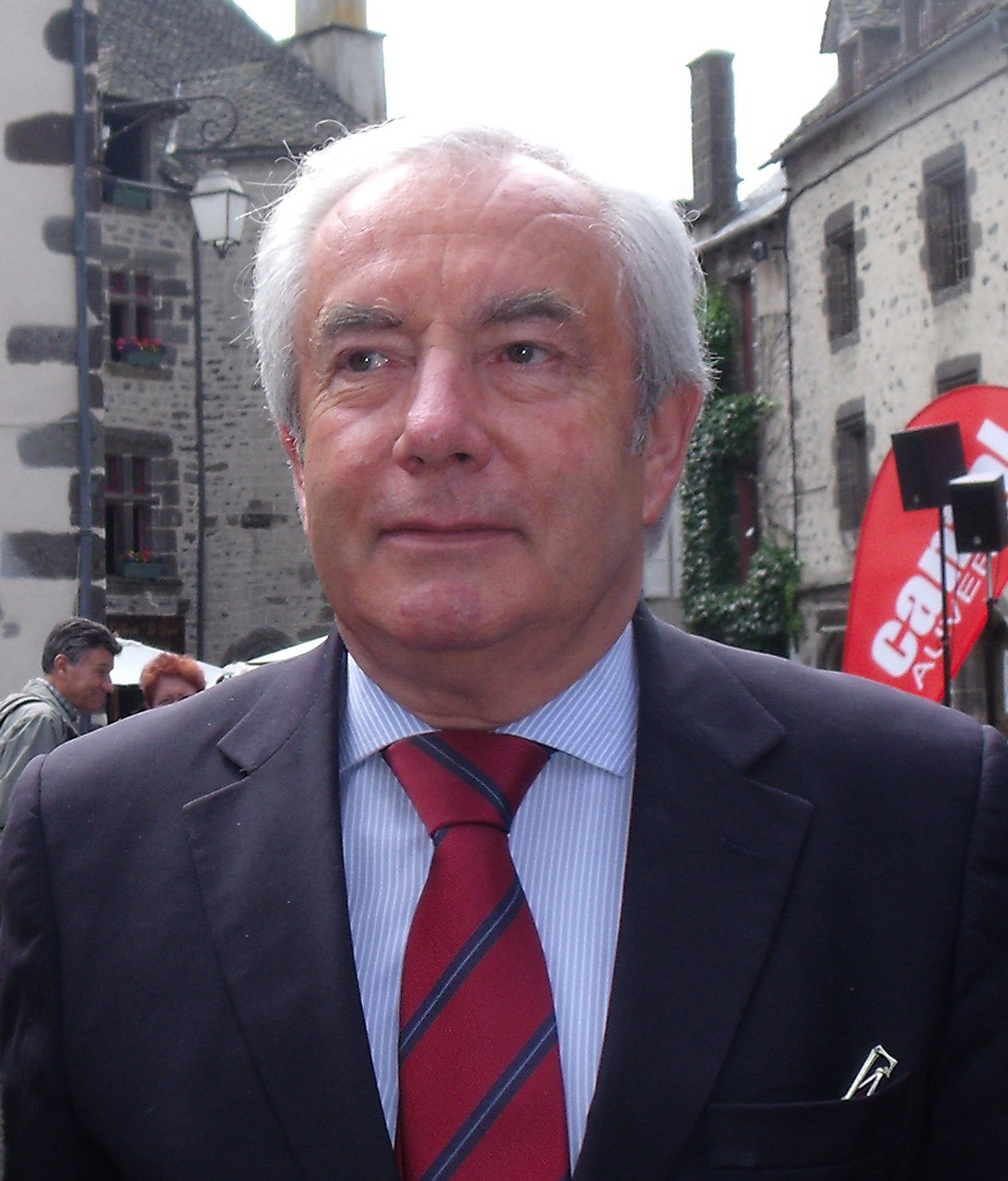

Member of the National Assembly for Cantal's 2nd constituency
- In office 14 December 2010 – 20 June 2017
- Preceded by: Jean-Yves Bony
- Succeeded by: Jean-Yves Bony
- In office 2 April 1993 – 19 July 2007
- Preceded by: Pierre Raynal
- Succeeded by: Jean-Yves Bony

Secretary of state for Veterans
- In office 18 June 2007 – 18 March 2008
- President: Nicolas Sarkozy
- Prime Minister: François Fillon
- Preceded by: Hamlaoui Mekachera
- Succeeded by: Jean-Marie Bockel

Personal details
- Born: 2 January 1946 (age 80) Paris, France
- Party: The Republicans
- Relatives: Olivier Marleix (son; d. 2025)
- Education: ÉHESS

Alain Marleix (born 2 January 1946) is a French politician. He was the Secretary of State for Veterans in the government of François Fillon from June 2007 to March 2008. From 2008 to 2010, he was in charge of the redefinition of Boundary delimitation for the elections to the National Assembly.

Alain Marleix began his political career as a vice-representative for Georges Pompidou in the Assembléee Nationale, who was then representative for Saint-Flour in the Cantal. Alain Marleix was initially close to Charles Pasqua. During the 1995 presidential election, he supported Édouard Balladur against Jacques Chirac. Since then, he has been supporting Nicolas Sarkozy.

- Degree from École supérieure de journalisme de Lille
- Degree of political science
- Parliamentary journalist, head of the political department of the daily La Nation, from 1968 to 1976

== Political career ==
Governmental functions

Secretary of State for Veterans: 2007-2008.
Secretary of State for Local Authorities: 2008-2010.

Electoral mandates
European Parliament

Member of European Parliament: 1984-1993 (Resignation). Elected in 1984, reelected in 1989.

National Assembly of France

Member of the National Assembly of France for Cantal (2nd constituency): 1993-2007 (Became secretary of State in 2007) / And since 2010. Elected in 1993, reelected in 1997, 2002, 2007, 2012.

Regional Council

Regional councillor of Auvergne: Since 2010.

General Council

General councillor of Cantal: Since 1988. Reelected in 1994, 2001, 2008.

Municipal Council

Mayor of Massiac: 1995-2008. Reelected in 2001.
Municipal councillor of Massiac: 1995-2008. Reelected in 2001.

== Political functions ==
- National secretary of UMP, in charge of elections, since 2005
