= Salina =

Salina may refer to:

== Places ==
=== United States ===
- Salina, Arizona
- Salina, Colorado
- Salina, Iowa
- Salina, Kansas
- Salina, Michigan, a former village now part of Saginaw, Michigan
- Salina, New York
- Salina, Oklahoma
- Salina, Pennsylvania
- Salina, Utah

=== Other places ===
- Saliña, Curaçao, a Dutch Caribbean residential area
- Salina, alternate name for Larnaca, Cyprus
- Salina, Sicily, an Italian island
- Salina, Malta.

== People ==
=== Surname ===
- Anastasia Salina (born 1988), Russian volleyball player
- Darío Salina (born 1995), Argentine football player
- Daymaro Salina (born 1987), Portuguese handball player
- Irena Salina (born 1978), French film director

=== Given name ===
- Salina de la Renta, ring name of Natalia Guzmán Class (born 1997), Puerto Rican professional wrestler and valet
- Salina EsTitties, American drag queen
- Salina Fisher (born 1993), New Zealand composer and violinist
- Salina Kosgei (born 1976), Kenyan long-distance runner
- Salina Olsson (born 1978), Swedish football player
- Salina Prakash, Indian actress

== Other uses ==
- Salina (springtail), a genus of the family Paronellidae
- Prince of Salina, a fictional character in the novel The Leopard by Giuseppe Tomasi di Lampedusa

== See also ==
- Salt marsh
- Salt pan (geology)
- Selina
- Salinas (disambiguation)
- Saline (disambiguation)
