= Chaussenac =

Commune in Auvergne-Rhône-Alpes, France

- Commune
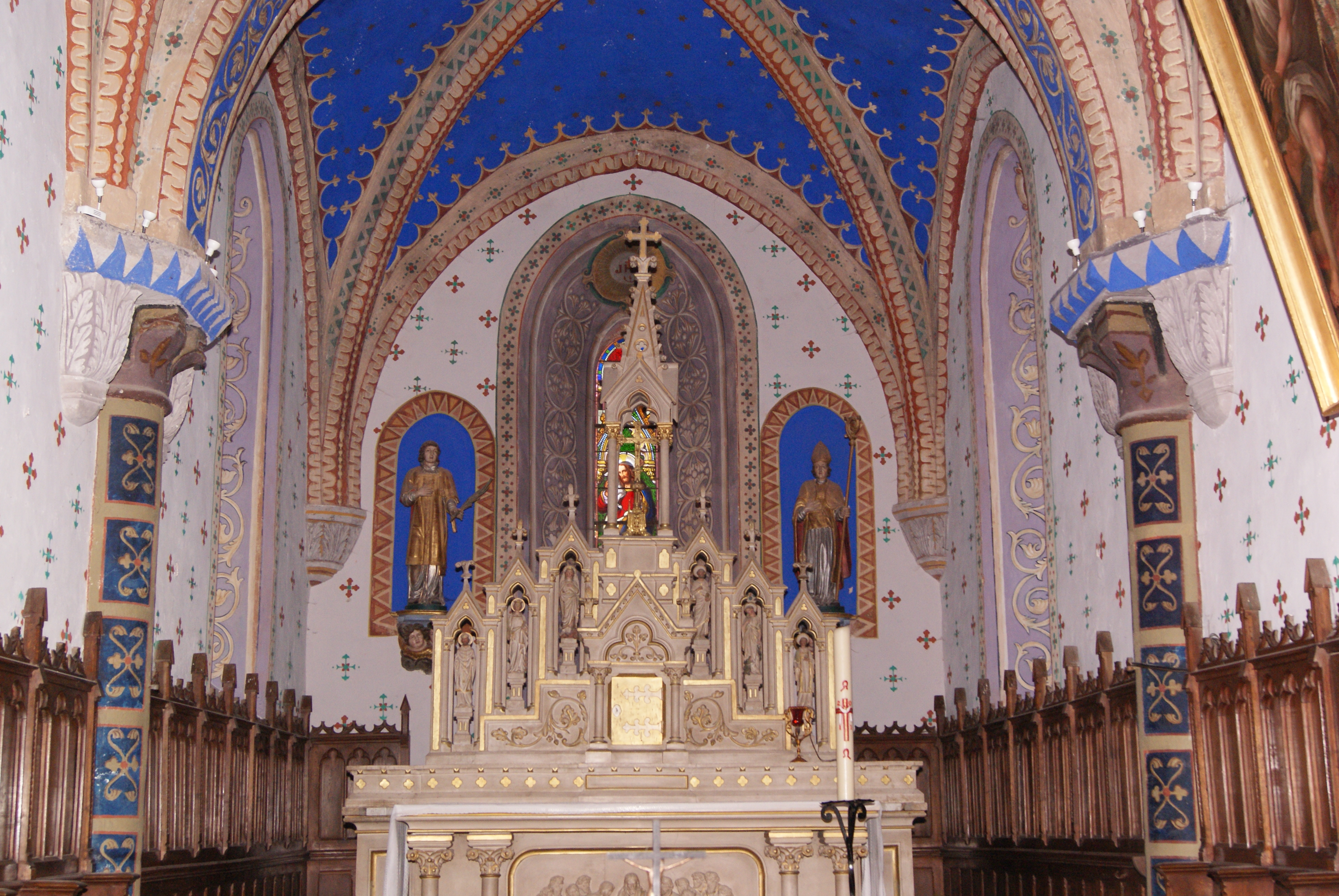
- The interior of the church in Chaussenac
- Location of Chaussenac
- Location within France Location within Auvergne-Rhône-Alpes
- Coordinates: 45°10′43″N 2°16′45″E
- Country: France
- Region: Auvergne-Rhône-Alpes
- Department: Cantal
- Arrondissement: Mauriac
- Canton: Mauriac
- Intercommunality: Pays de Salers

Government
  - Mayor (2020–2026): Jean-Marc Delbos
- Area^{1}: 16.13 km^{2} (6.23 sq mi)
- Elevation: 650 m (2,130 ft)
- Highest elevation: 723 m (2,372 ft)
- Lowest elevation: 360 m (1,180 ft)
- Population (2023): 218
  - Density: 13.5/km^{2} (35.0/sq mi)
- Time zone: UTC+01:00 (CET)
  - Summer (DST): UTC+02:00 (CEST)
- INSEE/Postal code: 15046 /15700
- ^{1} French Land Register data, which excludes lakes, ponds, glaciers > 1 km^{2} (0.386 sq mi or 247 acres) and river estuaries.

Chaussenac is a commune in the Cantal department in south-central France.

== Population ==
Historical population
Year	Pop.	±% p.a.
1968	438	—
1975	405	−1.11%
1982	340	−2.47%
1990	259	−3.34%
1999	232	−1.22%
2007	243	+0.58%
2012	232	−0.92%
2017	219	−1.15%
2023	218	−0.08%
Source: INSEE

== See also ==
- Communes of the Cantal department
