= Le Fau =

Commune in Auvergne-Rhône-Alpes, France

- Commune
- Location of Le Fau
- Location within France Location within Auvergne-Rhône-Alpes
- Coordinates: 45°06′08″N 2°35′06″E
- Country: France
- Region: Auvergne-Rhône-Alpes
- Department: Cantal
- Arrondissement: Mauriac
- Canton: Mauriac
- Intercommunality: Pays de Salers

Government
  - Mayor (2020–2026): Pierre Mennesson
- Area^{1}: 19.46 km^{2} (7.51 sq mi)
- Elevation: 950 m (3,120 ft)
- Highest elevation: 1,650 m (5,410 ft)
- Lowest elevation: 793 m (2,602 ft)
- Population (2023): 34
  - Density: 1.7/km^{2} (4.5/sq mi)
- Time zone: UTC+01:00 (CET)
  - Summer (DST): UTC+02:00 (CEST)
- INSEE/Postal code: 15067 /15140
- ^{1} French Land Register data, which excludes lakes, ponds, glaciers > 1 km^{2} (0.386 sq mi or 247 acres) and river estuaries.

Le Fau (French pronunciation: [lə fo]; Occitan: Lo Fau) is a commune in the Cantal department in Auvergne, south-central France.

It is a small community built around winter sports and tourism. It has a campsite at the Domaine Lissart de Miège.

== Population ==
Historical population
| Year | Pop. | ±% p.a. |
|---|---|---|
| 1968 | 152 | — |
| 1975 | 89 | −7.36% |
| 1982 | 80 | −1.51% |
| 1990 | 60 | −3.53% |
| 1999 | 37 | −5.23% |
| 2007 | 28 | −3.42% |
| 2012 | 27 | −0.72% |
| 2017 | 29 | +1.44% |
| 2023 | 34 | +2.69% |
Source: INSEE

== See also ==
- Communes of the Cantal department
