= Saint-Martin-Cantalès =

Commune in Auvergne-Rhône-Alpes, France

- Commune
- Location of Saint-Martin-Cantalès
- Location within France Location within Auvergne-Rhône-Alpes
- Coordinates: 45°05′35″N 2°18′10″E
- Country: France
- Region: Auvergne-Rhône-Alpes
- Department: Cantal
- Arrondissement: Mauriac
- Canton: Mauriac
- Intercommunality: Pays de Salers

Government
  - Mayor (2020–2026): Pascal Escure
- Area^{1}: 19.59 km^{2} (7.56 sq mi)
- Elevation: 630 m (2,070 ft)
- Highest elevation: 736 m (2,415 ft)
- Lowest elevation: 421 m (1,381 ft)
- Population (2023): 157
  - Density: 8.01/km^{2} (20.8/sq mi)
- Time zone: UTC+01:00 (CET)
  - Summer (DST): UTC+02:00 (CEST)
- INSEE/Postal code: 15200 /15140
- ^{1} French Land Register data, which excludes lakes, ponds, glaciers > 1 km^{2} (0.386 sq mi or 247 acres) and river estuaries.

Saint-Martin-Cantalès (French pronunciation: [sɛ̃ maʁtɛ̃ kɑ̃talɛs]; Occitan: Sant Martin de Chantalés) is a commune in the Cantal department in south-central France.

== Geography ==
The Maronne river forms the commune's northern border.

== Population ==
Historical population
Year	Pop.	±% p.a.
1968	338	—
1975	266	−3.36%
1982	223	−2.49%
1990	207	−0.93%
1999	185	−1.24%
2007	177	−0.55%
2012	160	−2.00%
2017	146	−1.81%
2023	157	+1.22%
Source: INSEE

== See also ==
- Communes of the Cantal department
