= Salins (surname) =

Salins may refer to the following people:

- Arthur Guyot de Salins
- Guigone de Salins (1403–1470), member of the nobility in Burgundy, France
- Gunars Saliņš (1924–2010), Latvian modernist poet
- Patrice Bailly-Salins (born 1964), French biathlete
- Robert Lamezan de Salins (1869–1930), also known as Robert Graf von Lamezan-Salins while in Austrian service, a Polish and Austro-Hungarian military officer

== See also ==
- Salin (surname)
