= Barriac-les-Bosquets =

Commune in Auvergne-Rhône-Alpes, France

- Commune
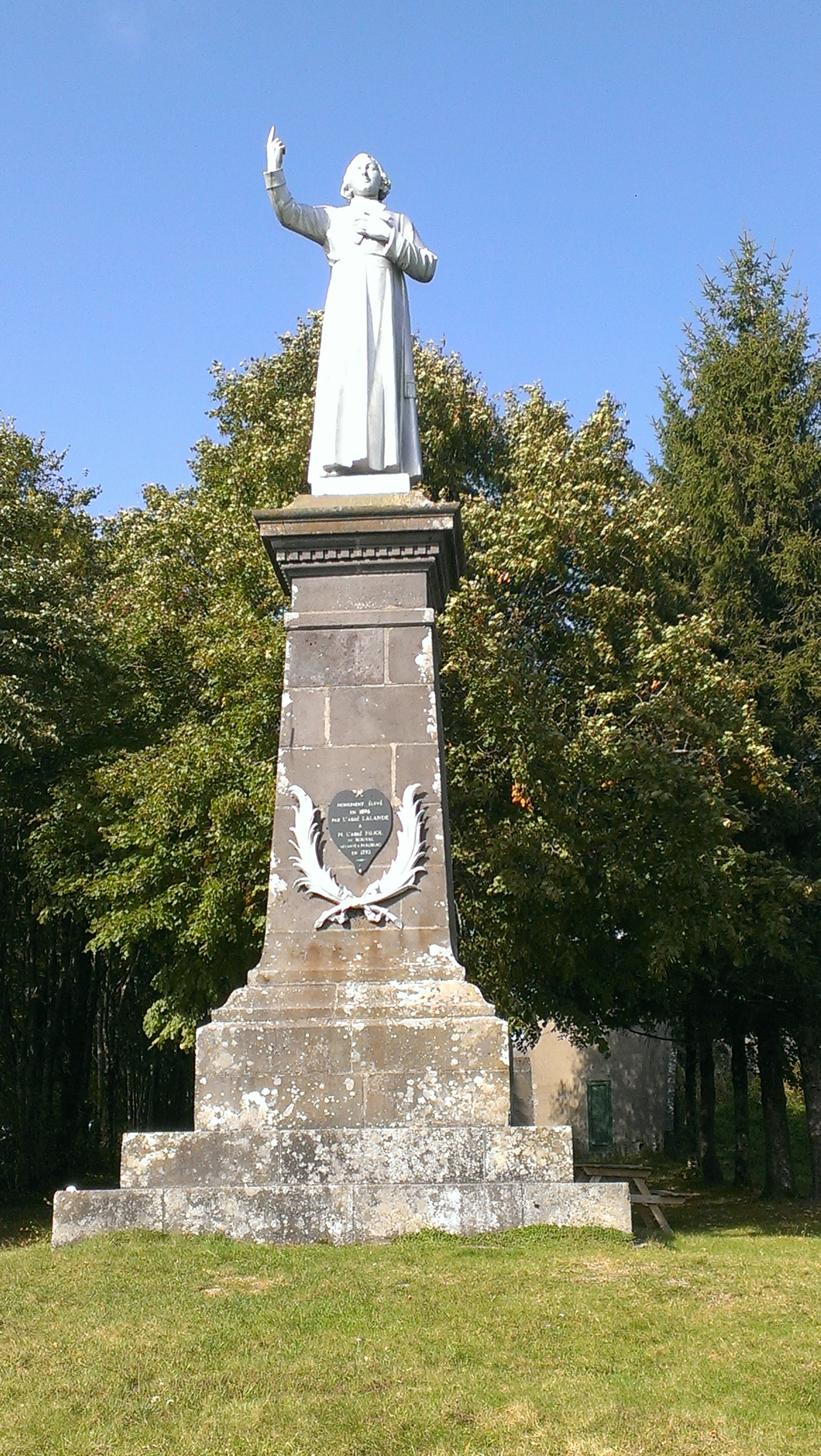
- The statue of Father Filiol, in Barriac-les-Bosquets

- Coat of arms
- Location of Barriac-les-Bosquets
- Location within France Location within Auvergne-Rhône-Alpes
- Coordinates: 45°08′40″N 2°15′37″E
- Country: France
- Region: Auvergne-Rhône-Alpes
- Department: Cantal
- Arrondissement: Mauriac
- Canton: Mauriac
- Intercommunality: Pays de Salers

Government
  - Mayor (2020–2026): Jean-Noël Parra
- Area^{1}: 12.8 km^{2} (4.9 sq mi)
- Elevation: 650 m (2,130 ft)
- Highest elevation: 737 m (2,418 ft)
- Lowest elevation: 555 m (1,821 ft)
- Population (2023): 140
  - Density: 11/km^{2} (28/sq mi)
- Time zone: UTC+01:00 (CET)
  - Summer (DST): UTC+02:00 (CEST)
- INSEE/Postal code: 15018 /15700
- ^{1} French Land Register data, which excludes lakes, ponds, glaciers > 1 km^{2} (0.386 sq mi or 247 acres) and river estuaries.

Barriac-les-Bosquets (French pronunciation: [baʁjak le bɔskɛ]; Occitan: Barriac) is a commune in the département of Cantal in south-central France.

== Population ==
Historical population
Year	Pop.	±% p.a.
1968	269	—
1975	228	−2.33%
1982	180	−3.32%
1990	180	+0.00%
1999	187	+0.42%
2007	168	−1.33%
2012	163	−0.60%
2017	124	−5.32%
2023	140	+2.04%
Source: INSEE

== See also ==
- Communes of the Cantal department
