= Canton of Mauriac =

Coordinates: 45.22°N 2.33°E

- Canton
- Situation of the canton of Mauriac in the department of Cantal
- Country: France
- Region: Auvergne-Rhône-Alpes
- Department: Cantal
- No. of communes: {{{nbcomm}}}
- Population (2023): 10,472
- INSEE code: 1505

The canton of Mauriac is an administrative division of the Cantal department, southern France. Its borders were modified at the French canton reorganisation which came into effect in March 2015. Its seat is in Mauriac.

It consists of the following communes:

1. Ally
2. Anglards-de-Salers
3. Barriac-les-Bosquets
4. Brageac
5. Chalvignac
6. Chaussenac
7. Drugeac
8. Escorailles
9. Le Fau
10. Fontanges
11. Mauriac
12. Pleaux
13. Saint-Bonnet-de-Salers
14. Sainte-Eulalie
15. Saint-Martin-Cantalès
16. Saint-Martin-Valmeroux
17. Saint-Paul-de-Salers
18. Salers
19. Salins
20. Le Vigean
