= Saline River =

Saline River may refer to:

== United States ==
- Saline River (Little River tributary), in southwestern Arkansas
- Saline River (Ouachita River tributary), in southern Arkansas
- Saline River (Illinois), a tributary of the Ohio River
- Saline River (Kansas), a tributary of the Smoky Hill River
  - Battle of the Saline River, August 1867
- Saline River (Michigan), a tributary of the River Raisin
- Saline Bayou, in Winn Parish, Louisiana, a tributary of the Red River

== Elsewhere ==
- Saline (Italian river), a river in Abruzzo

== See also ==
- Saline Branch, a tributary of the Vermilion River in Illinois, United States
- Saline Creek (disambiguation)
