= Brageac =

Commune in Auvergne-Rhône-Alpes, France

- Commune
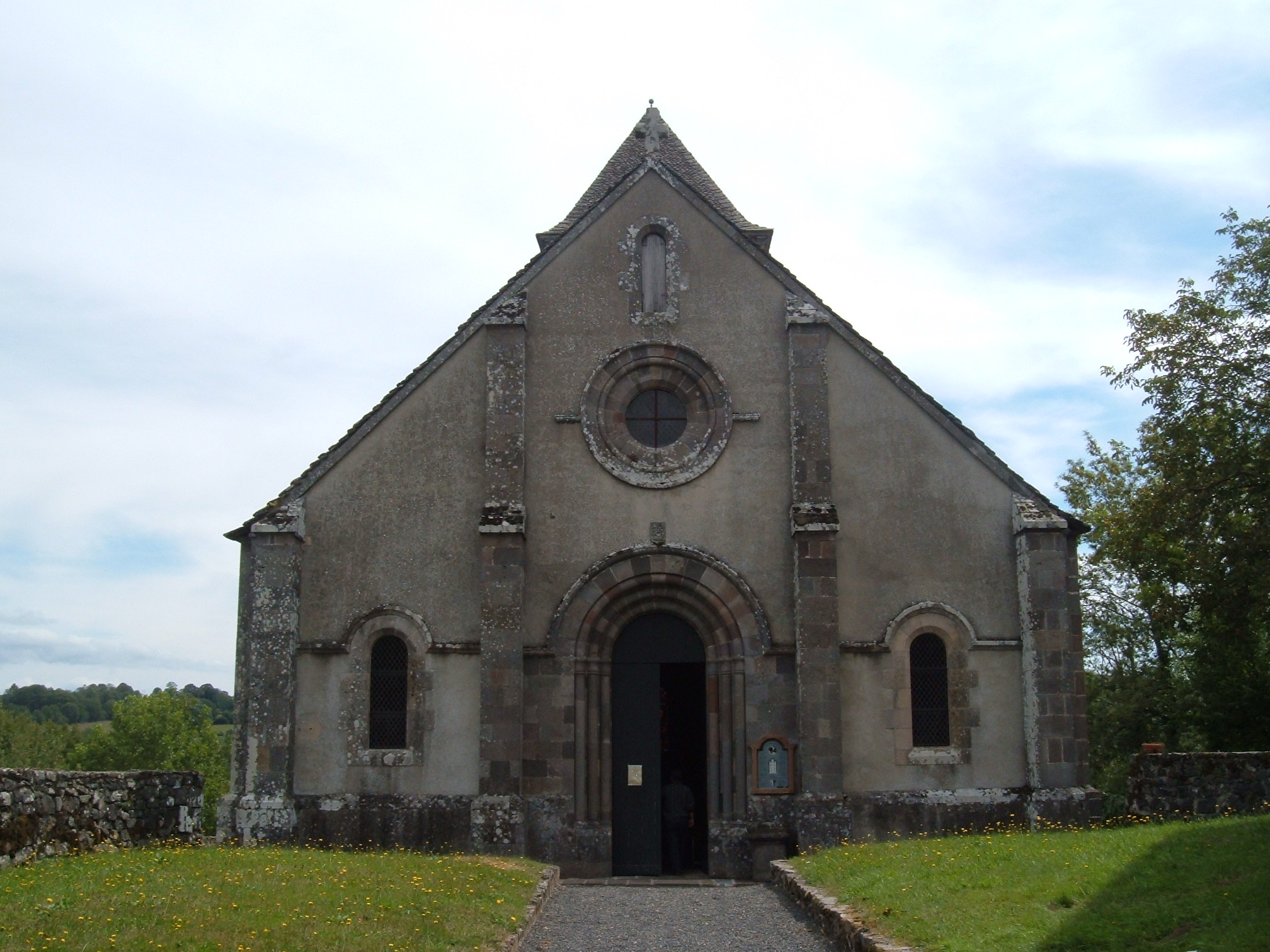
- The church of Saint-Thibaud, in Brageac
- Location of Brageac
- Location within France Location within Auvergne-Rhône-Alpes
- Coordinates: 45°12′18″N 2°17′20″E
- Country: France
- Region: Auvergne-Rhône-Alpes
- Department: Cantal
- Arrondissement: Mauriac
- Canton: Mauriac
- Intercommunality: Pays de Salers

Government
  - Mayor (2020–2026): Régine Breuil
- Area^{1}: 12.23 km^{2} (4.72 sq mi)
- Elevation: 720 m (2,360 ft)
- Highest elevation: 686 m (2,251 ft)
- Lowest elevation: 288 m (945 ft)
- Population (2023): 78
  - Density: 6.4/km^{2} (17/sq mi)
- Time zone: UTC+01:00 (CET)
  - Summer (DST): UTC+02:00 (CEST)
- INSEE/Postal code: 15024 /15700
- ^{1} French Land Register data, which excludes lakes, ponds, glaciers > 1 km^{2} (0.386 sq mi or 247 acres) and river estuaries.

Brageac (French pronunciation: [bʁaʒak]; Occitan: Brajac) is a commune in the Cantal department in south-central France.

== Population ==
Historical population
Year	Pop.	±% p.a.
1968	107	—
1975	92	−2.13%
1982	80	−1.98%
1990	64	−2.75%
1999	67	+0.51%
2007	75	+1.42%
2012	67	−2.23%
2017	76	+2.55%
2023	78	+0.43%
Source: INSEE

== See also ==
- Communes of the Cantal department
