= Saline Township =

Saline Township may refer to:

== Arkansas ==
- Saline Township, Cleburne County, Arkansas, in Cleburne County, Arkansas
- Saline Township, Cleveland County, Arkansas, in Cleveland County, Arkansas
- Saline Township, Drew County, Arkansas, in Drew County, Arkansas
- Saline Township, Hempstead County, Arkansas, in Hempstead County, Arkansas
- Saline Township, Hot Spring County, Arkansas, in Hot Spring County, Arkansas
- Saline Township, Howard County, Arkansas, in Howard County, Arkansas
- Saline Township, Pike County, Arkansas, in Pike County, Arkansas
- Saline Township, Sevier County, Arkansas, in Sevier County, Arkansas

== Illinois ==
- Saline Township, Madison County, Illinois

== Michigan ==
- Saline Township, Washtenaw County, Michigan

== Missouri ==
- Saline Township, Cooper County, Missouri
- Saline Township, Miller County, Missouri
- Saline Township, Perry County, Missouri
- Saline Township, Ralls County, Missouri
- Saline Township, Ste. Genevieve County, Missouri

== North Dakota ==
- Saline Township, McHenry County, North Dakota, in McHenry County, North Dakota

== Ohio ==
- Saline Township, Jefferson County, Ohio
