= Méallet =

Commune in Auvergne-Rhône-Alpes, France

- Commune
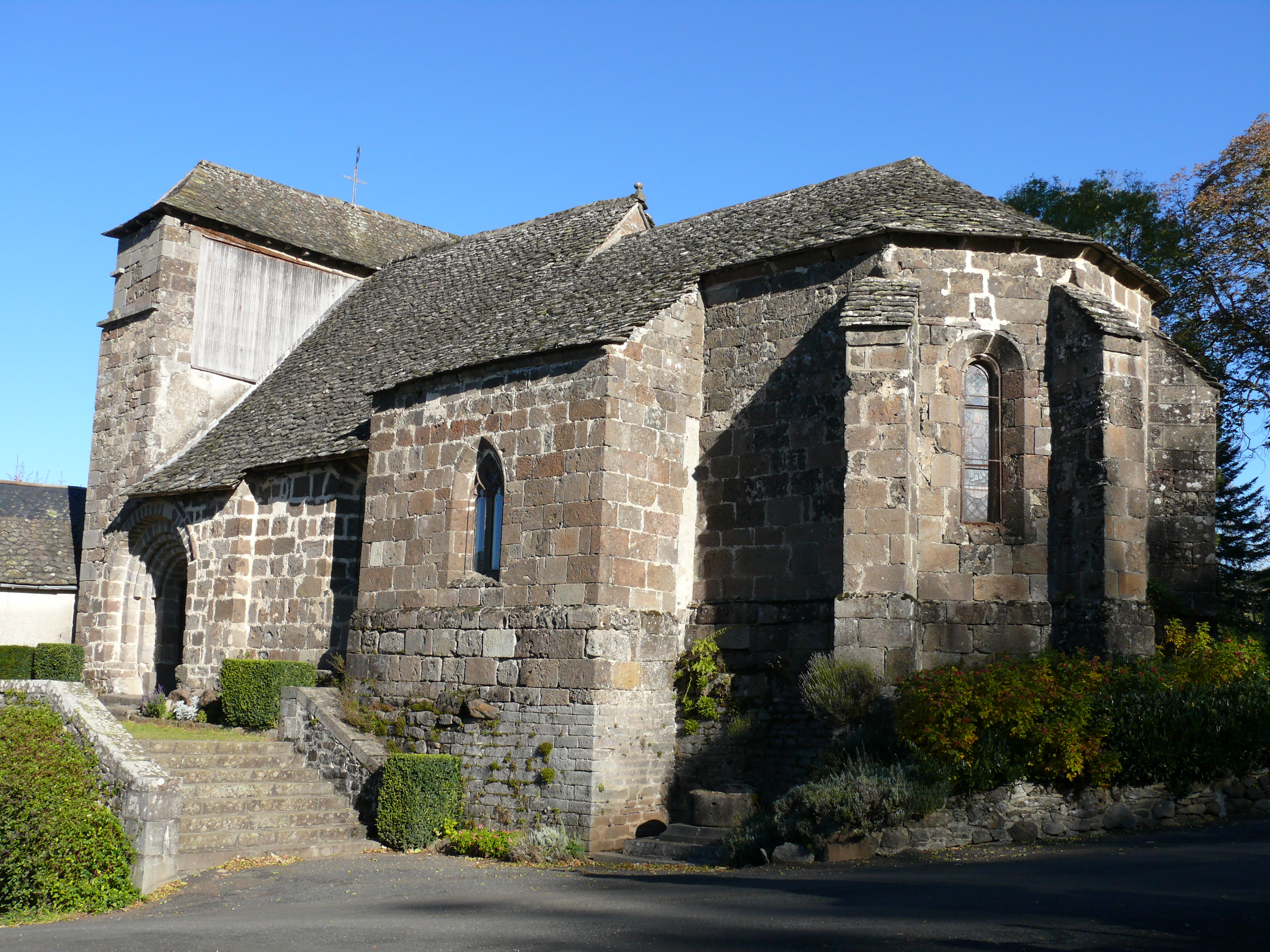
- The church of Saint-Georges, in Méallet
- Location of Méallet
- Location within France Location within Auvergne-Rhône-Alpes
- Coordinates: 45°15′21″N 2°25′52″E
- Country: France
- Region: Auvergne-Rhône-Alpes
- Department: Cantal
- Arrondissement: Mauriac
- Canton: Riom-ès-Montagnes
- Intercommunality: Pays de Mauriac

Government
  - Mayor (2020–2026): Roger Ribaud
- Area^{1}: 21.52 km^{2} (8.31 sq mi)
- Elevation: 700 m (2,300 ft)
- Highest elevation: 828 m (2,717 ft)
- Lowest elevation: 368 m (1,207 ft)
- Population (2023): 153
  - Density: 7.11/km^{2} (18.4/sq mi)
- Time zone: UTC+01:00 (CET)
  - Summer (DST): UTC+02:00 (CEST)
- INSEE/Postal code: 15123 /15200
- ^{1} French Land Register data, which excludes lakes, ponds, glaciers > 1 km^{2} (0.386 sq mi or 247 acres) and river estuaries.

Méallet (French pronunciation: [mealɛ]; Occitan: Mialet) is a commune in the Cantal department in south-central France.

== Population ==
Historical population
Year	Pop.	±% p.a.
1968	379	—
1975	304	−3.10%
1982	248	−2.87%
1990	185	−3.60%
1999	173	−0.74%
2007	176	+0.22%
2012	166	−1.16%
2017	170	+0.48%
2023	153	−1.74%
Source: INSEE

== See also ==
- Communes of the Cantal department
