= Pleaux =

Commune in Auvergne-Rhône-Alpes, France

- Commune
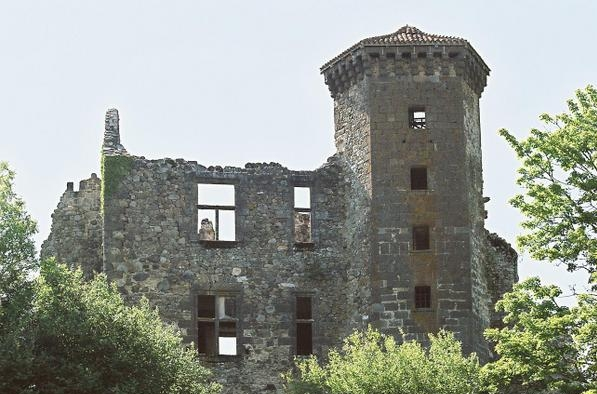
- Ruins of the chateau of Branzac

- Coat of arms
- Location of Pleaux
- Location within France Location within Auvergne-Rhône-Alpes
- Coordinates: 45°08′08″N 2°13′38″E
- Country: France
- Region: Auvergne-Rhône-Alpes
- Department: Cantal
- Arrondissement: Mauriac
- Canton: Mauriac
- Intercommunality: Pays de Salers

Government
  - Mayor (2020–2026): David Peyral
- Area^{1}: 92.39 km^{2} (35.67 sq mi)
- Elevation: 640 m (2,100 ft)
- Highest elevation: 765 m (2,510 ft)
- Lowest elevation: 264 m (866 ft)
- Population (2023): 1,470
  - Density: 15.9/km^{2} (41.2/sq mi)
- Time zone: UTC+01:00 (CET)
  - Summer (DST): UTC+02:00 (CEST)
- INSEE/Postal code: 15153 /15700
- ^{1} French Land Register data, which excludes lakes, ponds, glaciers > 1 km^{2} (0.386 sq mi or 247 acres) and river estuaries.

Pleaux (French pronunciation: [plo]; Auvergnat: Pleus) is a commune in the Cantal department in south-central France.

== Geography ==
The Maronne river forms the commune's southern border, with the Enchanet reservoir.

== Population ==
Historical population
Year	Pop.	±% p.a.
1968	2,721	—
1975	2,531	−1.03%
1982	2,328	−1.19%
1990	2,146	−1.01%
1999	1,823	−1.80%
2007	1,645	−1.28%
2012	1,549	−1.20%
2017	1,489	−0.79%
2023	1,470	−0.21%
Source: INSEE

== Sights ==
- Château de Branzac, 15th century ruined castle
- The Enchanet dam on the Maronne is on the border with the commune of Arnac

== See also ==
- Communes of the Cantal department
