= Drugeac =

Commune in Auvergne-Rhône-Alpes, France

- Commune
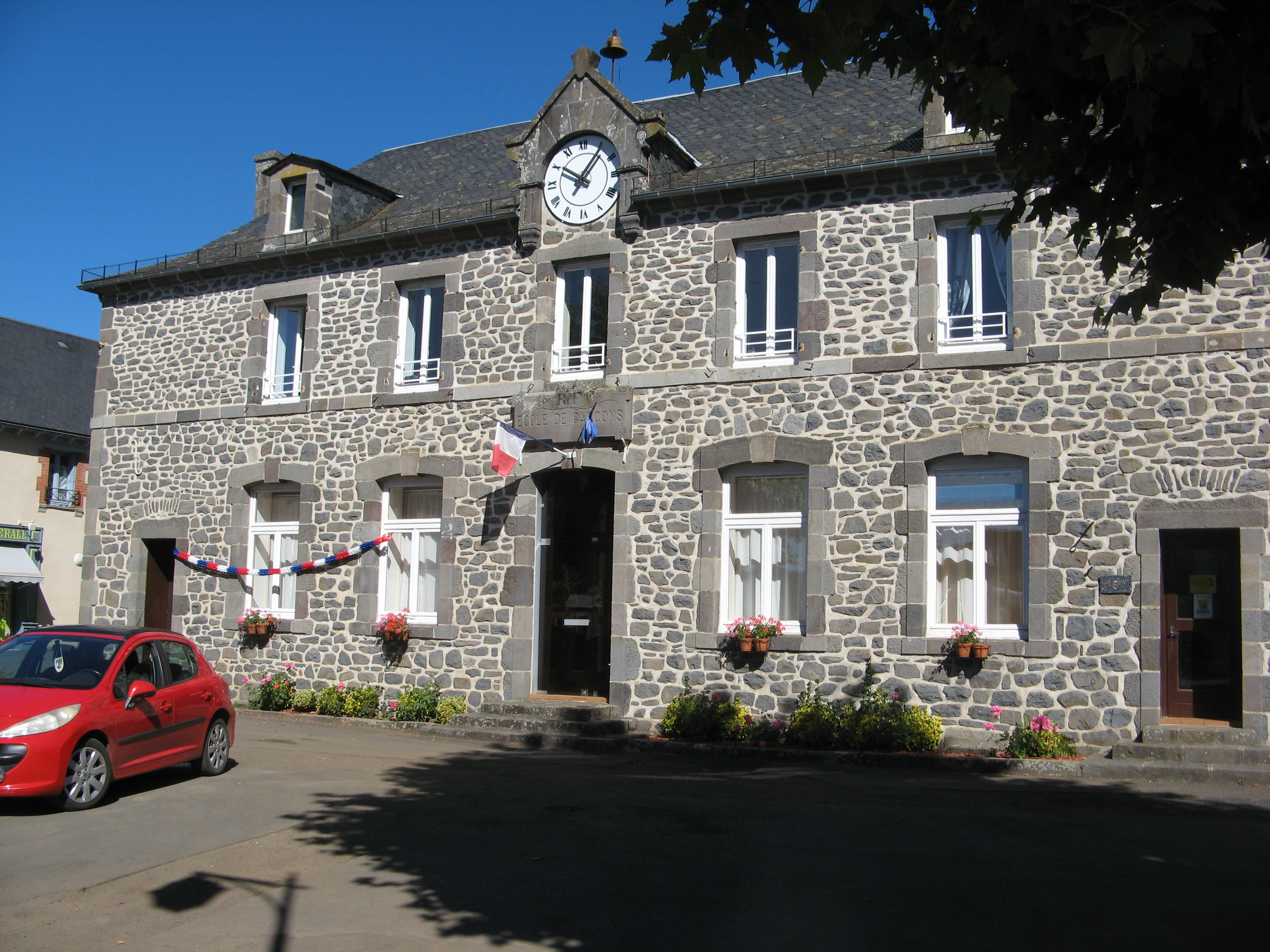
- Town hall
- Location of Drugeac
- Location within France Location within Auvergne-Rhône-Alpes
- Coordinates: 45°10′03″N 2°23′13″E
- Country: France
- Region: Auvergne-Rhône-Alpes
- Department: Cantal
- Arrondissement: Mauriac
- Canton: Mauriac
- Intercommunality: Pays de Mauriac

Government
  - Mayor (2020–2026): Marie-Hélène Chastre
- Area^{1}: 18.24 km^{2} (7.04 sq mi)
- Elevation: 693 m (2,274 ft)
- Highest elevation: 817 m (2,680 ft)
- Lowest elevation: 537 m (1,762 ft)
- Population (2023): 321
  - Density: 17.6/km^{2} (45.6/sq mi)
- Time zone: UTC+01:00 (CET)
  - Summer (DST): UTC+02:00 (CEST)
- INSEE/Postal code: 15063 /15140
- ^{1} French Land Register data, which excludes lakes, ponds, glaciers > 1 km^{2} (0.386 sq mi or 247 acres) and river estuaries.

Drugeac (French pronunciation: [dʁyʒak]; Occitan: Drujac) is a commune in the Cantal department in south-central France.

== Population ==
Historical population
Year	Pop.	±% p.a.
1968	678	—
1975	571	−2.42%
1982	542	−0.74%
1990	471	−1.74%
1999	367	−2.73%
2007	376	+0.30%
2012	354	−1.20%
2017	349	−0.28%
2023	321	−1.38%
Source: INSEE

== See also ==
- Communes of the Cantal department
