= Chalvignac =

Commune in Auvergne-Rhône-Alpes, France

- Commune
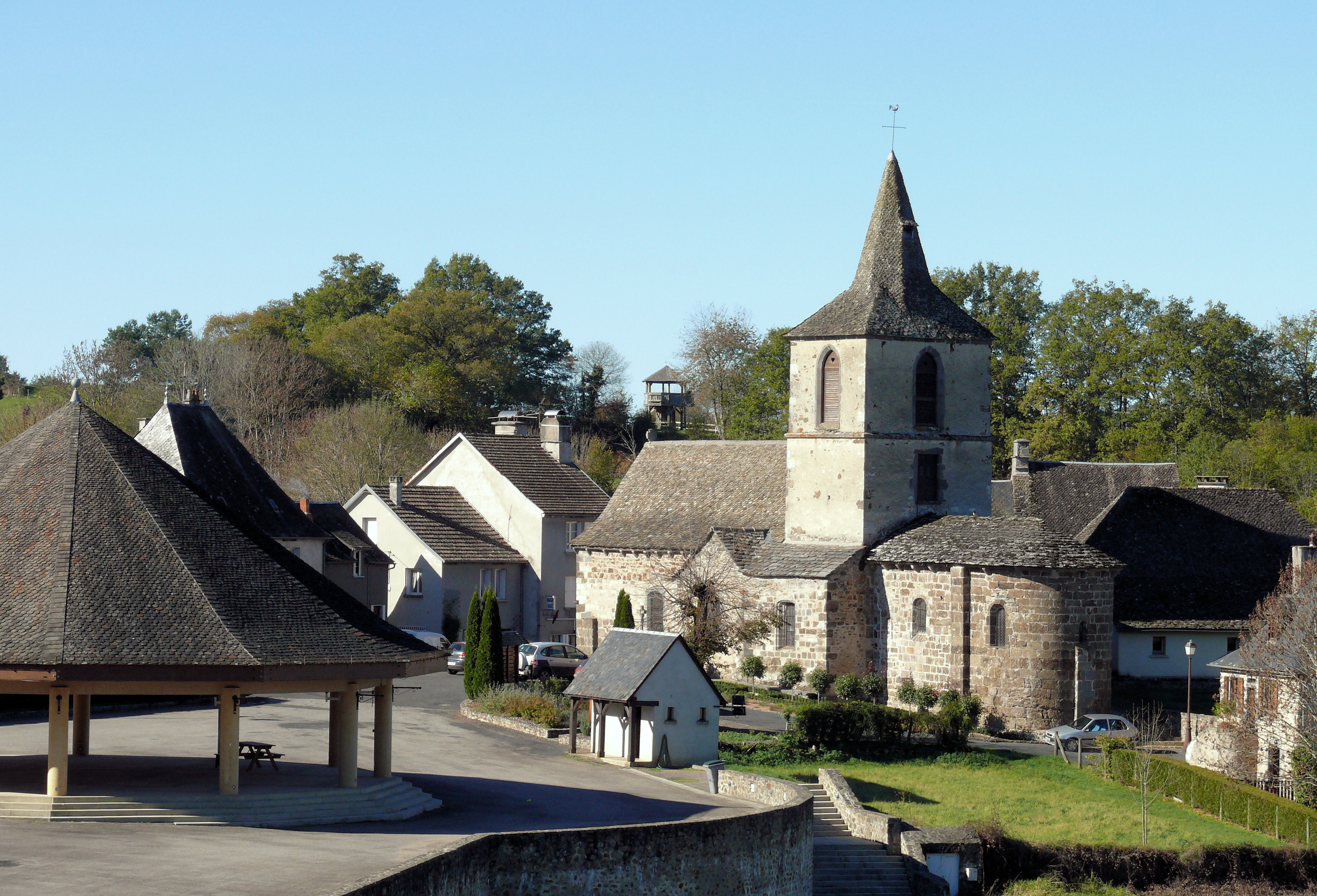
- The church square in Chalvignac
- Location of Chalvignac
- Location within France Location within Auvergne-Rhône-Alpes
- Coordinates: 45°14′28″N 2°14′48″E
- Country: France
- Region: Auvergne-Rhône-Alpes
- Department: Cantal
- Arrondissement: Mauriac
- Canton: Mauriac

Government
  - Mayor (2020–2026): Serge Leymonie
- Area^{1}: 35.89 km^{2} (13.86 sq mi)
- Elevation: 375 m (1,230 ft)
- Highest elevation: 692 m (2,270 ft)
- Lowest elevation: 259 m (850 ft)
- Population (2023): 450
  - Density: 13/km^{2} (32/sq mi)
- Time zone: UTC+01:00 (CET)
  - Summer (DST): UTC+02:00 (CEST)
- INSEE/Postal code: 15036 /15200
- ^{1} French Land Register data, which excludes lakes, ponds, glaciers > 1 km^{2} (0.386 sq mi or 247 acres) and river estuaries.

Chalvignac (French pronunciation: [ʃalviɲak]; Occitan: Chalvinhac) is a commune in the Cantal department in south-central France.

== Population ==
Historical population
Year	Pop.	±% p.a.
1968	818	—
1975	610	−4.10%
1982	580	−0.72%
1990	525	−1.24%
1999	497	−0.61%
2007	422	−2.02%
2012	446	+1.11%
2017	469	+1.01%
2023	450	−0.69%
Source: INSEE

== See also ==
- Communes of the Cantal department
