= Salinas River =

Salinas River may refer to:

- Salinas River (California), US
  - Salinas River National Wildlife Refuge
  - Salinas River State Beach
- Salinas River (Guam)
- Salinas River (Guatemala)
- Salinas River (Mexico)
- Salinas River (Minas Gerais), Brazil
