= Le Falgoux =

Commune in Auvergne-Rhône-Alpes, France

- Commune
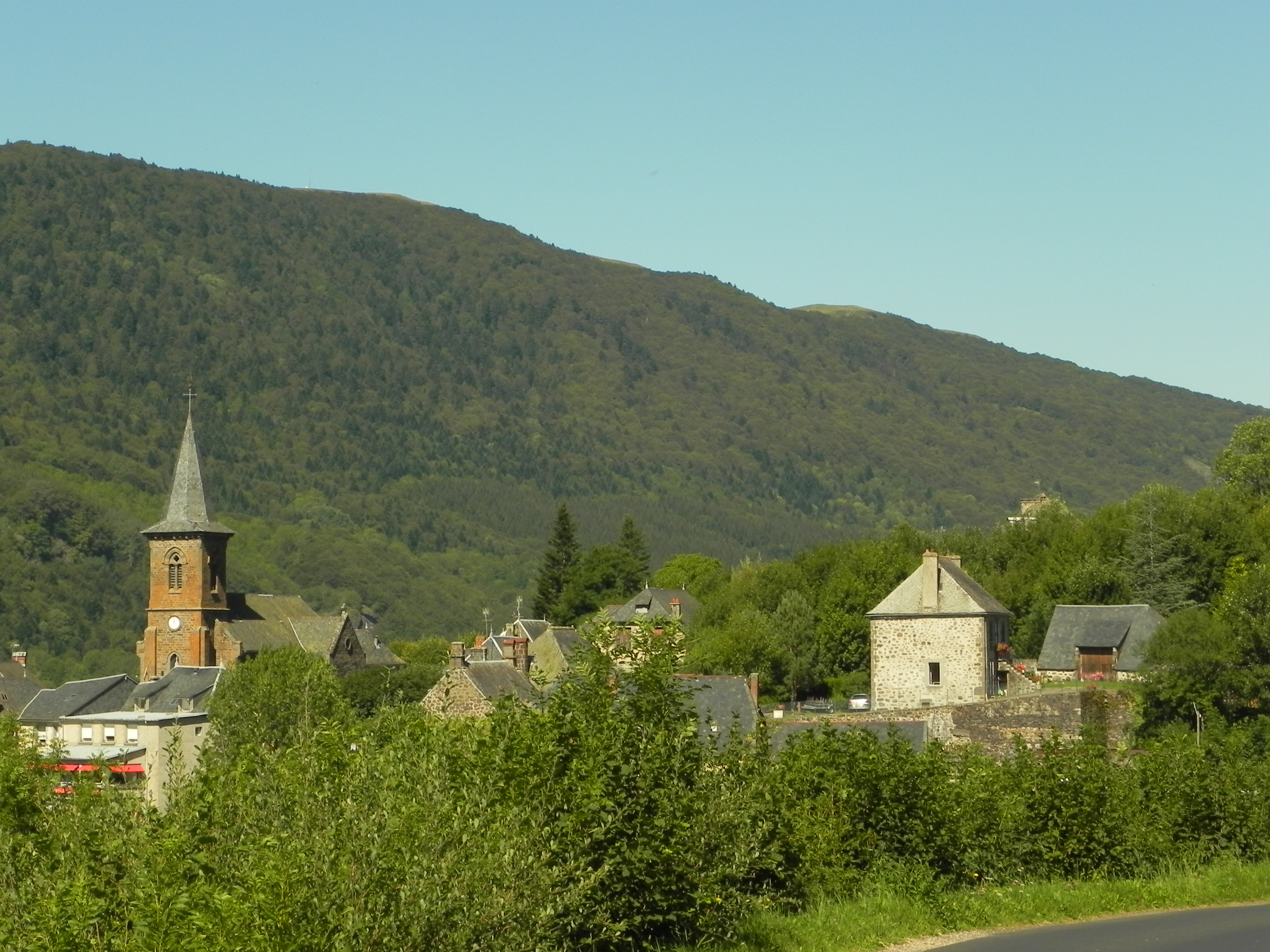
- Le Falgoux at the foot of the Puy Mary, in the heart of the Auvergne volcano park
- Location of Le Falgoux
- Location within France Location within Auvergne-Rhône-Alpes
- Coordinates: 45°09′22″N 2°37′24″E
- Country: France
- Region: Auvergne-Rhône-Alpes
- Department: Cantal
- Arrondissement: Mauriac
- Canton: Riom-ès-Montagnes
- Intercommunality: Pays de Salers

Government
  - Mayor (2020–2026): Louis Chambon
- Area^{1}: 30.59 km^{2} (11.81 sq mi)
- Elevation: 930 m (3,050 ft)
- Highest elevation: 1,780 m (5,840 ft)
- Lowest elevation: 813 m (2,667 ft)
- Population (2023): 113
  - Density: 3.69/km^{2} (9.57/sq mi)
- Time zone: UTC+01:00 (CET)
  - Summer (DST): UTC+02:00 (CEST)
- INSEE/Postal code: 15066 /15380
- ^{1} French Land Register data, which excludes lakes, ponds, glaciers > 1 km^{2} (0.386 sq mi or 247 acres) and river estuaries.

Le Falgoux (French pronunciation: [lə falɡu]; Occitan: Lo Faugós) is a commune in the Cantal department in south-central France.

== Population ==
Historical population
| Year | Pop. | ±% p.a. |
|---|---|---|
| 1968 | 418 | — |
| 1975 | 350 | −2.50% |
| 1982 | 292 | −2.56% |
| 1990 | 226 | −3.15% |
| 1999 | 193 | −1.74% |
| 2007 | 155 | −2.70% |
| 2012 | 135 | −2.73% |
| 2017 | 120 | −2.33% |
| 2023 | 113 | −1.00% |
Source: INSEE

== See also ==
- Communes of the Cantal department
