= Escorailles =

Commune in Auvergne-Rhône-Alpes, France

- Commune
- Location of Escorailles
- Location within France Location within Auvergne-Rhône-Alpes
- Coordinates: 45°10′27″N 2°19′51″E
- Country: France
- Region: Auvergne-Rhône-Alpes
- Department: Cantal
- Arrondissement: Mauriac
- Canton: Mauriac
- Intercommunality: Pays de Salers

Government
  - Mayor (2023–2026): Jean-Pierre Labastrou
- Area^{1}: 2.79 km^{2} (1.08 sq mi)
- Elevation: 715 m (2,346 ft)
- Highest elevation: 805 m (2,641 ft)
- Lowest elevation: 518 m (1,699 ft)
- Population (2023): 82
  - Density: 29/km^{2} (76/sq mi)
- Time zone: UTC+01:00 (CET)
  - Summer (DST): UTC+02:00 (CEST)
- INSEE/Postal code: 15064 /15700
- ^{1} French Land Register data, which excludes lakes, ponds, glaciers > 1 km^{2} (0.386 sq mi or 247 acres) and river estuaries.

Escorailles (French pronunciation: [ɛskɔʁaj]; Occitan: Escoralha) is a commune in the département of Cantal in south-central France.

== Population ==
Historical population
Year	Pop.	±% p.a.
1968	100	—
1975	99	−0.14%
1982	98	−0.14%
1990	83	−2.06%
1999	78	−0.69%
2007	71	−1.17%
2012	74	+0.83%
2017	79	+1.32%
2023	82	+0.62%
Source: INSEE

== See also ==
- Communes of the Cantal department
