= Cantal's 2nd constituency =

Constituency of the National Assembly of France

2nd constituency of Cantal
- inline Constituency of the National Assembly of France

- The two constituencies of Cantal

- Cantal in France
- Deputy: Jean-Yves Bony; LR
- Department: Cantal
- Cantons: Allanche, Champs-sur-Tarentaine-Marchal, Chaudes-Aigues, Condat, Massiac, Mauriac, Murat, Pierrefort, Pleaux, Riom-ès-Montagnes, Ruynes-en-Margeride, Saignes, Saint-Flour-Nord, Saint-Flour-Sud, Salers.

The 2nd constituency of Cantal is a French legislative constituency in the Cantal département. It is currently represented by Jean-Yves Bony of The Republicans (LR).

It was formerly the electoral base of the 2nd President of the Fifth French Republic, Georges Pompidou, (1969–74).

== Historic representation ==
Election	Member	Party
1988	Pierre Raynal	RPR
1993	Alain Marleix	RPR
2002	Alain Marleix	UMP
2017	Jean-Yves Bony	LR
2022	Jean-Yves Bony	LR
2024	Jean-Yves Bony	LR

== Election results ==
=== 2024 ===
Candidate	Party	Alliance	First round			Second round		
Candidate	Party	Alliance	Votes	%	+/–	Votes	%	+/–
Jean-Yves Bony	LR	UDC	12,383	34.29	-3.42	21,585	60.71	-9.94
Gilles Lacroix	RN		11,923	33.02	+19.12	13,967	39.29	new
Zoé Pébay	LFI	NFP	4,919	13.62	-2.71			
Louis Toty	DVD		3,348	9.27	-1.41			
Vladimir Tilmant-Tatischeff	MoDem	ENS	3,019	8.36	-9.10			
Mona Cheikhi	LO		298	0.83	-0.20			
Pascal Veysset-Rapaport	REC		220	0.61	-2.26			
Votes			36,110	100.00		35,552	100.00	
Valid votes			36,110	97.39	-0.33	35,552	95.41	+6.90
Blank votes			592	1.60	-0.01	1,204	3.23	-5.03
Null votes			376	1.01	+0.33	506	1.36	-1.87
Turnout			37,078	70.88	+17.12	37,262	71.24	+24.52
Abstentions			15,232	29.12	-17.12	15,045	28.76	-24.52
Registered voters			52,310			52,307		
Result			LR HOLD					

=== 2022 ===
Legislative Election 2022: Cantal's 2nd constituency
Party	Candidate	Votes	%	±%
LR (UDC)	Jean-Yves Bony	10,472	37.71	+5.76
MoDem (Ensemble)	Martine Guibert	4,848	17.46	-6.14
LFI (NUPÉS)	Mélody Morille	4,534	16.33	+2.46
RN	Gilles Lacroix	3,861	13.90	+7.89
DVD	Louis Toty	2,967	10.68	N/A
REC	Antoine Cheyrol	796	2.87	N/A
LO	Mona Cheikhi	285	1.03	+0.47
DVE	Jean-René Delmoure	7	0.03	N/A
Turnout		27,770	53.76	−1.53
2nd round result
LR (UDC)	Jean-Yves Bony	15,443	70.65	+14.89
MoDem (Ensemble)	Martine Guibert	6,416	29.35	−14.89
Turnout		21,859	46.72	−4.97
LR hold		Swing	+14.89	

=== 2017 ===
Candidate	Label	First round		Second round	
Candidate	Label	Votes	%	Votes	%
Jean-Yves Bony	LR	9,381	31.95	14,501	55.76
Patricia Roches	REM	6,929	23.60	11,504	44.24
Pierre Jarlier	DVD	6,190	21.08		
François Boisset	PCF	1,998	6.80		
Gilles Lacroix	FN	1,766	6.01		
Marc Petitjean	PS	1,258	4.28		
Élise Brugière	ECO	818	2.79		
Jérôme Dumas	DLF	351	1.20		
Emmanuel Maillard	DIV	322	1.10		
Anne Ducamp	EXG	164	0.56		
Philippe Rousset	EXD	100	0.34		
Bernadette Pierry	DIV	87	0.30		
Votes		29,364	100.00	26,005	100.00
Valid votes		29,364	97.80	26,005	92.67
Blank votes		436	1.45	1,356	4.83
Null votes		225	0.75	700	2.49
Turnout		30,025	55.29	28,061	51.69
Abstentions		24,278	44.71	26,229	48.31
Registered voters		54,303		54,290	
Source: Ministry of the Interior

=== 2012 ===
Results of the 10 June and 17 June 2007 French legislative election in Bouches-du-Rhône’s 2nd Constituency
Party	Candidate	Votes	%	±%
UMP	Alain Marleix	17,688	50.24	
PS	Gérard Salat	12,626	35.86	
FN	Pauline Guibert	2,062	5.86	
FG	Henri Coetmeur	707	2.01	
DVD	Jean-Claude Walchli	587	1.67	
Centrist	Vladimir Tilmant-Tatischeff	570	1.62	
EELV	Dominique Dumazel	551	1.57	
DVD	Gisèle Argaillot-Ivanov	167	0.47	
DVE	Claude Lo Verde	133	0.38	
Far left	Anne Ducamp	115	0.33	
DVD	Véronique Rolland	0	0.00	
Majority		5,062	14.38	
Turnout		35,703	63.28	
UMP hold		Swing		

=== 2007 ===
Legislative Election 2007: Cantal 2nd - single round
Party	Candidate	Votes	%	±%
UMP	Alain Marleix	23,438	63.72	
PS	Marie-Thérèse Salles	5,404	14.69	
MRC	Marc Petitjean	3,578	9.73	
MoDem	Jean-Pierre Lagane	1,866	5.07	
LV	Dominique Dumazel	713	1.94	
PCF	Liliane Fuchey	602	1.64	
MEI	Michel Fabre	525	1.43	
LO	Muriel Monchal	407	1.11	
Workers' Party	Jocelyne Vasseur-Delmas	206	0.56	
Independent	Pierre Morin	43	0.12	
MPF	Odile Jalenques	0	0	
Turnout		41,605	64.24	
UMP hold		Swing		

=== 2002 ===
Legislative Election 2002: Cantal's 2nd constituency
Party	Candidate	Votes	%	±%
UMP	Alain Marleix	22,249	55.96	
PS	Nicole Goueffic-Collange	5,805	14.60	
DVD	Louis Galtier	4,783	12.03	
DVG	Marc Petitjean	2,454	6.17	
FN	Colette Gadiot	1,465	3.68	
PCF	Marinette Audrerie	921	2.32	
EXD	Christian Odwa	854	2.15	
Others	N/A	1,230		
Turnout		40,453	67.60	
UMP hold				

=== 1997 ===
Legislative Election 1997: Cantal's 2nd constituency
Party	Candidate	Votes	%	±%
RPR	Alain Marleix	22,115	55.79	
PRG	Marc Petitjean	9,912	25.01	
PCF	Marinette Audrerie	3,100	7.82	
FN	Alice Brugue	2,788	7.03	
MPF	Jean-Pierre Marchand	1,361	3.43	
DIV	Pascal Contejean	362	0.91	
Turnout		42,187	69.63	
RPR hold				

== Sources ==
- French Interior Ministry results website: "Résultats électoraux officiels en France" (in French).
