= Grande Saline =

Grande Saline may refer to:

- Grande Saline, Haiti
- Grande Saline, Saint Barthélemy

== See also ==
- Grand Saline, Texas
