= Salins, Cantal =

Commune in Auvergne-Rhône-Alpes, France

Salins
- Commune
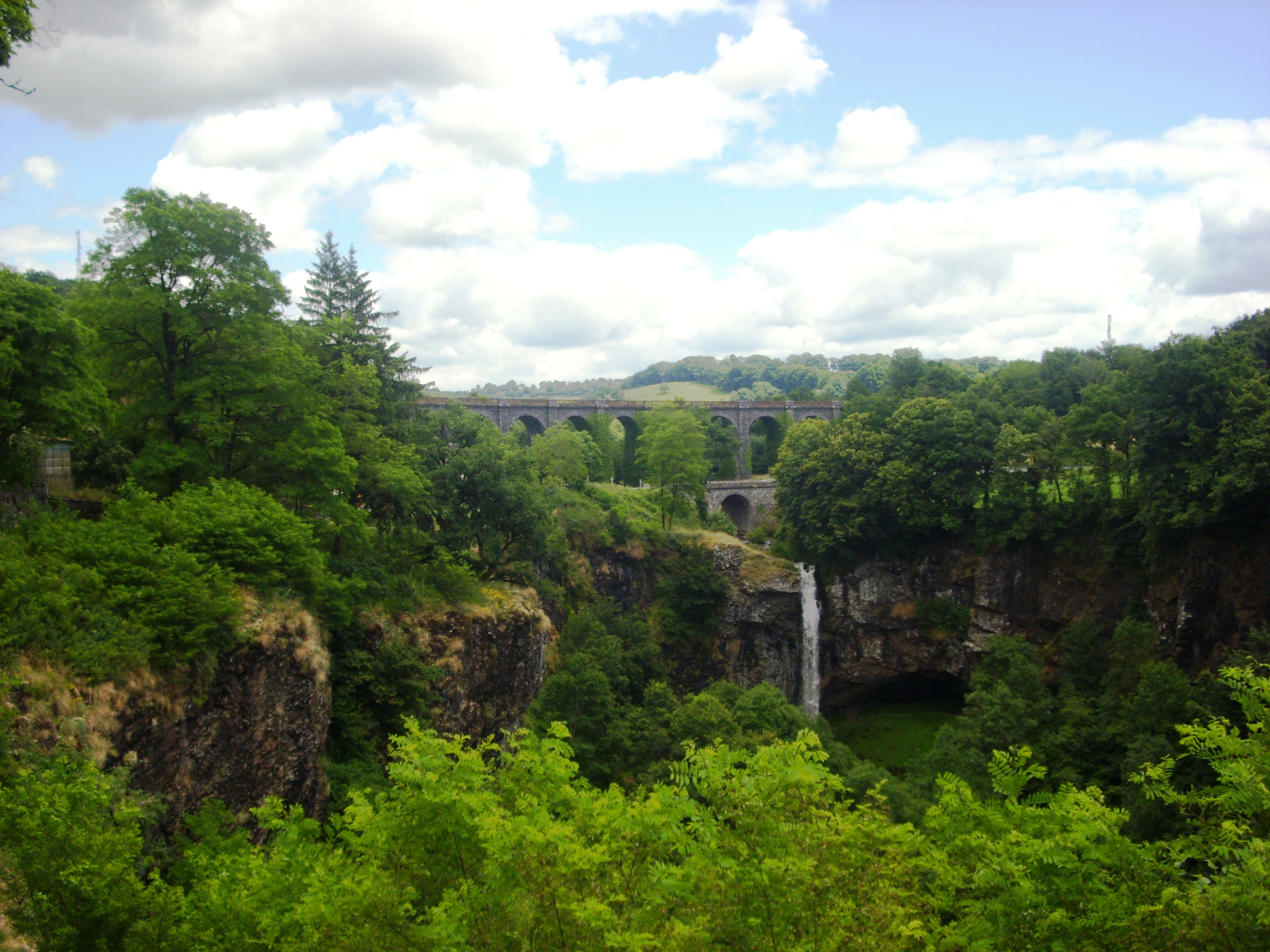
- Auze waterfall
- Location of Salins
- Location within France Location within Auvergne-Rhône-Alpes
- Coordinates: 45°11′30″N 2°23′38″E
- Country: France
- Region: Auvergne-Rhône-Alpes
- Department: Cantal
- Arrondissement: Mauriac
- Canton: Mauriac
- Intercommunality: Pays de Mauriac

Government
  - Mayor (2020–2026): Michel Laporte
- Area^{1}: 8.75 km^{2} (3.38 sq mi)
- Elevation: 710 m (2,330 ft)
- Highest elevation: 821 m (2,694 ft)
- Lowest elevation: 573 m (1,880 ft)
- Population (2023): 145
  - Density: 16.6/km^{2} (42.9/sq mi)
- Time zone: UTC+01:00 (CET)
  - Summer (DST): UTC+02:00 (CEST)
- INSEE/Postal code: 15220 /15200
- ^{1} French Land Register data, which excludes lakes, ponds, glaciers > 1 km^{2} (0.386 sq mi or 247 acres) and river estuaries.

Salins (Occitan: Salinas) is a commune in the Cantal department in south-central France.

== Population ==
Historical population
Year	Pop.	±% p.a.
1968	215	—
1975	173	−3.06%
1982	159	−1.20%
1990	164	+0.39%
1999	153	−0.77%
2007	161	+0.64%
2012	148	−1.67%
2017	147	−0.14%
2023	145	−0.23%
Source: INSEE

== See also ==
- Communes of the Cantal department
