= Saline Creek =

Saline Creek may refer to:

- Saline Creek (Cedar Creek), a stream in Missouri
- Saline Creek (Mississippi River), a stream in Missouri
- Saline Creek (Osage River), a stream in Missouri
