= Salin (surname) =

Salin is the surname of the following people:

- Ari Salin (1947–2026), Finnish hurdler and sprinter
- Bernhard Salin (1861–1931), Swedish archaeologist, cultural historian and museum curator
- Edgar Salin (1892–1974), German economist
- Holger Salin (1911 – c. 1943/1944), Finnish footballer
- Kari Salin (born 1967), better known as Kari Wührer, American actress and singer
- Pascal Salin (born 1939), French economist, university professor
- Phil Salin (1950–1991), American economist and futurist
- Riitta Salin (born 1950), Finnish sprinter
- Romain Salin (born 1984), French football (soccer) player
- Sasu Salin (born 1991), Finnish basketball player
