= Salers =

Commune in Auvergne-Rhône-Alpes, France

Salers Salèrn (Occitan)
- Commune
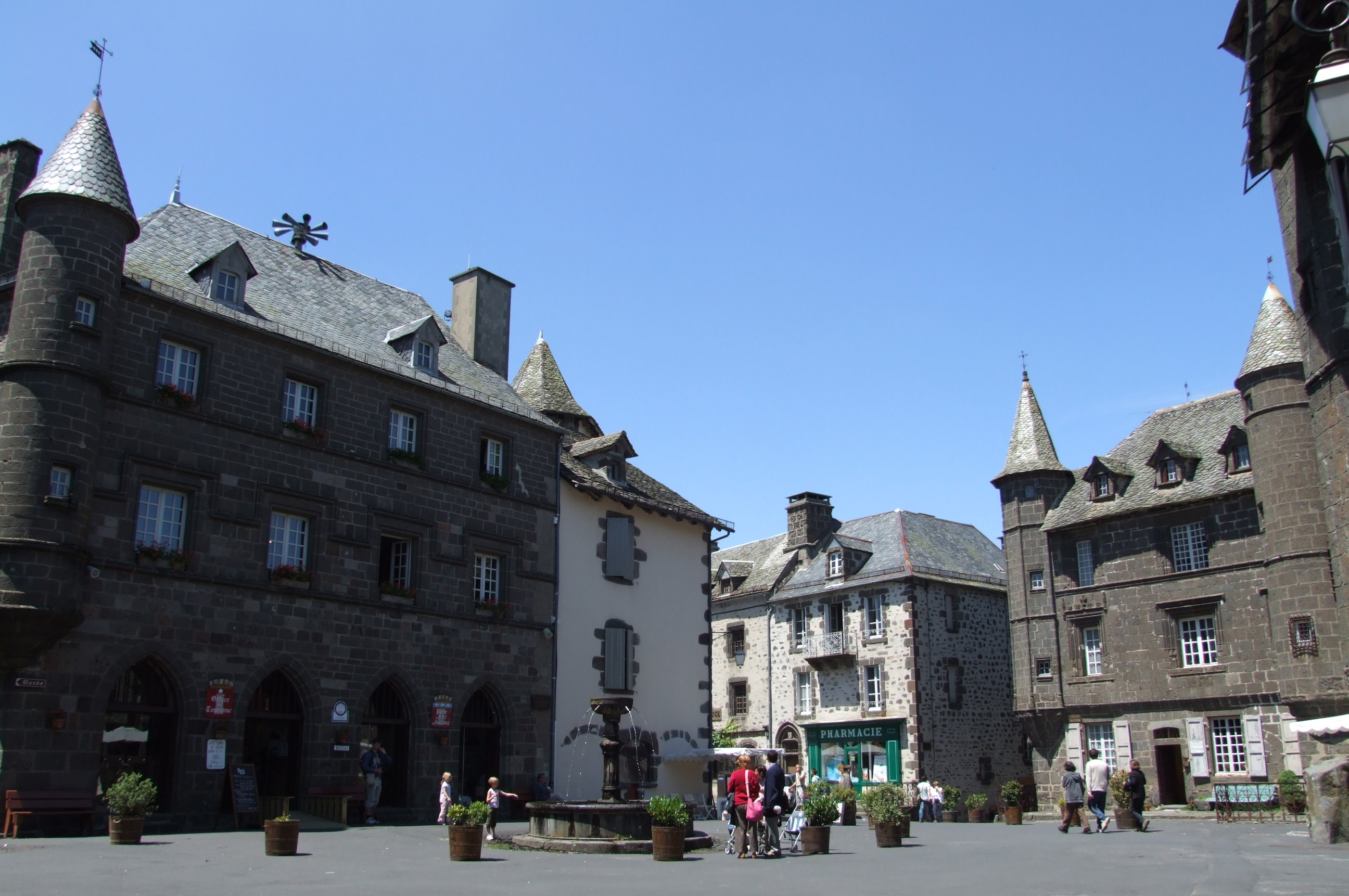
- The town hall in Salers

- Coat of arms
- Location of Salers
- Location within France Location within Auvergne-Rhône-Alpes
- Coordinates: 45°08′20″N 2°29′42″E
- Country: France
- Region: Auvergne-Rhône-Alpes
- Department: Cantal
- Arrondissement: Mauriac
- Canton: Mauriac
- Intercommunality: Pays de Salers

Government
  - Mayor (2020–2026): Jean-Louis Faure
- Area^{1}: 4.85 km^{2} (1.87 sq mi)
- Elevation: 951 m (3,120 ft)
- Highest elevation: 1,207 m (3,960 ft)
- Lowest elevation: 830 m (2,720 ft)
- Population (2023): 310
  - Density: 64/km^{2} (170/sq mi)
- Time zone: UTC+01:00 (CET)
  - Summer (DST): UTC+02:00 (CEST)
- INSEE/Postal code: 15219 /15140
- ^{1} French Land Register data, which excludes lakes, ponds, glaciers > 1 km^{2} (0.386 sq mi or 247 acres) and river estuaries.

Salers (French pronunciation: [saˈlɛʁ]; Occitan: Salèrn) is a commune in the Cantal department in south-central France. It is a member of Les Plus Beaux Villages de France (The Most Beautiful Villages of France) Association.

It is famous for the Appellation d'Origine Contrôlée (AOC) cheeses Cantal and Salers. It is also famous for the Salers breed of cattle that originated in this commune.

It was pillaged by Rodrigo de Villandrando in the late 1430s, during the final phase of the Hundred Years' War.

== Population ==
Historical population
Year	Pop.	±% p.a.
1968	521	—
1975	480	−1.16%
1982	451	−0.89%
1990	439	−0.34%
1999	401	−1.00%
2007	364	−1.20%
2012	345	−1.07%
2017	329	−0.95%
2023	310	−0.99%
Source: INSEE

== See also ==
- Communes of the Cantal department
