= Bassignac =

Commune in Auvergne-Rhône-Alpes, France

- Commune
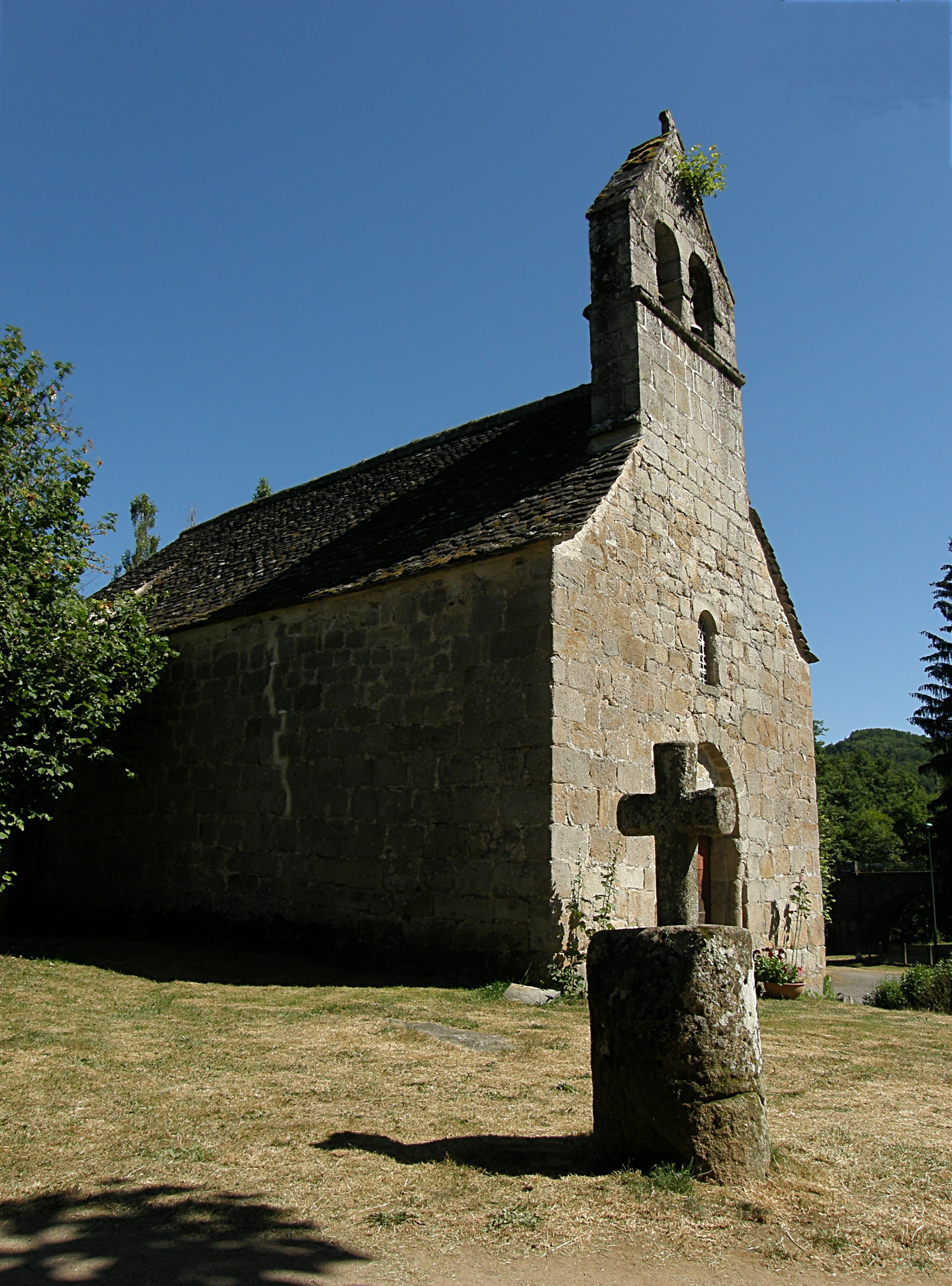
- The Romanesque chapel of Saint-Jacques, in the hamlet of Vendes, in Bassignac
- Location of Bassignac
- Location within France Location within Auvergne-Rhône-Alpes
- Coordinates: 45°19′18″N 2°24′24″E
- Country: France
- Region: Auvergne-Rhône-Alpes
- Department: Cantal
- Arrondissement: Mauriac
- Canton: Ydes
- Intercommunality: Sumène Artense

Government
  - Mayor (2020–2026): Marc Maisonneuve
- Area^{1}: 11.95 km^{2} (4.61 sq mi)
- Elevation: 412 m (1,352 ft)
- Highest elevation: 671 m (2,201 ft)
- Lowest elevation: 359 m (1,178 ft)
- Population (2023): 223
  - Density: 18.7/km^{2} (48.3/sq mi)
- Time zone: UTC+01:00 (CET)
  - Summer (DST): UTC+02:00 (CEST)
- INSEE/Postal code: 15019 /15240
- ^{1} French Land Register data, which excludes lakes, ponds, glaciers > 1 km^{2} (0.386 sq mi or 247 acres) and river estuaries.

Bassignac (French pronunciation: [basiɲak]; Occitan: Bassinhac) is a commune in the Cantal department in the Auvergne region of south-central France.

== Geography ==
Bassignac is located some 35 km north-east of Tulle and 10 km south by south-west of Bort-les-Orgues. Access to the commune is by the D922 road from Ydes in the north which passes through the length of the commune and the village and continues south to Mauriac. The D12 comes from Veyrières in the west and goes down the western border joining the D922 at Vendes. The D512 branches off the D12 and passes through Parensol continuing north to join the D922 south of Ydes. Apart from the village there are the hamlets of Le Fau, Le Marlat, Parensol, Montgroux, Vendes, Brousse, and Champleix. The commune is mixed forest and farmland.

Vendes is the largest village in the commune with 60 inhabitants in winter and about 100 in summer and is dominated by the old Sumène viaduct.

The Sumène river flows through the commune from north to south turning west to form the southern border of the commune and continuing west to join the Dordogne north of Arches. The Ruisseau de la Graille rises in the centre of the commune and flows north then south to join the Sumène. The Ruisseau de Rouillade flows south forming the eastern border of the commune before joining the Sumène near the centre of the commune.

== History ==
In the 10th century the hamlet of Vendes was the property of Artaud de Charlus. Charlus was a promontory some 4 km north of Vendes and had a fortified chateau on top. There are no remains except a view across the mountains of Auvergne. The Lévis-Charlus family was a noble family.

Bassignac appears as Baßignac on the 1750 Cassini Map and as Bassignac on the 1790 version.

There was a railway running through the commune with the second longest viaduct in Cantal at 367m and a height of 46m. The viaduct and railway were opened in 1893 as part of the SNCF line from Paris-Austerlitz-Aurillac. The line closed on 3 July 1994 and the viaduct was abandoned.

== Administration ==
List of Successive Mayors

From	To	Name	Party
2001	2026	Marc Maisonneuve	PS

== Demography ==
Historical population

Year	Pop.	±% p.a.
1793	539	—
1800	545	+0.16%
1806	570	+0.75%
1821	520	−0.61%
1831	585	+1.18%
1836	535	−1.77%
1841	512	−0.87%
1846	600	+3.22%
1851	587	−0.44%
1856	584	−0.10%
1861	515	−2.48%
1866	531	+0.61%
1872	455	−2.54%
1876	512	+2.99%
1881	508	−0.16%
1886	485	−0.92%
1891	1,260	+21.04%
1896	635	−12.81%
1901	636	+0.03%

Year	Pop.	±% p.a.
1906	639	+0.09%
1911	540	−3.31%
1921	567	+0.49%
1926	562	−0.18%
1931	637	+2.54%
1936	461	−6.26%
1946	524	+1.29%
1954	422	−2.67%
1962	358	−2.03%
1968	276	−4.24%
1975	223	−3.00%
1982	209	−0.92%
1990	208	−0.06%
1999	230	+1.12%
2007	226	−0.22%
2012	223	−0.27%
2017	231	+0.71%
2023	223	−0.59%

Source: EHESS and INSEE

=== Education ===
The commune has a public primary school at Vendes.

=== Associations ===
- Association 3V - The espavents, Vendes Viaduct Village: Association to safeguard the Sumène viaduct and the festival of scarecrows.

== Culture and heritage ==
=== Civil heritage ===
The commune has many buildings and sites that are registered as historical monuments:

- The Sumène Viaduct (1893) The interior decor of the Viaduct is also registered as an historical object.
- A Priory House (1746)
- The Chateau Park
- Coal Mining Industrial Buildings (19th century)
- Houses and Farms (17th-20th century)
- A Flour Mill at Vendes (1799)
- A City of Miners at Champleix (20th century)
- A Farmhouse at Lavaurs (1865)
- A Merchant's House at Lachamp (1868)
- A Farmhouse at Le Fau (1769)
- A Farmhouse at La Riagaire (1799)
- A Farmhouse at Montgroux (1830)
- A Farmhouse at Emprades (16th century)
- The Chateau du Rieu Farmhouse at Le Rieu (1755)
- A Road Bridge at Vendes (18th century)
- A Wheelwright and Blacksmith's House at Vendes (18th century)
- A House at Vendes (1746)
- A Chateau at Vendes (1780)
- A Chateau (15th century)

=== Religious heritage ===
The commune has several religious buildings and sites that are registered as historical monuments:

- The Church of Vendes (11th century)
- Monumental Crosses (19th-20th century)
- The Benedictine Priory of Saint Jacques (1778) The priory contains several items that are registered as historical objects:
  - The Furniture in the Priory
  - A Group Sculpture: Education of the Virgin (19th century)
  - A Statuette: Saint Marguerite of Antioch (19th century)
  - A Statuette: Saint Barbe (18th century)
  - 2 Statuettes: Saint Jacques and Saint Joseph (1855)
  - A Stoup (Middle Ages)
- The Parish Church of Sainte-Marie and Sainte-Radegonde (12th century) The Church contains many items that are registered as historical objects:
  - A Stained glass window: God the Father blessing (15th century)
  - A Stained glass window: Christ blessing (15th century)
  - An ex-voto Painting: The Crucifixion (1633)
  - 4 Capitals and 2 bases (12th century)
  - The Furniture in the Church
  - A Candle Mould (19th century)
  - A Chalice (18th century)
  - A Statue: Saint Radegonde of Poitiers (17th century)
  - A Painting: The Adoration of the citizens (19th century)
  - A Painting: Saint Radegonde of Poitiers (19th century)
  - A Painting: The Crucifixion (1633)
  - 2 Windows: Christ blessing and God the Father (16th century)

== See also ==
- Communes of the Cantal department
