= Lanobre =

Commune in Auvergne-Rhône-Alpes, France

- Commune
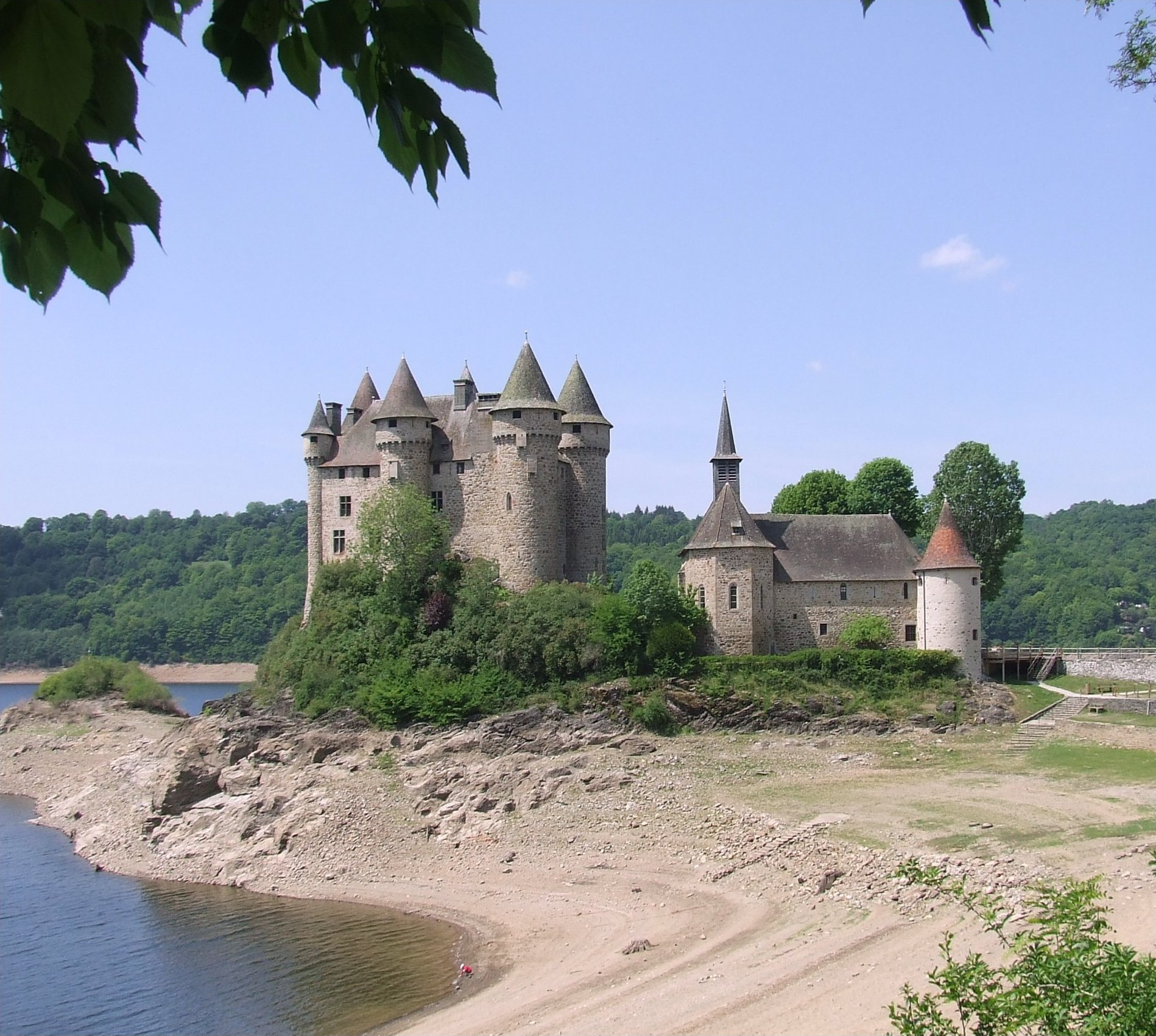
- Château de Val

- Coat of arms
- Location of Lanobre
- Location within France Location within Auvergne-Rhône-Alpes
- Coordinates: 45°26′23″N 2°32′06″E
- Country: France
- Region: Auvergne-Rhône-Alpes
- Department: Cantal
- Arrondissement: Mauriac
- Canton: Ydes

Government
  - Mayor (2020–2026): Pascal Lorenzo
- Area^{1}: 40.99 km^{2} (15.83 sq mi)
- Highest elevation: 896 m (2,940 ft)
- Lowest elevation: 430 m (1,410 ft)
- Population (2023): 1,351
  - Density: 32.96/km^{2} (85.36/sq mi)
- Time zone: UTC+01:00 (CET)
  - Summer (DST): UTC+02:00 (CEST)
- INSEE/Postal code: 15092 /15270
- ^{1} French Land Register data, which excludes lakes, ponds, glaciers > 1 km^{2} (0.386 sq mi or 247 acres) and river estuaries.

Lanobre (French pronunciation: [lanɔbʁ]; Occitan: Lanòbre) is a commune in the south-central French department of Cantal. A 13th-century castle, the Château de Val, is located in the commune.

== Population ==
Historical population
Year	Pop.	±% p.a.
1968	1,418	—
1975	1,468	+0.50%
1982	1,435	−0.32%
1990	1,473	+0.33%
1999	1,416	−0.44%
2007	1,410	−0.05%
2012	1,448	+0.53%
2017	1,419	−0.40%
2023	1,351	−0.82%
Source: INSEE

== Geography ==
=== Location ===
The municipality borders two departments, Puy-de-Dôme and Corrèze, as well as the Nouvelle-Aquitaine region.

The territory of the municipality is adjacent to those of six other municipalities.

=== Geology and topography ===
The total municipality area is 4 216 acres, its elevation varies between 430 and 896 meters.

=== Hydrography ===
Lanobre is bordered to the west by the Dordogne River (reservoir lake of the Bort-les-Orgues dam) and to the east by its sub-tributary, the Tarentaine River, for more than eight kilometers. It is also watered to the north by the Tialle, a tributary of the Dordogne, and by the Panouille, the main tributary of the Tialle.

=== Climate ===
In 2010, the climate of the municipality was classified as a mountain climate, according to a CNRS study based on a series of data covering the period from 1971 to 2000. In 2020, Météo-France published a typology of the climates of metropolitan France in which the municipality is exposed to a mountain or mountain fringe climate and is in the Western and Northwestern climatic region of the Massif Central, characterized by an annual rainfall of 900 to 1,500 mm, peaking in autumn and winter.

For the period 1971-2000, the annual average temperature is 9.4 °C, with an annual thermal amplitude of 15.3 °C. The average annual precipitation total is 1,155 mm, with 12.8 days of precipitation in January and 8.3 days in July. For the period 1991-2020, the annual average temperature observed at the nearest Météo-France weather station, located in the municipality of Saignes approximately 12 km away as the crow flies, is 11.3 °C, and the average annual precipitation total is 987.0 mm. Looking ahead, the estimated climate parameters for the municipality for 2050, according to different greenhouse gas emission scenarios, can be found on a dedicated site published by Météo-France in November 2022.

== Urbanism ==
=== Typology ===
Lanobre is a rural municipality. Indeed, it is part of the communes with low or very low density, according to the INSEE's communal density grid.

Furthermore, the municipality is part of the attraction area of Bort-les-Orgues, where it serves as a peripheral commune. This area, which includes 11 communes, is categorized in the areas with less than 50,000 inhabitants.

The municipality, bordered by an inland body of water with an area of more than 1,000 hectares, the Bort-les-Orgues lake, is also a coastal municipality in the sense of the law of January 3, 1986, known as the Coastal Law. Specific urban planning provisions apply in order to preserve natural spaces, sites, landscapes, and the ecological balance of the coast, for example, the principle of non-constructibility, outside of urbanized spaces, on the coastal strip of 100 meters, or more if the local urban plan provides for it.

=== Land use ===
Land use in the municipality, as reflected by the European database on biophysical land cover Corine Land Cover (CLC), is marked by the importance of agricultural areas (46.7% in 2018), a proportion almost equivalent to that of 1990 (47.7%). The detailed distribution in 2018 is as follows: forests (43.7%), meadows (43.6%), inland waters (5.2%), urban areas (3.6%), heterogeneous agricultural areas (3.1%), shrubland and/or herbaceous vegetation (0.7%), industrial or commercial areas and communication networks (0.1%). The evolution of land use in the municipality and its infrastructure can be observed on various cartographic representations of the territory: the Cassini map (18th century), the state-major map (1820-1866), and the maps or aerial photographs by the IGN for the current period (1950 to today).

=== Housing ===
In 2018, the total number of housing units in the municipality was 952, while it was 941 in 2013 and 865 in 2008.

Among these housing units, 73.5% were primary residences, 11.2% were secondary residences, and 15.3% were vacant housing. These housing units were 92.4% individual houses and 7.6% apartments.

The table below shows the typology of housing in Lanobre in 2018 in comparison with that of Cantal and the whole of France. A notable characteristic of the housing stock is thus a proportion of secondary residences and occasional housing (11.2%) that is lower than that of the department (20.4%) but higher than that of the whole of France (9.7%). Regarding the occupancy status of these housing units, 79.8% of the inhabitants of the municipality own their housing (80% in 2013), compared to 70.4% for Cantal and 57.5% for the whole of France.

Housing in Lanobre in 2018.
Typology	Lanobre	Cantal	France
Primary Residences (in %)	73,5	67,7	82,1
Secondary (or occasional) residences (in %)	11,2	20,4	9,7
Vacant housings (en %)	15,3	11,9	8,2

== History ==
The territory of Lanobre is believed to have been inhabited since the Stone Age, approximately 5,000 years before Christ. Prehistoric and Gallo-Roman remains, discovered at the beginning of the 19th century at "Lac de Bramefont" demonstrate the ancient occupation of the land. It was not until 1792 that the municipality of Lanobre was established and then attached to the Cantal department. Lanobre had been a lordship since the 13th century.

== See also ==
- Communes of the Cantal department
