= Saint-Pierre, Cantal =

Commune in Auvergne-Rhône-Alpes, France

Saint-Pierre
- Commune
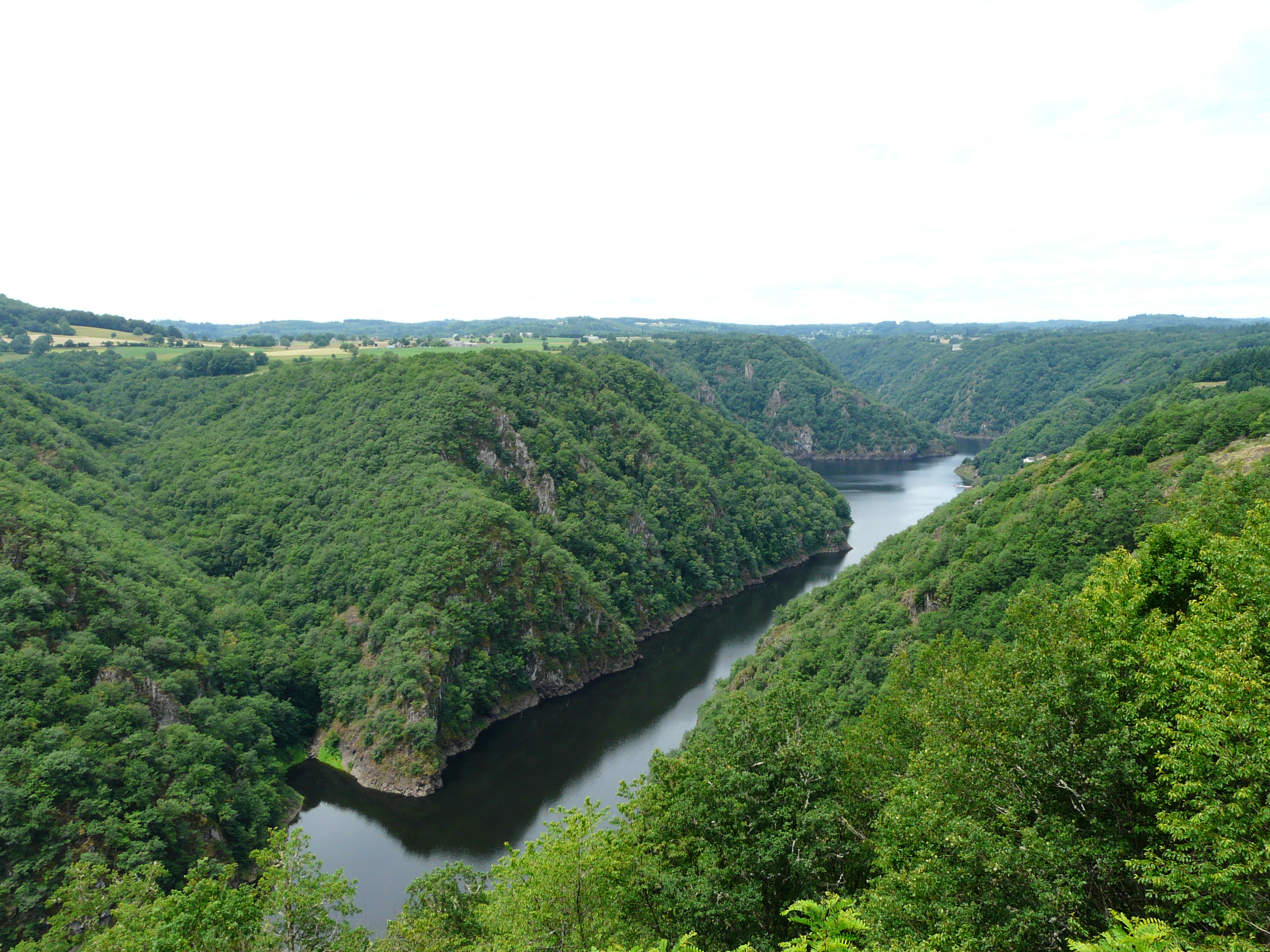
- The river Dordogne seen from Saint Nazaire, the entire left part of the reservoir is located within Saint-Pierre

- Coat of arms
- Location of Saint-Pierre
- Location within France Location within Auvergne-Rhône-Alpes
- Coordinates: 45°23′21″N 2°23′20″E
- Country: France
- Region: Auvergne-Rhône-Alpes
- Department: Cantal
- Arrondissement: Mauriac
- Canton: Ydes

Government
  - Mayor (2020–2026): Daniel Salvary
- Area^{1}: 14.27 km^{2} (5.51 sq mi)
- Elevation: 600 m (2,000 ft)
- Highest elevation: 692 m (2,270 ft)
- Lowest elevation: 352 m (1,155 ft)
- Population (2023): 146
  - Density: 10.2/km^{2} (26.5/sq mi)
- Time zone: UTC+01:00 (CET)
  - Summer (DST): UTC+02:00 (CEST)
- INSEE/Postal code: 15206 /15350
- ^{1} French Land Register data, which excludes lakes, ponds, glaciers > 1 km^{2} (0.386 sq mi or 247 acres) and river estuaries.

Saint-Pierre (French pronunciation: [sɛ̃ pjɛʁ]; Occitan: Sant Pierre) is a commune in the Cantal department in south-central France.

== Population ==
Historical population
Year	Pop.	±% p.a.
1968	208	—
1975	148	−4.75%
1982	148	+0.00%
1990	148	+0.00%
1999	150	+0.15%
2007	173	+1.80%
2012	152	−2.56%
2017	134	−2.49%
2023	146	+1.44%
Source: INSEE

== See also ==
- Communes of the Cantal department
