= Saignes =

Saignes may refer to the following places in France:

- Saignes, Cantal, a commune in the Cantal department
- Saignes, Lot, a commune in the Lot department
