= Sourniac =

Commune in Auvergne-Rhône-Alpes, France

- Commune
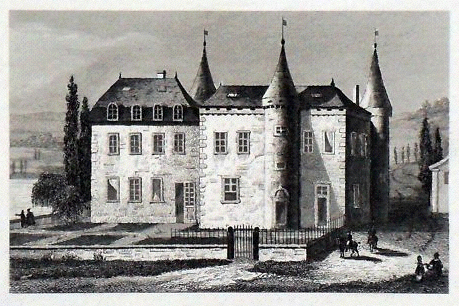
- The Chateau de Sourniac
- Location of Sourniac
- Location within France Location within Auvergne-Rhône-Alpes
- Coordinates: 45°16′41″N 2°20′24″E
- Country: France
- Region: Auvergne-Rhône-Alpes
- Department: Cantal
- Arrondissement: Mauriac
- Canton: Ydes
- Intercommunality: Pays de Mauriac

Government
  - Mayor (2020–2026): Serge Viallemonteil
- Area^{1}: 11.72 km^{2} (4.53 sq mi)
- Elevation: 629 m (2,064 ft)
- Highest elevation: 706 m (2,316 ft)
- Lowest elevation: 471 m (1,545 ft)
- Population (2023): 195
  - Density: 16.6/km^{2} (43.1/sq mi)
- Time zone: UTC+01:00 (CET)
  - Summer (DST): UTC+02:00 (CEST)
- INSEE/Postal code: 15230 /15200
- ^{1} French Land Register data, which excludes lakes, ponds, glaciers > 1 km^{2} (0.386 sq mi or 247 acres) and river estuaries.

Sourniac (French pronunciation: [suʁnjak]; Occitan: Sornhac) is a commune in the Cantal department in south-central France.

== Population ==
Historical population
Year	Pop.	±% p.a.
1968	166	—
1975	126	−3.86%
1982	162	+3.66%
1990	182	+1.47%
1999	178	−0.25%
2007	190	+0.82%
2012	205	+1.53%
2017	201	−0.39%
2023	195	−0.50%
Source: INSEE

== See also ==
- Communes of the Cantal department
