= Madic =

Commune in Auvergne-Rhône-Alpes, France

- Commune
- Location of Madic
- Location within France Location within Auvergne-Rhône-Alpes
- Coordinates: 45°22′48″N 2°27′30″E
- Country: France
- Region: Auvergne-Rhône-Alpes
- Department: Cantal
- Arrondissement: Mauriac
- Canton: Ydes
- Intercommunality: Sumène Artense

Government
  - Mayor (2020–2026): Christophe Morange
- Area^{1}: 6.63 km^{2} (2.56 sq mi)
- Elevation: 430 m (1,410 ft)
- Highest elevation: 580 m (1,900 ft)
- Lowest elevation: 400 m (1,300 ft)
- Population (2023): 202
  - Density: 30.5/km^{2} (78.9/sq mi)
- Time zone: UTC+01:00 (CET)
  - Summer (DST): UTC+02:00 (CEST)
- INSEE/Postal code: 15111 /15210
- ^{1} French Land Register data, which excludes lakes, ponds, glaciers > 1 km^{2} (0.386 sq mi or 247 acres) and river estuaries.

Madic (French pronunciation: [madik]) is a commune in the Cantal department in south-central France.

== Population ==
Historical population
Year	Pop.	±% p.a.
1968	157	—
1975	196	+3.22%
1982	207	+0.78%
1990	239	+1.81%
1999	248	+0.41%
2007	227	−1.10%
2012	207	−1.83%
2017	207	+0.00%
2023	202	−0.41%
Source: INSEE

== See also ==
- Communes of the Cantal department
