= Beaulieu, Cantal =

Commune in Auvergne-Rhône-Alpes, France

Beaulieu
- Commune
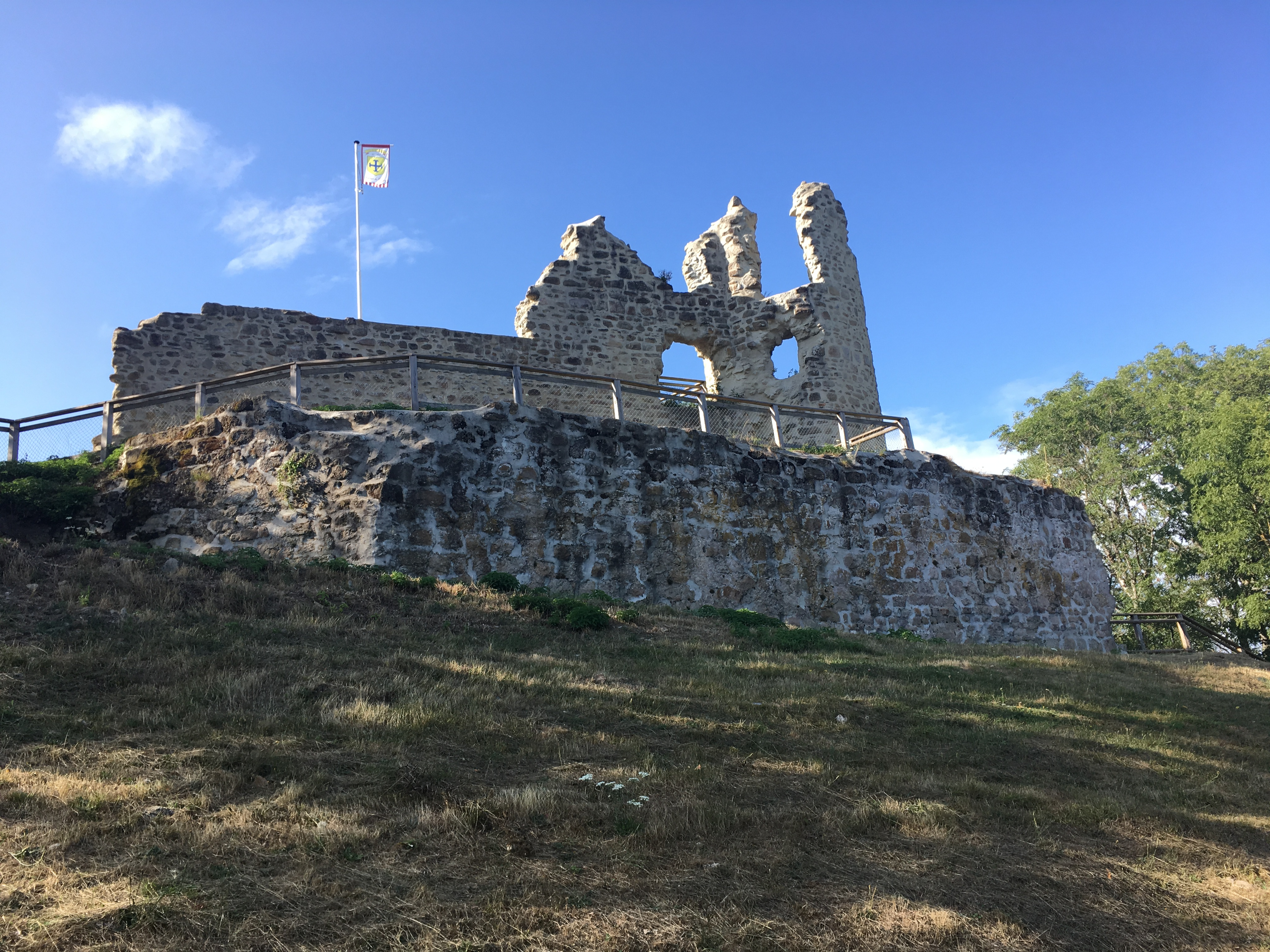
- The ruins of the Château de Thynières, in Beaulieu

- Coat of arms
- Location of Beaulieu
- Location within France Location within Auvergne-Rhône-Alpes
- Coordinates: 45°27′27″N 2°30′46″E
- Country: France
- Region: Auvergne-Rhône-Alpes
- Department: Cantal
- Arrondissement: Mauriac
- Canton: Ydes

Government
  - Mayor (2020–2026): Alain Vergne
- Area^{1}: 7.64 km^{2} (2.95 sq mi)
- Highest elevation: 748 m (2,454 ft)
- Lowest elevation: 531 m (1,742 ft)
- Population (2023): 84
  - Density: 11/km^{2} (28/sq mi)
- Time zone: UTC+01:00 (CET)
  - Summer (DST): UTC+02:00 (CEST)
- INSEE/Postal code: 15020 /15270
- ^{1} French Land Register data, which excludes lakes, ponds, glaciers > 1 km^{2} (0.386 sq mi or 247 acres) and river estuaries.

Beaulieu (French pronunciation: [boljø]; Occitan: Bel Luòc) is a commune in the Cantal department in south-central France.

== Population ==
Historical population
Year	Pop.	±% p.a.
1968	137	—
1975	139	+0.21%
1982	150	+1.09%
1990	132	−1.59%
1999	137	+0.41%
2007	116	−2.06%
2012	89	−5.16%
2017	94	+1.10%
2023	84	−1.86%
Source: INSEE

== See also ==
- Communes of the Cantal department
