= Trémouille =

Commune in Auvergne-Rhône-Alpes, France

- Commune
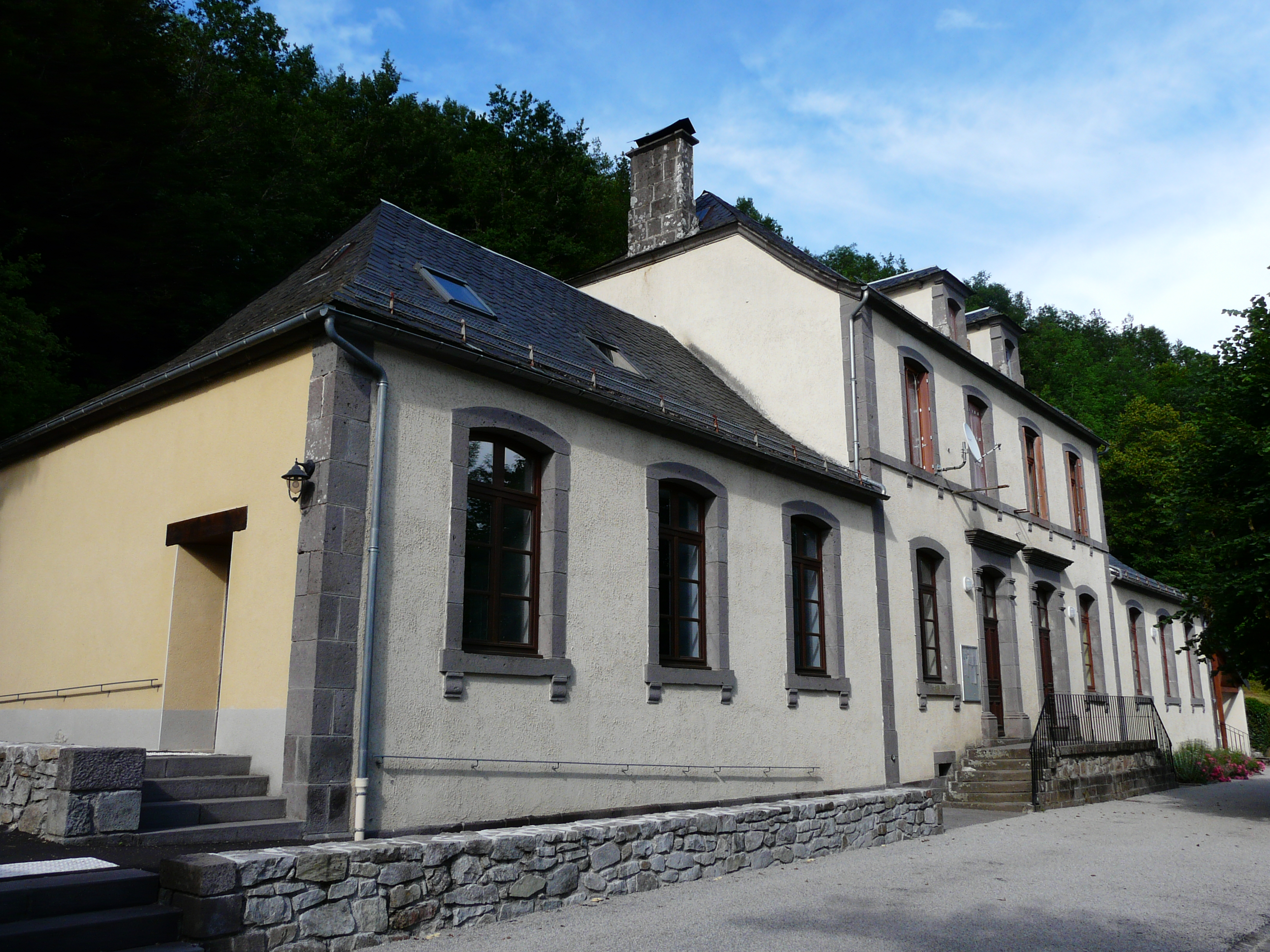
- The town hall in Trémouille
- Location of Trémouille
- Location within France Location within Auvergne-Rhône-Alpes
- Coordinates: 45°22′26″N 2°40′32″E
- Country: France
- Region: Auvergne-Rhône-Alpes
- Department: Cantal
- Arrondissement: Mauriac
- Canton: Ydes
- Intercommunality: Sumène Artense

Government
  - Mayor (2020–2026): Joëlle Noël
- Area^{1}: 29.09 km^{2} (11.23 sq mi)
- Elevation: 710 m (2,330 ft)
- Highest elevation: 961 m (3,153 ft)
- Lowest elevation: 563 m (1,847 ft)
- Population (2023): 167
  - Density: 5.74/km^{2} (14.9/sq mi)
- Time zone: UTC+01:00 (CET)
  - Summer (DST): UTC+02:00 (CEST)
- INSEE/Postal code: 15240 /15270
- ^{1} French Land Register data, which excludes lakes, ponds, glaciers > 1 km^{2} (0.386 sq mi or 247 acres) and river estuaries.

Trémouille (French pronunciation: [tʁemuj]; Occitan: Tremolha) is a commune in the Cantal department in south-central France.

== Geography ==
The river Rhue forms most of the commune's southwestern border.

== Population ==
Historical population
Year	Pop.	±% p.a.
1968	403	—
1975	319	−3.28%
1982	291	−1.30%
1990	237	−2.53%
1999	203	−1.71%
2007	194	−0.57%
2012	181	−1.38%
2017	175	−0.67%
2023	167	−0.78%
Source: INSEE

== See also ==
- Communes of the Cantal department
- Trémouille-Saint-Loup
