= Le Monteil, Cantal =

Commune in Auvergne-Rhône-Alpes, France

Le Monteil
- Commune
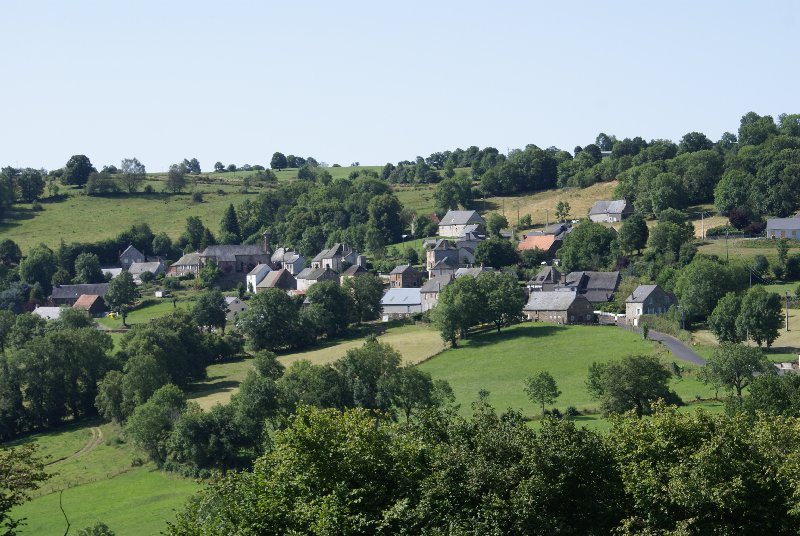
- A general view of Le Monteil
- Location of Le Monteil
- Location within France Location within Auvergne-Rhône-Alpes
- Coordinates: 45°17′56″N 2°30′01″E
- Country: France
- Region: Auvergne-Rhône-Alpes
- Department: Cantal
- Arrondissement: Mauriac
- Canton: Ydes
- Intercommunality: Sumène Artense

Government
  - Mayor (2020–2026): Jean-Michel Hojak
- Area^{1}: 23.47 km^{2} (9.06 sq mi)
- Elevation: 800 m (2,600 ft)
- Highest elevation: 1,022 m (3,353 ft)
- Lowest elevation: 553 m (1,814 ft)
- Population (2023): 261
  - Density: 11.1/km^{2} (28.8/sq mi)
- Time zone: UTC+01:00 (CET)
  - Summer (DST): UTC+02:00 (CEST)
- INSEE/Postal code: 15131 /15240
- ^{1} French Land Register data, which excludes lakes, ponds, glaciers > 1 km^{2} (0.386 sq mi or 247 acres) and river estuaries.

Le Monteil (French pronunciation: [lə mɔ̃tɛj]; Occitan: Lo Montelh) is a commune in the Cantal department in south-central France.

== Population ==
Historical population
Year	Pop.	±% p.a.
1968	539	—
1975	421	−3.47%
1982	378	−1.53%
1990	301	−2.81%
1999	274	−1.04%
2007	269	−0.23%
2012	263	−0.45%
2017	285	+1.62%
2023	261	−1.46%
Source: INSEE

== See also ==
- Communes of the Cantal department
