= Vebret =

Commune in Auvergne-Rhône-Alpes, France

- Commune
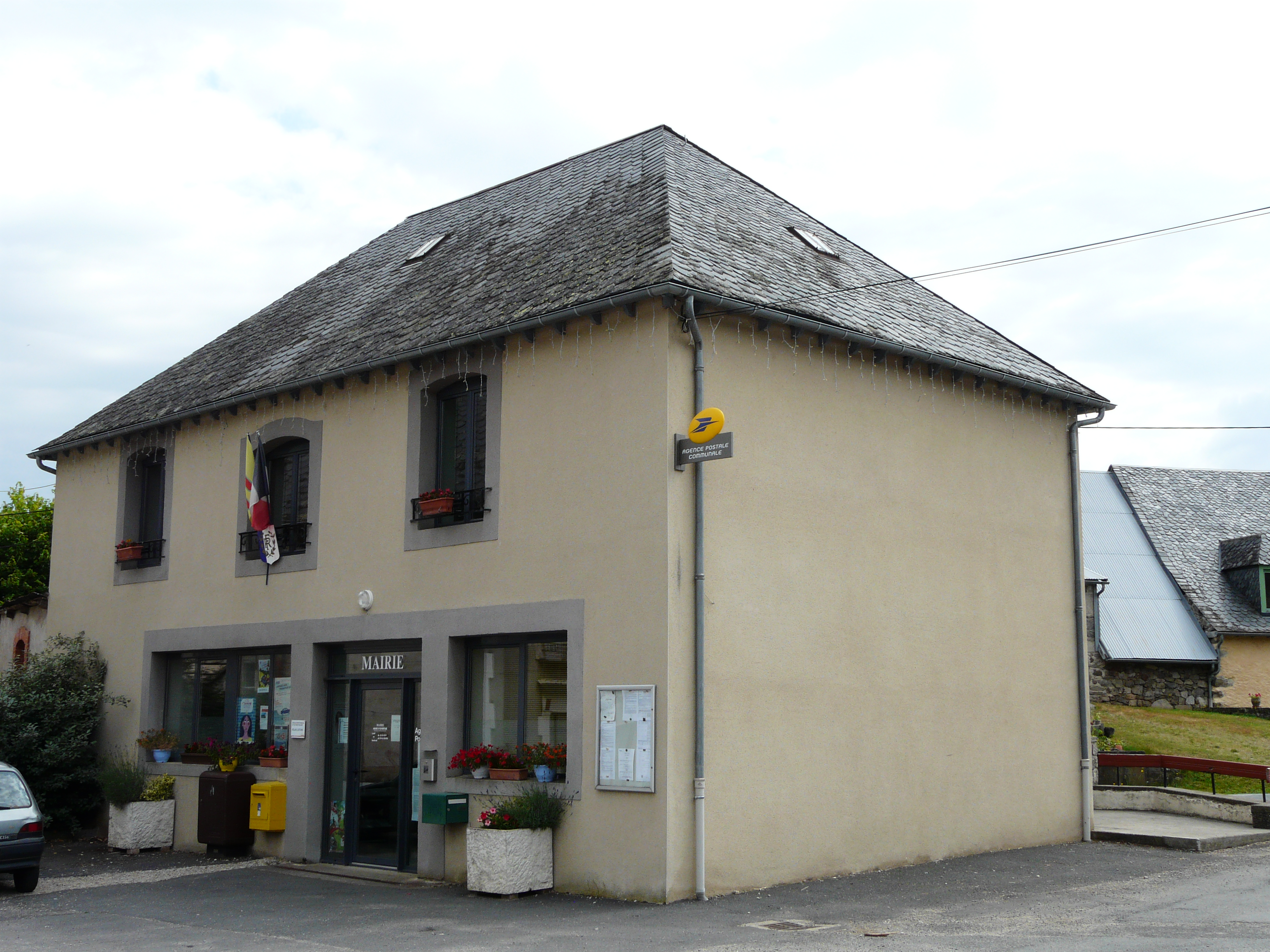
- The town hall in Vebret
- Location of Vebret
- Location within France Location within Auvergne-Rhône-Alpes
- Coordinates: 45°20′25″N 2°31′14″E
- Country: France
- Region: Auvergne-Rhône-Alpes
- Department: Cantal
- Arrondissement: Mauriac
- Canton: Ydes
- Intercommunality: Sumène Artense

Government
  - Mayor (2020–2026): Fabrice Meunier
- Area^{1}: 24.43 km^{2} (9.43 sq mi)
- Elevation: 480 m (1,570 ft)
- Highest elevation: 727 m (2,385 ft)
- Lowest elevation: 425 m (1,394 ft)
- Population (2023): 516
  - Density: 21.1/km^{2} (54.7/sq mi)
- Time zone: UTC+01:00 (CET)
  - Summer (DST): UTC+02:00 (CEST)
- INSEE/Postal code: 15250 /15240
- ^{1} French Land Register data, which excludes lakes, ponds, glaciers > 1 km^{2} (0.386 sq mi or 247 acres) and river estuaries.

Vebret (French pronunciation: [vəbʁɛ]; Occitan: Vebret) is a commune in the Cantal department in south-central France.

== Geography ==
The river Rhue forms all of the commune's northern border.

== Population ==
Historical population
Year	Pop.	±% p.a.
1968	578	—
1975	524	−1.39%
1982	559	+0.93%
1990	533	−0.59%
1999	503	−0.64%
2007	457	−1.19%
2012	493	+1.53%
2017	506	+0.52%
2023	516	+0.33%
Source: INSEE

== See also ==
- Communes of the Cantal department
