= Rhue (river) =

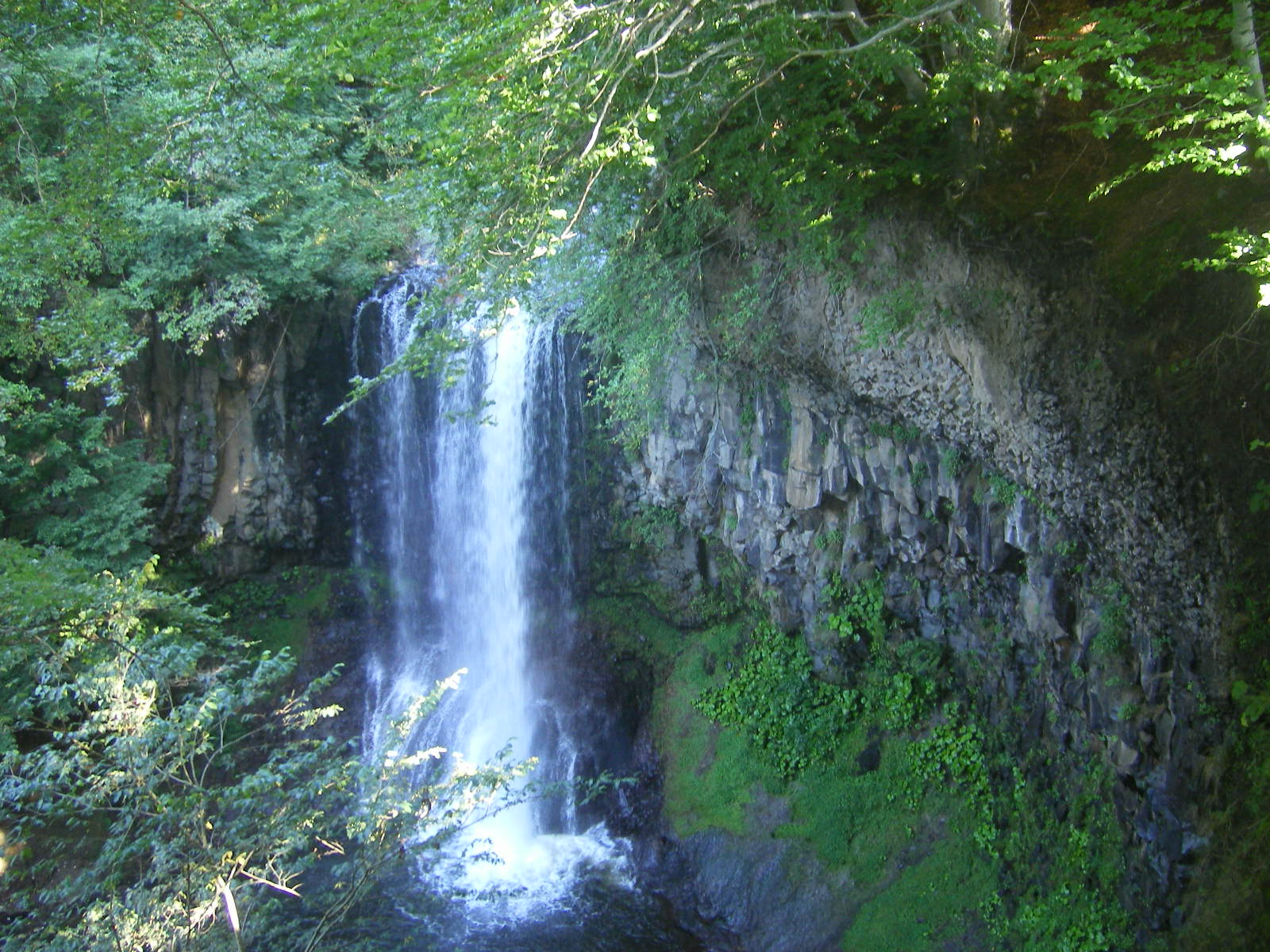
- The Rhue at Égliseneuve-d'Entraigues

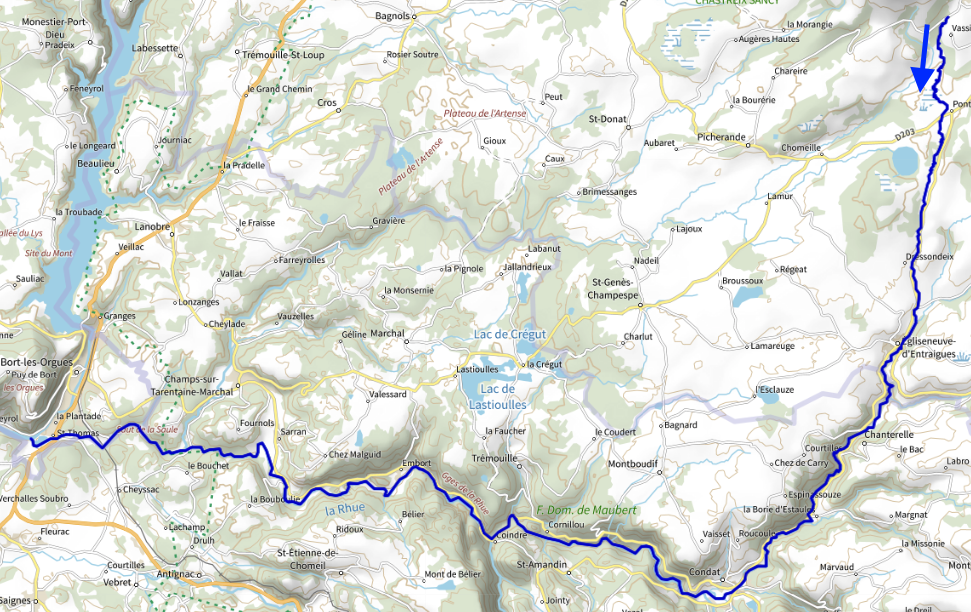

Location
- Country: France

Physical characteristics
- Source
  - location: Besse-et-Saint-Anastaise
  - coordinates: 45°29′51″N 02°50′42″E
  - elevation: 1,250 m (4,100 ft)
- Mouth
  - location: Dordogne
  - coordinates: 45°22′51″N 02°28′40″E
  - elevation: 410 m (1,350 ft)
- Length: 56.6 km (35.2 mi)
- Basin size: 641 km^{2} (247 sq mi)
- Discharge
  - average: 20 m^{3}/s (710 cu ft/s)

Basin features
- Progression: Dordogne→ Gironde estuary→ Atlantic Ocean

The Rhue (French pronunciation: [ʁy]; also called Grande Rhue, [ɡʁɑ̃d ʁy]) is a 56.6-kilometre (35.2 mi) river in the Puy-de-Dôme, Cantal and Corrèze départements, south central France. Its source is at Besse-et-Saint-Anastaise, near Super Besse, in the parc naturel régional des volcans d'Auvergne, 4.5 kilometres (2.8 mi) southeast of the puy de Sancy. It flows generally southwest. It is a left tributary of the Dordogne into which it flows at Bort-les-Orgues.

Its main tributaries are the Santoire, the Petite Rhue and the Tarentaine.

== Communes along its course ==
This list is ordered from source to mouth:

- Puy-de-Dôme: Besse-et-Saint-Anastaise, Picherande, Égliseneuve-d'Entraigues
- Cantal: Chanterelle, Condat, Saint-Amandin, Montboudif, Trémouille, Saint-Étienne-de-Chomeil, Champs-sur-Tarentaine-Marchal, Antignac, Vebret
- Corrèze: Bort-les-Orgues
