= La Monselie =

Commune in Auvergne-Rhône-Alpes, France

- Commune
- Location of La Monselie
- Location within France Location within Auvergne-Rhône-Alpes
- Coordinates: 45°19′28″N 2°33′19″E
- Country: France
- Region: Auvergne-Rhône-Alpes
- Department: Cantal
- Arrondissement: Mauriac
- Canton: Ydes
- Intercommunality: Sumène Artense

Government
  - Mayor (2020–2026): Philippe Delchet
- Area^{1}: 9.49 km^{2} (3.66 sq mi)
- Elevation: 736 m (2,415 ft)
- Highest elevation: 940 m (3,080 ft)
- Lowest elevation: 515 m (1,690 ft)
- Population (2023): 112
  - Density: 11.8/km^{2} (30.6/sq mi)
- Time zone: UTC+01:00 (CET)
  - Summer (DST): UTC+02:00 (CEST)
- INSEE/Postal code: 15128 /15240
- ^{1} French Land Register data, which excludes lakes, ponds, glaciers > 1 km^{2} (0.386 sq mi or 247 acres) and river estuaries.

La Monselie (French pronunciation: [la mɔ̃s(ə)li]; Occitan: La Monciliá) is a commune in the Cantal department in south-central France.

== Population ==
Historical population
Year	Pop.	±% p.a.
1968	181	—
1975	154	−2.28%
1982	141	−1.25%
1990	134	−0.63%
1999	114	−1.78%
2007	116	+0.22%
2012	110	−1.06%
2017	111	+0.18%
2023	112	+0.15%
Source: INSEE

== See also ==
- Communes of the Cantal department
