= Arches, Cantal =

Commune in Auvergne-Rhône-Alpes, France

Arches
- Commune
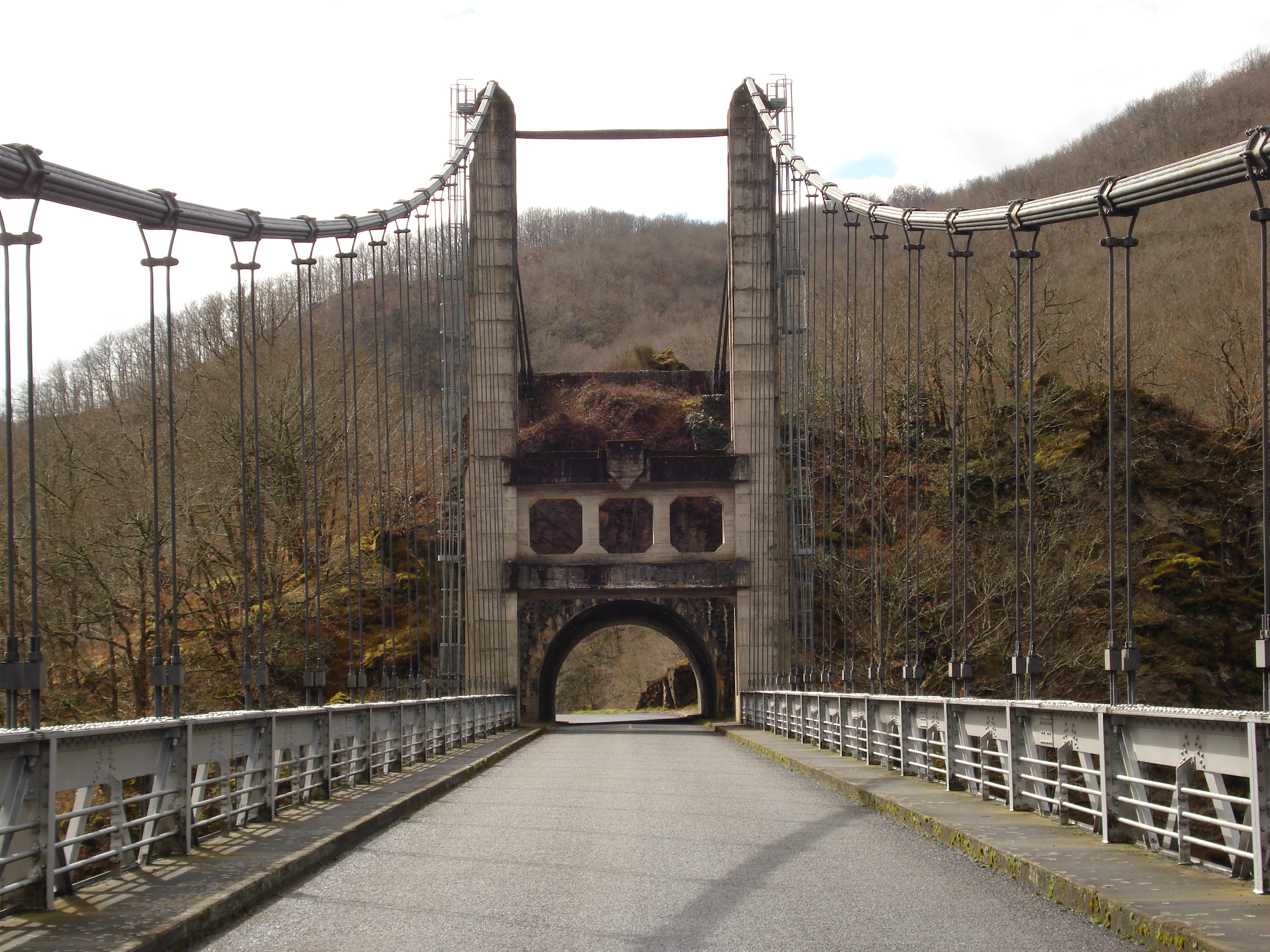
- The Saint-Projet bridge over the Dordogne river, in the commune of Arches
- Location of Arches
- Location within France Location within Auvergne-Rhône-Alpes
- Coordinates: 45°18′24″N 2°19′42″E
- Country: France
- Region: Auvergne-Rhône-Alpes
- Department: Cantal
- Arrondissement: Mauriac
- Canton: Ydes
- Intercommunality: Pays de Mauriac

Government
  - Mayor (2020–2026): Yves Magne
- Area^{1}: 16.15 km^{2} (6.24 sq mi)
- Elevation: 630 m (2,070 ft)
- Highest elevation: 687 m (2,254 ft)
- Lowest elevation: 321 m (1,053 ft)
- Population (2023): 192
  - Density: 11.9/km^{2} (30.8/sq mi)
- Time zone: UTC+01:00 (CET)
  - Summer (DST): UTC+02:00 (CEST)
- INSEE/Postal code: 15010 /15200
- ^{1} French Land Register data, which excludes lakes, ponds, glaciers > 1 km^{2} (0.386 sq mi or 247 acres) and river estuaries.

Arches (French pronunciation: [aʁʃ]; Occitan: Archas) is a commune in the Cantal department in south-central France.

== Geography ==
The Sumène forms the commune's northeastern border, then flows into the Dordogne, which forms the commune's northern and western border.

== Population ==
Historical population
Year	Pop.	±% p.a.
1968	248	—
1975	209	−2.41%
1982	198	−0.77%
1990	174	−1.60%
1999	173	−0.06%
2007	182	+0.64%
2012	180	−0.22%
2017	181	+0.11%
2023	192	+0.99%
Source: INSEE

== See also ==
- Communes of the Cantal department
