= Jaleyrac =

Commune in Auvergne-Rhône-Alpes, France

- Commune
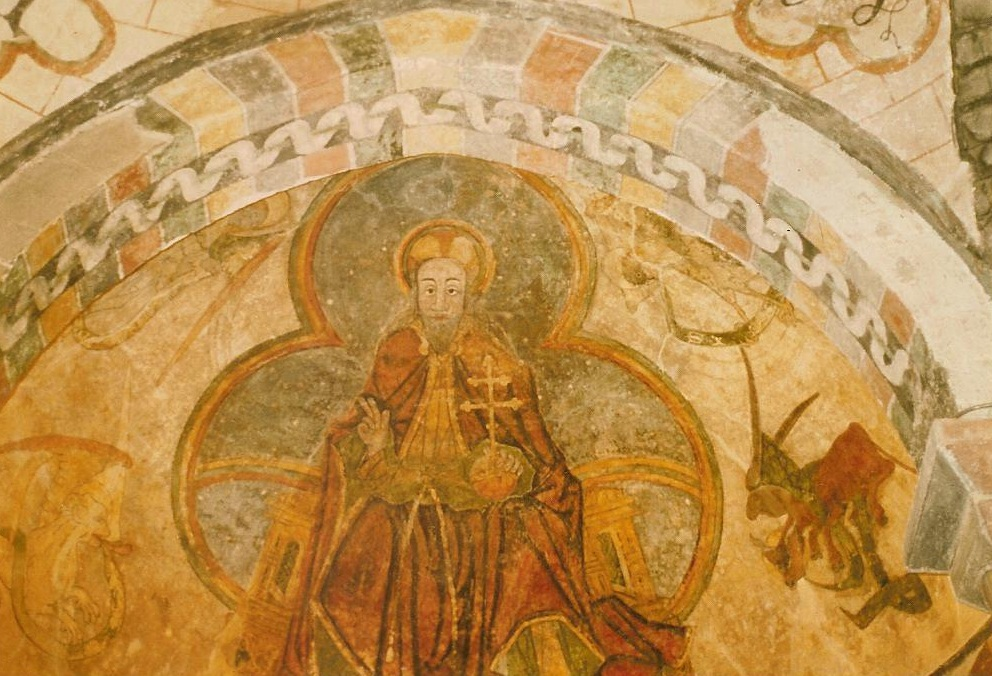
- Christ in majesty, in the church of Jaleyrac
- Location of Jaleyrac
- Location within France Location within Auvergne-Rhône-Alpes
- Coordinates: 45°15′54″N 2°22′16″E
- Country: France
- Region: Auvergne-Rhône-Alpes
- Department: Cantal
- Arrondissement: Mauriac
- Canton: Ydes
- Intercommunality: Pays de Mauriac

Government
  - Mayor (2020–2026): Olivier Roche
- Area^{1}: 16.86 km^{2} (6.51 sq mi)
- Elevation: 450 m (1,480 ft)
- Highest elevation: 742 m (2,434 ft)
- Lowest elevation: 348 m (1,142 ft)
- Population (2023): 356
  - Density: 21.1/km^{2} (54.7/sq mi)
- Time zone: UTC+01:00 (CET)
  - Summer (DST): UTC+02:00 (CEST)
- INSEE/Postal code: 15079 /15200
- ^{1} French Land Register data, which excludes lakes, ponds, glaciers > 1 km^{2} (0.386 sq mi or 247 acres) and river estuaries.

Jaleyrac (French pronunciation: [ʒaleʁak]; Occitan: Jaleirac) is a commune in the Cantal department in south-central France.

== Population ==
Historical population
Year	Pop.	±% p.a.
1968	297	—
1975	277	−0.99%
1982	261	−0.85%
1990	347	+3.62%
1999	374	+0.84%
2007	375	+0.03%
2012	372	−0.16%
2017	370	−0.11%
2023	356	−0.64%
Source: INSEE

== See also ==
- Communes of the Cantal department
