= Sauvat =

Commune in Auvergne-Rhône-Alpes, France

- Commune
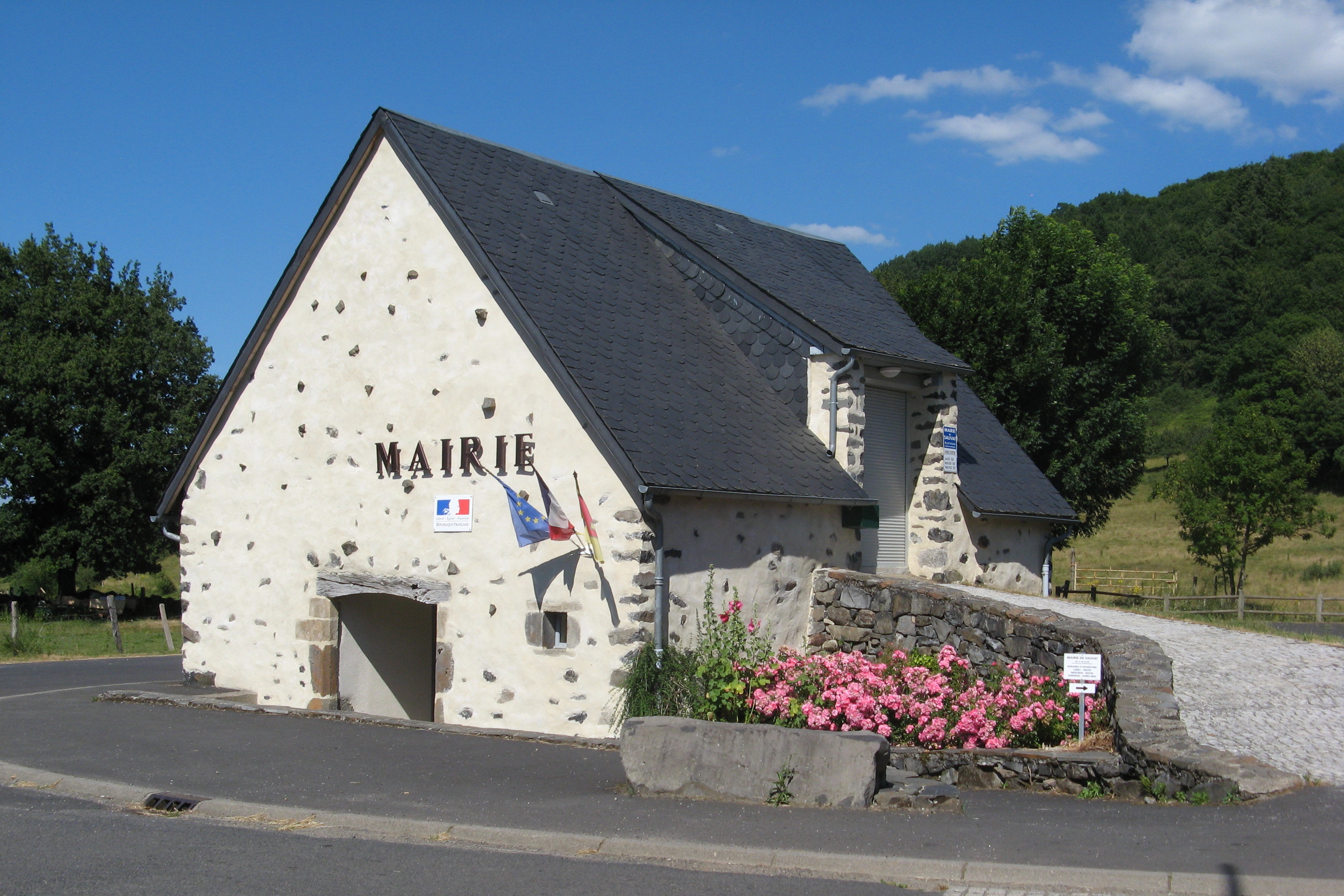
- Town hall
- Location of Sauvat
- Location within France Location within Auvergne-Rhône-Alpes
- Coordinates: 45°18′58″N 2°26′36″E
- Country: France
- Region: Auvergne-Rhône-Alpes
- Department: Cantal
- Arrondissement: Mauriac
- Canton: Ydes
- Intercommunality: Sumène Artense

Government
  - Mayor (2020–2026): Bertrand Forestier
- Area^{1}: 14.48 km^{2} (5.59 sq mi)
- Elevation: 540 m (1,770 ft)
- Highest elevation: 740 m (2,430 ft)
- Lowest elevation: 390 m (1,280 ft)
- Population (2023): 219
  - Density: 15.1/km^{2} (39.2/sq mi)
- Time zone: UTC+01:00 (CET)
  - Summer (DST): UTC+02:00 (CEST)
- INSEE/Postal code: 15223 /15240
- ^{1} French Land Register data, which excludes lakes, ponds, glaciers > 1 km^{2} (0.386 sq mi or 247 acres) and river estuaries.

Sauvat (French pronunciation: [sova]) is a commune in the Cantal department in south-central France.

== Population ==
Historical population
Year	Pop.	±% p.a.
1968	309	—
1975	236	−3.78%
1982	233	−0.18%
1990	215	−1.00%
1999	190	−1.36%
2007	191	+0.07%
2012	200	+0.93%
2017	214	+1.36%
2023	219	+0.39%
Source: INSEE

== See also ==
- Communes of the Cantal department
