= Chanterelle, Cantal =

Commune in Auvergne-Rhône-Alpes, France

Chanterelle
- Commune
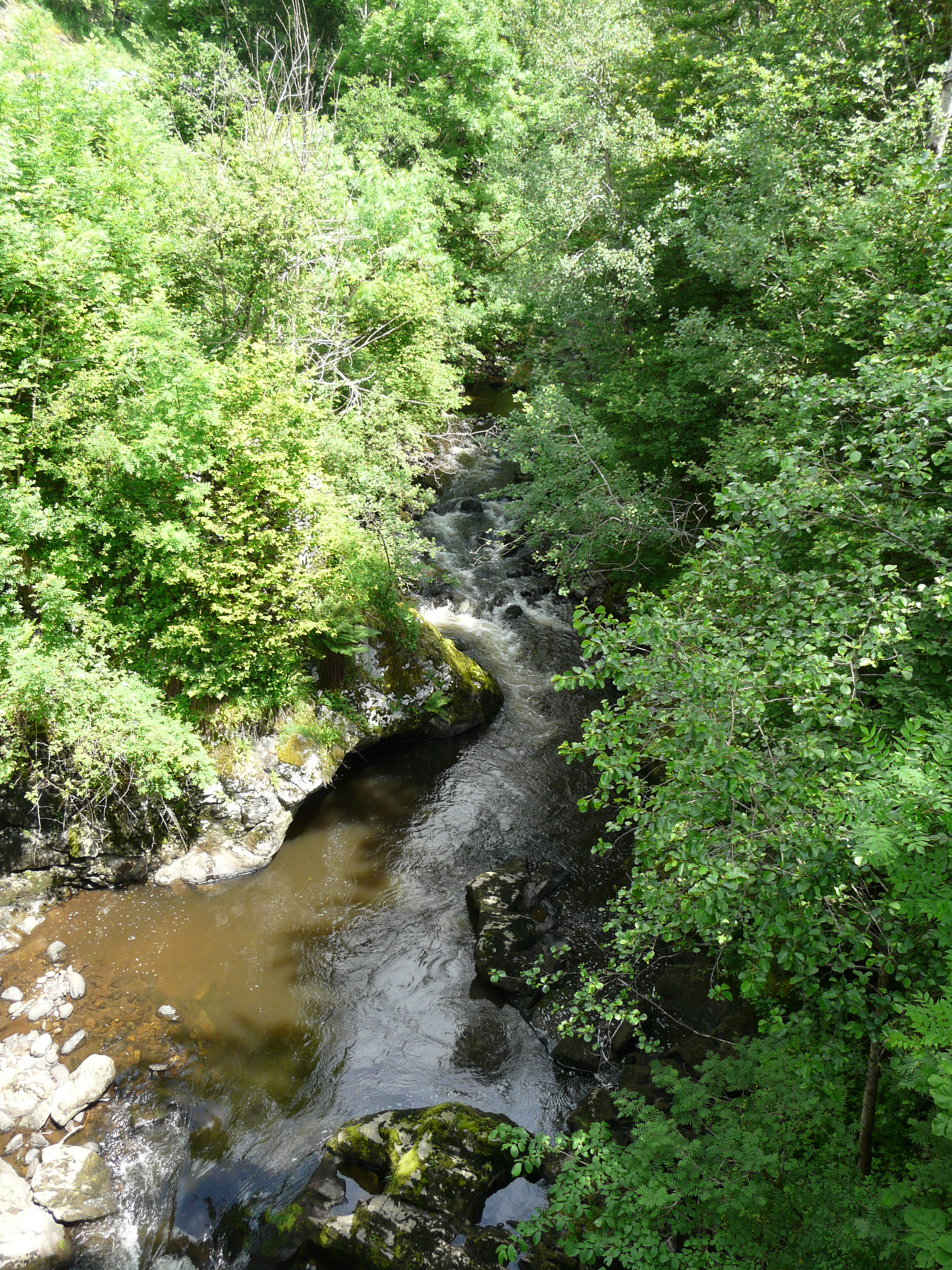
- The Rhue river in Chanterelle
- Location of Chanterelle
- Location within France Location within Auvergne-Rhône-Alpes
- Coordinates: 45°22′50″N 2°48′53″E
- Country: France
- Region: Auvergne-Rhône-Alpes
- Department: Cantal
- Arrondissement: Saint-Flour
- Canton: Riom-ès-Montagnes

Government
  - Mayor (2020–2026): Maurice Pallut
- Area^{1}: 19.72 km^{2} (7.61 sq mi)
- Elevation: 1,000 m (3,300 ft)
- Highest elevation: 1,225 m (4,019 ft)
- Lowest elevation: 800 m (2,600 ft)
- Population (2023): 99
  - Density: 5.0/km^{2} (13/sq mi)
- Time zone: UTC+01:00 (CET)
  - Summer (DST): UTC+02:00 (CEST)
- INSEE/Postal code: 15040 /15190
- ^{1} French Land Register data, which excludes lakes, ponds, glaciers > 1 km^{2} (0.386 sq mi or 247 acres) and river estuaries.

Chanterelle (French pronunciation: [ʃɑ̃tʁɛl]; Occitan: Chantarela) is a commune in the Cantal department in south-central France.

== Geography ==
The river Rhue flows southwest through the western part of the commune.

== Population ==
Historical population
Year	Pop.	±% p.a.
1968	307	—
1975	227	−4.22%
1982	161	−4.79%
1990	165	+0.31%
1999	150	−1.05%
2007	138	−1.04%
2012	96	−7.00%
2017	95	−0.21%
2023	99	+0.69%
Source: INSEE

== See also ==
- Communes of the Cantal department
