= Champs-sur-Tarentaine-Marchal =

Commune in Auvergne-Rhône-Alpes, France

- Commune
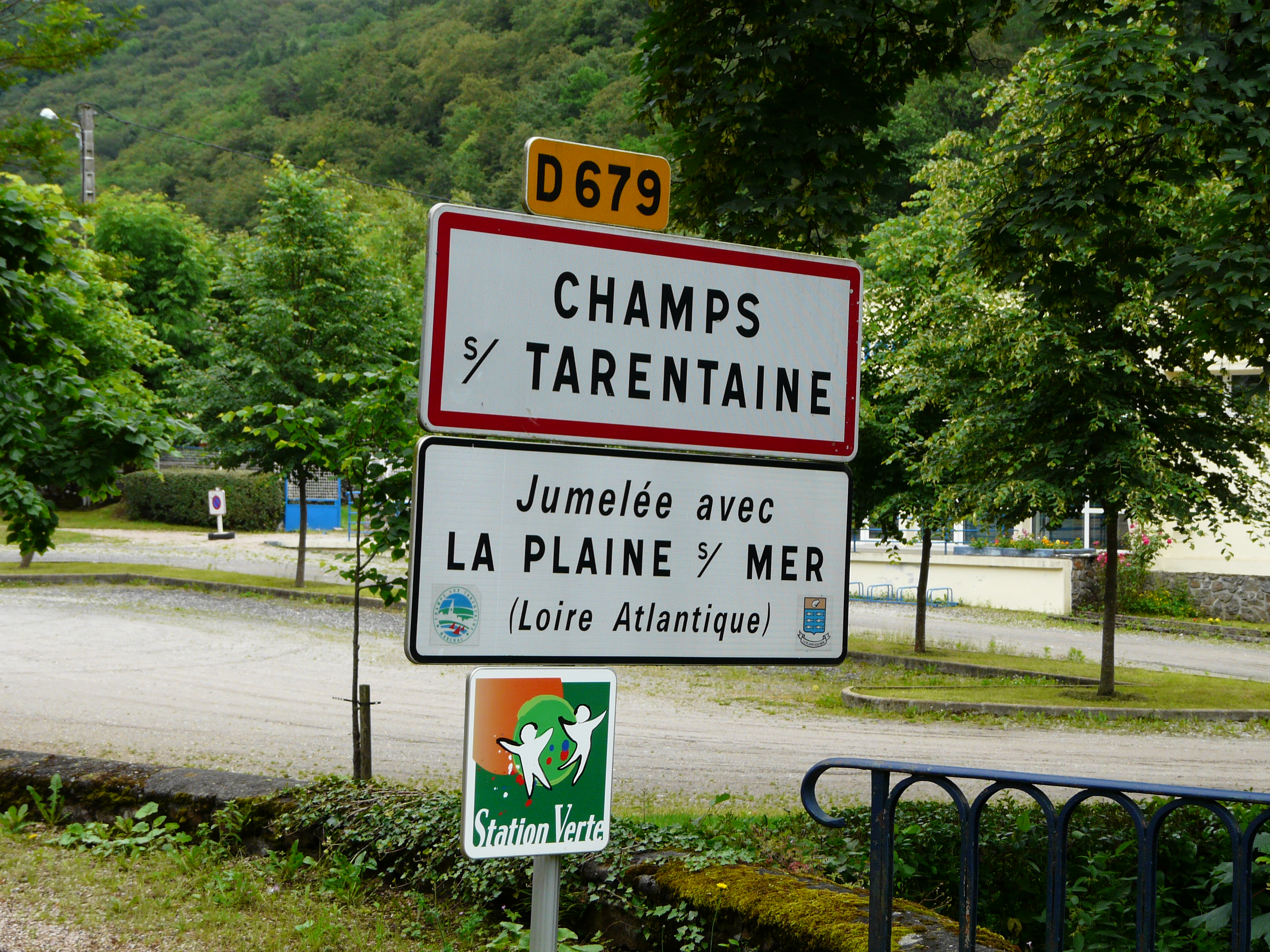
- Road signs entering Champs-sur-Tarentaine-Marchal, on the D679 road
- Location of Champs-sur-Tarentaine-Marchal
- Location within France Location within Auvergne-Rhône-Alpes
- Coordinates: 45°23′48″N 2°33′42″E
- Country: France
- Region: Auvergne-Rhône-Alpes
- Department: Cantal
- Arrondissement: Mauriac
- Canton: Ydes
- Intercommunality: Sumène Artense

Government
  - Mayor (2020–2026): Daniel Chevaleyre
- Area^{1}: 60.32 km^{2} (23.29 sq mi)
- Elevation: 450 m (1,480 ft)
- Highest elevation: 966 m (3,169 ft)
- Lowest elevation: 449 m (1,473 ft)
- Population (2023): 1,032
  - Density: 17.11/km^{2} (44.31/sq mi)
- Time zone: UTC+01:00 (CET)
  - Summer (DST): UTC+02:00 (CEST)
- INSEE/Postal code: 15038 /15270
- ^{1} French Land Register data, which excludes lakes, ponds, glaciers > 1 km^{2} (0.386 sq mi or 247 acres) and river estuaries.

Champs-sur-Tarentaine-Marchal (French pronunciation: [ʃɑ̃ syʁ taʁɑ̃tɛn maʁʃal]; Occitan: Champs e Marchalm) is a commune in the Cantal department in south-central France.

== Geography ==
The river Rhue forms all of the commune's southern border.

== Population ==
Historical population
Year	Pop.	±% p.a.
1968	1,527	—
1975	1,331	−1.94%
1982	1,141	−2.18%
1990	1,088	−0.59%
1999	1,044	−0.46%
2007	1,030	−0.17%
2012	1,031	+0.02%
2017	1,061	+0.58%
2023	1,032	−0.46%
Source: INSEE

== See also ==
- Communes of the Cantal department
