= Saint-Étienne-de-Chomeil =

Commune in Auvergne-Rhône-Alpes, France

- Commune
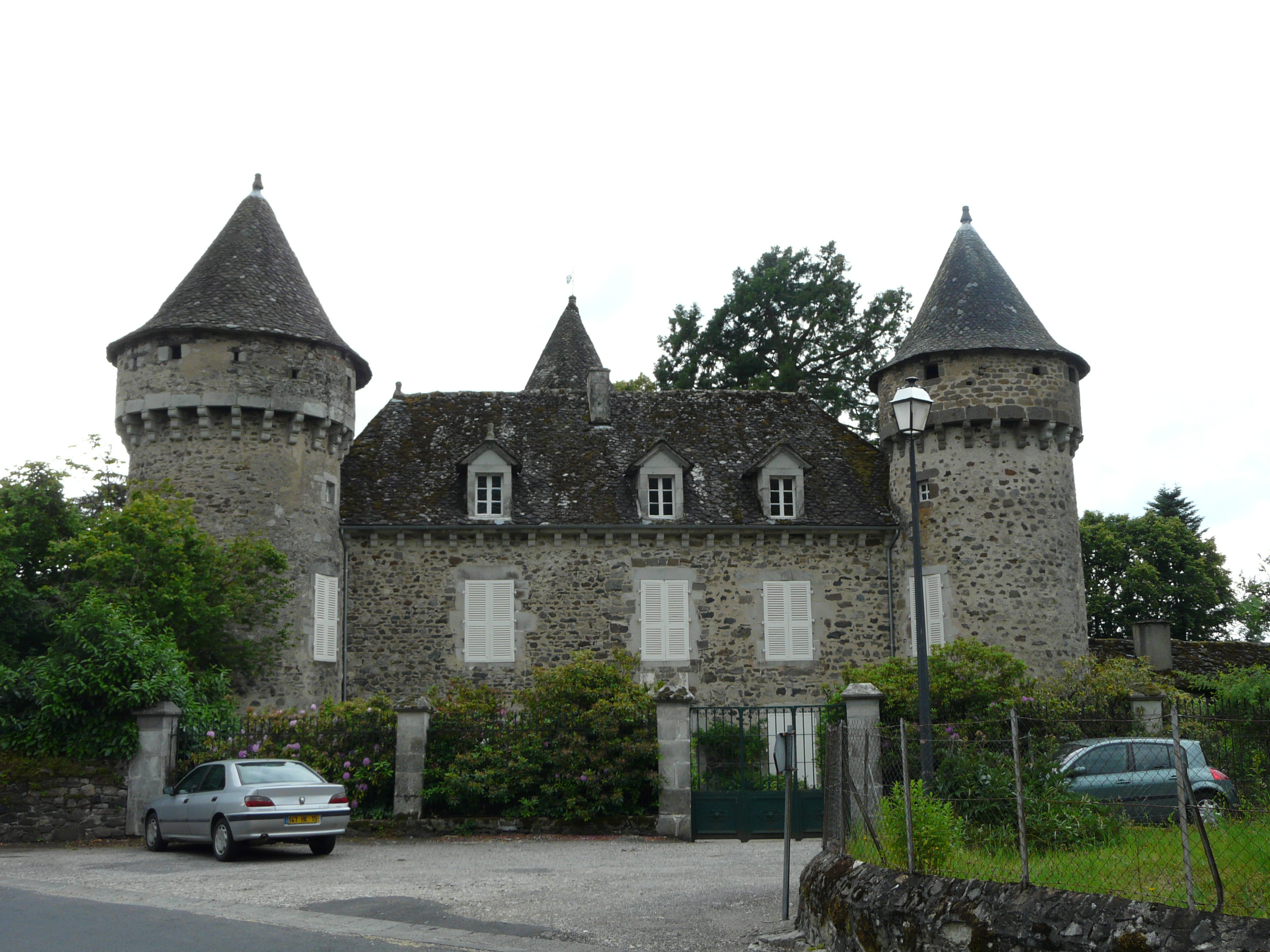
- The Château of Saint-Étienne, in Saint-Étienne-de-Chomeil

- Coat of arms
- Location of Saint-Étienne-de-Chomeil
- Location within France Location within Auvergne-Rhône-Alpes
- Coordinates: 45°20′38″N 2°36′12″E
- Country: France
- Region: Auvergne-Rhône-Alpes
- Department: Cantal
- Arrondissement: Mauriac
- Canton: Riom-ès-Montagnes

Government
  - Mayor (2020–2026): Gilbert Mommalier
- Area^{1}: 27.57 km^{2} (10.64 sq mi)
- Elevation: 700 m (2,300 ft)
- Highest elevation: 981 m (3,219 ft)
- Lowest elevation: 500 m (1,600 ft)
- Population (2023): 241
  - Density: 8.74/km^{2} (22.6/sq mi)
- Time zone: UTC+01:00 (CET)
  - Summer (DST): UTC+02:00 (CEST)
- INSEE/Postal code: 15185 /15400
- ^{1} French Land Register data, which excludes lakes, ponds, glaciers > 1 km^{2} (0.386 sq mi or 247 acres) and river estuaries.

Saint-Étienne-de-Chomeil (French pronunciation: [sɛ̃.t‿etjɛn də ʃɔmɛj]; Auvergnat: Sent Estèfe de Chaumelh, before 1962: Saint-Étienne-de-Riom) is a commune in the Cantal department in south-central France. It belongs to the Parc Naturel Régional des Volcans d'Auvergne.

== Geography ==
The river Rhue forms all of the commune's northern border.

== Population ==
Historical population
Year	Pop.	±% p.a.
1968	505	—
1975	442	−1.89%
1982	378	−2.21%
1990	310	−2.45%
1999	259	−1.98%
2007	217	−2.19%
2012	211	−0.56%
2017	230	+1.74%
2023	241	+0.78%
Source: INSEE

== Sites of interest ==
- The Church

Dedicated to Saint-Étienne — French for Saint Stephen — this church takes elements from both Roman and Gothic architectures. Built during the 11th and 12th centuries, it is a Monument Historique since 1993. One of its most characteristic features is its south-west capital, supporting a Sagittarius and two faces, one of which — the right one on the picture below — features an enormous tongue.

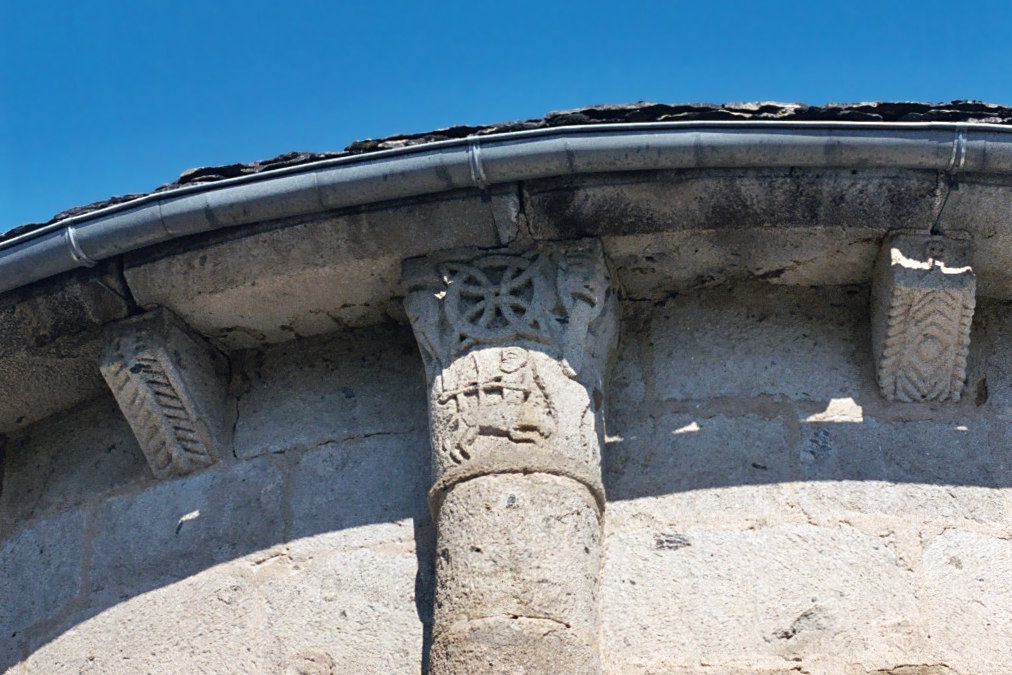
The capital sporting the Sagittarius (under the wheel)

- The Castle

Saint-Étienne's castle was built during the 14th century, then heavily modified from the 17th century onwards.

- Rocher d'Urlande (Rock of Urlande)

Witness of the volcanic history of the department, the Rocher d'Urlande is now a renowned rock-climbing site.

== See also ==
- Communes of the Cantal department
