= Canton of Ydes =

Coordinates: 45.35°N 2.44°E

- Canton
- Situation of the canton of Ydes in the department of Cantal
- Country: France
- Region: Auvergne-Rhône-Alpes
- Department: Cantal
- No. of communes: {{{nbcomm}}}
- Population (2023): 8,957
- INSEE code: 1515

The canton of Ydes is an administrative division of the Cantal department, southern France. It was created at the French canton reorganisation, which came into effect in March 2015. Its seat is in Ydes.

It consists of the following communes:

1. Antignac
2. Arches
3. Bassignac
4. Beaulieu
5. Champagnac
6. Champs-sur-Tarentaine-Marchal
7. Jaleyrac
8. Lanobre
9. Madic
10. La Monselie
11. Le Monteil
12. Saignes
13. Saint-Pierre
14. Sauvat
15. Sourniac
16. Trémouille
17. Vebret
18. Veyrières
19. Ydes
