= Ydes =

Commune in Auvergne-Rhône-Alpes, France

- Commune
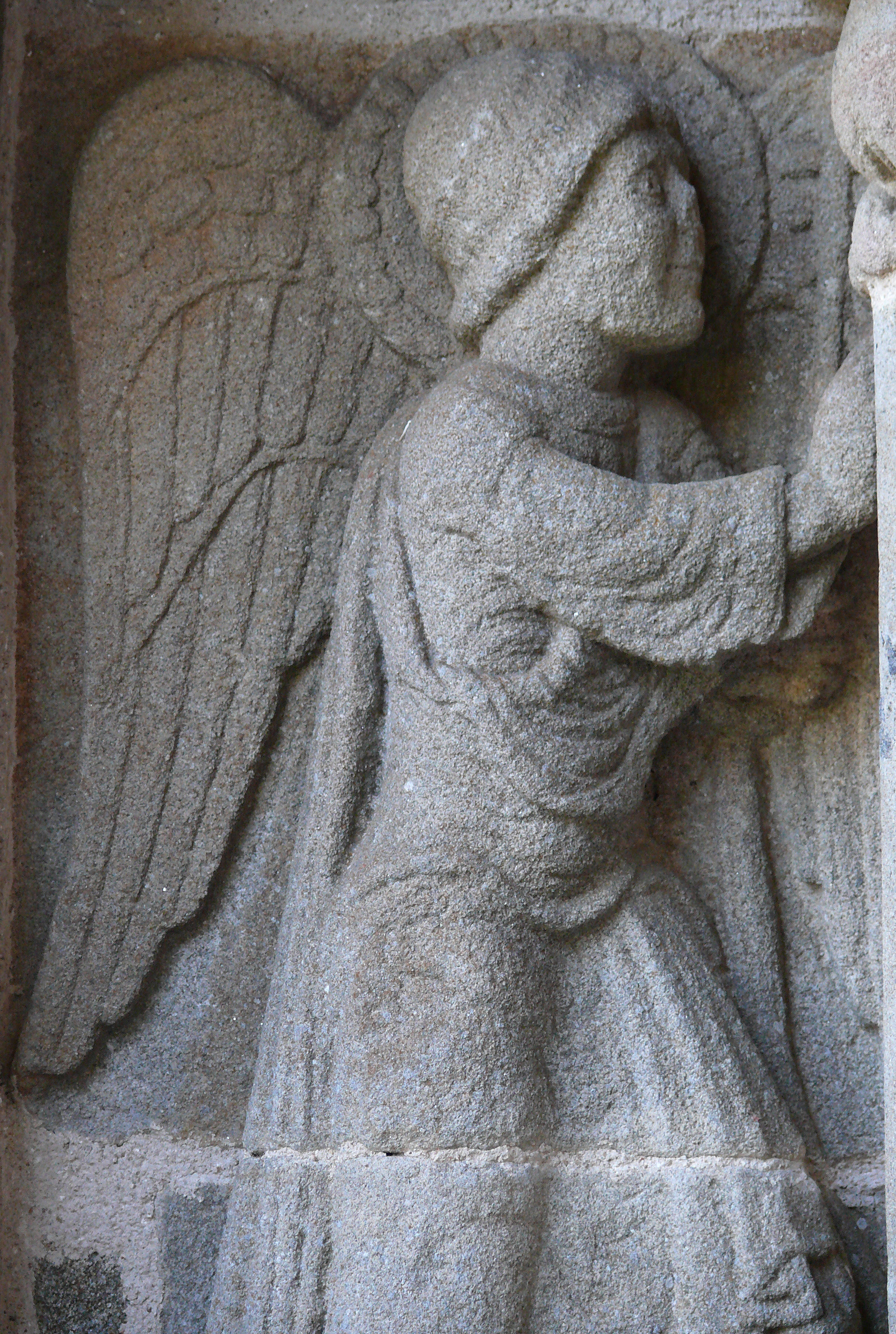
- The angel of the Annunciation, at the west porch of the church of Saint-Georges

- Coat of arms
- Location of Ydes
- Location within France Location within Auvergne-Rhône-Alpes
- Coordinates: 45°20′53″N 2°26′17″E
- Country: France
- Region: Auvergne-Rhône-Alpes
- Department: Cantal
- Arrondissement: Mauriac
- Canton: Ydes
- Intercommunality: Sumène Artense

Government
  - Mayor (2020–2026): Alain Delage
- Area^{1}: 17.36 km^{2} (6.70 sq mi)
- Highest elevation: 665 m (2,182 ft)
- Lowest elevation: 390 m (1,280 ft)
- Population (2023): 1,641
  - Density: 94.53/km^{2} (244.8/sq mi)
- Time zone: UTC+01:00 (CET)
  - Summer (DST): UTC+02:00 (CEST)
- INSEE/Postal code: 15265 /15210
- ^{1} French Land Register data, which excludes lakes, ponds, glaciers > 1 km^{2} (0.386 sq mi or 247 acres) and river estuaries.

Ydes (French pronunciation: [id]; Occitan: Ide) is a commune in the Cantal department in south-central France.

== Main sights ==
Sights include at 12th century Church of Saint-Georges d'Ydes-Bourg, in Romanesque style.

== Population ==
Historical population
Year	Pop.	±% p.a.
1968	2,037	—
1975	1,970	−0.48%
1982	1,980	+0.07%
1990	1,965	−0.10%
1999	1,931	−0.19%
2007	1,873	−0.38%
2012	1,801	−0.78%
2017	1,699	−1.16%
2023	1,641	−0.58%
Source: INSEE

== See also ==
- Communes of the Cantal department
