= Veyrières, Cantal =

Commune in Auvergne-Rhône-Alpes, France

Veyrières
- Commune
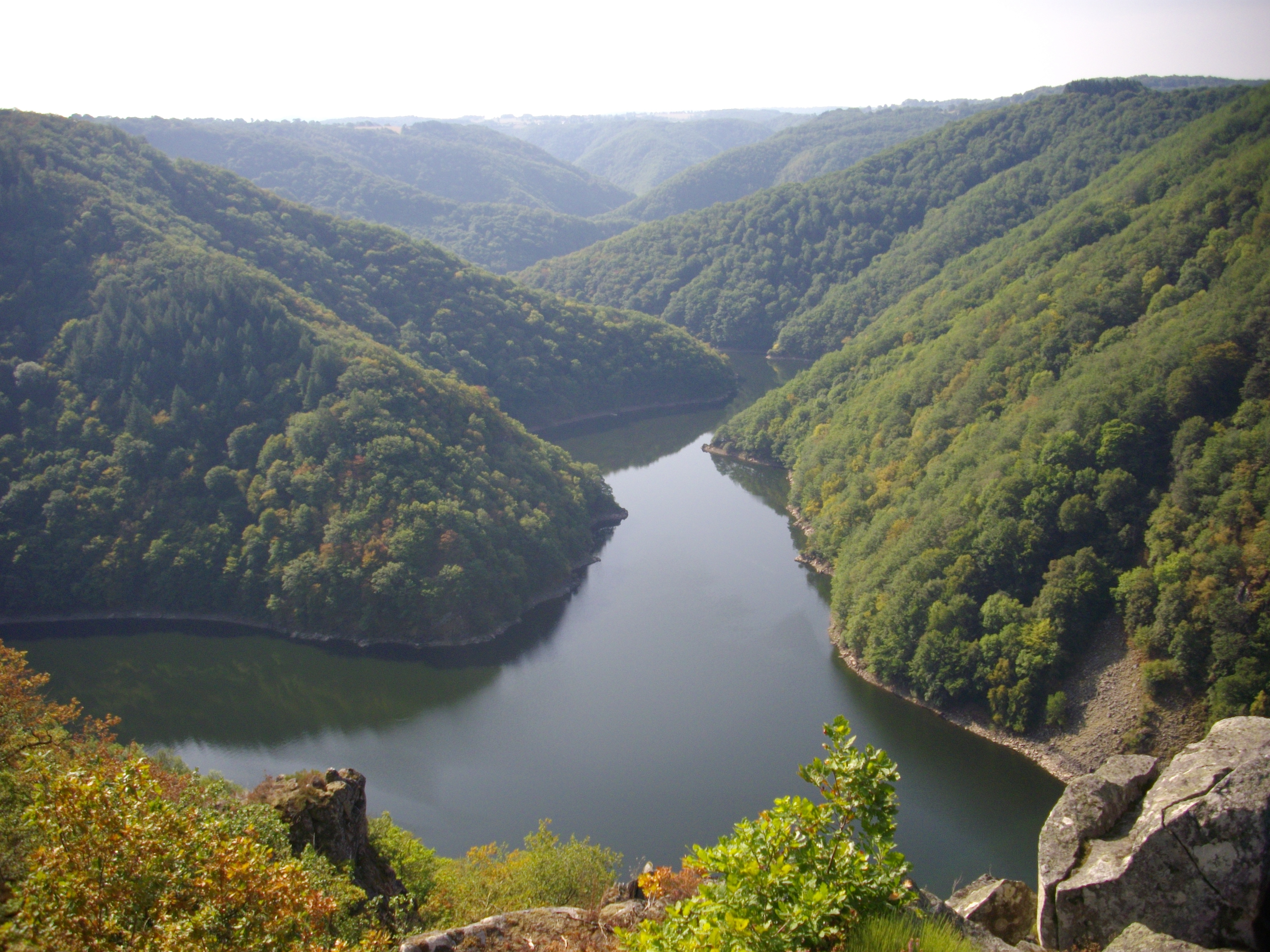
- The Sumène valley
- Location of Veyrières
- Location within France Location within Auvergne-Rhône-Alpes
- Coordinates: 45°19′55″N 2°22′30″E
- Country: France
- Region: Auvergne-Rhône-Alpes
- Department: Cantal
- Arrondissement: Mauriac
- Canton: Ydes
- Intercommunality: Sumène Artense

Government
  - Mayor (2020–2026): Catherine Maisonneuve
- Area^{1}: 13.67 km^{2} (5.28 sq mi)
- Elevation: 617 m (2,024 ft)
- Highest elevation: 675 m (2,215 ft)
- Lowest elevation: 321 m (1,053 ft)
- Population (2023): 121
  - Density: 8.85/km^{2} (22.9/sq mi)
- Time zone: UTC+01:00 (CET)
  - Summer (DST): UTC+02:00 (CEST)
- INSEE/Postal code: 15254 /15350
- ^{1} French Land Register data, which excludes lakes, ponds, glaciers > 1 km^{2} (0.386 sq mi or 247 acres) and river estuaries.

Veyrières (French pronunciation: [veʁjɛʁ]; Occitan: Veirièiras) is a commune in the Cantal department in south-central France.

== Population ==
Historical population
| Year | Pop. | ±% p.a. |
|---|---|---|
| 1968 | 228 | — |
| 1975 | 200 | −1.85% |
| 1982 | 147 | −4.30% |
| 1990 | 136 | −0.97% |
| 1999 | 116 | −1.75% |
| 2007 | 120 | +0.42% |
| 2012 | 127 | +1.14% |
| 2017 | 112 | −2.48% |
| 2023 | 121 | +1.30% |
Source: INSEE

== See also ==
- Communes of the Cantal department
