= Champagnac, Cantal =

Commune in Auvergne-Rhône-Alpes, France

Champagnac
- Commune
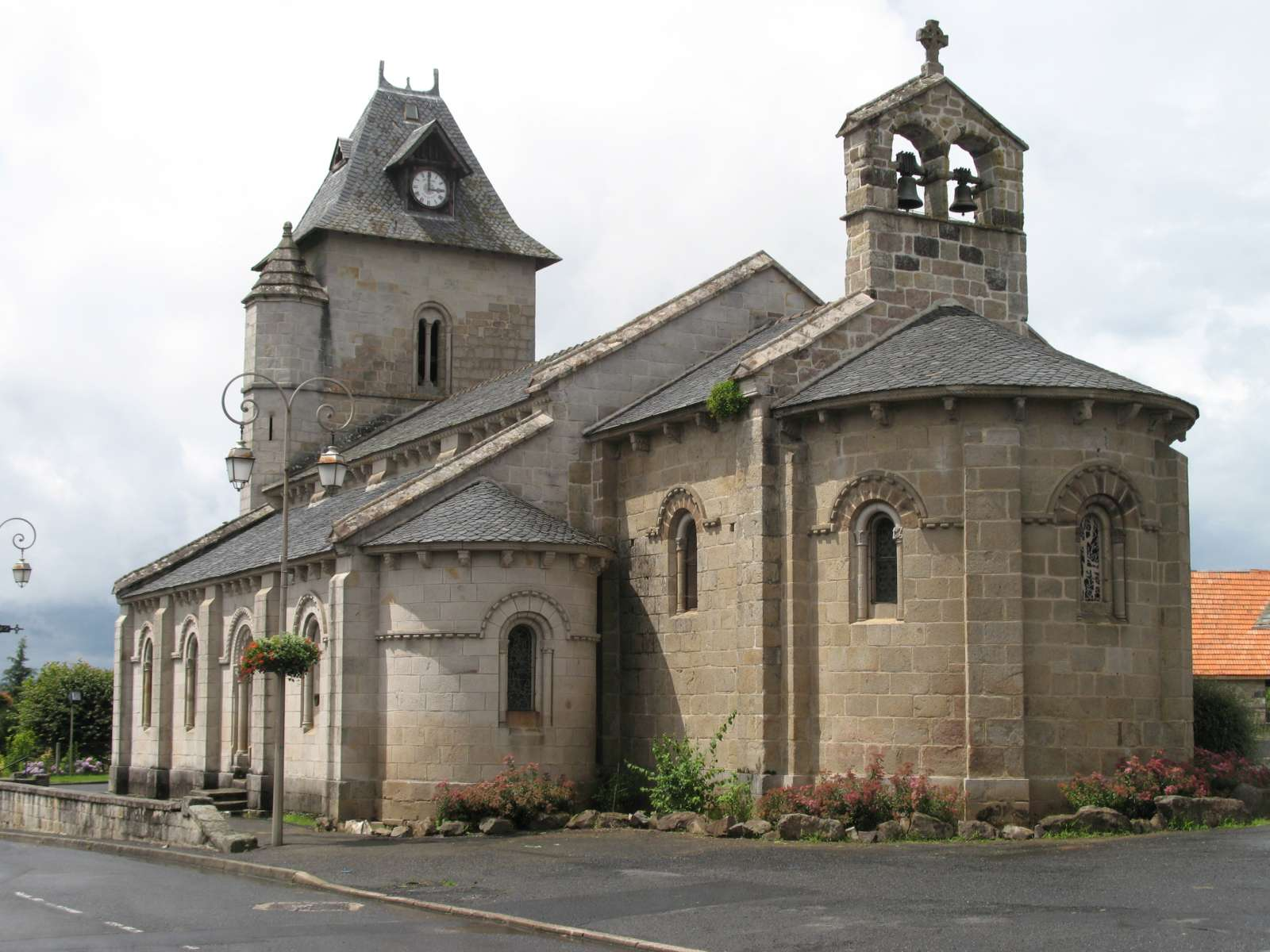
- The church of Our Lady, in Champagnac

- Coat of arms
- Location of Champagnac
- Location within France Location within Auvergne-Rhône-Alpes
- Coordinates: 45°21′27″N 2°24′01″E
- Country: France
- Region: Auvergne-Rhône-Alpes
- Department: Cantal
- Arrondissement: Mauriac
- Canton: Ydes
- Intercommunality: Sumène Artense

Government
  - Mayor (2023–2026): Gilles Rios
- Area^{1}: 28.01 km^{2} (10.81 sq mi)
- Elevation: 622 m (2,041 ft)
- Highest elevation: 697 m (2,287 ft)
- Lowest elevation: 321 m (1,053 ft)
- Population (2023): 1,020
  - Density: 36.4/km^{2} (94.3/sq mi)
- Time zone: UTC+01:00 (CET)
  - Summer (DST): UTC+02:00 (CEST)
- INSEE/Postal code: 15037 /15350
- ^{1} French Land Register data, which excludes lakes, ponds, glaciers > 1 km^{2} (0.386 sq mi or 247 acres) and river estuaries.

Champagnac (French pronunciation: [ʃɑ̃paɲak]; Occitan: Champanhac) is a commune in the Cantal department in south-central France.

== Population ==
Historical population
| Year | Pop. | ±% p.a. |
|---|---|---|
| 1968 | 1,390 | — |
| 1975 | 1,418 | +0.29% |
| 1982 | 1,382 | −0.37% |
| 1990 | 1,339 | −0.39% |
| 1999 | 1,169 | −1.50% |
| 2007 | 1,120 | −0.53% |
| 2012 | 1,028 | −1.70% |
| 2017 | 1,095 | +1.27% |
| 2023 | 1,020 | −1.18% |
Source: INSEE

== See also ==
- Communes of the Cantal department
