= Saignes, Cantal =

Commune in Auvergne-Rhône-Alpes, France

Saignes
- Commune
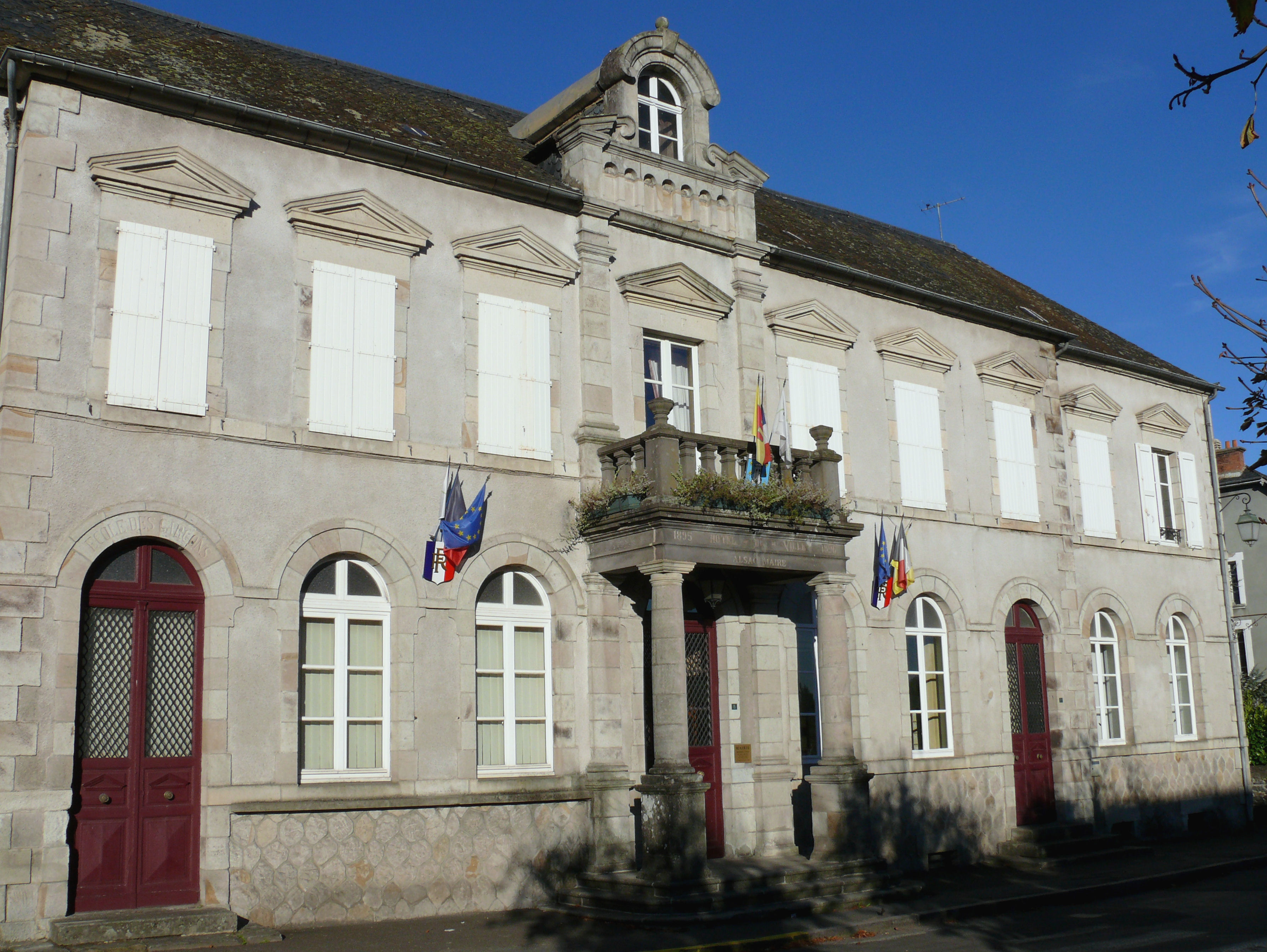
- Town hall

- Coat of arms
- Location of Saignes
- Location within France Location within Auvergne-Rhône-Alpes
- Coordinates: 45°20′08″N 2°28′48″E
- Country: France
- Region: Auvergne-Rhône-Alpes
- Department: Cantal
- Arrondissement: Mauriac
- Canton: Ydes
- Intercommunality: Sumène Artense

Government
  - Mayor (2020–2026): Éric Moulier
- Area^{1}: 6.81 km^{2} (2.63 sq mi)
- Elevation: 480 m (1,570 ft)
- Highest elevation: 780 m (2,560 ft)
- Lowest elevation: 442 m (1,450 ft)
- Population (2023): 835
  - Density: 123/km^{2} (318/sq mi)
- Time zone: UTC+01:00 (CET)
  - Summer (DST): UTC+02:00 (CEST)
- INSEE/Postal code: 15169 /15240
- ^{1} French Land Register data, which excludes lakes, ponds, glaciers > 1 km^{2} (0.386 sq mi or 247 acres) and river estuaries.

Saignes (French pronunciation: [sɛɲ]; Occitan: Sanhas) is a commune in the département of Cantal in south-central France.

== Population ==
Historical population
Year	Pop.	±% p.a.
1968	702	—
1975	735	+0.66%
1982	957	+3.84%
1990	1,009	+0.66%
1999	1,006	−0.03%
2007	896	−1.44%
2012	883	−0.29%
2017	835	−1.11%
2023	835	+0.00%
Source: INSEE

== See also ==
- Communes of the Cantal department
