= Dordogne (river) =

River in France

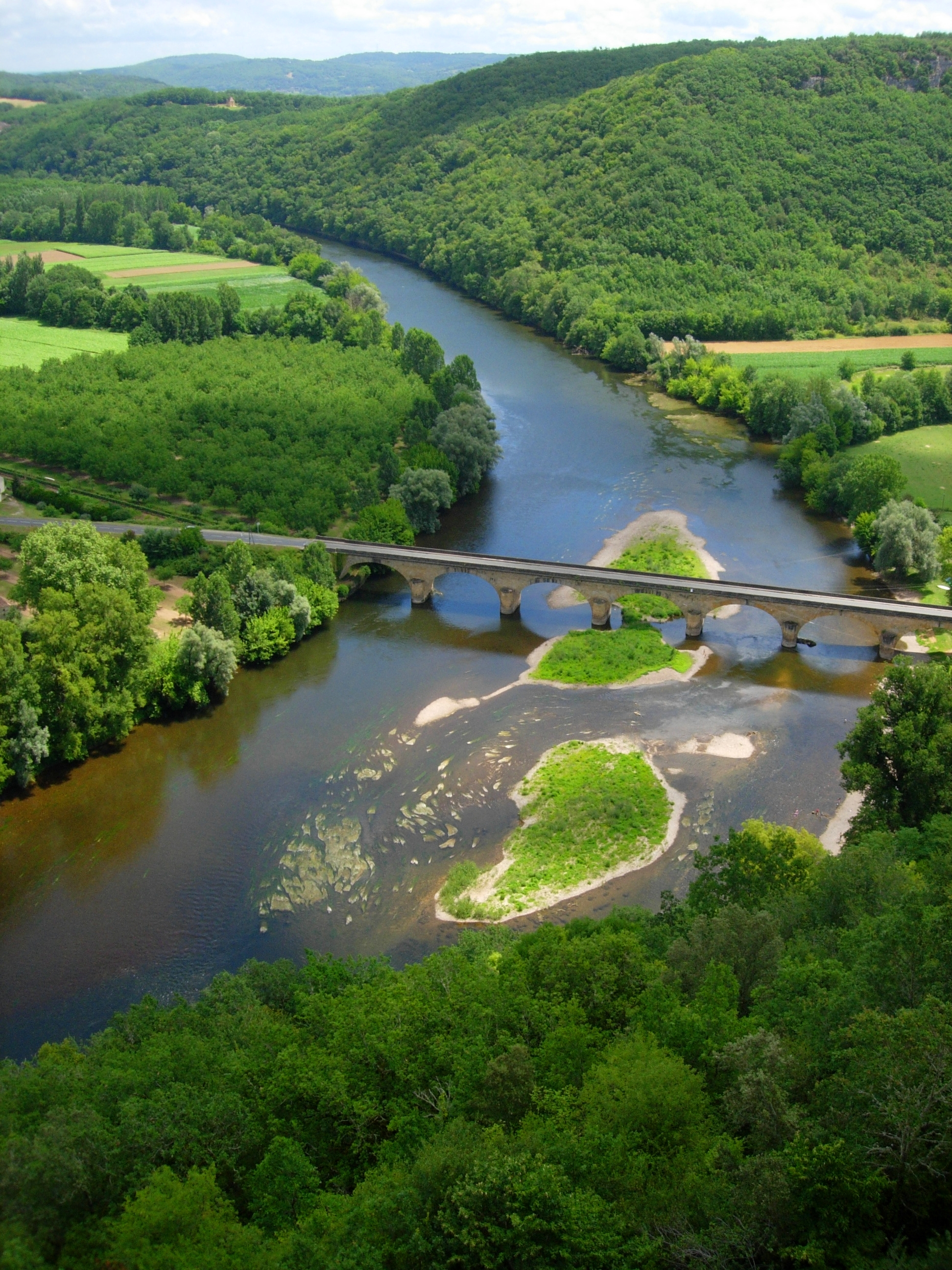
- The Dordogne in Périgord, near Castelnaud-la-Chapelle

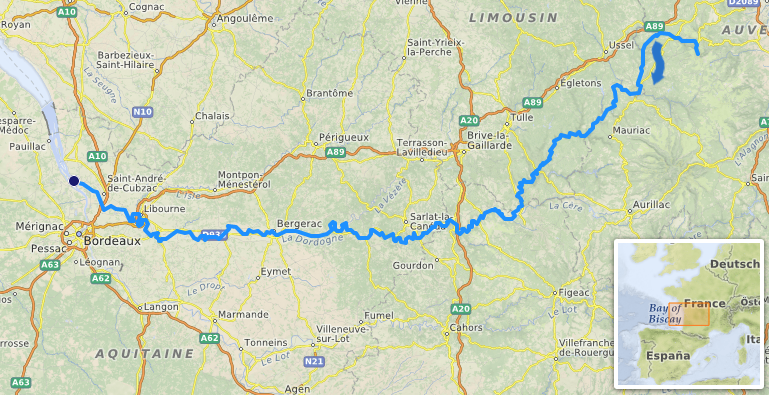
- Location of the Dordogne in France
- Native name: La Dordogne (French)

Location
- Country: France

Physical characteristics
- Source
  - location: Massif Central
  - elevation: 1,720 m (5,640 ft)
- Mouth
  - location: Gironde estuary
  - coordinates: 45°2′29″N 0°36′24″W
- Length: 483 km (300 mi)
- Basin size: 23,870 km^{2} (9,220 mi^{2})
- Discharge
  - average: 450 m^{3}/s (16,000 cu ft/s)

Basin features
- Progression: Gironde estuary→ Atlantic Ocean

The Dordogne (French pronunciation: [dɔʁdɔɲ]; Occitan: Dordonha) is a river in south-central and southwest France. It is 483.1 km (300.2 mi) long. The Dordogne and its watershed were designated Biosphere Reserve by UNESCO on 11 July 2012.

== Geography ==
The river rises on the flanks of the Puy de Sancy at 1,885 metres (6,184 ft) above sea level in the mountains of Auvergne, from the confluence of two small torrents above the town of Le Mont-Dore: the Dore (Note: Not to be confused with Dore, a tributary of the Allier.) and the Dogne. It flows generally west nearly 500 kilometres (310 mi) through the Limousin and Périgord regions before flowing into the Gironde, its common estuary with the Garonne, at the Bec d'Ambès ("Ambès beak"), north of the city of Bordeaux.

== Etymology ==
Despite appearances, the name Dordogne is not actually a portmanteau of Dore and Dogne. (Note: Unlike, for instance, the Midouze, which takes its name from its precursors, the Midou and the Douze.) The name instead comes from the ancient Durānius (Note: Sidonius Apollinaris), likely derived from Doranonia, composed from the Indo-European root *dhu‑ro‑ (from *dʰew-, "to run, flow") and two suffixes: ‑ano‑, to which ‑onia was appended.

Influenced by the suffix ‑onna, which is found in many river names, medieval forms adopted a reduplicated suffix ‑ononia: Dorononia fluvius (Note: Gregory of Tours) (6th century), Dornonia (8th century), which evolved into Dordonia (9th century) through a process of dissimilation, thus presenting the false impression of a Dore-Dogne etymology. Aimoin of Fleury is the first known author to have used the name Dordonia.

In Occitan, the river is known as Dordonha.

== Nature ==
The Dordogne is one of the few rivers in the world that exhibit the phenomenon of a tidal bore, known as a mascaret.

The upper valley of the Dordogne is a series of deep gorges. The cliffs, steep banks, fast flowing water and high bridges attract both walkers and drivers. In several places the river is dammed to form long, deep lakes. Camp sites and holiday homes have proliferated wherever the valley floor is wide enough to accommodate them.

Below Argentat and around Beaulieu-sur-Dordogne, the valley widens to accommodate fertile farmland, well-watered pasture and orchards. In the towns, which are major tourist attractions because of their history and architecture, the quaysides are lined with eating and drinking places. In Périgord, the valley widens further to encompass one of France's main gastronomic regions, with vineyards, poultry farms and truffle-rich woodlands.

The main season for tourism in the Valley of the Dordogne is from June to September, with July and August being high season. The lifestyle and culture of the Dordogne valley attract both visitors and incomers from all over France, but also from many other countries, particularly Britain and Germany.

== Course ==
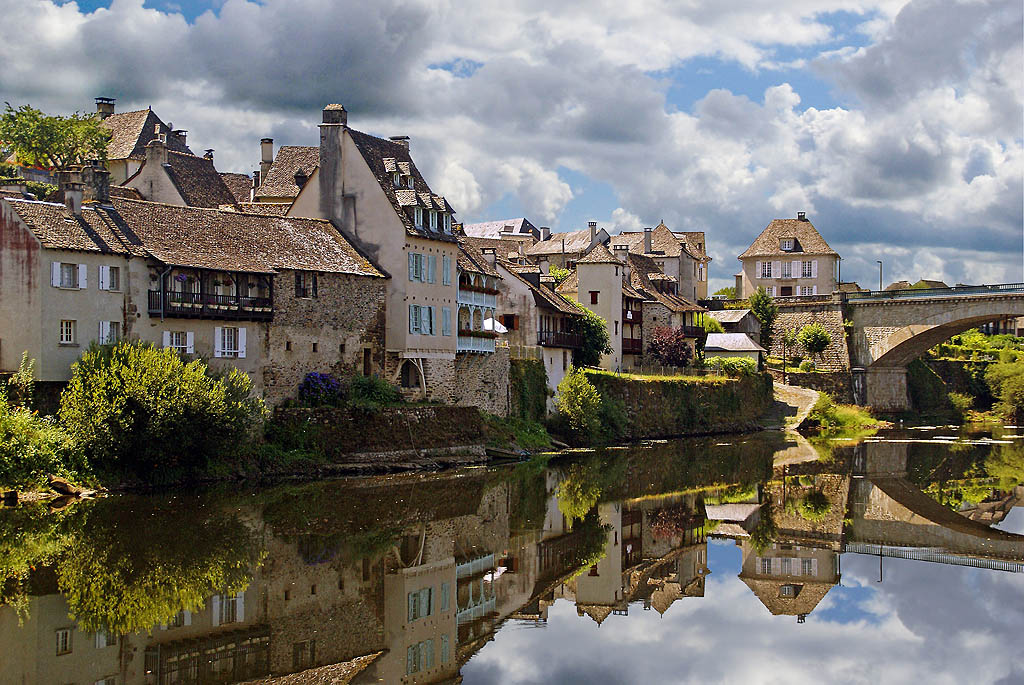
The Dordogne at Argentat in Corrèze, part of the Limousin region

The Dordogne runs through six départements and 173 communes. Some of the main towns along its course, listed by département from source to mouth, are as follows:

- Puy-de-Dôme – Le Mont-Dore (near the source of the river), La Bourboule and Saint-Sauves-d'Auvergne;
- Cantal – Lanobre and Champagnac;
- Corrèze – Bort-les-Orgues, Neuvic, Argentat and Beaulieu-sur-Dordogne;
- Lot – Bétaille, Vayrac, Martel and Souillac;
- Dordogne – Saint-Cyprien, Le Buisson-de-Cadouin, Lalinde, Mouleydier, Creysse, Bergerac, Prigonrieux and Gardonne;
- Gironde – Sainte-Foy-la-Grande, Castillon-la-Bataille, Libourne, Fronsac, Cubzac-les-Ponts, Saint-André-de-Cubzac and Bourg.

== Tributaries ==
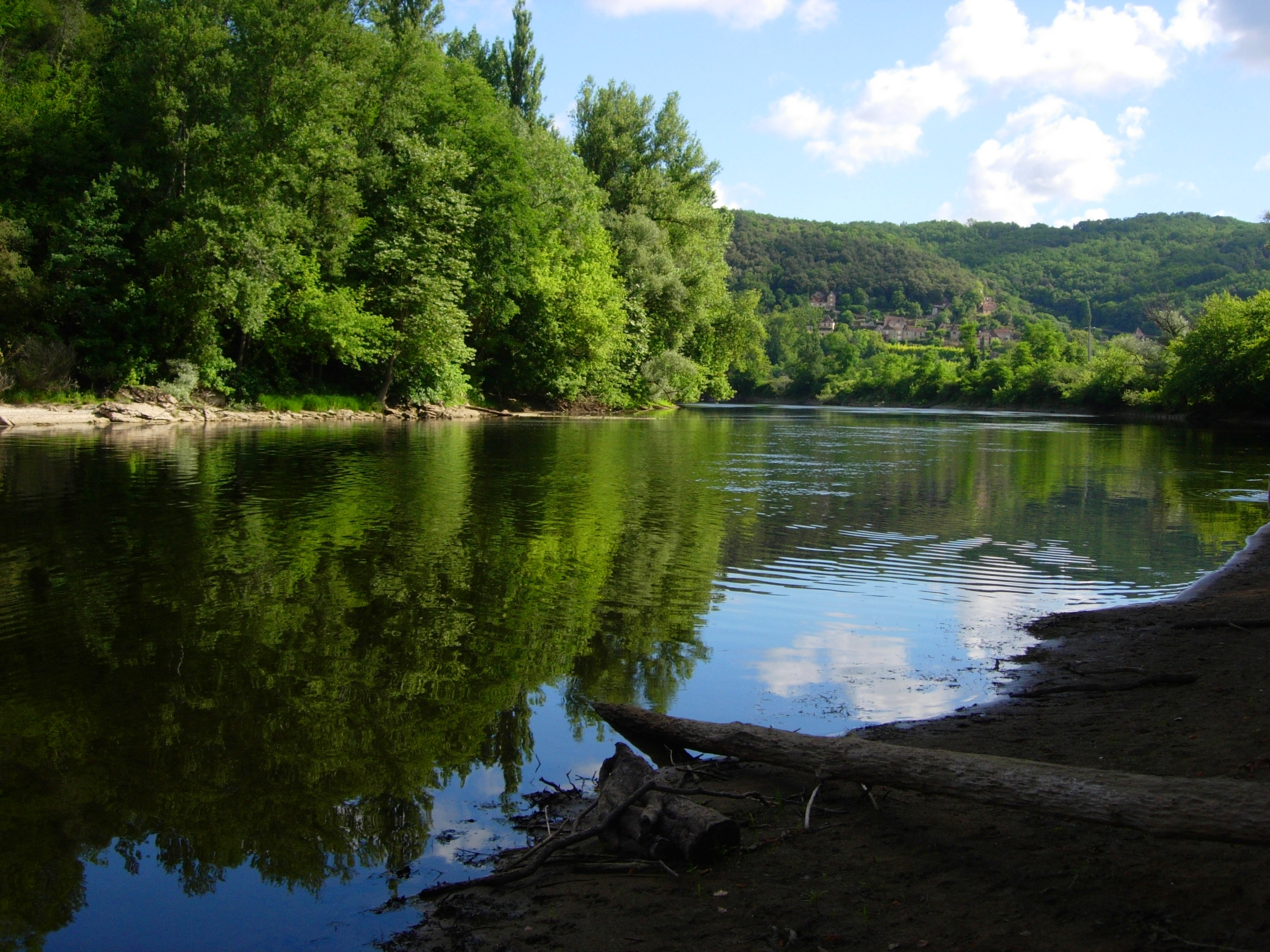
The Dordogne in the Périgord

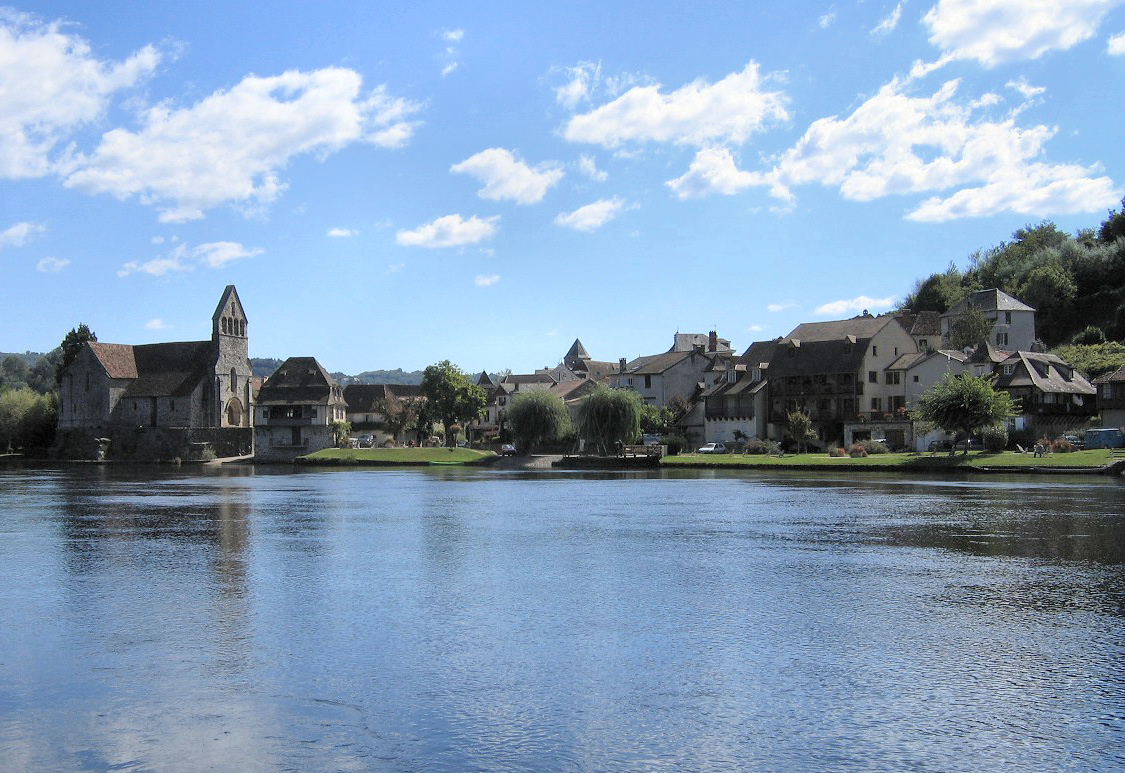
Beaulieu-sur-Dordogne and Dordogne view from Altillac

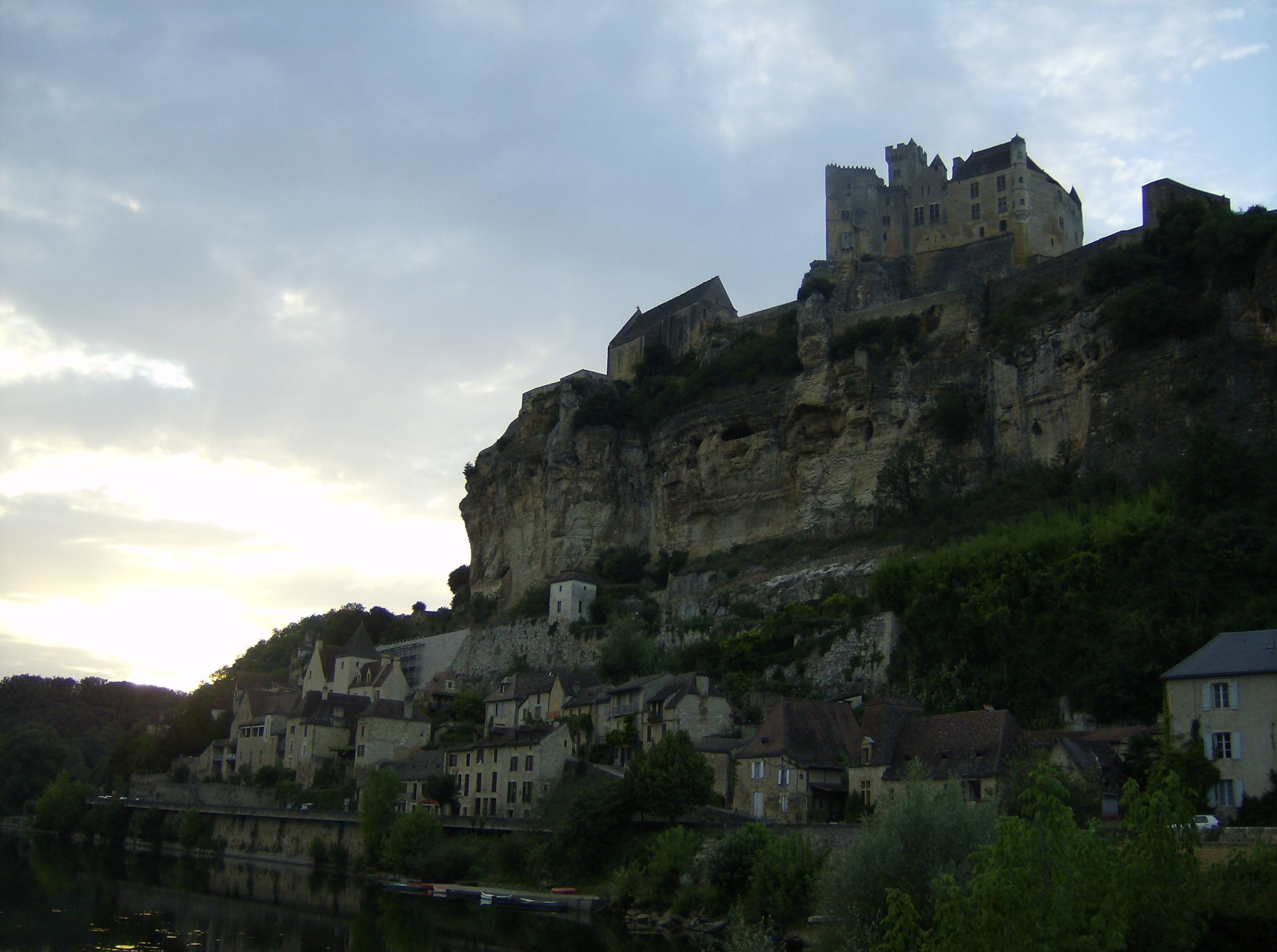
Beynac-et-Cazenac

Main tributaries from source to mouth:

- (R) Chavanon;
- (L) Rhue;
- (R) Diège;
- (L) Sumène;
- (R) Triouzoune;
- (L) Auze;
- (R) Luzège;
- (R) Doustre;
- (L) Maronne;
- (L) Cère;
- (L) Bave;
- (R) Sourdoire;
- (L) Ouysse;
- (L) Céou;
- (R) Vézère;
- (L) Couze;
- (R) Caudeau;
- (R) Lidoire;
- (R) Isle.

N.B. : (R) = right tributary; (L) = left tributary

== Activities ==
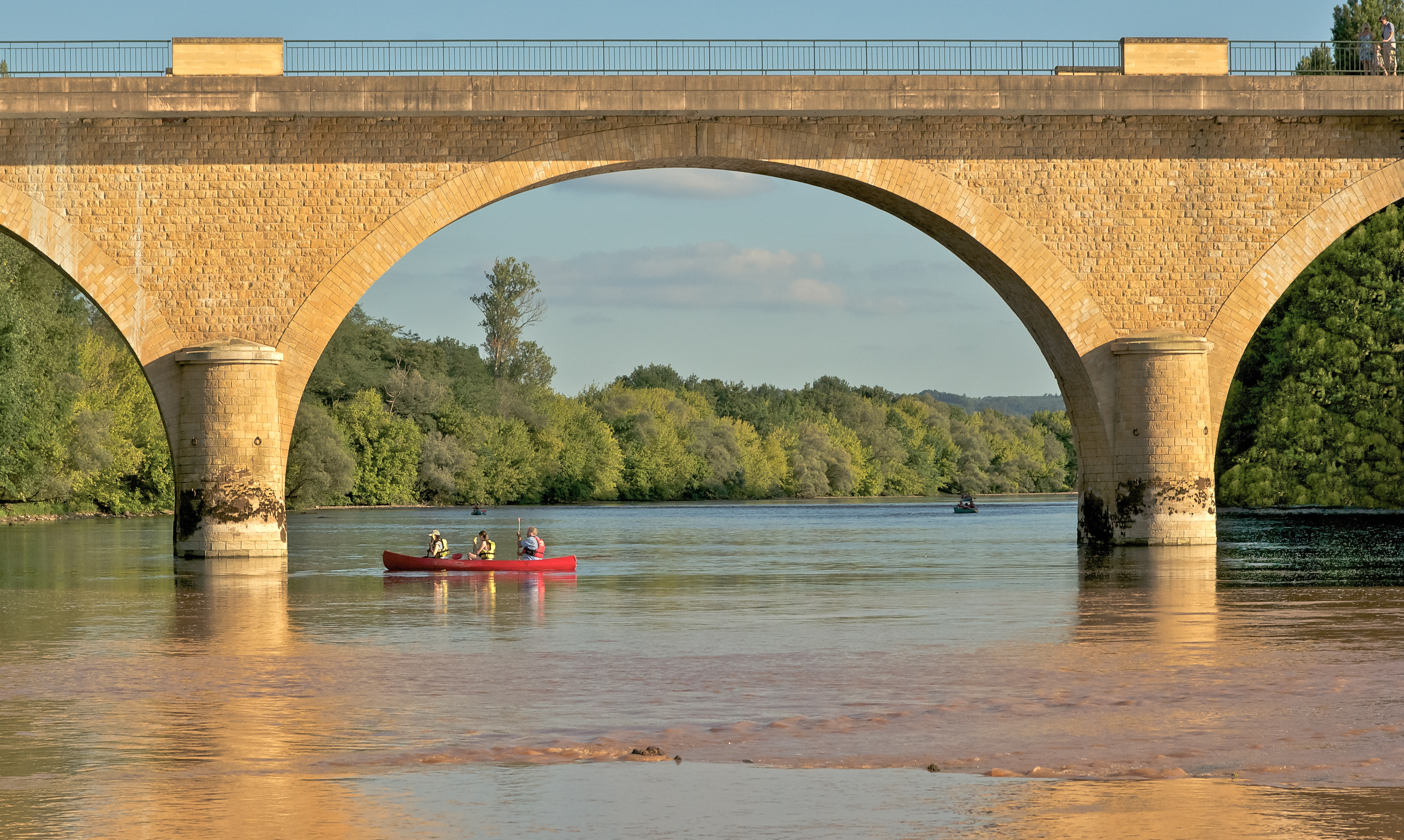
Canoeing on the Dordogne

Aside from the usual activities such as tennis and golf available in many areas of France, there are a number of water-related activities related to the Dordogne, including:

- Fishing, an age-old pastime for the locals and for visitors;
- Canoeing and kayaking, very popular (canoes & kayaks are easy to rent);
- Boating in a Gabare (a traditional skiff peculiar to the Dordogne);
- Rafting;
- Swimming;
- Motorboating;
- Sailing;
- Rowing and sculling;
- Water skiing.

== Dams ==
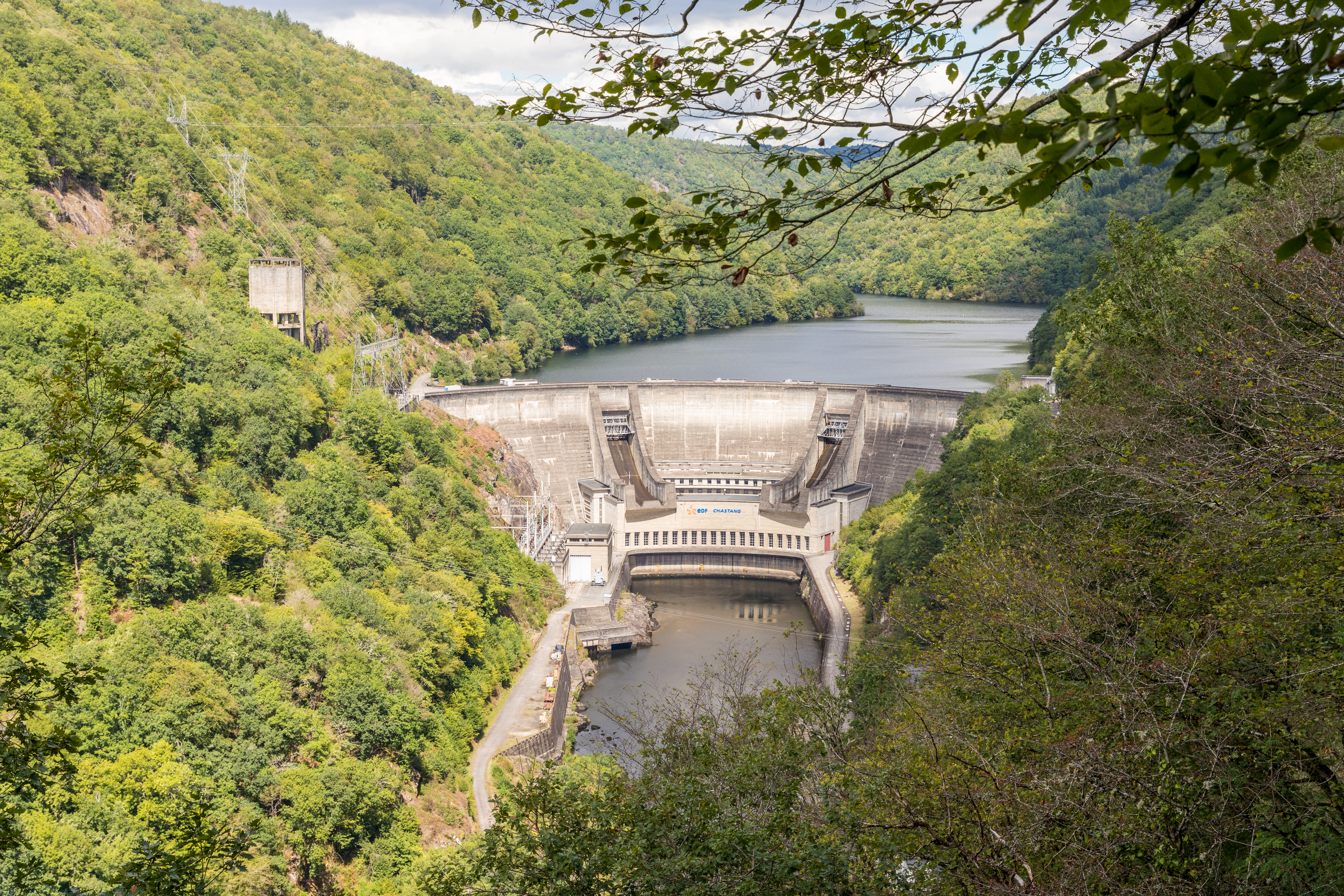
Barrage du Chastang

- Marèges Dam
- Dam at Bort-les-Orgues
- Barrage de l'Aigle (The Eagle Dam)
- Dam at Argentat
- Dam at Bergerac
- Dam at Chastang
- Dam at Mauzac
- Barrage de Tuilières
