= Agen (disambiguation) =

The commune of Agen is the prefecture of the Lot-et-Garonne department in Nouvelle-Aquitaine in southwestern France.

Agen may also refer to:

== Places ==
- Agen (meteorite), an H chondrite meteorite that fell to earth on September 5, 1814, in Aquitaine, France.
- Agen-d'Aveyron, a commune in the Aveyron department in the Occitanie region in southern France.
- Arrondissement of Agen, an arrondissement of France in the Lot-et-Garonne department in the Nouvelle Aquitaine region.
- Canton of Agen-1, an administrative division of the Lot-et-Garonne department, southwestern France
- Canton of Agen-2, an administrative division of the Lot-et-Garonne department, southwestern France
- Canton of Agen-3, an administrative division of the Lot-et-Garonne department, southwestern France
- Canton of Agen-4, an administrative division of the Lot-et-Garonne department, southwestern France.

== People ==
of Agen

- Alberta of Agen (died ca. 286), Roman venerated as a martyr and saint
- Caprasius of Agen or Saint Caprais, venerated as a Christian martyr and saint of the fourth century
- Phoebadius of Agen (died ca. 392), Catholic bishop of the fourth century
- William II of Agen (also known as Guillaume d'Agen), Latin Patriarch of Jerusalem in 1261–1270

surname

- Addison Agen, American singer, runner up in season 13 of American The Voice
- James H. Agen (1847–1921), American businessman and politician

== Others ==
- SU Agen Lot-et-Garonne, French rugby union club based in Agen
- Agender, a term used by individuals who identify with no gender
