= Hôtel de Ville, Agen =

Town hall in Agen, France

Hôtel de Ville
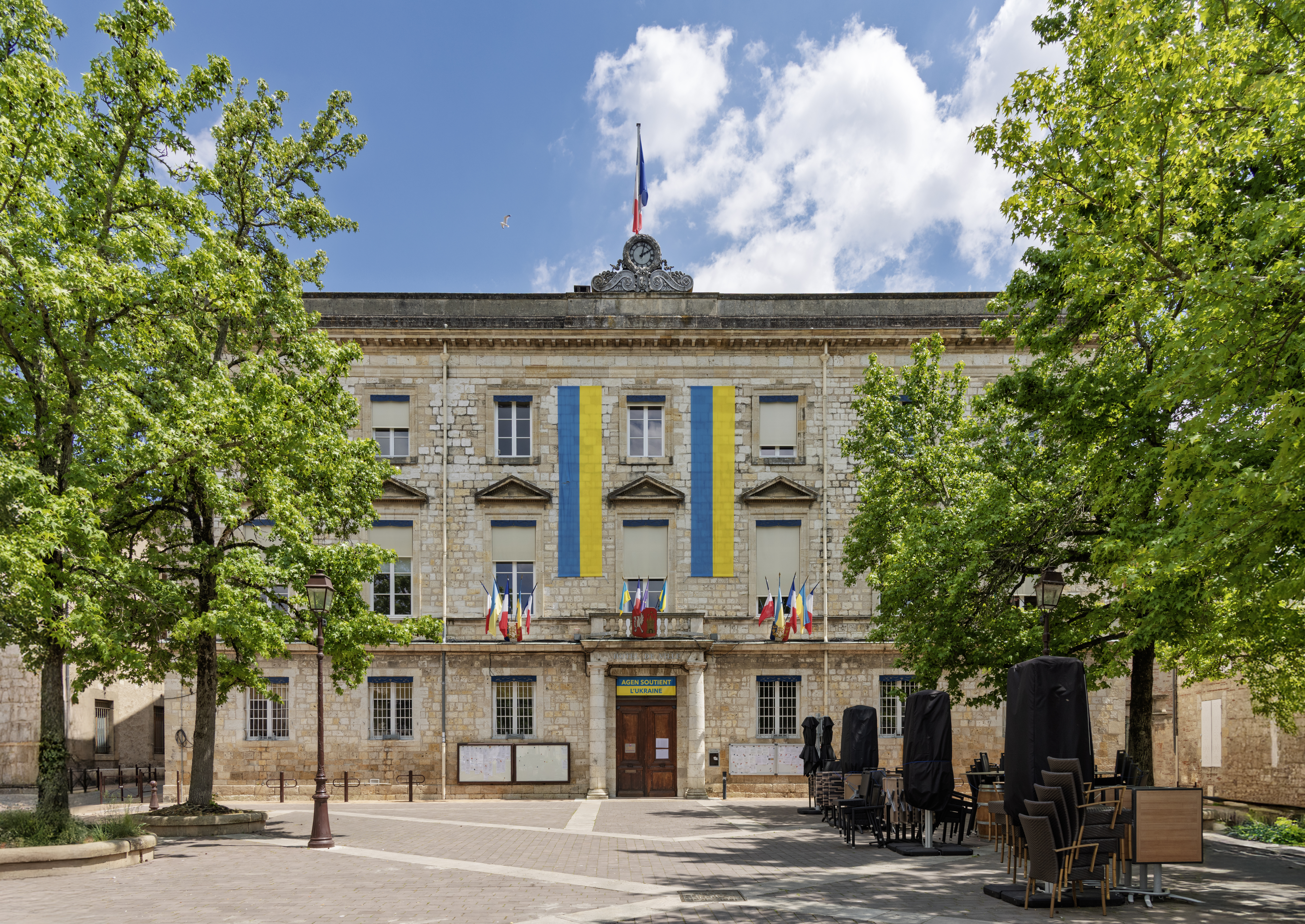
- The main frontage of the Hôtel de Ville in May 2022
- Interactive map of the Hôtel de Ville area

General information
- Type: City hall
- Architectural style: Neoclassical style
- Location: Agen, France
- Coordinates: 44.2031°N 0.6162°E
- Completed: 1666

The Hôtel de Ville (French pronunciation: [otɛl də vil], City Hall) is a municipal building in Agen, Lot-et-Garonne, in southwestern France, standing on Place du Docteur Esquirol.

== History ==
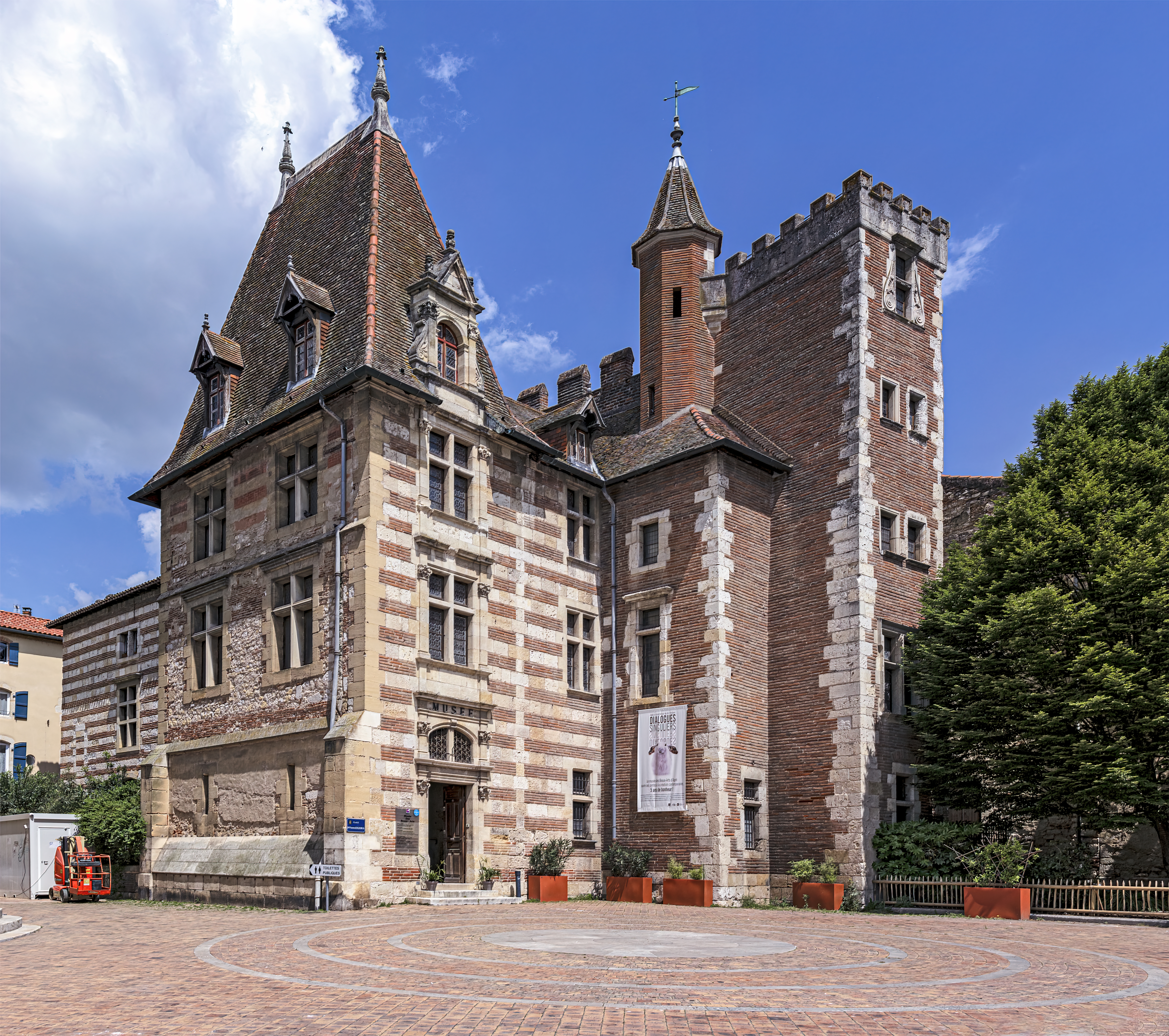
The Hôtel d'Estrades (now the Musée des Beaux-Arts d'Agen), which served as the third town hall

The consuls of Agen originally met in a building near the former Cathedral of Saint-Étienne, probably on the corner of Rue de la Grande-Horloge and Rue des Cornières. A gateway across the Rue de la Grande-Horloge served as a belfry and a clock and a bell, used to warn the residents at a time of crisis, were installed there in 1498. By the mid-16th century, the consuls had relocated to a new building, the second town hall, which was described as being to the west of the Hôtel d'Estrades (now the Musée des Beaux-Arts d'Agen).

After the French Revolution, the new town council used the Hôtel d'Estrades as their meeting place. This building was designed in the medieval style, built in rubble masonry and dated back at least to the early 17th century. It served as the home of Godefroi, Comte d'Estrades until it was acquired by the consuls in 1658. It then became known as the Maison du Roi (Kings House) and was used as the residence of visiting dignitaries before becoming the third town hall.

In the mid-19th century, the council decided to relocate to the current building. The site had originally been occupied by the Château de Monrevel, which had formed part of the ancient defences of the city. In the mid-17th century, the local intendant, Claude Pellott, ordered the demolition of the château and the construction of a new courthouse for the presidial court. The new courthouse was designed in the neoclassical style, built in rubble masonry and was completed in around 1666. After the judicial services relocated to a new courthouse on Place Armand-Fallières, the former presidial courthouse became the fourth town hall in 1869.

The design involved a symmetrical main frontage of seven bays facing onto what is now Place du Docteur Esquirol. The central bay featured a porch formed by a pair of Doric order columns supporting an entablature and a balcony. The building was fenestrated by casement windows with stone surrounds in the other bays on the ground floor, by casement windows with stone surrounds and pediments on the first floor, and by casement windows with stone surrounds on the second floor. At roof level, there was a modillioned cornice and a parapet and, above the central bay, there was a clock supported by scrolls. Internally, the principal room was the Salle du Conseil (council chamber) which, after it was decorated by fine paintings by Antoine Calbet and Henri Loubat, became the Salle des Illustres (Room of Famous People) in March 1885.

The paintings depict the craftsman, Bernard Palissy, the religious teacher, Joseph Justus Scaliger, the soldier, Godefroi, Comte d'Estrades, the physicist, Jacques de Romas, the politician, Pierre Sylvain Dumon, the veterinary specialist, Ferdinand Laulanié, the statesman, Jean-Gérard Lacuée, count of Cessac, the naturalist, Bernard Germain de Lacépède, the soldier, Jean-Baptiste Cyrus de Valence, the poet, Jacques Jasmin, and the philosopher, Charles Louis de Secondat, baron de La Brède et de Montesquieu.

During the liberation of the town on 19 August 1944, part of the Second World War, members of the French Resistance seized the town hall and installed a committee there to restore normal services. A major programme of works, involving the restoration of the Salle des Illustres, was completed in October 2018.
