= Mercœur =

Mercœur may refer to the following places in France:

- Mercœur, Corrèze, a commune in the department of Corrèze
- Mercœur, Haute-Loire, a commune in the department of Haute-Loire

Or to the

- Duke of Mercœur
