= La Garenne =

La Garenne may refer to:

- Agen La Garenne Airport, an airport located near Agen in the Lot-et-Garonne department
- a former suburb of Colombes, now La Garenne-Colombes, a commune in the northwestern suburbs of Paris, France
- a lieu-dit part of the Vix Grave, a place around the village of Vix in northern Burgundy, France
