= Le Passage, Lot-et-Garonne =

Le Passage
- Commune
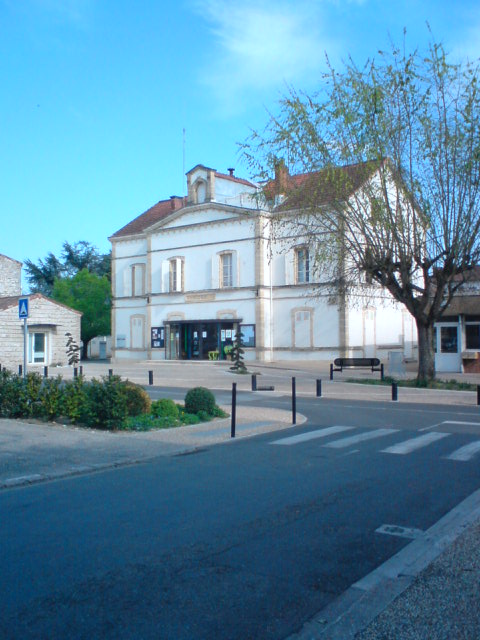
- The town hall in Le Passage

- Coat of arms
- Location of Le Passage
- Location within France Location within Nouvelle-Aquitaine
- Coordinates: 44°12′09″N 0°36′15″E
- Country: France
- Region: Nouvelle-Aquitaine
- Department: Lot-et-Garonne
- Arrondissement: Agen
- Canton: Agen-4
- Intercommunality: Agglomération d'Agen

Government
  - Mayor (2020–2026): Francis Garcia
- Area^{1}: 12.89 km^{2} (4.98 sq mi)
- Elevation: 50 m (160 ft)
- Highest elevation: 110 m (360 ft)
- Lowest elevation: 36 m (118 ft)
- Population (2023): 9,326
  - Density: 723.5/km^{2} (1,874/sq mi)
- Demonym: Passageois(es)
- Time zone: UTC+01:00 (CET)
  - Summer (DST): UTC+02:00 (CEST)
- INSEE/Postal code: 47201 /47520
- ^{1} French Land Register data, which excludes lakes, ponds, glaciers > 1 km^{2} (0.386 sq mi or 247 acres) and river estuaries.

Le Passage (French pronunciation: [lə pasaʒ]; Occitan: Lo Passatge) is a commune in the Lot-et-Garonne department in south-western France. It is part of the agglomeration of Agen.

The Agen - La Garenne Aerodrome is located in Le Passage.

== Population ==
Historical population
| Year | Pop. | ±% p.a. |
|---|---|---|
| 1968 | 6,746 | — |
| 1975 | 7,862 | +2.21% |
| 1982 | 8,553 | +1.21% |
| 1990 | 8,875 | +0.46% |
| 1999 | 8,827 | −0.06% |
| 2007 | 9,324 | +0.69% |
| 2012 | 9,380 | +0.12% |
| 2017 | 9,561 | +0.38% |
| 2023 | 9,326 | −0.41% |
Source: INSEE

== Twin towns ==
Le Passage is twinned with:

- Consuegra, Spain
- Włoszczowa, Poland

== See also ==
- Communes of the Lot-et-Garonne department
