= Francés de Corteta =

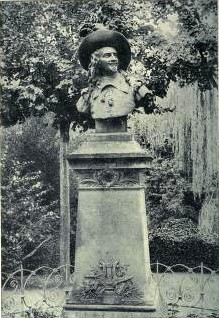
Bust offered by the parisian félibres, Agen (destroyed dsince)

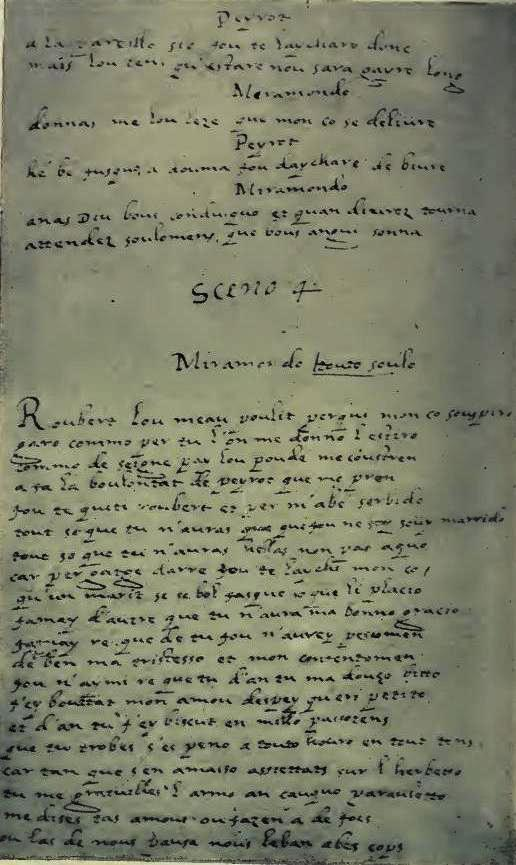
Cortète's manuscript

Francés de Corteta, also known as Corteta de Prades (in French François de Cortète and Cortète de Prades; Agen, 1586 – Hautefage, September 3, 1667) was a nobleman from the Agen province and an Occitan-language poet and baroque play writer.

== Biography ==
François de Cortète was born to a noble family, his father, Jean-Jacques de Cortète, was governor of Castelculier. He studied in Agen and served in Adrien de Montluc's army. In 1608, he married Jeanne de Caumont and in 1614 he retired in Agen where he wrote his plays, which remained unpublished until his death. One of his sons published them for the first time.

== Playwright ==
He is the author of three comedies in Occitan:

- Ramonet, o Lo paisan agenés, tornat de la guerra which deals with the topos of the gascon miles gloriosus.
- Miramonda, a pastoral comedy.
- Sancho Pança, al palais dels Ducs a play based on Don Quixote's Dukes episode.

== Bibliography ==
- Cortète's editions:
  - Ratier, Charles. Œuvres de François de Cortète. Agen: Imprimerie Moderne, 1915. Corteta's works on Archive.org
- Critics:
  - Garavina, Fausta. La letteratura occitanica moderna. Bologna: Sansoni, 1970.
  - Gardy, Philippe. Histoire et anthologie de la littérature occitane, Tome II, l'âge du baroque – 1520 -1789. Montpellier: Presse du languedoc, 1997.
  - Anatole, Cristian – Lafont, Robert. Nouvelle histoire de la littérature occitane. Paris: P.U.F., 1970.
