= Bon-Encontre =

- Commune
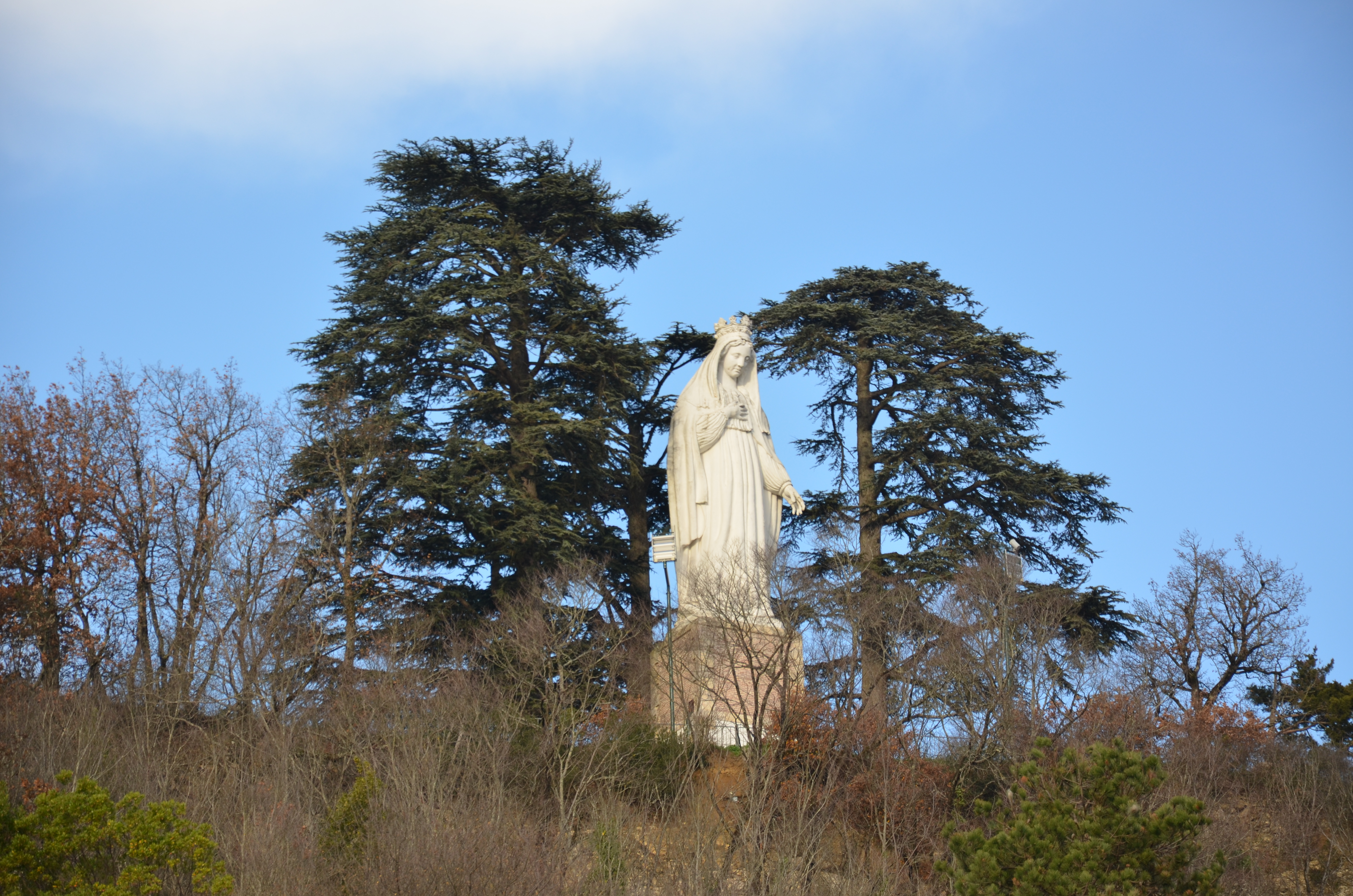
- The statue of the Virgin, in Bon-Encontre
- Location of Bon-Encontre
- Location within France Location within Nouvelle-Aquitaine
- Coordinates: 44°11′14″N 0°40′22″E
- Country: France
- Region: Nouvelle-Aquitaine
- Department: Lot-et-Garonne
- Arrondissement: Agen
- Canton: Agen-2
- Intercommunality: Agglomération d'Agen

Government
  - Mayor (2020–2026): Laurence Lamy
- Area^{1}: 20.56 km^{2} (7.94 sq mi)
- Elevation: 80 m (260 ft)
- Highest elevation: 209 m (686 ft)
- Lowest elevation: 48 m (157 ft)
- Population (2023): 6,530
  - Density: 318/km^{2} (823/sq mi)
- Time zone: UTC+01:00 (CET)
  - Summer (DST): UTC+02:00 (CEST)
- INSEE/Postal code: 47032 /47240
- ^{1} French Land Register data, which excludes lakes, ponds, glaciers > 1 km^{2} (0.386 sq mi or 247 acres) and river estuaries.

Bon-Encontre (French pronunciation: [bɔ.n‿ɑ̃kɔ̃tʁ]; Occitan: Bonencontre) is a commune in the Lot-et-Garonne department in southwestern France.

== Population ==
Historical population

Year	Pop.	±% p.a.
1800	1,361	—
1806	1,607	+2.81%
1821	1,555	−0.22%
1831	1,646	+0.57%
1836	1,700	+0.65%
1841	1,535	−2.02%
1846	1,535	+0.00%
1851	1,579	+0.57%
1856	1,455	−1.62%
1861	1,322	−1.90%
1866	1,486	+2.37%
1872	1,397	−1.02%
1876	1,370	−0.49%
1881	1,301	−1.03%
1886	1,275	−0.40%
1891	1,279	+0.06%
1896	1,251	−0.44%
1901	1,189	−1.01%

Year	Pop.	±% p.a.
1906	1,156	−0.56%
1911	1,186	+0.51%
1921	1,045	−1.26%
1926	1,208	+2.94%
1931	1,291	+1.34%
1936	1,531	+3.47%
1946	1,633	+0.65%
1954	1,867	+1.69%
1962	2,600	+4.23%
1968	3,177	+3.40%
1975	3,853	+2.79%
1982	4,462	+2.12%
1990	5,362	+2.32%
1999	5,759	+0.80%
2007	5,936	+0.38%
2012	6,182	+0.82%
2017	6,199	+0.05%
2023	6,530	+0.87%

Source: EHESS and INSEE (1968–2023)

== See also ==
- Communes of the Lot-et-Garonne department
