= Sexcles =

- Commune
- Coat of arms
- Location of Sexcles
- Location within France Location within Nouvelle-Aquitaine
- Coordinates: 45°02′52″N 2°00′32″E
- Country: France
- Region: Nouvelle-Aquitaine
- Department: Corrèze
- Arrondissement: Tulle
- Canton: Argentat-sur-Dordogne

Government
  - Mayor (2020–2026): Thierry da Fonseca
- Area^{1}: 25.91 km^{2} (10.00 sq mi)
- Elevation: 450 m (1,480 ft)
- Highest elevation: 623 m (2,044 ft)
- Lowest elevation: 200 m (660 ft)
- Population (2023): 228
  - Density: 8.80/km^{2} (22.8/sq mi)
- Time zone: UTC+01:00 (CET)
  - Summer (DST): UTC+02:00 (CEST)
- INSEE/Postal code: 19259 /19430
- ^{1} French Land Register data, which excludes lakes, ponds, glaciers > 1 km^{2} (0.386 sq mi or 247 acres) and river estuaries.

Sexcles (French pronunciation: [sɛkl]; Occitan: Sescles) is a commune in the Corrèze department in central France.

== Geography ==
The Maronne river forms all of the commune's northern boundary.

== Population ==
Historical population
Year	Pop.	±% p.a.
1968	428	—
1975	382	−1.61%
1982	305	−3.16%
1990	257	−2.12%
1999	239	−0.80%
2007	223	−0.86%
2012	229	+0.53%
2017	234	+0.43%
2023	228	−0.43%
Source: INSEE

== See also ==
- Communes of the Corrèze department
