= Maronne =

River in central France

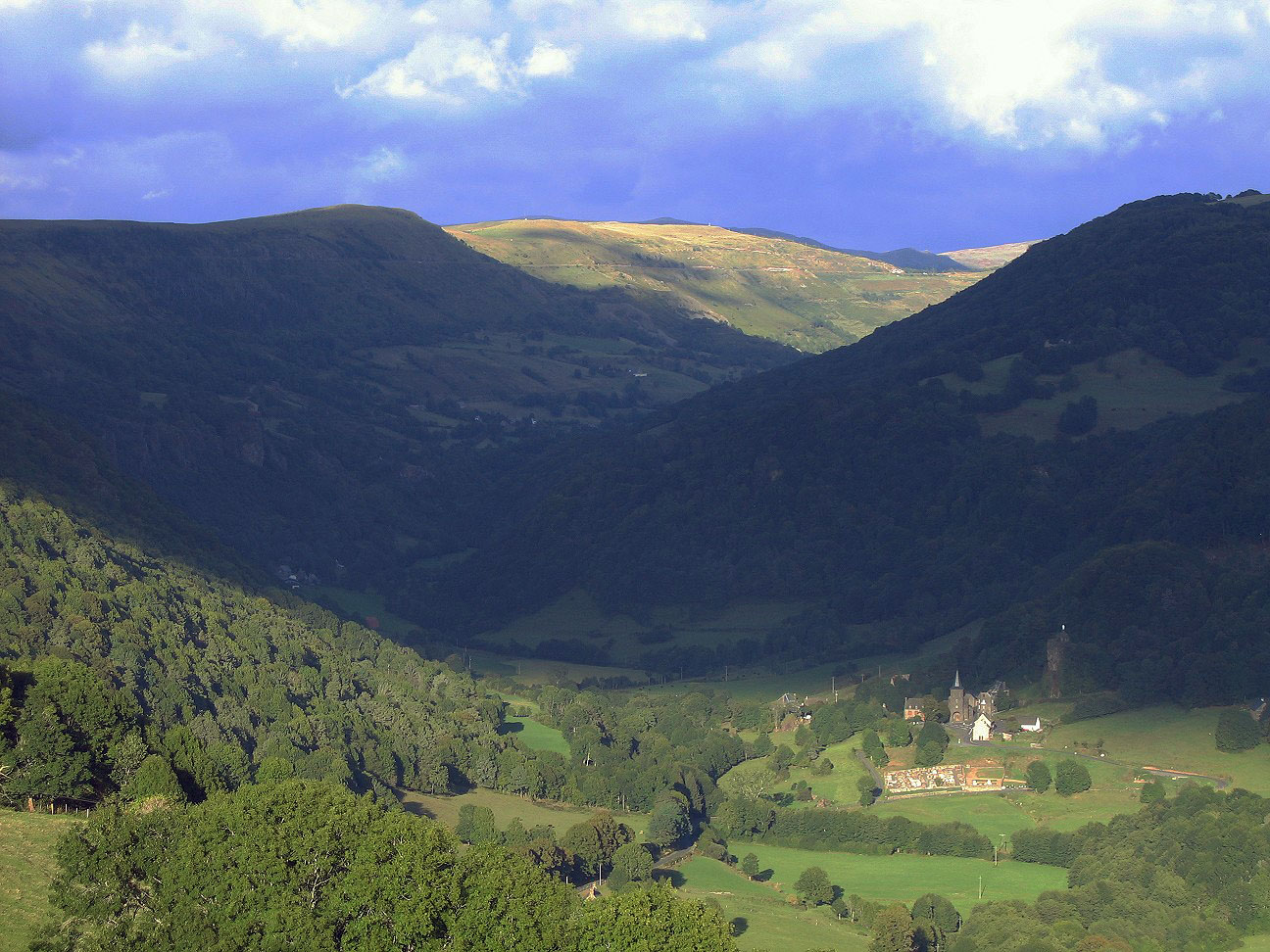

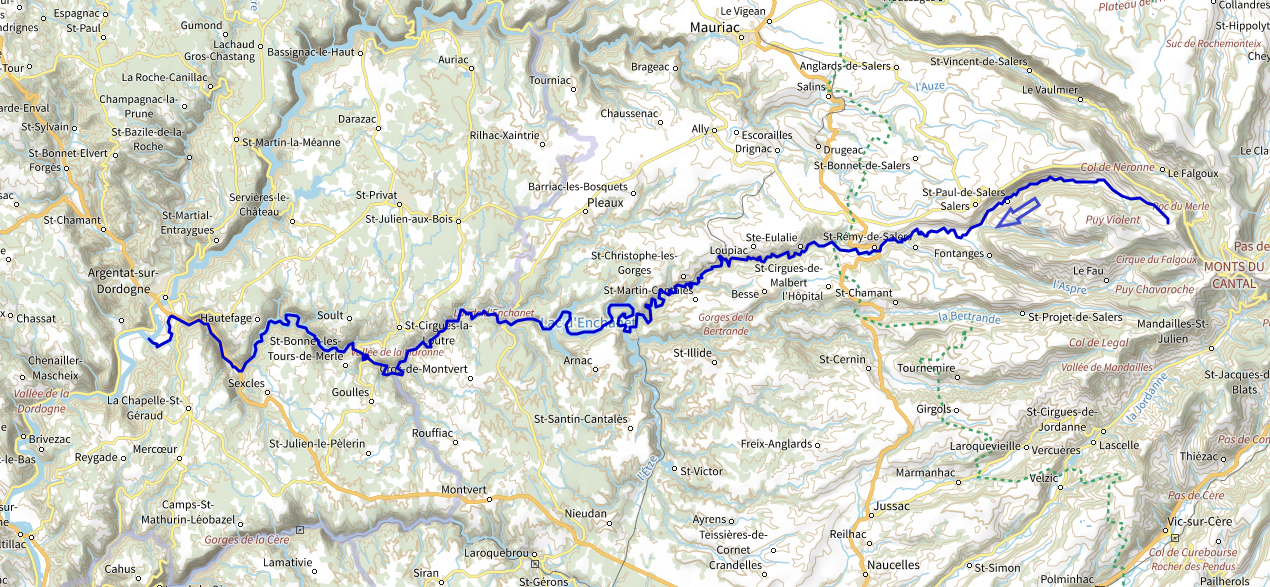

Location
- Country: France

Physical characteristics
- Source
  - location: Saint-Paul-de-Salers
  - coordinates: 45°08′32″N 02°35′44″E
  - elevation: 1,050 m (3,440 ft)
- Mouth
  - location: Dordogne
  - coordinates: 45°04′21″N 01°55′39″E
  - elevation: 165 m (541 ft)
- Length: 92.6 km (57.5 mi)
- Basin size: 821 km^{2} (317 sq mi)
- Discharge
  - average: 20.3 m^{3}/s (720 cu ft/s)

Basin features
- Progression: Dordogne→ Gironde estuary→ Atlantic Ocean

The Maronne (French pronunciation: [maʁɔn]) is a 92.6-kilometre (57.5 mi) long river in the Cantal and Corrèze departments in south central France. Its source is several small streams joining near Récusset, a hamlet in Saint-Paul-de-Salers. It flows generally west. It is a left tributary of the Dordogne, into which it flows between Argentat and Monceaux-sur-Dordogne.

== Departments and communes along its course ==
This list is ordered from source to mouth:

- Cantal: Saint-Paul-de-Salers, Fontanges, Saint-Martin-Valmeroux, Sainte-Eulalie, Besse, Pleaux, Saint-Martin-Cantalès, Arnac,
- Corrèze: Saint-Julien-aux-Bois
- Cantal: Cros-de-Montvert,
- Corrèze: Saint-Cirgues-la-Loutre,
- Cantal: Rouffiac,
- Corrèze: Saint-Geniez-ô-Merle, Goulles, Saint-Bonnet-les-Tours-de-Merle, Sexcles, Hautefage, Mercœur, La Chapelle-Saint-Géraud, Argentat and Monceaux-sur-Dordogne
