= Union de Pharmacologie Scientifique Appliquée =

French pharmaceutical group

The Union de pharmacologie scientifique appliquée (UPSA) is a French pharmaceutical group, independent from 1935 until acquisition by Bristol Myers Squibb in 1994. The company is now owned by Taisho Pharmaceutical.

== History ==
It was founded in Agen in 1935 by Dr Camille Bru. Following the founder's death in 1958 the group was run by his son Jean Bru until his own death 1989, and then by Jean Bru's widow Nicole Bru, née Magniez, from 1989 to 1994. The Fondation Bru administers the charitable and cultural interests of the family.

In December 2018, Bristol-Myers announced the sale of UPSA to the Japanese group Taisho Pharmaceutical for $1.6 billion. Taisho is the largest OTC drug company in Japan and the eighth largest in the world.

On July 1, 2019, the sale of UPSA to Taisho Pharmaceutical is finalized. However, UPSA retains its status as a company and its flagship brands remain manufactured in France on its site.
