= Goulles =

- Commune
- Coat of arms
- Location of Goulles
- Location within France Location within Nouvelle-Aquitaine
- Coordinates: 45°02′36″N 2°04′50″E
- Country: France
- Region: Nouvelle-Aquitaine
- Department: Corrèze
- Arrondissement: Tulle
- Canton: Argentat-sur-Dordogne

Government
  - Mayor (2026–32): Adrien Chièze
- Area^{1}: 33.4 km^{2} (12.9 sq mi)
- Elevation: 550 m (1,800 ft)
- Highest elevation: 624 m (2,047 ft)
- Lowest elevation: 278 m (912 ft)
- Population (2023): 323
  - Density: 9.67/km^{2} (25.0/sq mi)
- Time zone: UTC+01:00 (CET)
  - Summer (DST): UTC+02:00 (CEST)
- INSEE/Postal code: 19086 /19430
- ^{1} French Land Register data, which excludes lakes, ponds, glaciers > 1 km^{2} (0.386 sq mi or 247 acres) and river estuaries.

Goulles (French pronunciation: [ɡul]; Occitan: Golas) is a commune in the Corrèze department in central France.

== Toponymy ==
From the Latin gula ("throat, defiled").

== Geography ==
The Maronne river forms part of the commune's northern boundary.

=== Population ===
Historical population
Year	Pop.	±% p.a.
1968	548	—
1975	524	−0.64%
1982	481	−1.22%
1990	413	−1.89%
1999	333	−2.36%
2007	346	+0.48%
2012	319	−1.61%
2017	332	+0.80%
2023	323	−0.46%
Source: INSEE

== Local culture and heritage ==
=== Places and monuments ===
- Église Saint-Martin de Goulles - church rebuilt in the 17th century;
- Église Saint-Pierre du Teule - church restored and enlarged in the middle of the 19th century;
- Maison Forte d'Auyères;
- The ruins of the Tours de Carbonnières - from the 11th century, listed as historical monuments, overlooks the Bedale stream.
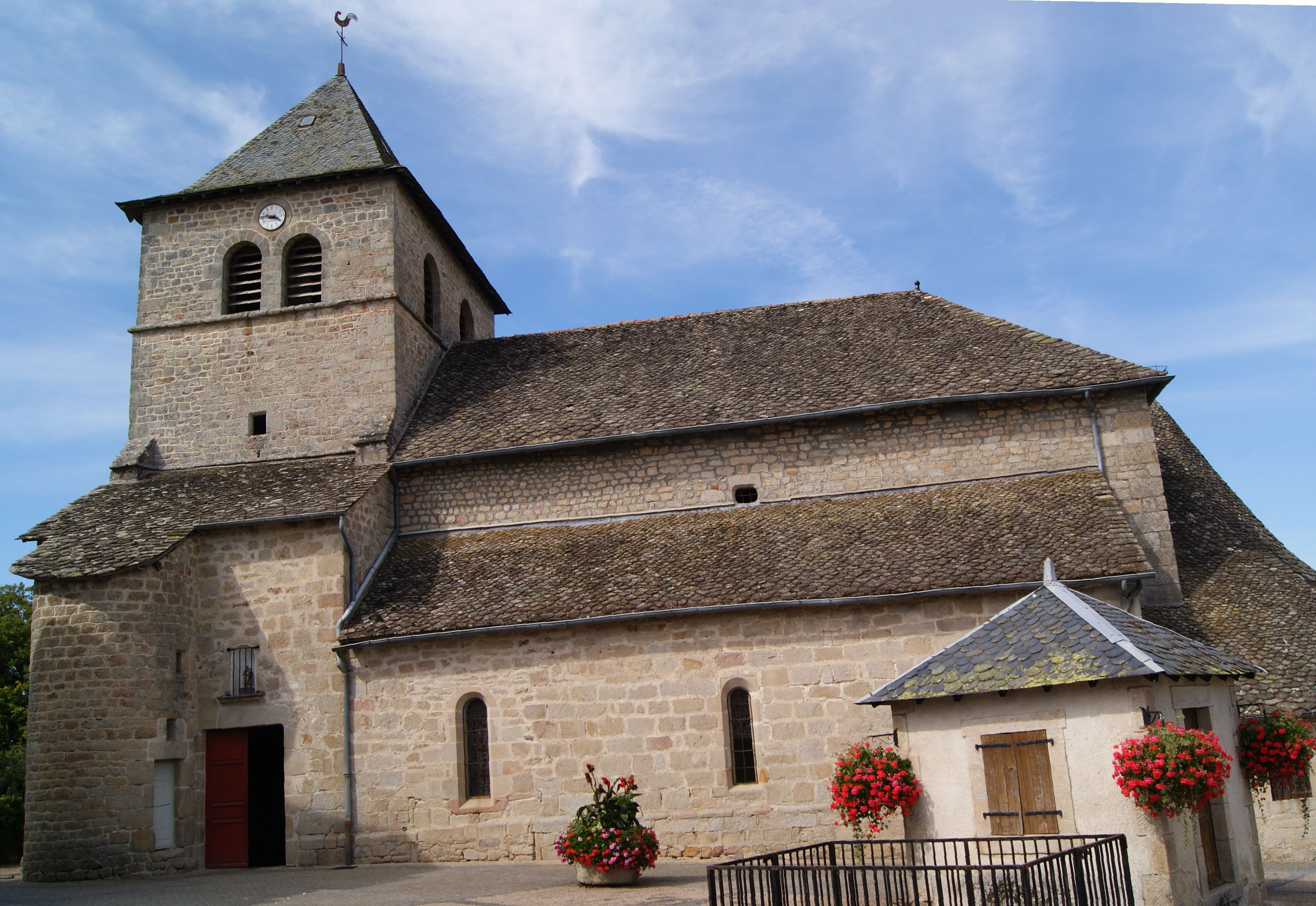
The church of Saint-Martin de Goulles.

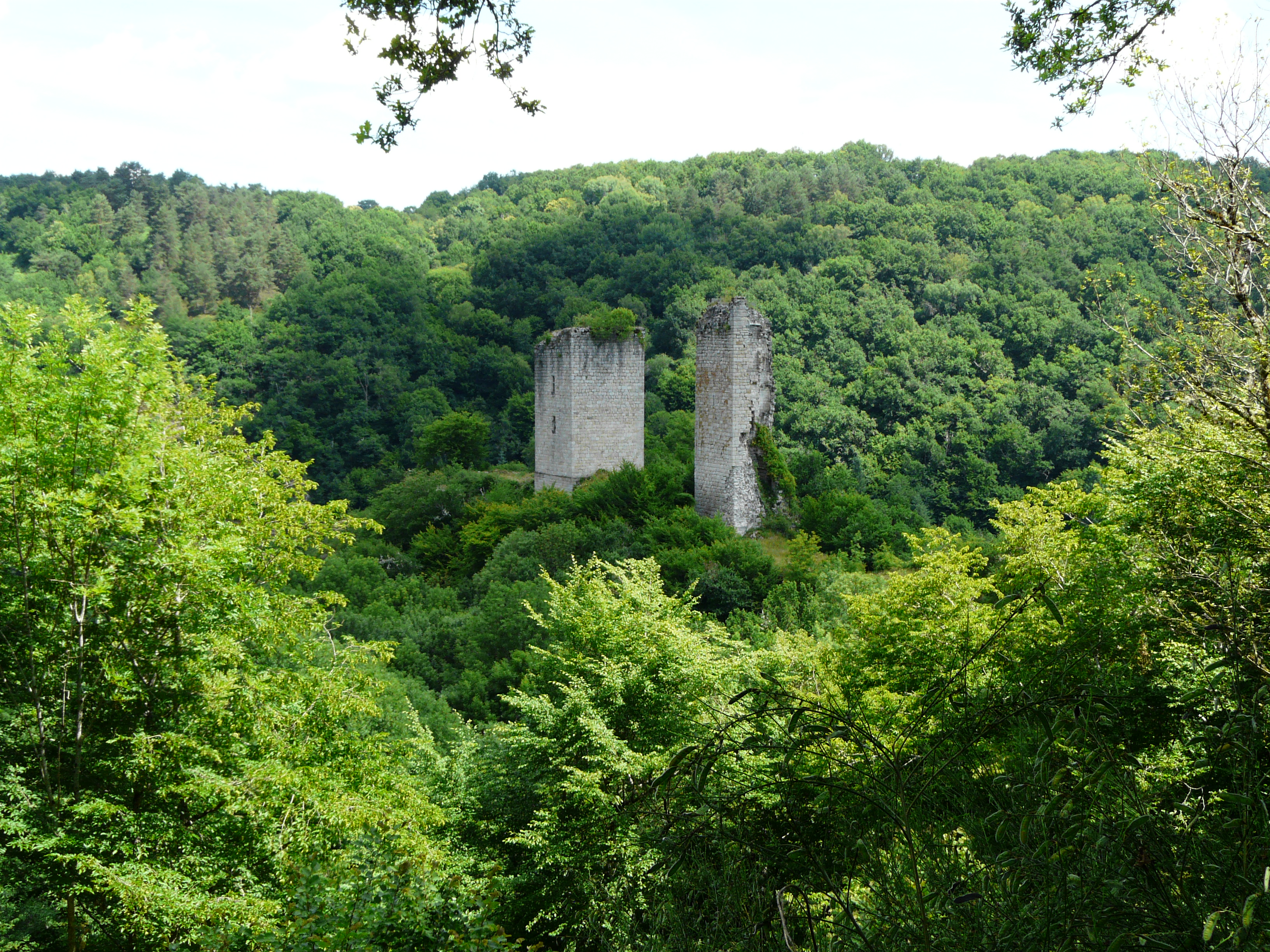
The ruins of the Towers of Carbonnières.

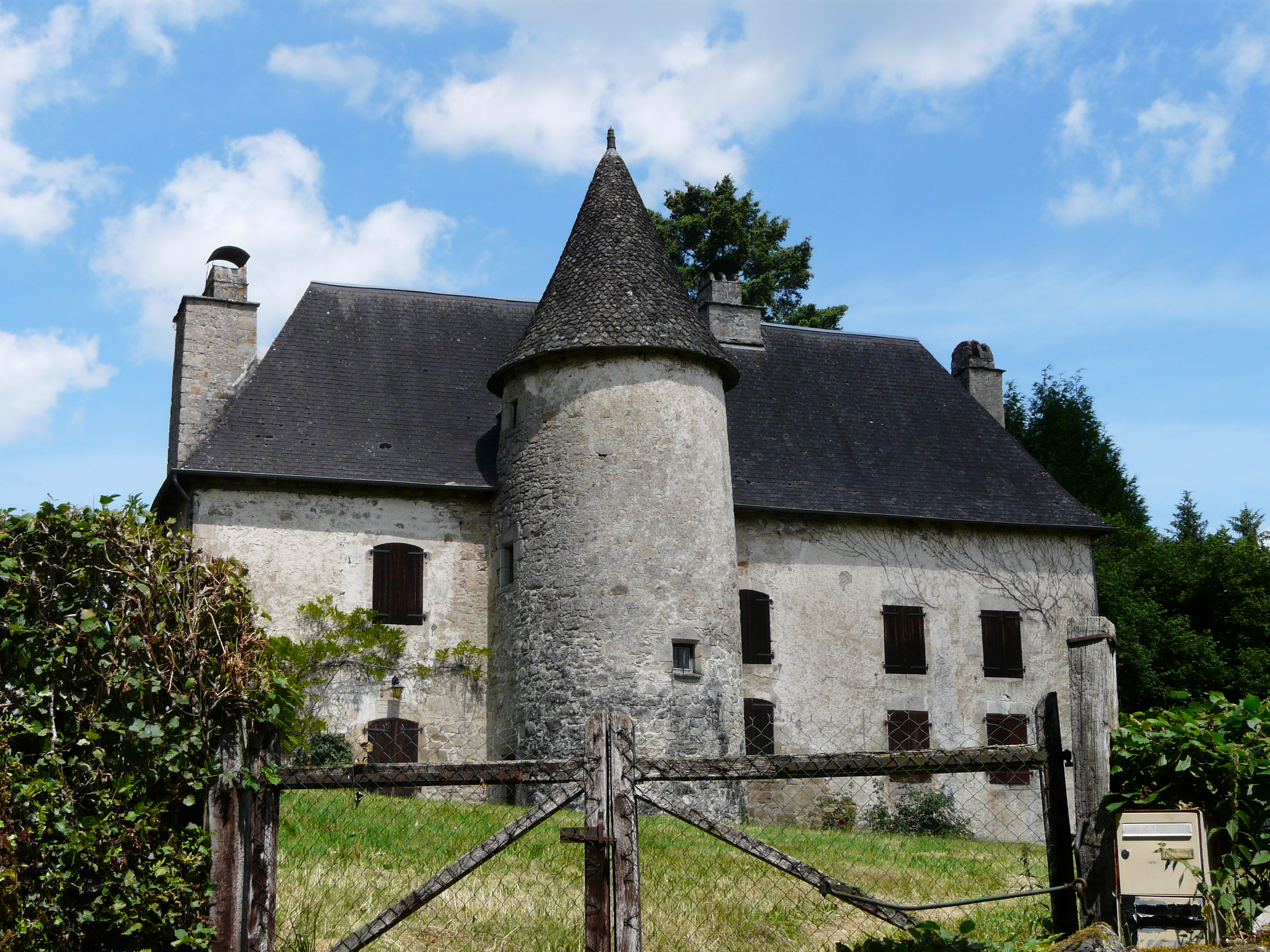
The fortified Maison d'Auyères.

== Notable people ==
- Jan Krizek (1919-1985), a Czech sculptor, and his wife Jirina (1919-2010), lived there from 1962 until their death, and are buried there.

== See also ==
- Communes of the Corrèze department
