= Monceaux-sur-Dordogne =

- Commune
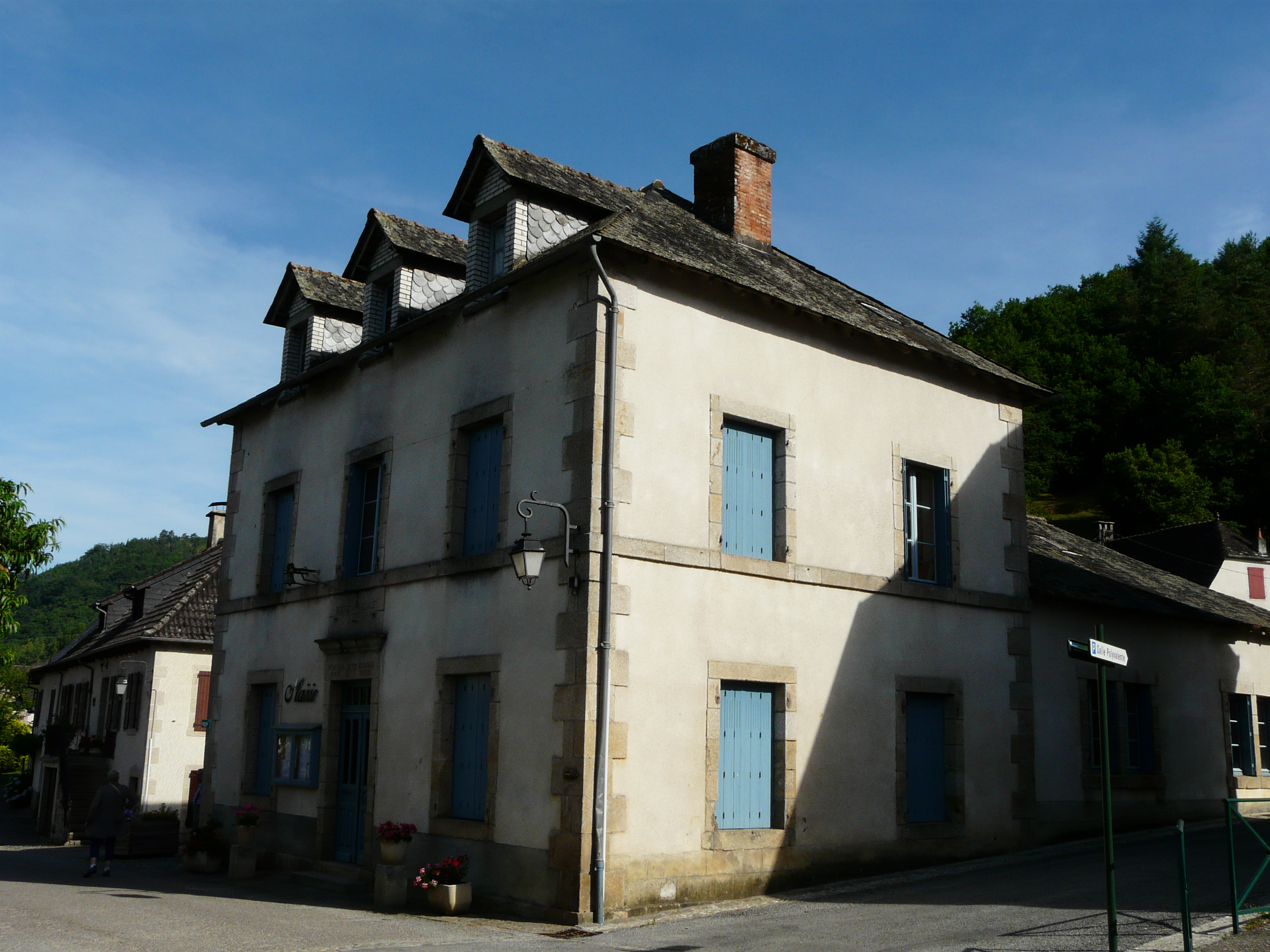
- Town hall

- Coat of arms
- Location of Monceaux-sur-Dordogne
- Location within France Location within Nouvelle-Aquitaine
- Coordinates: 45°04′58″N 1°54′30″E
- Country: France
- Region: Nouvelle-Aquitaine
- Department: Corrèze
- Arrondissement: Tulle
- Canton: Argentat-sur-Dordogne

Government
  - Mayor (2020–2026): Vincent Arrestier
- Area^{1}: 36.93 km^{2} (14.26 sq mi)
- Elevation: 185 m (607 ft)
- Highest elevation: 508 m (1,667 ft)
- Lowest elevation: 147 m (482 ft)
- Population (2023): 628
  - Density: 17.0/km^{2} (44.0/sq mi)
- Time zone: UTC+01:00 (CET)
  - Summer (DST): UTC+02:00 (CEST)
- INSEE/Postal code: 19140 /19400
- ^{1} French Land Register data, which excludes lakes, ponds, glaciers > 1 km^{2} (0.386 sq mi or 247 acres) and river estuaries.

Monceaux-sur-Dordogne (French pronunciation: [mɔ̃so syʁ dɔʁdɔɲ], literally Monceaux on Dordogne; Occitan: Molceon) is a commune in the Corrèze department in central France.

== Geography ==
Before joining the Dordogne, the Maronne river forms part of the commune's eastern boundary. The Dordogne forms part of its eastern border and most of its southern boundary.

== Population ==
Historical population
Year	Pop.	±% p.a.
1968	948	—
1975	812	−2.19%
1982	722	−1.66%
1990	703	−0.33%
1999	660	−0.70%
2007	682	+0.41%
2012	655	−0.80%
2017	636	−0.59%
2023	628	−0.21%
Source: INSEE

== See also ==
- Communes of the Corrèze department
