= Saint-Bonnet-les-Tours-de-Merle =

- Commune
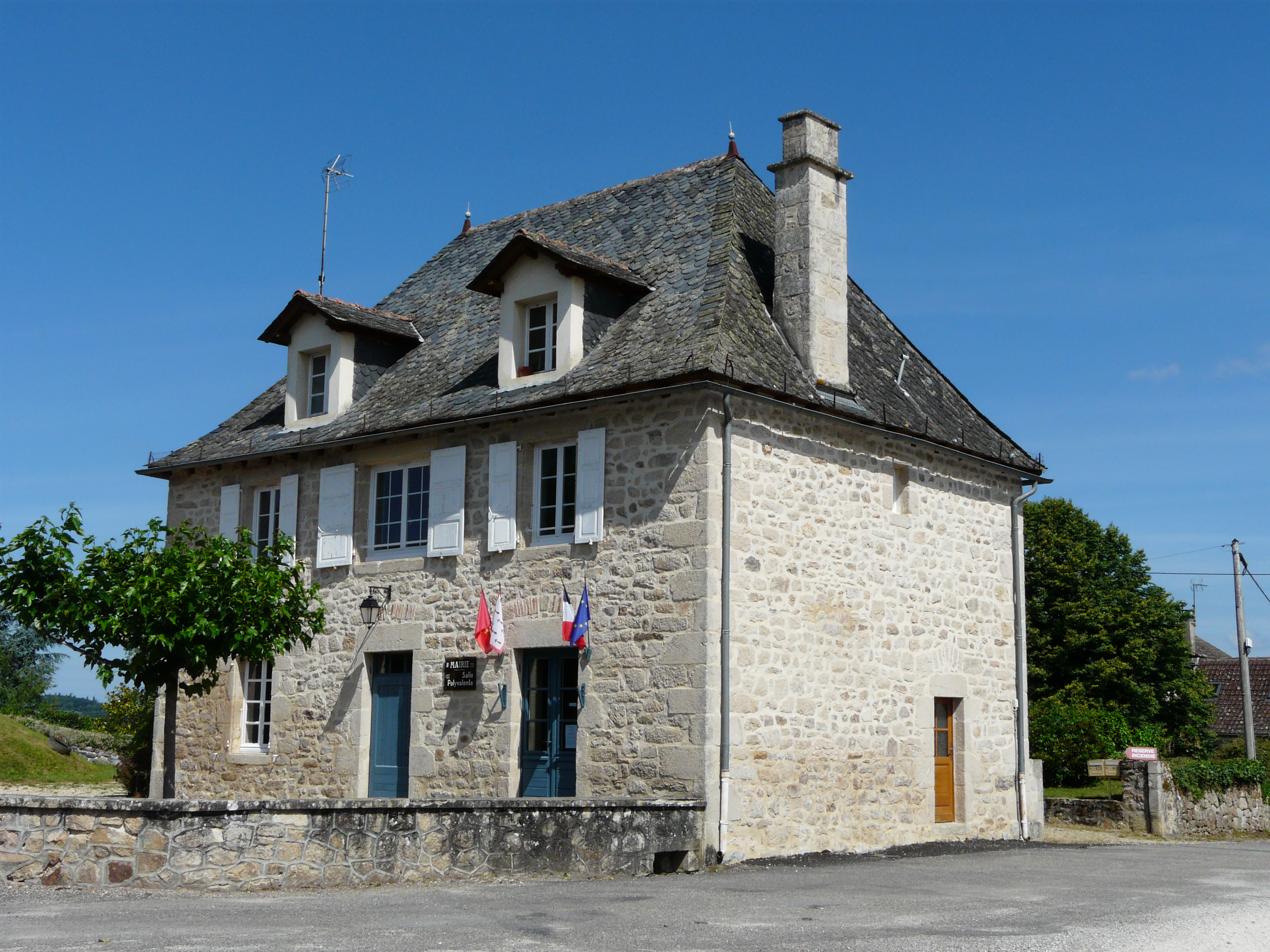
- Town hall

- Coat of arms
- Location of Saint-Bonnet-les-Tours-de-Merle
- Location within France Location within Nouvelle-Aquitaine
- Coordinates: 45°03′39″N 2°03′46″E
- Country: France
- Region: Nouvelle-Aquitaine
- Department: Corrèze
- Arrondissement: Tulle
- Canton: Argentat-sur-Dordogne

Government
  - Mayor (2020–2026): Jean-Michel Teulière
- Area^{1}: 5.94 km^{2} (2.29 sq mi)
- Elevation: 532 m (1,745 ft)
- Highest elevation: 564 m (1,850 ft)
- Lowest elevation: 247 m (810 ft)
- Population (2023): 41
  - Density: 6.9/km^{2} (18/sq mi)
- Time zone: UTC+01:00 (CET)
  - Summer (DST): UTC+02:00 (CEST)
- INSEE/Postal code: 19189 /19430
- ^{1} French Land Register data, which excludes lakes, ponds, glaciers > 1 km^{2} (0.386 sq mi or 247 acres) and river estuaries.

Saint-Bonnet-les-Tours-de-Merle (French pronunciation: [sɛ̃ bɔnɛ le tuʁ də mɛʁl]; Limousin: Sent Bonet las Tors de Merle) is a commune in the Corrèze department in central France.

== Geography ==
The Maronne river forms most of the commune's northern boundary.

== Population ==
Historical population
Year	Pop.	±% p.a.
1968	98	—
1975	74	−3.93%
1982	71	−0.59%
1990	74	+0.52%
1999	45	−5.38%
2007	43	−0.57%
2012	47	+1.79%
2017	48	+0.42%
2023	41	−2.59%
Source: INSEE

== See also ==
- Communes of the Corrèze department
