= Saint-Cirgues-la-Loutre =

- Commune
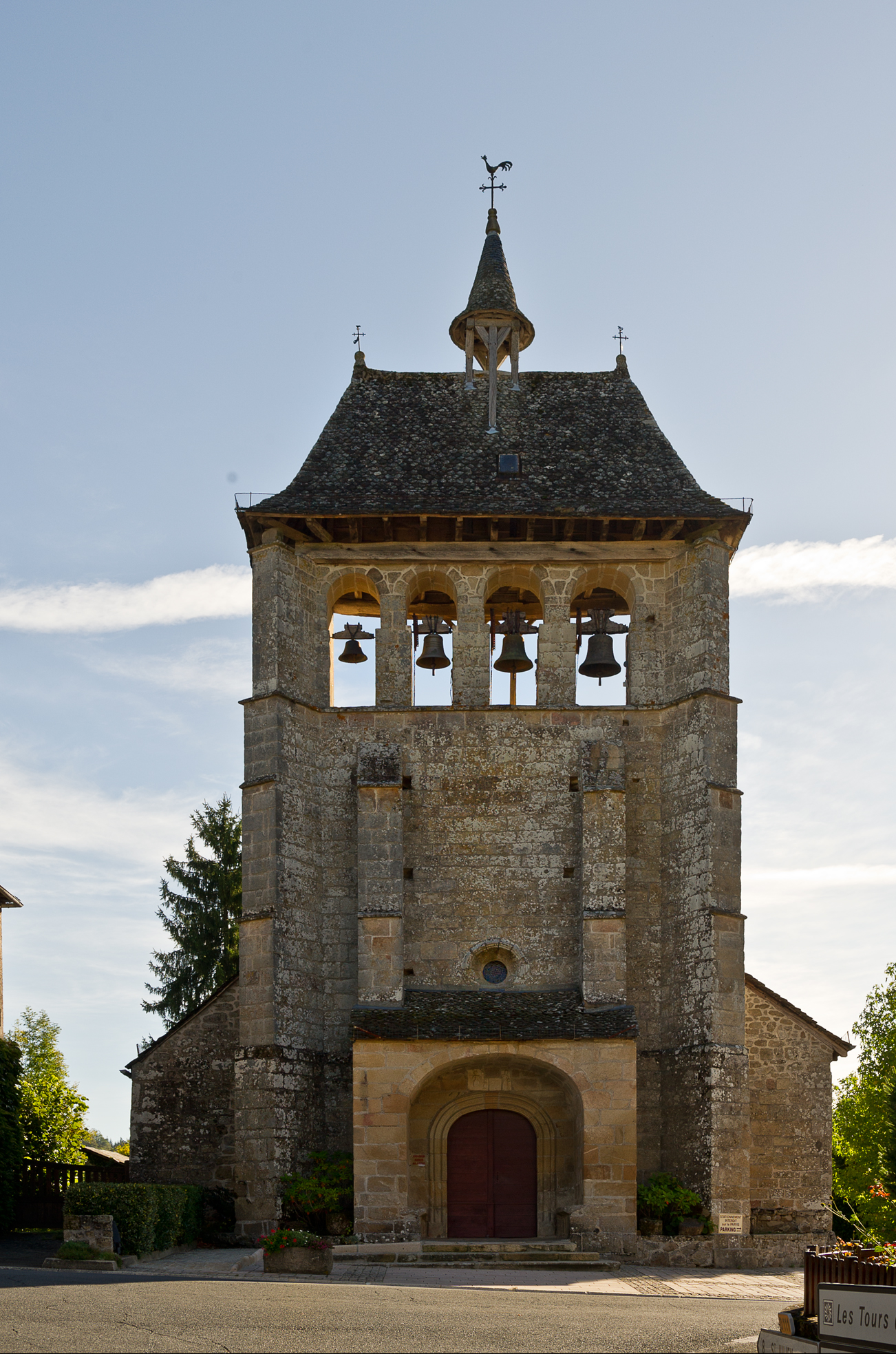
- The church of Saint-Cyr-Sainte-Julitte

- Coat of arms
- Location of Saint-Cirgues-la-Loutre
- Location within France Location within Nouvelle-Aquitaine
- Coordinates: 45°04′46″N 2°05′58″E
- Country: France
- Region: Nouvelle-Aquitaine
- Department: Corrèze
- Arrondissement: Tulle
- Canton: Argentat-sur-Dordogne

Government
  - Mayor (2020–2026): Aline Clavière
- Area^{1}: 18.41 km^{2} (7.11 sq mi)
- Elevation: 451 m (1,480 ft)
- Highest elevation: 575 m (1,886 ft)
- Lowest elevation: 301 m (988 ft)
- Population (2023): 188
  - Density: 10.2/km^{2} (26.4/sq mi)
- Time zone: UTC+01:00 (CET)
  - Summer (DST): UTC+02:00 (CEST)
- INSEE/Postal code: 19193 /19220
- ^{1} French Land Register data, which excludes lakes, ponds, glaciers > 1 km^{2} (0.386 sq mi or 247 acres) and river estuaries.

Saint-Cirgues-la-Loutre (French pronunciation: [sɛ̃ siʁɡ la lutʁ]; Occitan: Sent Cirgues la Loira) is a commune in the Corrèze department in central France.

== Geography ==
The commune is located in the south of the Corrèze department, in the Xaintrie. It is bordered to the south-east by the Maronne river, and crossed by its tributary the Glane d'Ancèze (or Glane de Malesse). It is bordered by the Cantal and the Auvergne-Rhône-Alpes region. The village of Saint-Cirgues-la-Loutre, located at the intersection of the D13 and D111 roads, is located thirteen kilometres east of Argentat. The municipality is also served by the D111E2 road.

=== Population ===
Historical population
Year	Pop.	±% p.a.
1968	362	—
1975	304	−2.46%
1982	267	−1.84%
1990	230	−1.85%
1999	188	−2.22%
2007	195	+0.46%
2012	180	−1.59%
2017	176	−0.45%
2023	188	+1.11%
Source: INSEE

== History ==
During the French Revolution, following a decree by the National Convention, the commune changed its name to Cirgue-l'Eyge.

In 1919, the commune of Saint-Cirgues took the name of Saint-Cirgues-la-Loutre.

== See also ==
- Communes of the Corrèze department
