= Emmanuel Flipo =

French artist

Emmanuel Flipo (born 1958 in Agen) is a French artist, who currently lives and works in Montreuil and Pézenas.

Flipo studied at the Ecole des Beaux-Arts in Toulouse in 1977. From 1978 to 1982, he continued his studies at the Ecole des Arts Décoratifs in Nice. For the following decade, he operated a drawing school in Pézenas.1993 E. After his first trip to New York City, where he met André Emmerich and Ouattara, he regularly returned until 2003 for work. In 1997 he founded the movement "la colectiva." In 2001 he had a significant influence on the founding of the center of contemporary art "Stop Art" C.A., USA. Finally, in 2003 Emmanuel Flipo founded "L'Usine 64" in Montreuil – a transformed abandoned factory – and created his studio there. Since then, he has spent winters at Usine 64 and summers at his studio in Pézenas.

== Work ==
=== Etude topographique ===
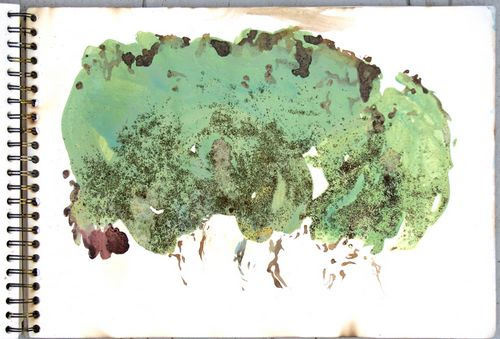
Etude Topographique, Emmanuel Flipo, 2008

The series "Etude topographique" is one of the most extended by Emmanuel Flipo. It is composed of watercolor paintings and collage works created from found materials. Influenced by Asian calligraphy and Russian constructivism, Flipo developed his topographic studies by creating a particular combination of shapes, subtle lines, and free spaces. He names his artistic vocabulary "figuration particulière and moléculaire". Based on the idea that the artist should stay out of focus, Emmanuel Flipo operates rather than "medium" for the cycle "Etude topographique." (According to the ideas of the French artistic movement Supports/Surfaces meaning that the work itself should be focused - and not the artist.) Most of the forms and colors – created by found colors, leaves, feathers, rests of wallpapers – remind the spectator of an accident or coincidence. The used material mix results in surface structures full of suspense.

=== Collage ===
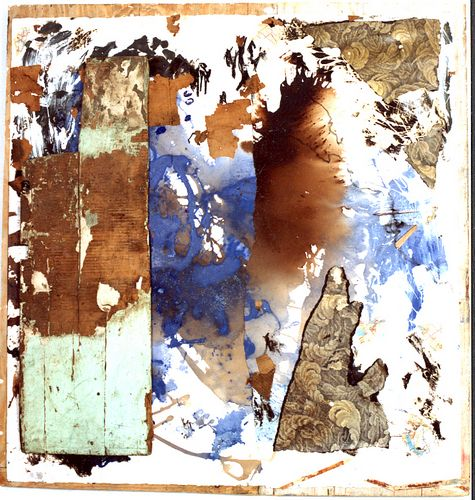
Collage, Emmanuel Flipo, 1998

Most of the large-scale collage works by Emmanuel Flipo are implicated in the "Etude topographique." For this cycle, Flipo combines collage, painting, and drawing. The artist refers once more to the French artist group for these works. Amongst others, the artists of Support/Surfaces deal with the democratization of the found or purchased materials, the creative process, and the final piece.

For his collage works, Flipo uses only found materials such as linoleum, card or wooden boards, colors, coffee, and leaves. Filipo creates a multilayered surface, referring to each material's history and erosion. Due to time, this artwork modification is integral to Flipo's work.

=== Performances ===
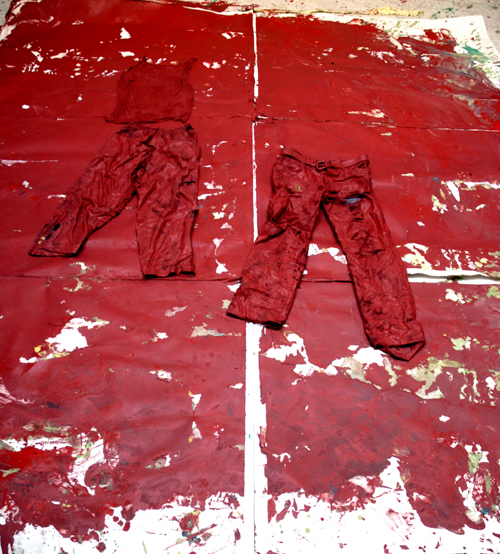
Relicts of the performances "Extra-territorialité", with Jonathan Abbou, L'Usine 64, 2007, Photo: Emmanuel Flipo

Emmanuel Flipo realized his first performance, called "El Nino," in 1996 in New York City on 53rd street, which dealt with geopolitics and global warming. By performing, Flipo becomes a part of the artistic work, and the creative process is centered. Only the documentation stays for an audience who didn't participate in the performances itself, like in the works of Joseph Beuys - analyzed by Flipo in detail, especially his notion of Gesamtkunstwerk and the rapport of life and art. On the occasion of the performances films are realized. These films, as well as the relics, are declared as artworks. Furthermore, photos by artists Igor Vishnyakov or Jonathan Abbou, invited by Flipo to his performances, are part of the final work. Through the intentional involvement and the exclusion of the spectator, the application of music, fire, water, and earth, Flipo continues his occupation with the circle of life and related subjects and creates spaces far over the seen elements.

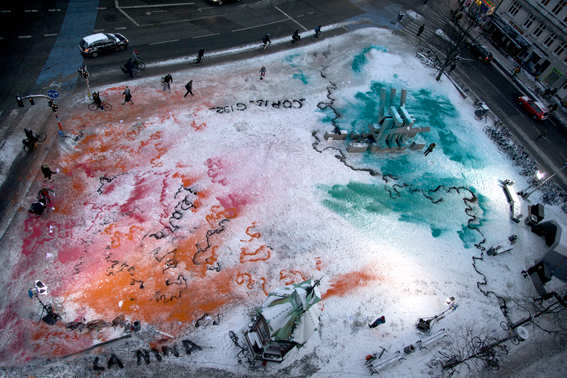
View of the performance "La Niña by Emmanuel Flipo, Copenhagen, 2009, Photo: Nicolas Chorier

On the occasion of the 15th Conference of the Parties in Copenhagen in 2009, Emmanuel Flipo drew one of his modelized representations of the world using pigments thrown to the wind. The performance, "La Niña," was performed in front of an audience in the Sankt Hans Torv in Copenhagen. It aimed to bring public awareness of future upheaval and the grave environmental problems threatening the planet. With its urban proportions, the artwork utilized geographical dimensions, with aerial and terrestrial photographs giving the public an idea of the different scales used.

== Exhibitions (selection) ==
=== Solo shows ===
2010 : Squat Rivoli, Paris / France

2007 : Usine 64, Montreuil

2002 : Centre d’Art « Stop Art », San Jose, California

1999 : Galerie Rodriguez Degranier, New York

1992 : CRDC, Rosny-sur-Seine

1988 : Galerie Hélène Trintignan, Montpellier

=== Group exhibitions ===
2017 : Art Compulsion, Montpellier

2009 : "Le Carré dans l‘Art", Galerie Blumann, Paris / France

2009: Studio of Jonathan Abbou, Montreuil

1987 - 1990 : Artist of the Gallery Blackman Havey, London

1988 : Galerie Clavé, Guadalajara, Mexico

1986 : Galerie Hélène Trintignan, Montpellier

== Catalogs ==
- "Les Gens du Picaro - Portrait d'Emmanuel Flipo", 2008, catalog
- "Akdéniz (mer claire en turc, "Méditerranée)", Pézenas with texts by Loic Lantoine and photos by a.o. Igor Visnyakov
- "Emmanuel Flipo - La Mémoire des Vivants et des Morts", text by André-Pierre Arnal, 1992–1993
- "érosions", Rodriguez Degranier Gallery, catalog
- "Emmanuel Flipo", with a text by Dimitry Nesterov, catalog
