= Centre de musique romantique française =

Research centre and concert venue in Venice

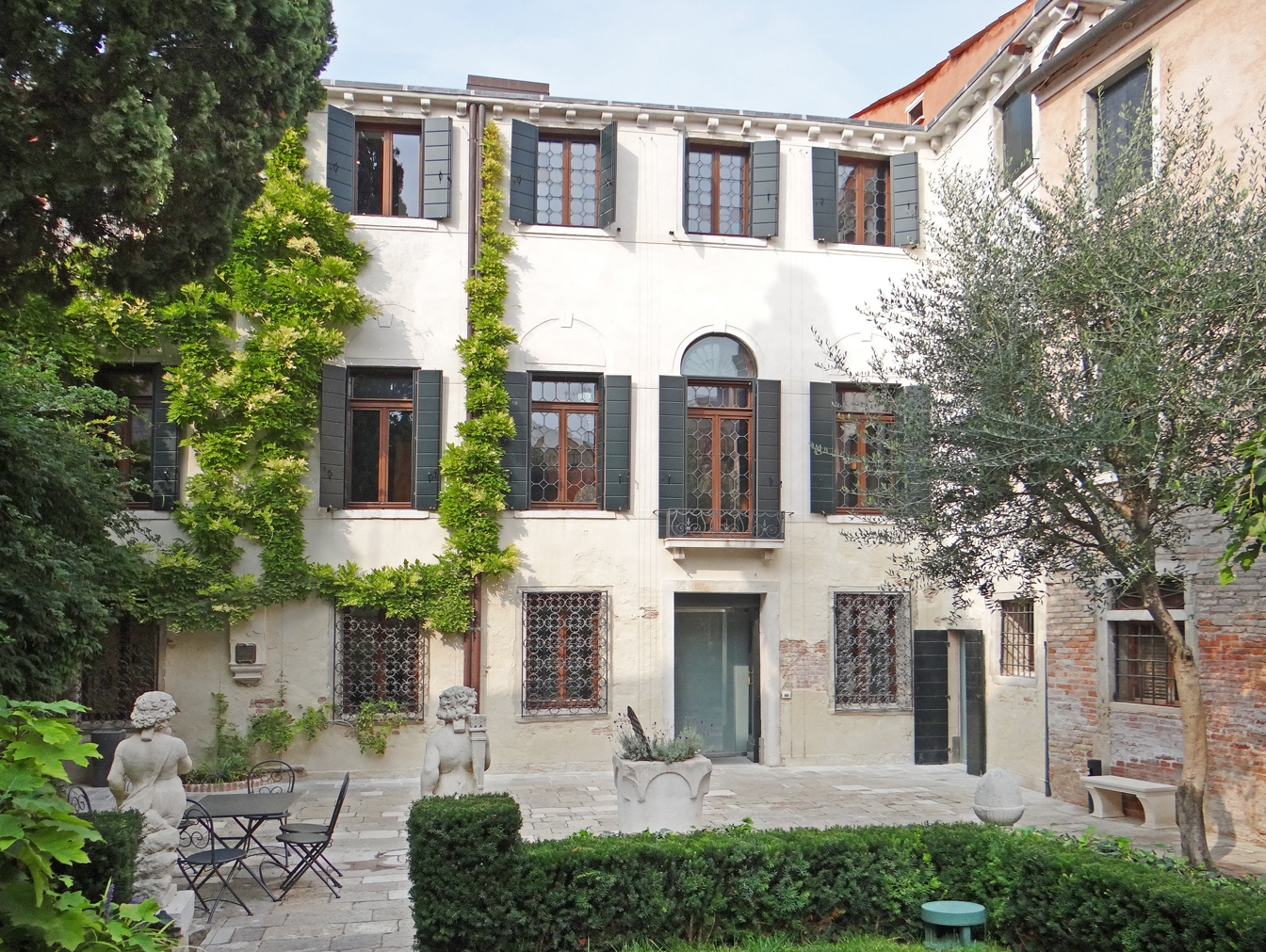
The garden and the entrance to the Palazzetto Bru Zane

The Centre de musique romantique française ('centre for French Romantic music") is a French-administered cultural institution, research centre and concert hall in Venice, in north-eastern Italy. It is housed in the Palazzetto Bru Zane, an annex to the Palazzo Zane Collalto, on the Rio Marin in the sestiere of San Polo. The centre opened in October 2009. It is funded by the Fondation Bru, which also bought, restored and renamed the Casino Zane. The centre uses the name Palazzetto Bru Zane − Centre de musique romantique française.

== Palazzetto ==
In 1695, Marino Zane (1639–1709) commissioned the construction of a library (no longer extant) and a casino ("small house") next to the Zane family palace, the Palazzo Zane Collalto. This Casino was to house his collection of books and paintings, and to serve as a venue for art, music, and amusement. The architect Antonio Gaspari was responsible for the interior decoration. Palazzo Zane later passed to the Venier family, and in about 1784 was sold to the Collalto.

In 2006 the Fondation Bru bought the Casino from Dominic Habsburg-Lothringen for eight million euros, and then spent more than four million more on restoring it. The building now holds offices, studios, a library, and the original concert hall, which now holds an Erard piano from 1902. The frescoes in the salon and on the grand staircase, now attributed to Sebastiano Ricci, were also restored.

== Activities ==
The centre has a staff of fifteen, and an annual budget of three million euros. It organises concerts, opera performances, and festivals both in Venice and elsewhere. It also organises musicological conferences and publishes books, sheet music, and musical recordings, either independently or in co-operation with more than 40 labels. It operates an internet radio station, Bru Zane Classical Radio, which broadcasts only French Romantic music.
