= Bernard Andrieu =

French philosopher and historian (born 1959)

Bernard Andrieu (born 24 December 1959 in Agen) is a French philosopher and historian of the body.

== Biography ==
Andrieu was born on 24 December 1959 in Agen. He studied in Bordeaux from 1978 to 1984. He is a professor at the University of Nancy. He has written on the philosophy of neuroscience and the mind-body problem, as well as the history of bodily practices such as tanning, touch, the open air, and immersion. He is the editor of a 450-article Dictionary of the Body.

== Works ==
- La neurophilosophie, Paris: Presses Universitaires de France, 1998
- Les cultes du corps: éthique et sciences, Paris: Éd. l'Harmattan, 1994
- (ed.) Le Dictionnaire du Corps: en sciences humaines et sociales, 2006
