= Fondation Bru =

Swiss charitable foundation

The Fondation Bru is a Swiss-registered charitable foundation, administering the charitable interests of the Bru family, formerly founders and owners of French pharmaceutical laboratories Groupe UPSA prior to the acquisition of the group in by Bristol-Myers Squibb.

== Palazzetto Bru Zane ==
The Palazzetto Bru Zane, formerly Palazzetto Zane, is a restored palace, currently the seat of the Centre de musique romantique française in Venice.
