= Agen La Garenne Airport =

Agen La Garenne Airport Aérodrome d'Agen - La Garenne
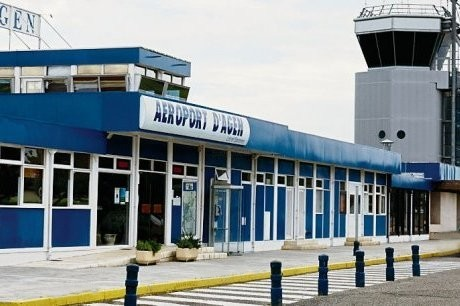
- IATA: AGF; ICAO: LFBA

Summary
- Airport type: Public
- Operator: Syndicat Mixte Aérodrome Départemental (SMAD) du Lot et Garonne
- Serves: Agen, France
- Location: Le Passage, France
- Elevation AMSL: 204 ft / 62 m
- Coordinates: 44°10′29″N 00°35′26″E

Map
- Location of airport in Nouvelle-Aquitaine region

Runways
| Direction | Length | | Surface |
| Direction | m | ft | Surface |
|---|---|---|---|
| 11/29 | 2,165 | 7,103 | Asphalt |

Statistics (2011)
- Aircraft movements: 36,998
- Passengers: 35,108
- Source: French AIP

Agen La Garenne Airport or Aérodrome d'Agen - La Garenne (IATA: AGF, ICAO: LFBA) is an airport located in Le Passage and 3 km (2 miles) southwest of Agen, both communes of the Lot-et-Garonne département in the Nouvelle-Aquitaine région of France.

== Airlines and destinations ==
As of 19 June 2020, there are no regular commercial passenger flights as Chalair stopped flying the Public service obligation (PSO) route to Paris-Orly.

== Traffic and statistics ==
Traffic by calendar year
| | Passengers | Change from previous year | Movements |
|---|---|---|---|
| 1998 | 25 671 | -- | -- |
| 1999 | 26 285 | ▲2.4% | -- |
| 2000 | 24 277 | ▼7.6% | 38 163 |
| 2001 | 27 044 | ▲11.4% | 36 664 |
| 2002 | 33 784 | ▲24.9% | 36 757 |
| 2003 | 33 434 | ▼1.0% | 27 918 |
| 2004 | 3 716 | ▼88.9% | 33 824 |
| 2005 | 15 231 | ▲309.9% | 24 287 |
| 2006 | 23 024 | ▲51.2% | 24 436 |
| 2007 | 7 244 | ▼68.5% | 30 990 |
| 2008 | 23 461 | ▲223.9% | 75 844 |
| 2009 | 28 040 | ▲19.5% | 30 246 |
| 2010 | 31 324 | ▲11.7% | 35 186 |
| 2011 | 35 108 | ▲12.1% | 36 998 |
Source: Union des aéroports Français
