= Godefroi, Comte d'Estrades =

Marshal of France

Godefroi d'Estrades
- Comte d'Estrades
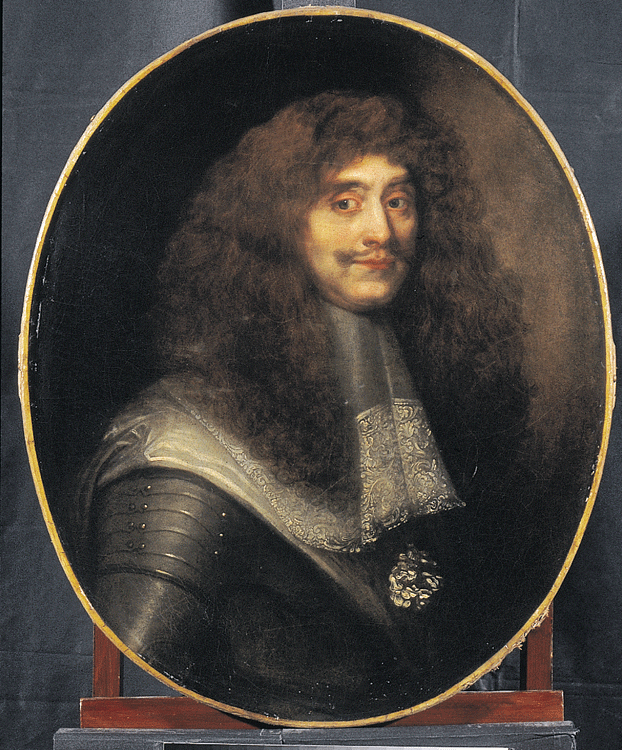
- Godefroi, Comte d'Estrades, 17th century
- Born: 1607; Agen, France
- Died: 26 February 1686 (aged 78–79); Paris, France
- Father: François d'Estrades
- Military career
- Allegiance: Dutch Republic; Kingdom of France
- Rank: Marshal of France
- Wars: Dutch Revolt; Thirty Years' War; Franco-Spanish War
- Awards: Order of the Holy Spirit; Order of Saint Michael

Godefroi, Comte d'Estrades (1607 – February 26, 1686) was a French diplomat and marshal.

== Biography ==
D'Estrades was born in Agen. He was the son of Francois d'Estrades (died 1653), a partisan of Henry IV, and brother of Jean d'Estrades, Bishop of Condom. He became a page to Louis XIII, and at the age of nineteen was sent on a mission to Maurice of Holland.

In 1646 d'Estrades was named ambassador extraordinary to Holland, and took part in the conferences at Münster. Sent in 1661 as Ambassador to England, he obtained in 1662 the restitution of Dunkirk. In a dispute in London over precedence of the Ambassadors' carriages, he clashed with Charles de Watteville, Ambassador of Spain, which degenerated into an armed struggle with several dead, and almost led to a new Franco-Spanish war.

In 1667 he negotiated the Treaty of Breda with the king of Denmark, and in 1678 the Treaty of Nijmwegen, which ended the war with Holland. Independently of these diplomatic missions, he took part in the principal campaigns of Louis XIV, in Italy (1648), in Catalonia (1655), in Holland (1672); and was created marshal of France in 1675. He left Lettres, memoires et négociations en qual d'ambassadeur en Hollande depuis 1663 jusqu'en 1668, of which the first edition in 1709 was followed by a nine-volume edition (London (the Hague), 1743). (Note: See Felix Salomon, Frankreichs Beziehungen zu dem Schottischen Aufstand (1637-1640), containing an excursus on the falsification of the letters of the comte d'Estrades; Philippe Lauzun, Le Marichal d'Estrades (Agen, 1896) — Chisholm 1911, p. 801.)

== Family ==
Of the sons of Godefroi d'Estrades, Jean-François d’Estrades was ambassador to Venice and Piedmont; Louis, marquis d'Estrades (died 1711), succeeded his father as governor of Dunkirk, and was the father of Godefroi Louis, comte d'Estrades (died 1717), lieutenant-general, who was killed at the siege of Belgrade.

== See also ==
- Marshals of France
