= Agen (meteorite) =

Meteorite found in France

- Type: Chondrite
- Class: Ordinary chondrite
- Group: H5
- Country: France
- Region: Aquitaine
- Coordinates: 44°13′N 0°37′E
- Observed fall: Yes
- Fall date: September 5, 1814
- TKW: 30 kg

Agen is an H chondrite meteorite that fell to earth on September 5, 1814, in Aquitaine, France. It is an ordinary chondrite that belongs to the petrologic type 5, thus was assigned to the group H5.

== See also ==
- Glossary of meteoritics
- Meteorite falls
- Ordinary chondrite
