= Canton of Agen-4 =

Coordinates: 44.21°N 0.61°E

The canton of Agen-4 is an administrative division of the Lot-et-Garonne department, southwestern France. It was created at the French canton reorganisation which came into effect in March 2015. Its seat is in Agen.

It consists of the following communes:

1. Agen (partly)
2. Le Passage
