= Mercœur, Corrèze =

Mercœur
- Commune
- Coat of arms
- Location of Mercœur
- Location within France Location within Nouvelle-Aquitaine
- Coordinates: 45°00′57″N 1°56′54″E
- Country: France
- Region: Nouvelle-Aquitaine
- Department: Corrèze
- Arrondissement: Tulle
- Canton: Argentat-sur-Dordogne

Government
  - Mayor (2020–2026): André Poujade
- Area^{1}: 29.94 km^{2} (11.56 sq mi)
- Elevation: 527 m (1,729 ft)
- Highest elevation: 564 m (1,850 ft)
- Lowest elevation: 198 m (650 ft)
- Population (2023): 228
  - Density: 7.62/km^{2} (19.7/sq mi)
- Time zone: UTC+01:00 (CET)
  - Summer (DST): UTC+02:00 (CEST)
- INSEE/Postal code: 19133 /19430
- ^{1} French Land Register data, which excludes lakes, ponds, glaciers > 1 km^{2} (0.386 sq mi or 247 acres) and river estuaries.

Mercœur (French pronunciation: [mɛʁkœʁ]; Occitan: Mércuer) is a commune in the Corrèze department in central France.

== Geography ==
The commune of Mercœur, crossed by the 45th parallel north, is therefore located equidistant from the North Pole and the Earth's equator (about 5,000 km).

Mercœur is a commune located in the Massif Central between Brive-la-Gaillarde and Aurillac. It is briefly bordered to the north by the Maronne, an important tributary of the Dordogne river.

=== Population ===
Historical population
Year	Pop.	±% p.a.
1968	441	—
1975	368	−2.55%
1982	345	−0.92%
1990	323	−0.82%
1999	267	−2.09%
2007	248	−0.92%
2012	255	+0.56%
2017	245	−0.80%
2023	228	−1.19%
Source: INSEE

== Places and monuments ==
- Église Saint-Martin de Mercœur - The building was listed as a historical monument in 1927.

== See also ==
- Communes of the Corrèze department
