= Hautefage =

- Commune
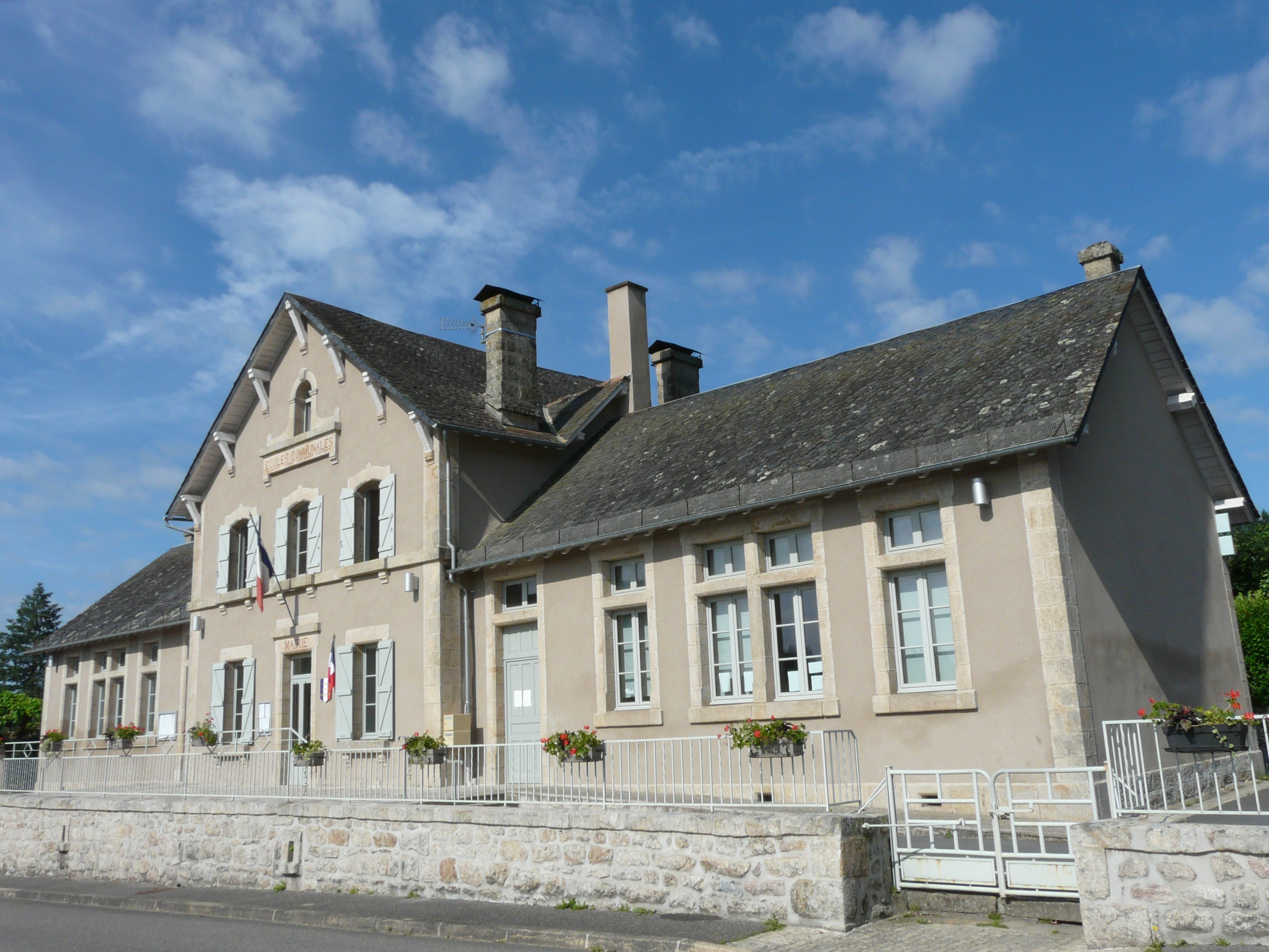
- Town hall

- Coat of arms
- Location of Hautefage
- Location within France Location within Nouvelle-Aquitaine
- Coordinates: 45°05′01″N 2°00′07″E
- Country: France
- Region: Nouvelle-Aquitaine
- Department: Corrèze
- Arrondissement: Tulle
- Canton: Argentat-sur-Dordogne

Government
  - Mayor (2020–2026): Camille Carmier
- Area^{1}: 24.06 km^{2} (9.29 sq mi)
- Elevation: 460 m (1,510 ft)
- Highest elevation: 564 m (1,850 ft)
- Lowest elevation: 176 m (577 ft)
- Population (2023): 313
  - Density: 13.0/km^{2} (33.7/sq mi)
- Time zone: UTC+01:00 (CET)
  - Summer (DST): UTC+02:00 (CEST)
- INSEE/Postal code: 19091 /19400
- ^{1} French Land Register data, which excludes lakes, ponds, glaciers > 1 km^{2} (0.386 sq mi or 247 acres) and river estuaries.

Hautefage (French pronunciation: [otfaʒ]; Occitan: Autafaja) is a commune in the Corrèze department in central France.

== Geography ==
The Maronne river forms all of the commune's southeastern boundary.

== Population ==
Historical population
Year	Pop.	±% p.a.
1968	386	—
1975	358	−1.07%
1982	330	−1.16%
1990	309	−0.82%
1999	280	−1.09%
2007	307	+1.16%
2012	312	+0.32%
2017	313	+0.06%
2023	313	+0.00%
Source: INSEE

== See also ==
- Communes of the Corrèze department
