= Agen =

Prefecture of Lot-et-Garonne, Nouvelle-Aquitaine, France

- Prefecture and commune
- Panorama of the city of Agen

- Flag Coat of arms
- Location of Agen
- Location within France Location within Nouvelle-Aquitaine
- Coordinates: 44°12′18″N 0°37′16″E
- Country: France
- Region: Nouvelle-Aquitaine
- Department: Lot-et-Garonne
- Arrondissement: Agen
- Canton: Agen-1, Agen-2, Agen-3, Agen-4
- Intercommunality: Agglomération d'Agen

Government
  - Mayor (2020–2026): Jean Dionis du Séjour (MoDem)
- Area^{1}: 11.49 km^{2} (4.44 sq mi)
- Elevation: 48 m (157 ft)
- Highest elevation: 162 m (531 ft)
- Lowest elevation: 37 m (121 ft)
- Population (2023): 32,801
  - Density: 2,855/km^{2} (7,394/sq mi)
- Demonym: Agenais
- Time zone: UTC+01:00 (CET)
  - Summer (DST): UTC+02:00 (CEST)
- INSEE/Postal code: 47001 /47000
- Website: agen.fr
- ^{1} French Land Register data, which excludes lakes, ponds, glaciers > 1 km^{2} (0.386 sq mi or 247 acres) and river estuaries.

Agen (French: [aʒɛ̃], locally [aˈʒɛŋ]; Occitan: [aˈdʒen]) is the prefecture of the southwestern French department of Lot-et-Garonne. It lies on the river Garonne, 135 kilometres (84 miles) southeast of Bordeaux. As of 2023, the population of the commune was 32,801.

== History ==
Agen (Latin Aginnum) was the capital of the Celtic tribe of the Nitiobroges, and the discovery of extensive ruins attests its importance under the Roman Empire. In later times it was the capital of the Agenais region. Its bishopric was founded in the 4th century. Agen changed hands more than once in the course of the Albigensian wars, and at their close a tribunal of inquisition was established in the town and inflicted cruel persecution on the heretics. During the religious wars of the 16th century, Agen took the part of the Catholics and openly joined the League in 1589.

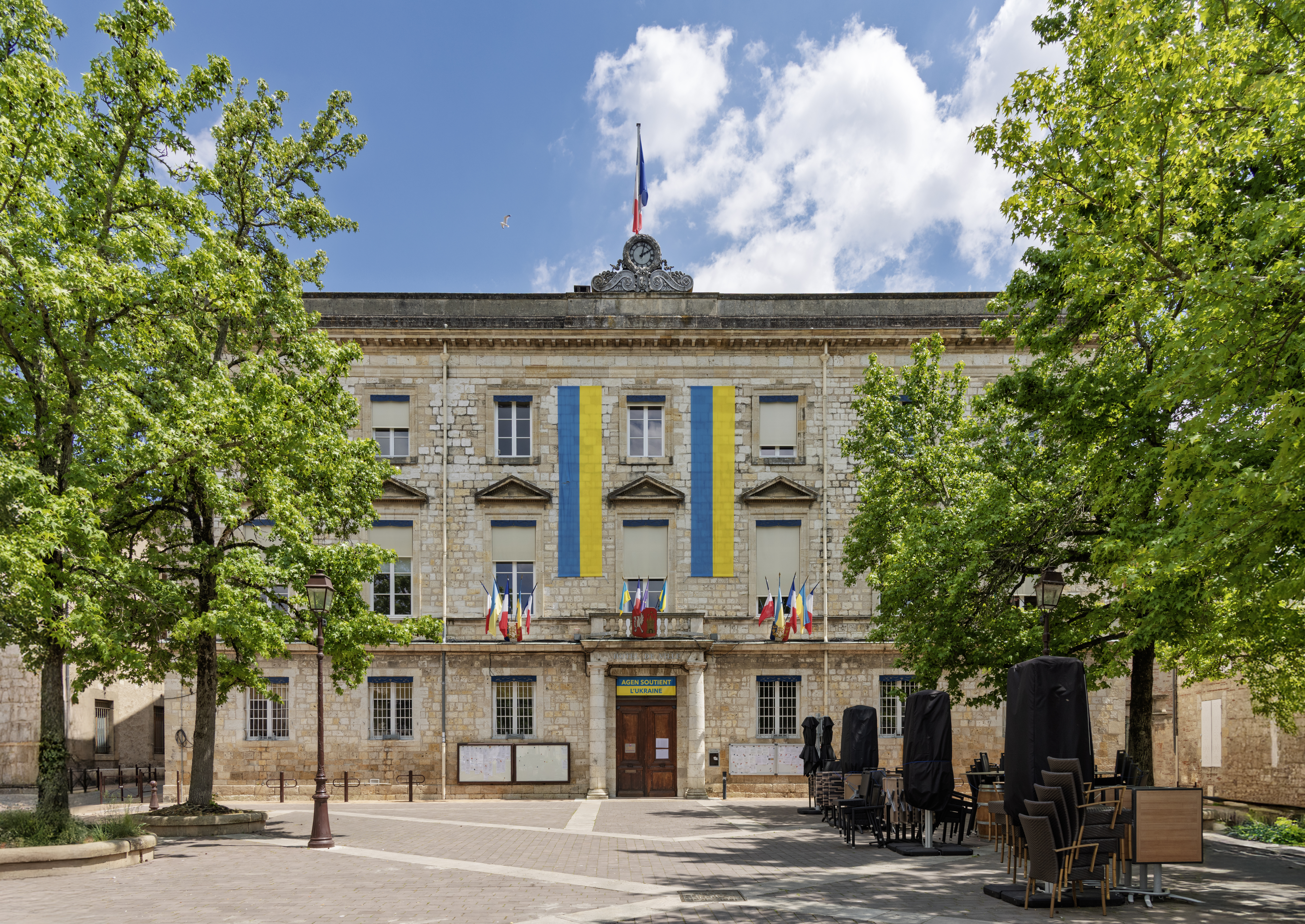
The Hôtel de Ville

The Hôtel de Ville was completed in around 1666.

== Geography ==
The city of Agen lies in the southwestern department of Lot-et-Garonne in the Nouvelle-Aquitaine region. The city centre lies on the east bank of the river Garonne, the Canal de Garonne flows through the city, approximately halfway between Bordeaux 132 km (82 mi) and Toulouse 107 km (66 mi).

=== Climate ===
Agen features an oceanic climate (Cfb) in the Köppen climate classification and according to the latest temperature numbers borders a humid subtropical climate (Cfa). According to the Trewartha climate classification the climate is now humid subtropical (Cf). Winters are mild and feature cool to cold temperatures while summers are mild and warm. Rainfall is spread equally throughout the year; however, most sunshine hours are from March–September.

Climate data for Agen - La Garenne (AGF), elevation: 58 m (190 ft) (1991–2020 normals, extremes 1941–present)
Month	Jan	Feb	Mar	Apr	May	Jun	Jul	Aug	Sep	Oct	Nov	Dec	Year
Record high °C (°F)	20.1 (68.2)	25.2 (77.4)	26.5 (79.7)	30.2 (86.4)	35.5 (95.9)	39.3 (102.7)	40.6 (105.1)	42.5 (108.5)	36.7 (98.1)	32.9 (91.2)	25.4 (77.7)	21.6 (70.9)	42.5 (108.5)
Mean daily maximum °C (°F)	9.6 (49.3)	11.6 (52.9)	15.6 (60.1)	18.2 (64.8)	22.0 (71.6)	25.6 (78.1)	28.0 (82.4)	28.3 (82.9)	24.8 (76.6)	20.0 (68.0)	13.6 (56.5)	10.0 (50.0)	18.9 (66.0)
Daily mean °C (°F)	6.1 (43.0)	6.9 (44.4)	10.1 (50.2)	12.6 (54.7)	16.3 (61.3)	19.8 (67.6)	21.9 (71.4)	22.0 (71.6)	18.6 (65.5)	14.9 (58.8)	9.6 (49.3)	6.6 (43.9)	13.8 (56.8)
Mean daily minimum °C (°F)	2.5 (36.5)	2.3 (36.1)	4.6 (40.3)	7.0 (44.6)	10.5 (50.9)	13.9 (57.0)	15.7 (60.3)	15.7 (60.3)	12.3 (54.1)	9.8 (49.6)	5.6 (42.1)	3.1 (37.6)	8.6 (47.5)
Record low °C (°F)	−17.4 (0.7)	−21.9 (−7.4)	−10.5 (13.1)	−3.9 (25.0)	−1.6 (29.1)	2.5 (36.5)	5.9 (42.6)	4.7 (40.5)	1.0 (33.8)	−5.0 (23.0)	−8.8 (16.2)	−12.1 (10.2)	−21.9 (−7.4)
Average precipitation mm (inches)	59.6 (2.35)	44.2 (1.74)	49.0 (1.93)	70.0 (2.76)	73.3 (2.89)	62.2 (2.45)	49.4 (1.94)	50.4 (1.98)	60.6 (2.39)	58.7 (2.31)	70.1 (2.76)	60.7 (2.39)	708.2 (27.88)
Average precipitation days (≥ 1.0 mm)	10.3	8.3	9.0	10.3	9.9	7.9	6.3	6.9	8.0	8.9	11.0	10.2	107.2
Mean monthly sunshine hours	75.6	112.7	171.8	186.2	215.5	234.9	260.2	250.1	210.7	142.9	87.6	71.7	2,019.7
Source: Meteociel

== Toponymy ==
From Occitan Agen (1197), itself from Latin Aginnum (3rd century Itinéraire d'Antonin), from a Celtic root agin- meaning "rock or height".

== Population ==
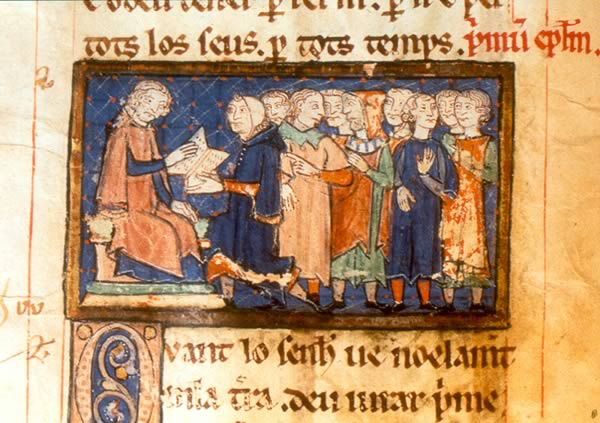
Alphonse, Count of Poitiers and Count of Toulouse, recognized the autonomy of the commune of Agen. In this illustration he takes an oath before the consuls with his right hand on the town ordinances, while sitting on a pedestal. The consul administering the oath is forced to go on his knees, symbolizing Alphonse's lordship and the town's loyalty.

Historical population

Year	Pop.	±% p.a.
1793	19,639	—
1800	9,876	−9.35%
1806	10,850	+1.58%
1821	11,659	+0.48%
1831	12,631	+0.80%
1836	13,399	+1.19%
1841	14,987	+2.27%
1846	15,517	+0.70%
1851	16,027	+0.65%
1856	17,667	+1.97%
1861	17,263	−0.46%
1866	18,222	+1.09%
1872	18,887	+0.60%
1876	19,503	+0.81%
1881	20,485	+0.99%
1886	22,055	+1.49%
1891	23,234	+1.05%
1896	22,730	−0.44%
1901	22,482	−0.22%

Year	Pop.	±% p.a.
1906	23,141	+0.58%
1911	23,294	+0.13%
1921	23,391	+0.04%
1926	23,530	+0.12%
1931	24,939	+1.17%
1936	27,152	+1.71%
1946	33,397	+2.09%
1954	32,593	−0.30%
1962	32,800	+0.08%
1968	34,949	+1.06%
1975	34,039	−0.38%
1982	31,593	−1.06%
1990	30,553	−0.42%
1999	30,170	−0.14%
2007	33,863	+1.45%
2012	33,730	−0.08%
2017	33,576	−0.09%
2023	32,801	−0.39%

Source: EHESS and INSEE (1968-2023)

== Economy ==
The town has a higher level of unemployment than the national average. Major employers include the pharmaceutical factory UPSA.

== Sights ==
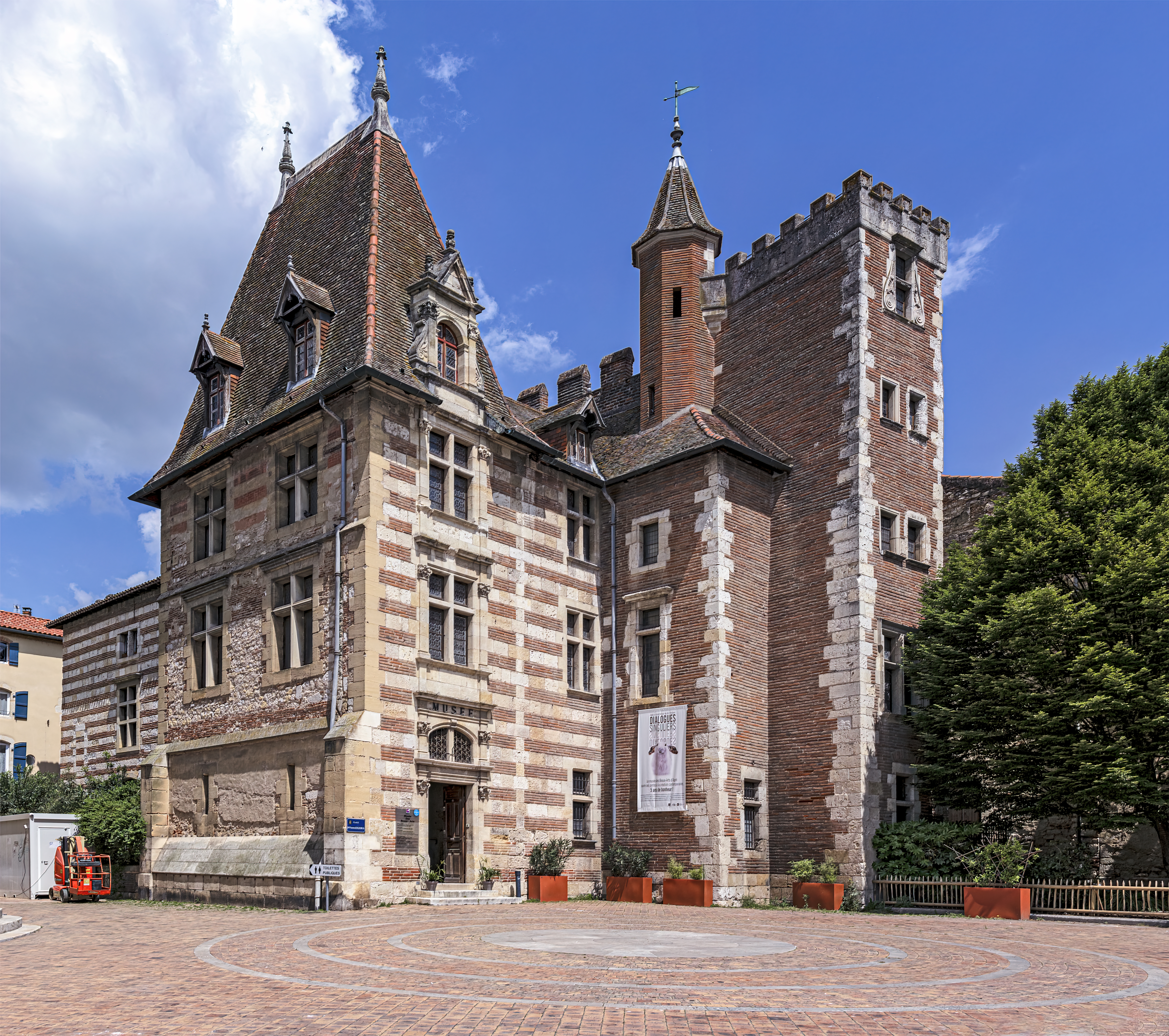
Museum of Fine Arts seen from the Place du Dr Esquirol.

The old centre of town contains a number of medieval buildings.

The twelfth century Agen Cathedral, dedicated to Saint Caprasius, is one of the few large churches in France with a double nave, a regional trait also found in the Church of the Jacobins in nearby Toulouse.

The Saint Hilaire church, dedicated to the theme of the Holy Trinity which the Saint in question did a lot to defend, is notable for its unusual statues in front of the Church – Moses on the right, and St Peter on the left.

The art museum, the Musée des Beaux Arts, contains artefacts, furniture and sculptures from prehistoric times onwards. The art gallery contains several hundred works, including several by Goya, and others by Bonnard and Seurat. The collection also contains a large number of works by artists who lived locally. The museum is made up of twenty or so rooms.

The Canal des Deux Mers, which joins the Mediterranean with the Atlantic, crosses the river Garonne at Agen via the town's famous canal bridge.

== Colour photography pioneer ==
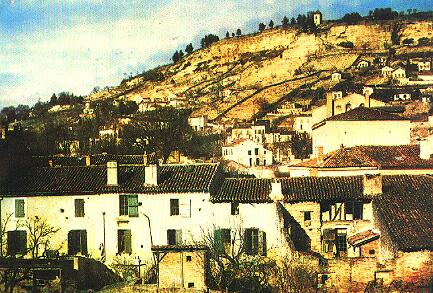
View of Agen, 1874-1876.

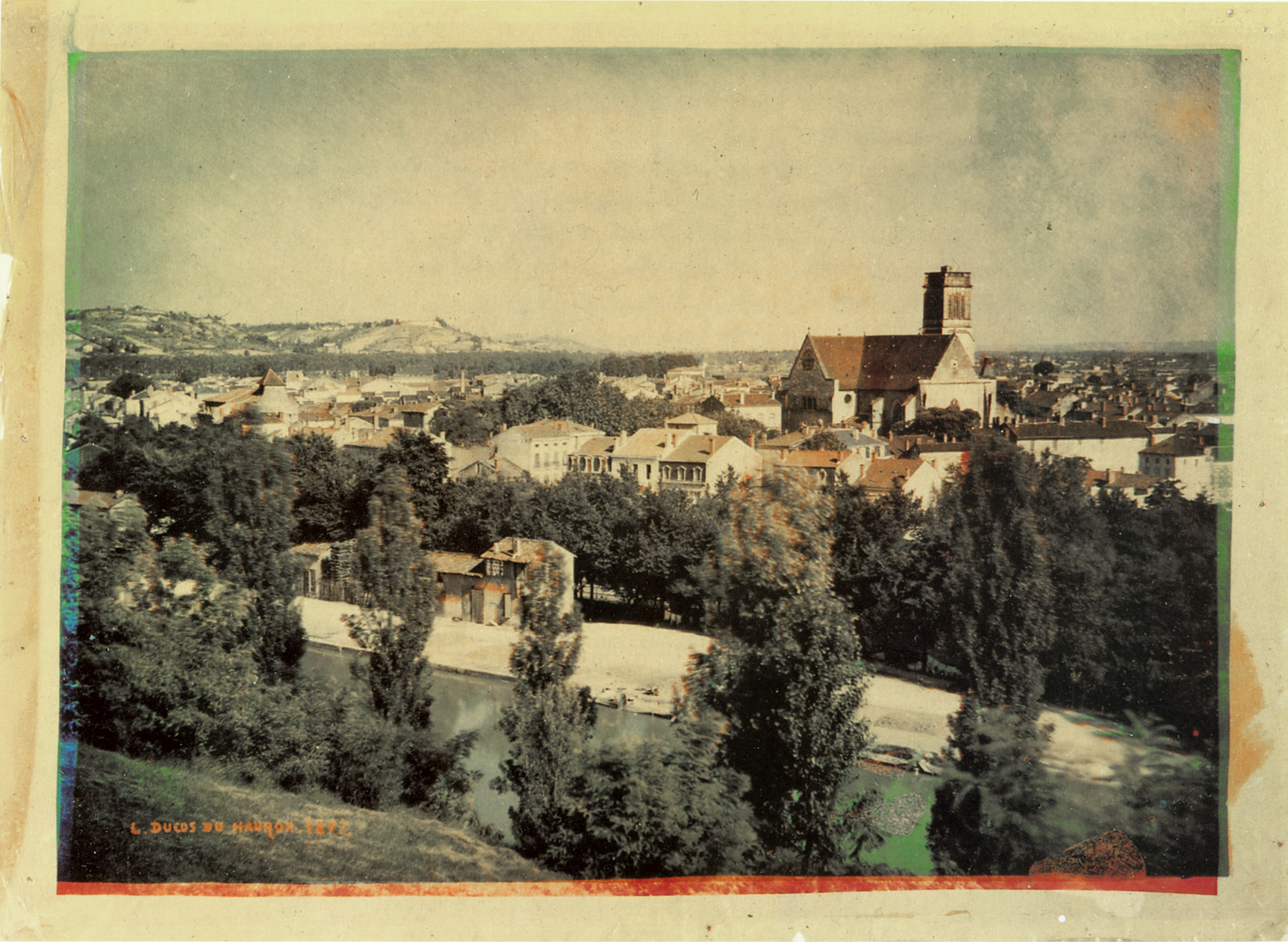
1877: Agen showing the St Caprais Cathedral. Heliochrome (multilayer dichromated pigmented gelatin process). George Eastman House

Louis Arthur Ducos du Hauron (1837 – 1920), a pioneer of colour photography lived and worked in Agen. He developed practical processes for colour photography on the three-colour principle, using both additive and subtractive methods. In 1868 he patented his ideas (French Patent No. 83061) and in 1869 he published them in Les couleurs en photographie, solution du problème.

The most widely reproduced of his surviving colour photographs is the View of Agen, an 1877 landscape, printed by the subtractive assembly method which he pioneered. Several different photographs of the view from his attic window, one dated 1874, also survive.

== Entertainment ==
The municipal theatre "Théâtre Ducourneau" presents theatre, and occasionally classical concerts. The smaller "Théâtre du jour" has a resident theatre company presenting a variety of recent or older plays (Shakespeare, Beckett, as well as lesser known playwrights).

There are two cinemas, one a commercial multiscreened affair, the other an arts cinema run by a voluntary organization. The latter organizes film festivals every year.

== Sport ==
Rugby is extremely popular in the town, and the local team, SU Agen, is enthusiastically supported. The town also serves as the base for the Team Lot-et-Garonne cycling team.

== Transport ==
The Gare d'Agen connects Agen with Toulouse and Bordeaux as well as Périgueux. It is around an hour from Toulouse and around an hour from Bordeaux. The TGV train to Paris takes three hours and thirteen minutes with a stop in Bordeaux.

Agen is connected, by the A62 autoroute, to both Toulouse and Bordeaux.

The Agen Airport is serviced by Airlinair service to Paris Orly 6 days a week. It is also used for business and leisure flying.

Agen stands on the voie verte cycle path between the Mediterranean and close to Bordeaux.

== Diocese ==
Agen is the seat of a Roman Catholic diocese that comprises the Département of Lot and Garonne. It is a suffragan of the archdiocese of Bordeaux.

== Twin towns – sister cities ==
Agen is twinned with:

- Corpus Christi, United States
- Dinslaken, Germany
- Galena, Illinois, United States
- Llanelli, Wales, United Kingdom
- Toledo, Spain
- Tuapse, Russia

== Notable people ==
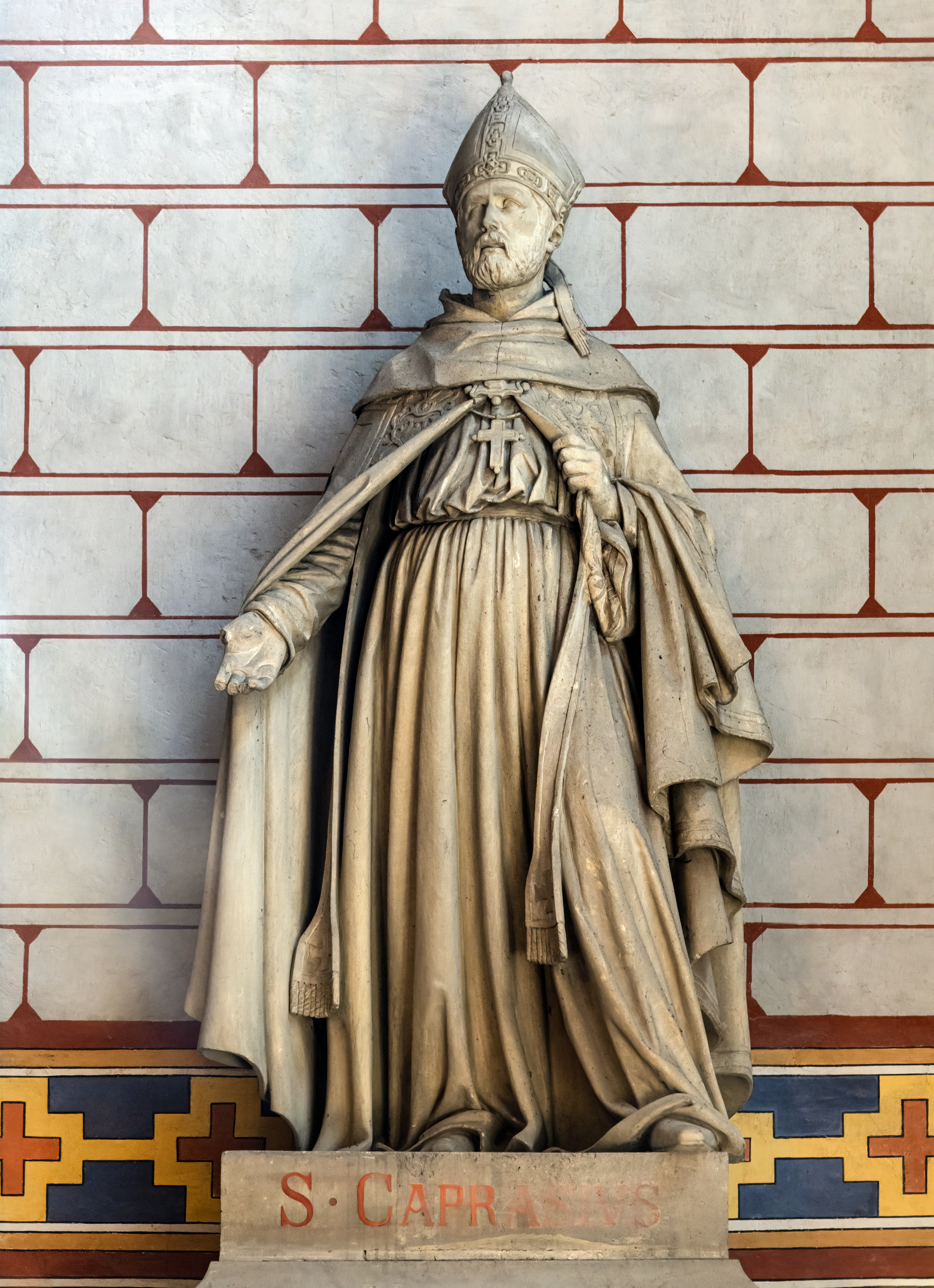
Saint Caprasius of Agen in Agen Cathedral

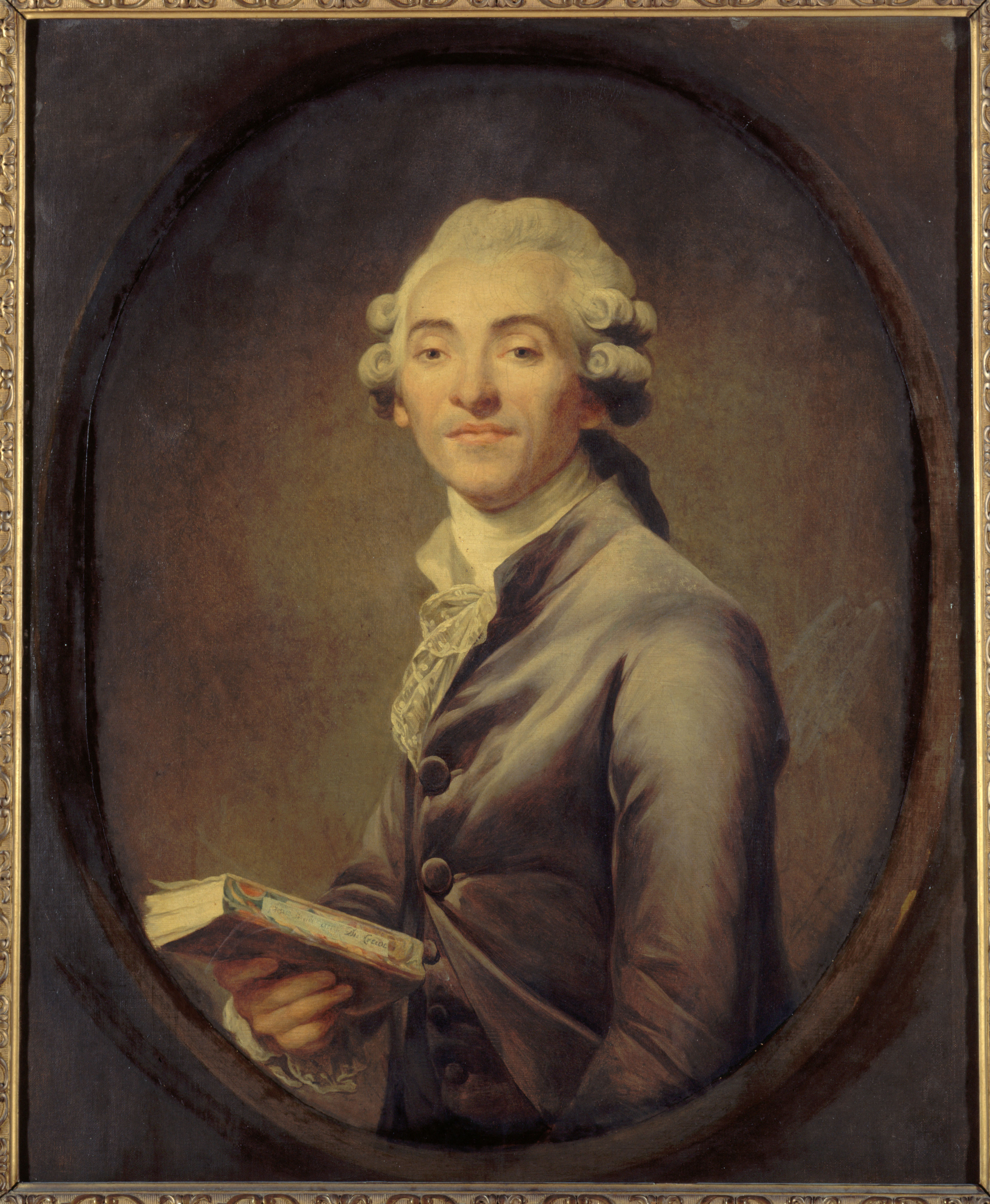
Portrait of Bernard Germain de Lacépède

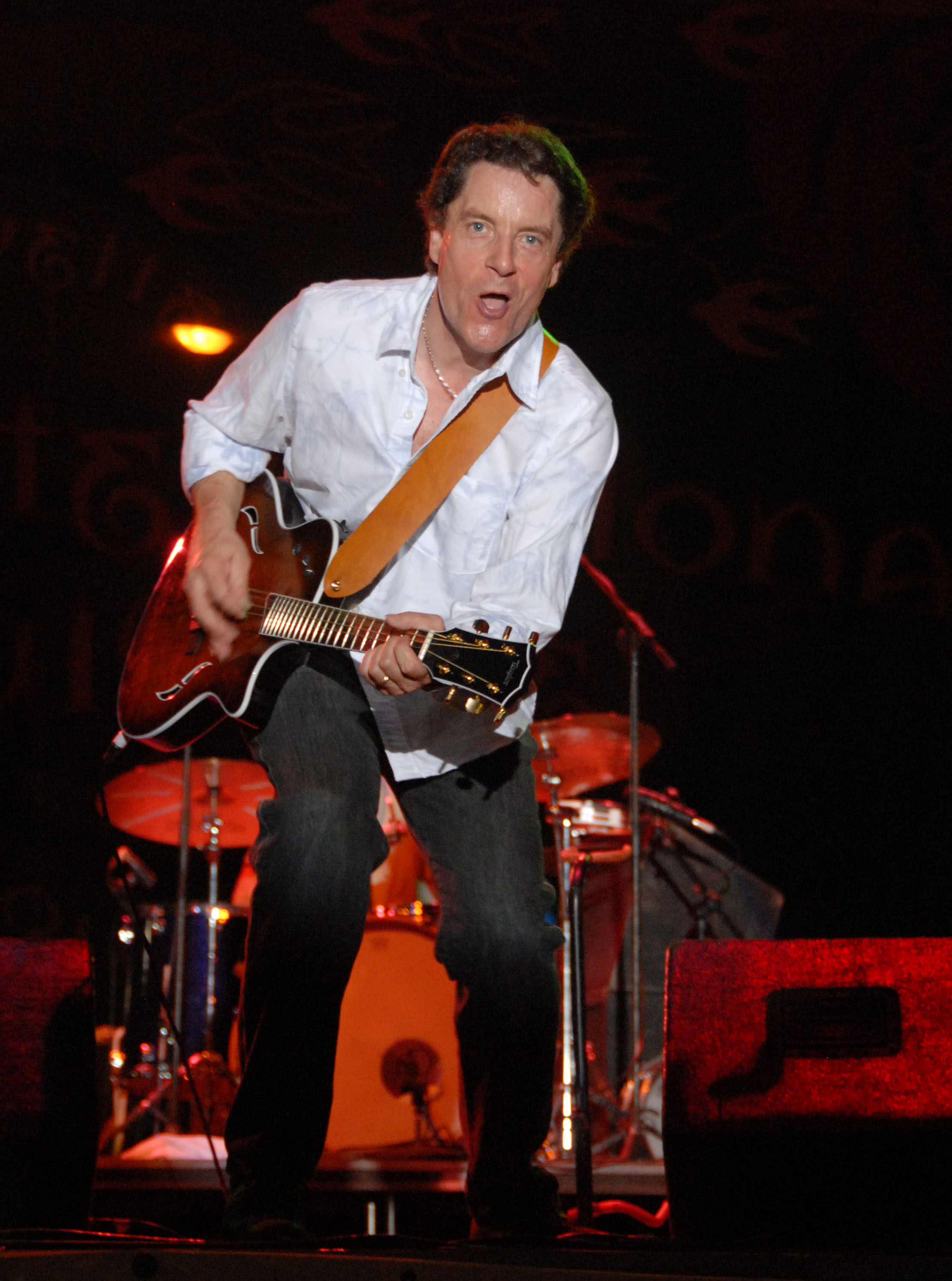
Francis Cabrel, 2007

As place of birth

- Saint Caprasius of Agen, a Christian martyr and saint of the 4th. century
- Phoebadius of Agen (died ca. 392), a Catholic bishop of the fourth century.
- Bernard Palissy (ca.1510–1590), potter, he may have been born in Saintes.
- Joseph Justus Scaliger (1540–1609), Calvinist religious leader and scholar.
- Pierre Dupuy (1582–1651), writer and scholar.
- Francés de Corteta (1586-1667), nobleman and poet
- Joseph Barsalou (1600–1660), apothecary and physician.
- Godefroi, Comte d'Estrades (1607–1686), diplomatist and Marshal of France.
- Bernard Germain de Lacépède (1756–1825), naturalist and active freemason.
- Jean Hilaire Asté (1775–1840), professor of music and instrument-maker, inventied the ophicleide
- Jean Baptiste Bory de Saint-Vincent (1780–1846), naturalist and politician.
- Jacques Jasmin (1798–1864), Provençal poet.
- Victor Rabu (1834–1907), architect, built many churches in Montevideo, Uruguay
- Joseph Chaumié (1849–1919), politician
- Les Lalanne, artists and sculptors François-Xavier Lalanne (1927–2008) and Claude Lalanne (1924–2019).
- Michel Serres (born 1930), philosopher and author
- Jacques Sadoul (born 1934), novelist, book editor and non-fiction author
- Jean Cruguet (born 1939), jockey who won the U.S. Triple Crown of thoroughbred racing
- Alain Aspect (born 1947), physicist and Nobel Prize in Physics winner in 2022
- Francis Cabrel (born 1953), singer-songwriter and guitarist
- Bernard Campan (born 1958), actor, film director and writer
- Emmanuel Flipo (born 1958), artist
- Bernard Andrieu (born 1959, philosopher and historian
- Béatrice Uria-Monzon (1963–2025), mezzo-soprano.
- Stéphane Rideau (born 1976), actor
- Fabien Barcella (born 1983), former rugby union player with 20 caps for France
- Aymeric Laporte (born 1994), footballer with 20 caps for Spain
- Brice Dulin, (born 1990), rugby union player with 36 caps for France.

As residence

- Julius Caesar Scaliger In 1525 he became physician to Antonio della Rovera, bishop of Agen, and remained until his death in 1558.
- Nostradamus lived in Agen from 1531 until at least 1534. He was married to a local woman with whom he had two children.

== Miscellaneous ==
Agen is the "capital of the prune", a local product consumed as a sweet, either stuffed with prune purée or in pastries, or as a dessert, e.g., prunes soaked in Armagnac, a type of brandy. On the last weekend of August, a prune festival comprises rock concerts, circus performances and prune tastings.

== Jewish presence ==
The first Jews settled in the town in the twelfth century AD. They were expelled from the town in 1306. A number of Jews returned to the town in 1315, and a "Rue des Juifs" is documented ever since this period. In 1968, about 600 Jews lived in the town, though most of them had emigrated from North Africa. A Jewish synagogue still exists in the town.

== See also ==
- SU Agen Lot-et-Garonne, a French rugby union club based in Agen
- Agenais, or Agenois, a former province of France
- Tulipa agenensis, a red tulip named after a wild colony growing near the town
