= Saint-Astier =

Saint-Astier may refer to the following places in France:

- Saint-Astier, Dordogne, a commune in the Dordogne department
- Saint-Astier, Lot-et-Garonne, a commune in the Lot-et-Garonne department
