= Savignac-de-Duras =

- Commune
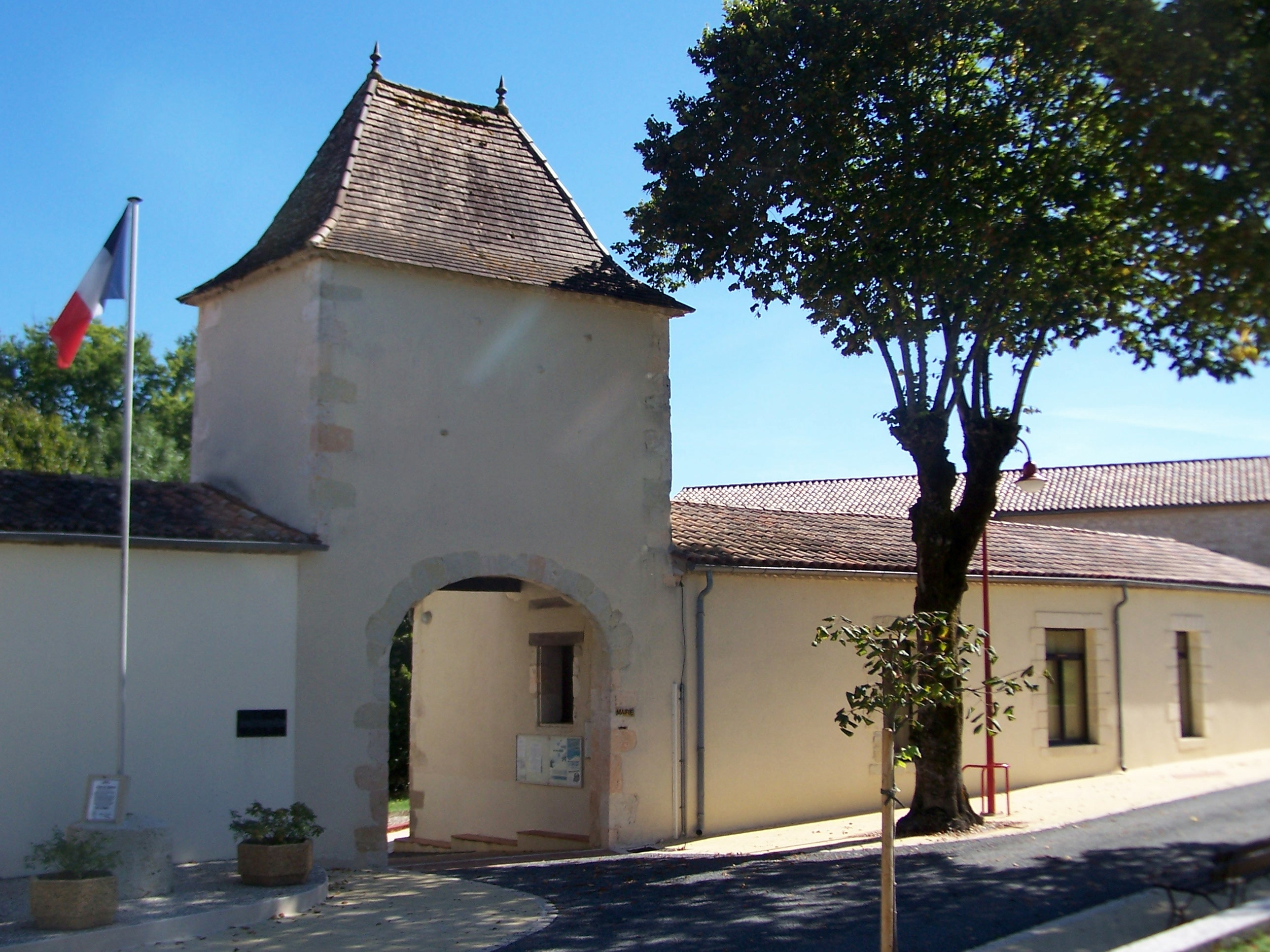
- Savignac-de-Duras Town hall
- Location of Savignac-de-Duras
- Location within France Location within Nouvelle-Aquitaine
- Coordinates: 44°42′06″N 0°11′15″E
- Country: France
- Region: Nouvelle-Aquitaine
- Department: Lot-et-Garonne
- Arrondissement: Marmande
- Canton: Les Coteaux de Guyenne
- Intercommunality: CC Pays de Duras

Government
  - Mayor (2020–2026): Jean-Philippe Penaud
- Area^{1}: 14.89 km^{2} (5.75 sq mi)
- Highest elevation: 126 m (413 ft)
- Lowest elevation: 35 m (115 ft)
- Population (2023): 219
  - Density: 14.7/km^{2} (38.1/sq mi)
- Time zone: UTC+01:00 (CET)
  - Summer (DST): UTC+02:00 (CEST)
- INSEE/Postal code: 47294 /47120
- ^{1} French Land Register data, which excludes lakes, ponds, glaciers > 1 km^{2} (0.386 sq mi or 247 acres) and river estuaries.

Savignac-de-Duras (French pronunciation: [saviɲak də dyʁas], literally Savignac of Duras; Occitan: Savinhac de Duràs) is a commune in the Lot-et-Garonne department in south-western France.

== See also ==
- Communes of the Lot-et-Garonne department
