= Auriac-sur-Dropt =

- Commune
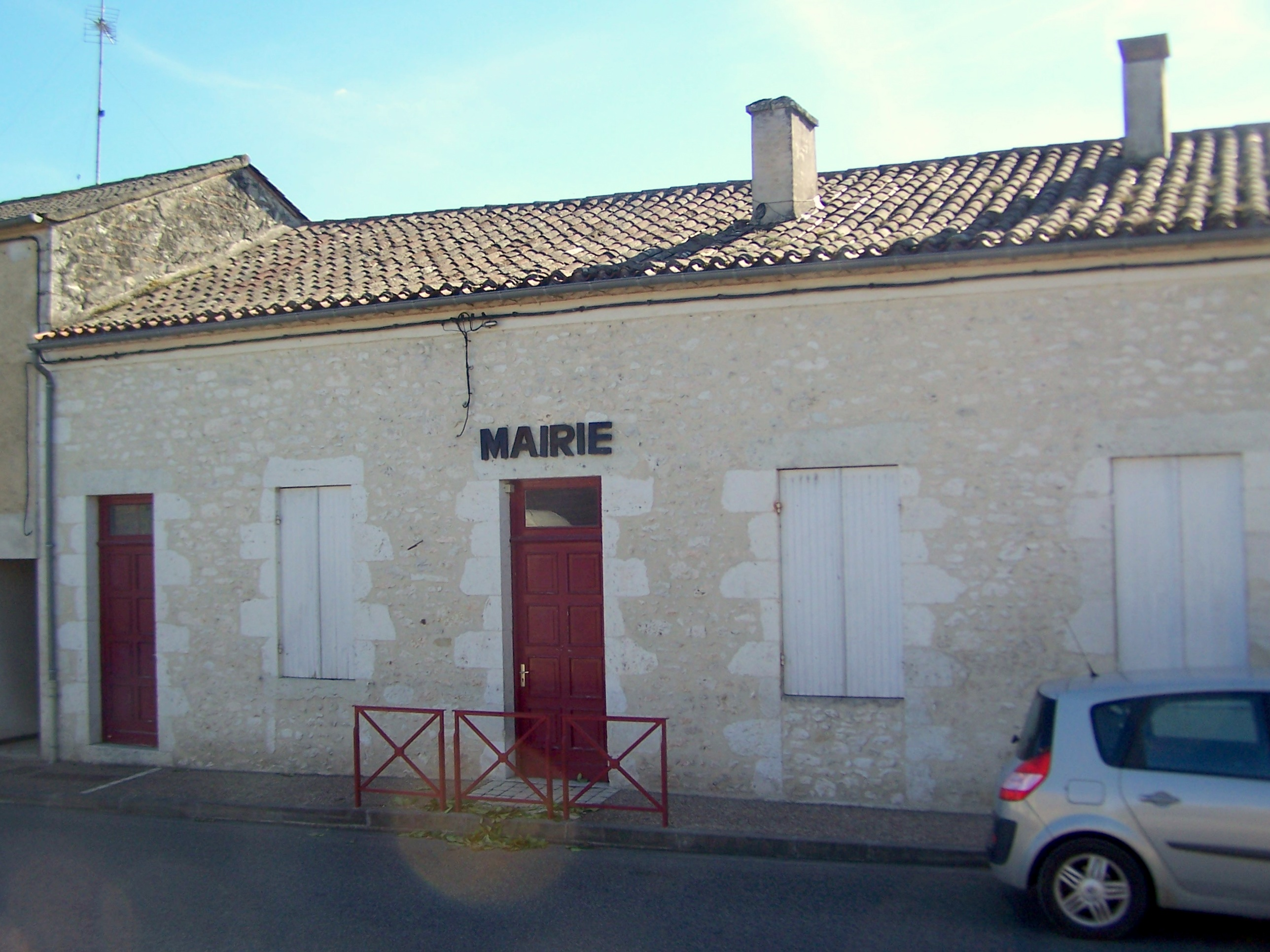
- Location of Auriac-sur-Dropt
- Location within France Location within Nouvelle-Aquitaine
- Coordinates: 44°38′56″N 0°14′46″E
- Country: France
- Region: Nouvelle-Aquitaine
- Department: Lot-et-Garonne
- Arrondissement: Marmande
- Canton: Les Coteaux de Guyenne
- Intercommunality: CC Pays Duras

Government
  - Mayor (2020–2026): Alexandre Da Dalt
- Area^{1}: 5.28 km^{2} (2.04 sq mi)
- Elevation: 43 m (141 ft)
- Highest elevation: 110 m (360 ft)
- Lowest elevation: 29 m (95 ft)
- Population (2023): 175
  - Density: 33.1/km^{2} (85.8/sq mi)
- Time zone: UTC+01:00 (CET)
  - Summer (DST): UTC+02:00 (CEST)
- INSEE/Postal code: 47018 /47120
- ^{1} French Land Register data, which excludes lakes, ponds, glaciers > 1 km^{2} (0.386 sq mi or 247 acres) and river estuaries.

Auriac-sur-Dropt (French pronunciation: [oʁjak syʁ dʁo], literally Auriac on Dropt; Occitan: Auriac de Dròt) is a commune in the Lot-et-Garonne department in southwestern France.

== Population ==
Historical population
Year	Pop.	±% p.a.
1968	244	—
1975	227	−1.03%
1982	200	−1.79%
1990	183	−1.10%
1999	186	+0.18%
2007	200	+0.91%
2012	195	−0.51%
2017	177	−1.92%
2023	175	−0.19%
Source: INSEE

== See also ==
- Communes of the Lot-et-Garonne department
