= La Sauvetat-du-Dropt =

- Commune
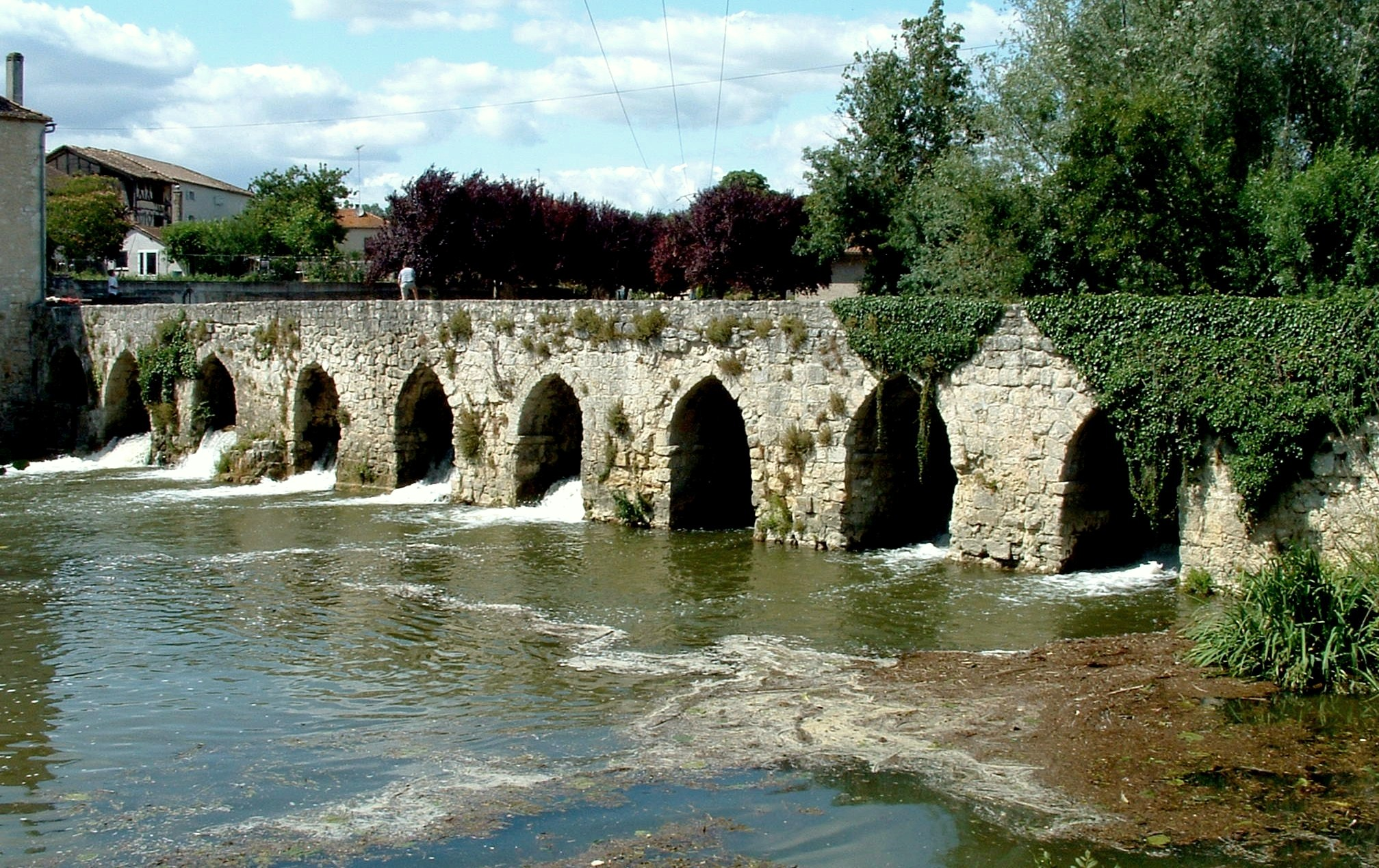
- The old bridge in La Sauvetat-du-Dropt

- Coat of arms
- Location of La Sauvetat-du-Dropt
- Location within France Location within Nouvelle-Aquitaine
- Coordinates: 44°38′53″N 0°20′23″E
- Country: France
- Region: Nouvelle-Aquitaine
- Department: Lot-et-Garonne
- Arrondissement: Marmande
- Canton: Les Coteaux de Guyenne
- Intercommunality: Pays de Lauzun

Government
  - Mayor (2020–2026): Jean-Luc Gardeau
- Area^{1}: 10.37 km^{2} (4.00 sq mi)
- Highest elevation: 123 m (404 ft)
- Lowest elevation: 36 m (118 ft)
- Population (2023): 567
  - Density: 54.7/km^{2} (142/sq mi)
- Time zone: UTC+01:00 (CET)
  - Summer (DST): UTC+02:00 (CEST)
- INSEE/Postal code: 47290 /47800
- ^{1} French Land Register data, which excludes lakes, ponds, glaciers > 1 km^{2} (0.386 sq mi or 247 acres) and river estuaries.

La Sauvetat-du-Dropt (French pronunciation: [la sovta dy dʁo], literally La Sauvetat of the Dropt; Occitan: La Sauvetat de Dròt) is a commune in the Lot-et-Garonne department in south-western France.

== See also ==
- Communes of the Lot-et-Garonne department
