= Saint-Jean-de-Duras =

- Commune
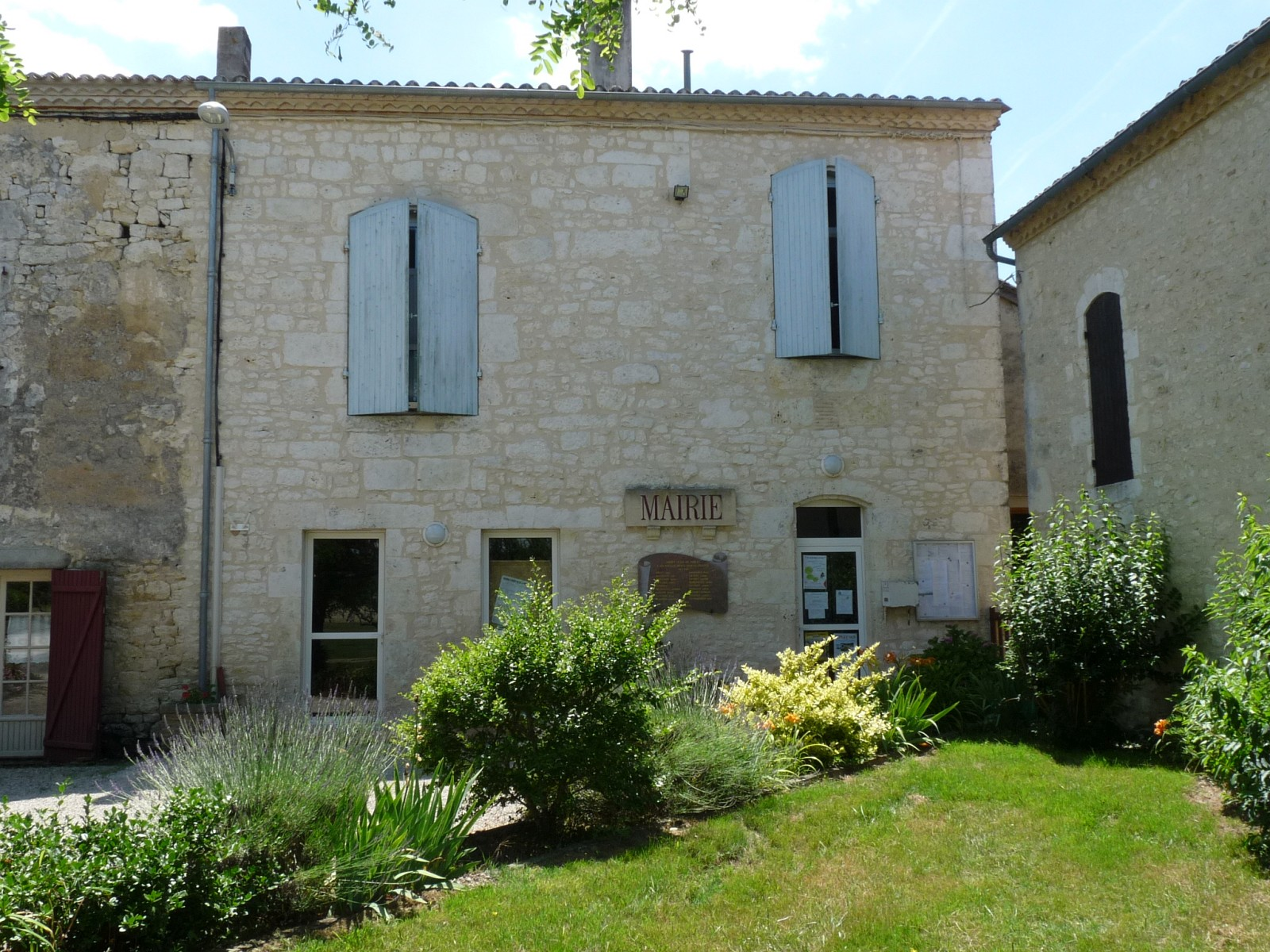
- Saint-Jean-de-Duras Town hall
- Location of Saint-Jean-de-Duras
- Location within France Location within Nouvelle-Aquitaine
- Coordinates: 44°41′43″N 0°17′51″E
- Country: France
- Region: Nouvelle-Aquitaine
- Department: Lot-et-Garonne
- Arrondissement: Marmande
- Canton: Les Coteaux de Guyenne
- Intercommunality: Pays de Duras

Government
  - Mayor (2020–2026): Jean-Luc Carmelli
- Area^{1}: 16.56 km^{2} (6.39 sq mi)
- Elevation: 125 m (410 ft)
- Highest elevation: 173 m (568 ft)
- Lowest elevation: 60 m (200 ft)
- Population (2023): 260
  - Density: 16/km^{2} (41/sq mi)
- Time zone: UTC+01:00 (CET)
  - Summer (DST): UTC+02:00 (CEST)
- INSEE/Postal code: 47247 /47120
- ^{1} French Land Register data, which excludes lakes, ponds, glaciers > 1 km^{2} (0.386 sq mi or 247 acres) and river estuaries.

Saint-Jean-de-Duras (French pronunciation: [sɛ̃ ʒɑ̃ də dyʁas], literally Saint-Jean of Duras; Occitan: Sent Joan de Duràs) is a commune in the Lot-et-Garonne department in south-western France.

== See also ==
- Communes of the Lot-et-Garonne department
