= Sainte-Colombe-de-Duras =

- Commune
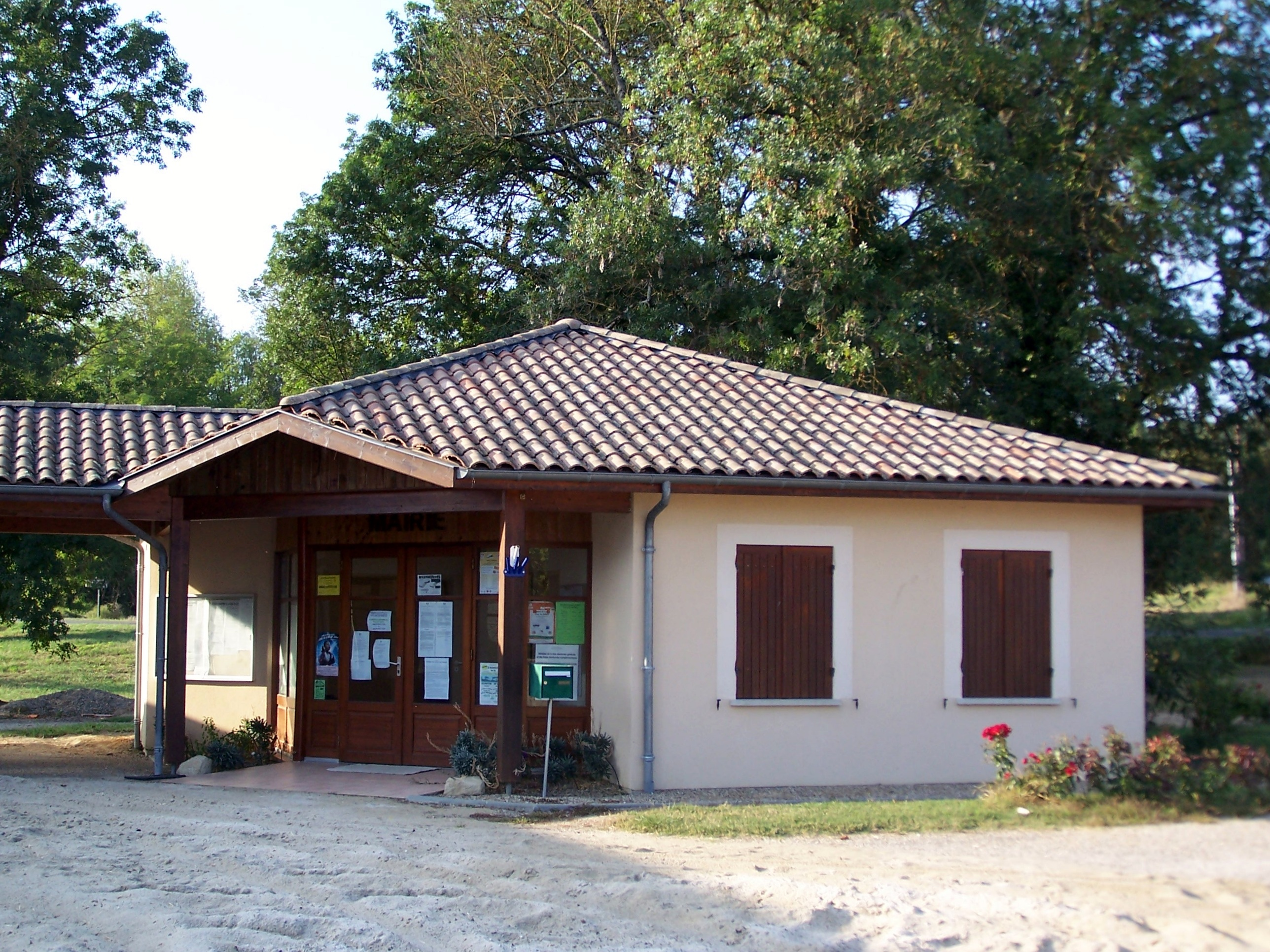
- The town hall in Sainte-Colombe-de-Duras
- Location of Sainte-Colombe-de-Duras
- Location within France Location within Nouvelle-Aquitaine
- Coordinates: 44°41′29″N 0°07′32″E
- Country: France
- Region: Nouvelle-Aquitaine
- Department: Lot-et-Garonne
- Arrondissement: Marmande
- Canton: Les Coteaux de Guyenne
- Intercommunality: Pays de Duras

Government
  - Mayor (2020–2026): Sylvie Wojciechowski-Goulard
- Area^{1}: 6.97 km^{2} (2.69 sq mi)
- Elevation: 68 m (223 ft)
- Highest elevation: 115 m (377 ft)
- Lowest elevation: 32 m (105 ft)
- Population (2023): 98
  - Density: 14/km^{2} (36/sq mi)
- Time zone: UTC+01:00 (CET)
  - Summer (DST): UTC+02:00 (CEST)
- INSEE/Postal code: 47236 /47120
- ^{1} French Land Register data, which excludes lakes, ponds, glaciers > 1 km^{2} (0.386 sq mi or 247 acres) and river estuaries.

Sainte-Colombe-de-Duras (French pronunciation: [sɛ̃t kɔlɔ̃b də dyʁas], literally Sainte-Colombe of Duras; Occitan: Senta Colomba de Duràs) is a commune in the Lot-et-Garonne department in south-western France.

== See also ==
- Communes of the Lot-et-Garonne department
