= Saint-Pierre-sur-Dropt =

- Commune
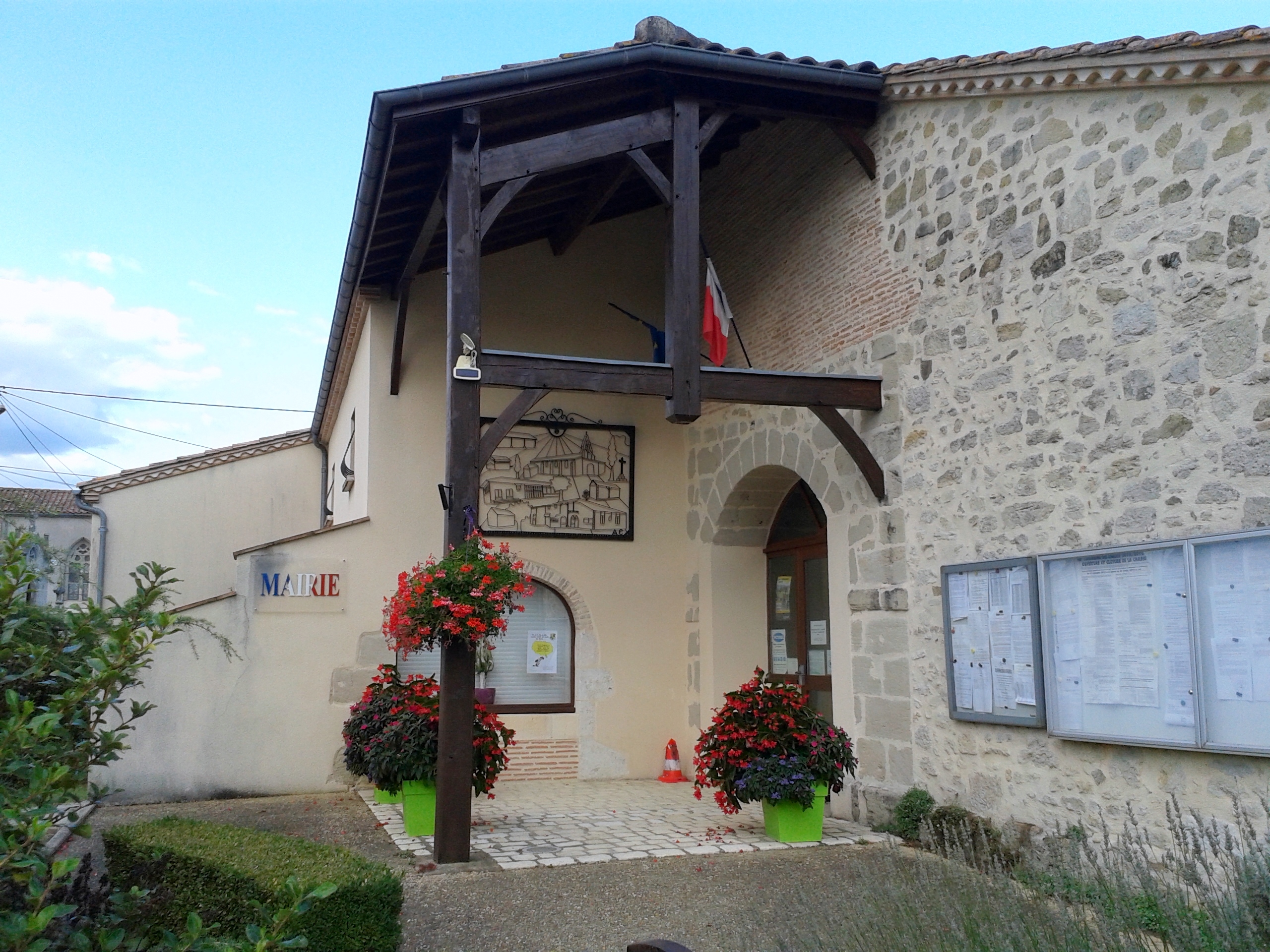
- Saint-Pierre-sur-Dropt Town hall
- Location of Saint-Pierre-sur-Dropt
- Location within France Location within Nouvelle-Aquitaine
- Coordinates: 44°38′38″N 0°12′13″E
- Country: France
- Region: Nouvelle-Aquitaine
- Department: Lot-et-Garonne
- Arrondissement: Marmande
- Canton: Les Coteaux de Guyenne
- Intercommunality: Pays de Duras

Government
  - Mayor (2020–2026): Denis Maurin
- Area^{1}: 8.18 km^{2} (3.16 sq mi)
- Elevation: 100 m (330 ft)
- Highest elevation: 70 m (230 ft)
- Lowest elevation: 28 m (92 ft)
- Population (2023): 359
  - Density: 43.9/km^{2} (114/sq mi)
- Time zone: UTC+01:00 (CET)
  - Summer (DST): UTC+02:00 (CEST)
- INSEE/Postal code: 47271 /47120
- ^{1} French Land Register data, which excludes lakes, ponds, glaciers > 1 km^{2} (0.386 sq mi or 247 acres) and river estuaries.

Saint-Pierre-sur-Dropt (French pronunciation: [sɛ̃ pjɛʁ syʁ dʁo], literally Saint-Pierre on Dropt; Languedocien: Sent Pèir de Dròt) is a commune in the Lot-et-Garonne department in south-western France.

== See also ==
- Communes of the Lot-et-Garonne department
