= Baleyssagues =

- Commune
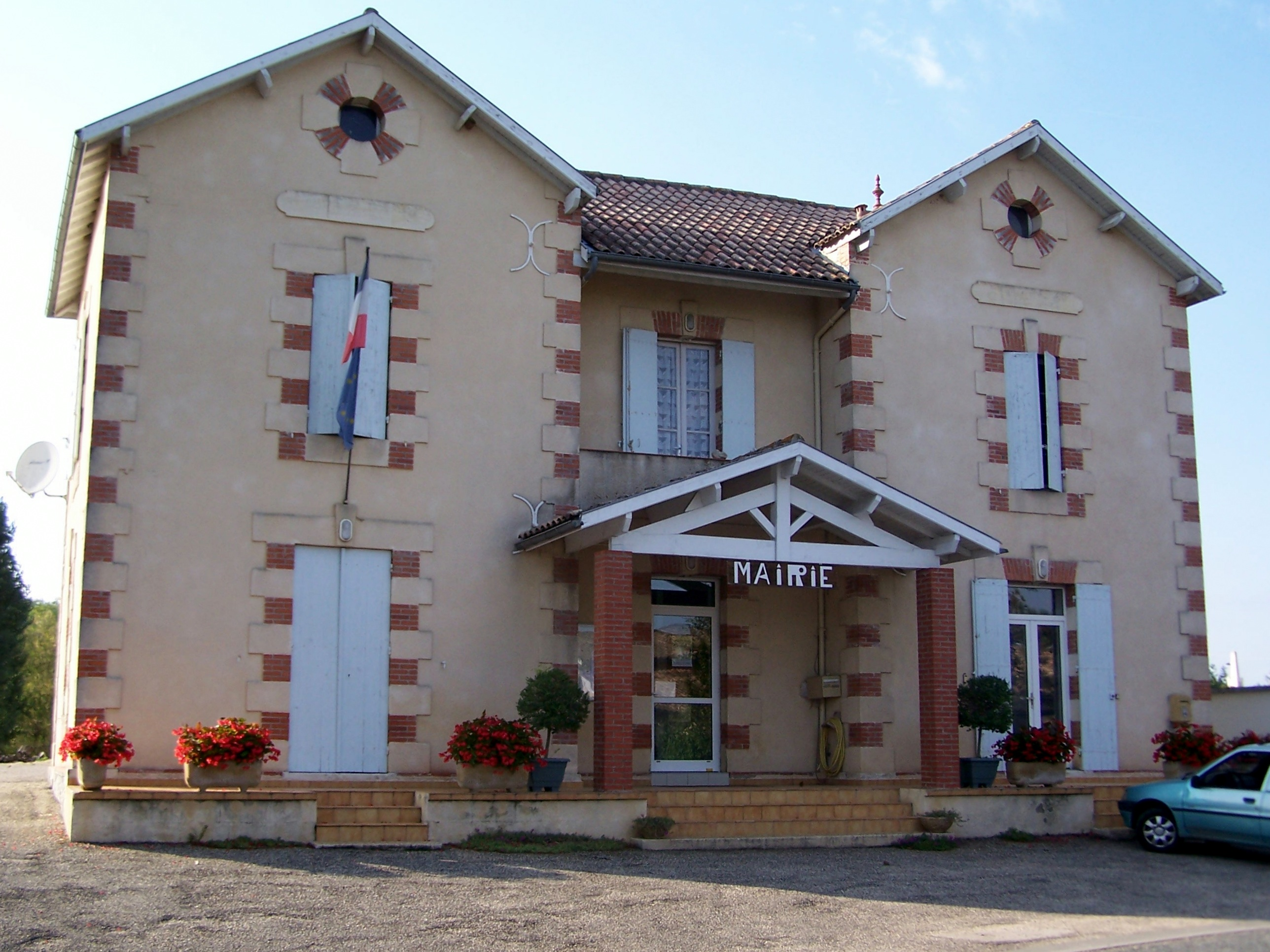
- The town hall in Baleyssagues
- Location of Baleyssagues
- Location within France Location within Nouvelle-Aquitaine
- Coordinates: 44°41′08″N 0°09′20″E
- Country: France
- Region: Nouvelle-Aquitaine
- Department: Lot-et-Garonne
- Arrondissement: Marmande
- Canton: Les Coteaux de Guyenne
- Intercommunality: Pays de Duras

Government
  - Mayor (2020–2026): Roxane Vanrechem-Rossetto
- Area^{1}: 8.18 km^{2} (3.16 sq mi)
- Elevation: 82 m (269 ft)
- Highest elevation: 108 m (354 ft)
- Lowest elevation: 25 m (82 ft)
- Population (2023): 188
  - Density: 23.0/km^{2} (59.5/sq mi)
- Time zone: UTC+01:00 (CET)
  - Summer (DST): UTC+02:00 (CEST)
- INSEE/Postal code: 47020 /47120
- ^{1} French Land Register data, which excludes lakes, ponds, glaciers > 1 km^{2} (0.386 sq mi or 247 acres) and river estuaries.

Baleyssagues is a commune in the Lot-et-Garonne department in southwestern France.

== Population ==
Historical population
Year	Pop.	±% p.a.
1968	217	—
1975	182	−2.48%
1982	189	+0.54%
1990	184	−0.33%
1999	176	−0.49%
2007	203	+1.80%
2012	181	−2.27%
2017	176	−0.56%
2023	188	+1.11%
Source: INSEE

== See also ==
- Communes of the Lot-et-Garonne department
