= Castelnau-sur-Gupie =

- Commune
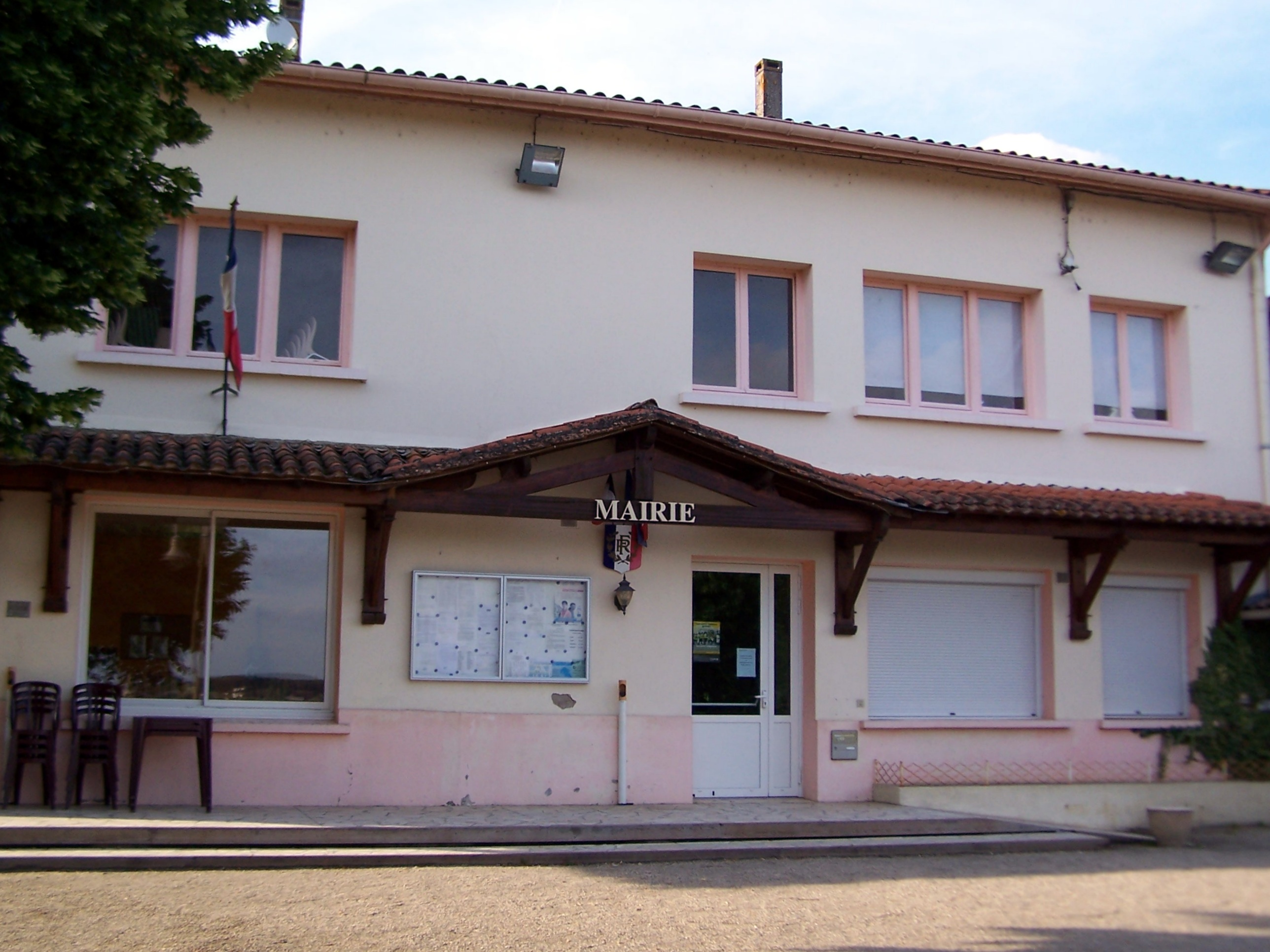
- The town hall in Castelnau-sur-Gupie
- Location of Castelnau-sur-Gupie
- Location within France Location within Nouvelle-Aquitaine
- Coordinates: 44°33′39″N 0°08′00″E
- Country: France
- Region: Nouvelle-Aquitaine
- Department: Lot-et-Garonne
- Arrondissement: Marmande
- Canton: Les Coteaux de Guyenne
- Intercommunality: Val de Garonne Agglomération

Government
  - Mayor (2020–2026): Guy Ianotto
- Area^{1}: 15.23 km^{2} (5.88 sq mi)
- Elevation: 100 m (330 ft)
- Highest elevation: 129 m (423 ft)
- Lowest elevation: 28 m (92 ft)
- Population (2023): 917
  - Density: 60.2/km^{2} (156/sq mi)
- Time zone: UTC+01:00 (CET)
  - Summer (DST): UTC+02:00 (CEST)
- INSEE/Postal code: 47056 /47180
- ^{1} French Land Register data, which excludes lakes, ponds, glaciers > 1 km^{2} (0.386 sq mi or 247 acres) and river estuaries.

Castelnau-sur-Gupie (French pronunciation: [kastɛlno syʁ ɡypi]; Occitan: Castèthnau de Gupia) is a commune in the Lot-et-Garonne department in south-western France.

== See also ==
- Communes of the Lot-et-Garonne department
