= Montignac-Toupinerie =

- Commune
- Location of Montignac-Toupinerie
- Location within France Location within Nouvelle-Aquitaine
- Coordinates: 44°32′57″N 0°20′46″E
- Country: France
- Region: Nouvelle-Aquitaine
- Department: Lot-et-Garonne
- Arrondissement: Marmande
- Canton: Les Coteaux de Guyenne
- Intercommunality: CC Pays de Lauzun

Government
  - Mayor (2020–2026): Christophe Vergné
- Area^{1}: 8.31 km^{2} (3.21 sq mi)
- Elevation: 127 m (417 ft)
- Highest elevation: 137 m (449 ft)
- Lowest elevation: 60 m (200 ft)
- Population (2023): 137
  - Density: 16.5/km^{2} (42.7/sq mi)
- Time zone: UTC+01:00 (CET)
  - Summer (DST): UTC+02:00 (CEST)
- INSEE/Postal code: 47189 /47350
- ^{1} French Land Register data, which excludes lakes, ponds, glaciers > 1 km^{2} (0.386 sq mi or 247 acres) and river estuaries.

Montignac-Toupinerie (French pronunciation: [mɔ̃tiɲak tupinʁi]; Occitan: Montinhac e La Topinariá) is a commune in the Lot-et-Garonne department in south-western France.

== See also ==
- Communes of the Lot-et-Garonne department
