= Cambes, Lot-et-Garonne =

Cambes
- Commune
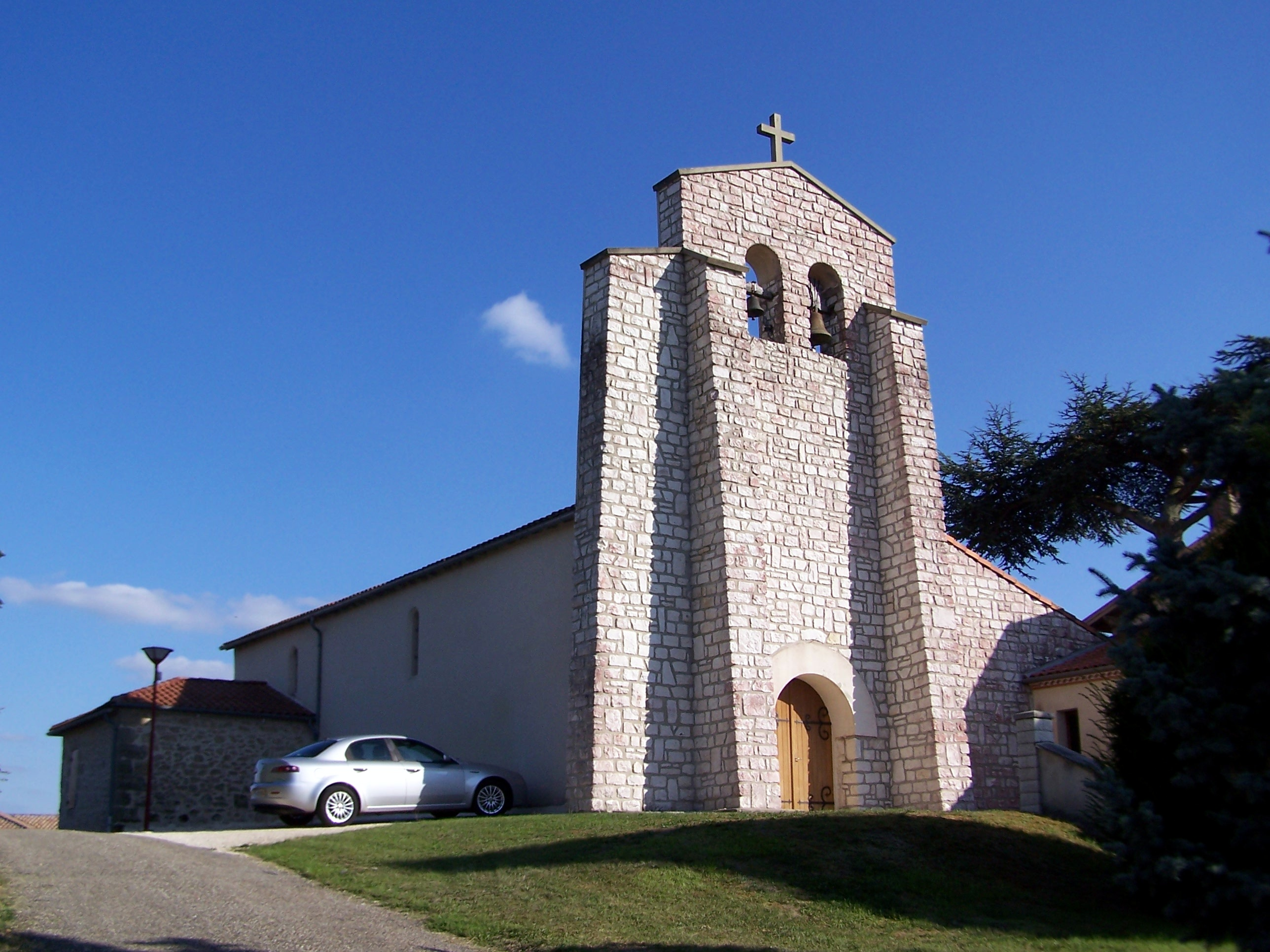
- Location of Cambes
- Location within France Location within Nouvelle-Aquitaine
- Coordinates: 44°35′47″N 0°17′22″E
- Country: France
- Region: Nouvelle-Aquitaine
- Department: Lot-et-Garonne
- Arrondissement: Marmande
- Canton: Les Coteaux de Guyenne
- Intercommunality: CC Pays de Lauzun

Government
  - Mayor (2020–2026): Jean-Claude Raphalen
- Area^{1}: 9.2 km^{2} (3.6 sq mi)
- Elevation: 120 m (390 ft)
- Highest elevation: 132 m (433 ft)
- Lowest elevation: 44 m (144 ft)
- Population (2023): 170
  - Density: 18/km^{2} (48/sq mi)
- Time zone: UTC+01:00 (CET)
  - Summer (DST): UTC+02:00 (CEST)
- INSEE/Postal code: 47047 /47350
- ^{1} French Land Register data, which excludes lakes, ponds, glaciers > 1 km^{2} (0.386 sq mi or 247 acres) and river estuaries.

Cambes (French pronunciation: [kɑ̃b]; Occitan: Cambas) is a commune in the Lot-et-Garonne department in south-western France.

== See also ==
- Communes of the Lot-et-Garonne department
