= Escassefort =

- Commune
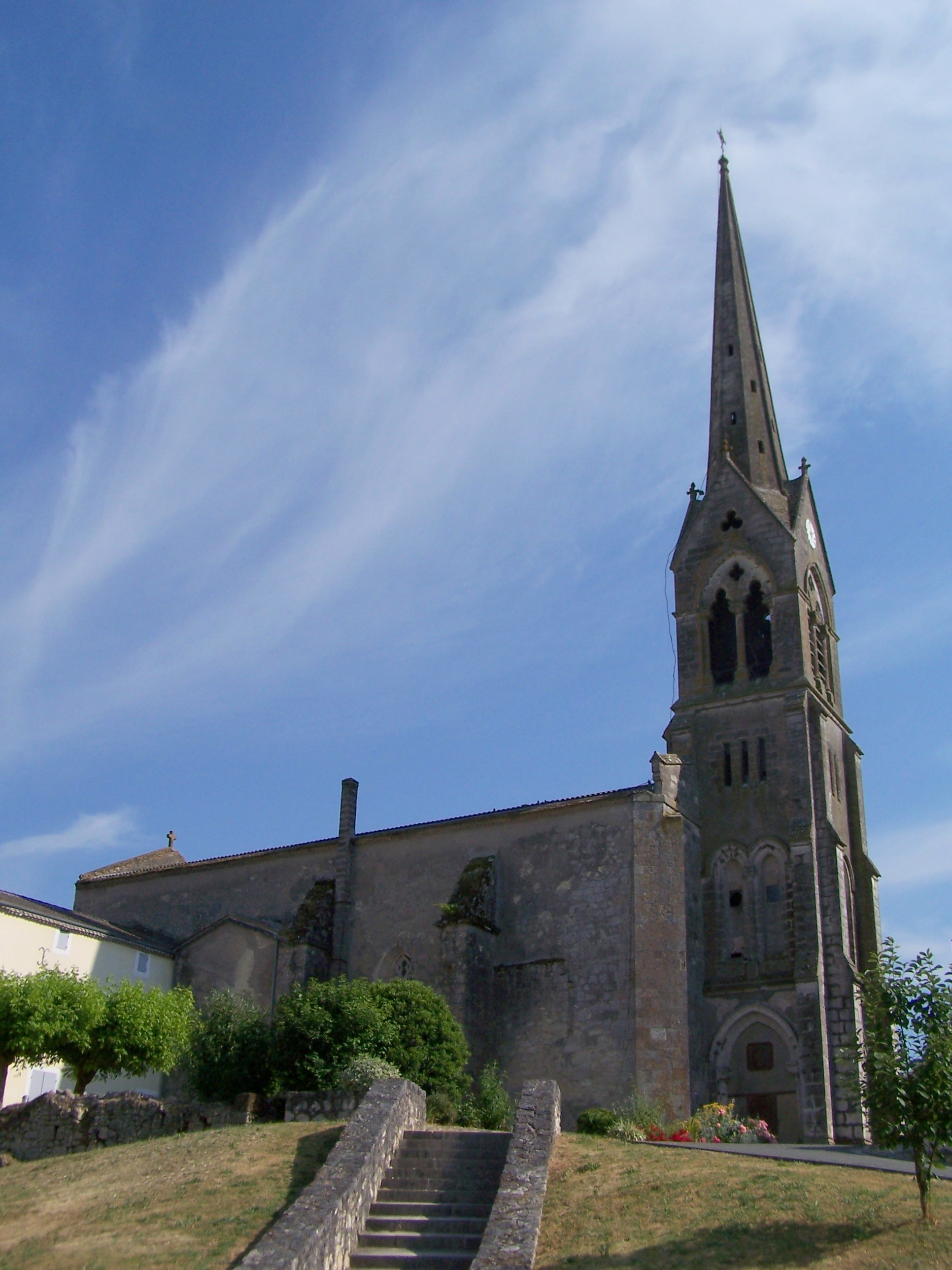
- Location of Escassefort
- Location within France Location within Nouvelle-Aquitaine
- Coordinates: 44°32′57″N 0°14′18″E
- Country: France
- Region: Nouvelle-Aquitaine
- Department: Lot-et-Garonne
- Arrondissement: Marmande
- Canton: Les Coteaux de Guyenne
- Intercommunality: Val de Garonne Agglomération

Government
  - Mayor (2020–2026): Claude Lalande
- Area^{1}: 13.92 km^{2} (5.37 sq mi)
- Elevation: 132 m (433 ft)
- Highest elevation: 141 m (463 ft)
- Lowest elevation: 42 m (138 ft)
- Population (2023): 682
  - Density: 49.0/km^{2} (127/sq mi)
- Time zone: UTC+01:00 (CET)
  - Summer (DST): UTC+02:00 (CEST)
- INSEE/Postal code: 47088 /47350
- ^{1} French Land Register data, which excludes lakes, ponds, glaciers > 1 km^{2} (0.386 sq mi or 247 acres) and river estuaries.

Escassefort (French pronunciation: [ɛskasfɔʁ]; Occitan: Escassafòrt) is a commune in the Lot-et-Garonne department in south-western France.

== See also ==
- Communes of the Lot-et-Garonne department
