= Canton of Les Coteaux de Guyenne =

Coordinates: 44.68°N 0.18°E

The canton of Les Coteaux de Guyenne is an administrative division of the Lot-et-Garonne department, southwestern France. It was created at the French canton reorganisation which came into effect in March 2015. Its seat is in Duras.

It consists of the following communes:

1. Agmé
2. Auriac-sur-Dropt
3. Baleyssagues
4. Cambes
5. Castelnau-sur-Gupie
6. Caubon-Saint-Sauveur
7. Duras
8. Escassefort
9. Esclottes
10. Jusix
11. Lachapelle
12. Lagupie
13. Lévignac-de-Guyenne
14. Loubès-Bernac
15. Mauvezin-sur-Gupie
16. Monteton
17. Montignac-Toupinerie
18. Moustier
19. Pardaillan
20. Puymiclan
21. Saint-Astier
22. Saint-Avit
23. Saint-Barthélemy-d'Agenais
24. Sainte-Colombe-de-Duras
25. Saint-Géraud
26. Saint-Jean-de-Duras
27. Saint-Martin-Petit
28. Saint-Pierre-sur-Dropt
29. Saint-Sernin
30. La Sauvetat-du-Dropt
31. Savignac-de-Duras
32. Seyches
33. Soumensac
34. Villeneuve-de-Duras
