= Villeneuve-de-Duras =

- Commune
- Location of Villeneuve-de-Duras
- Location within France Location within Nouvelle-Aquitaine
- Coordinates: 44°44′30″N 0°14′17″E
- Country: France
- Region: Nouvelle-Aquitaine
- Department: Lot-et-Garonne
- Arrondissement: Marmande
- Canton: Les Coteaux de Guyenne
- Intercommunality: CC Pays de Duras

Government
  - Mayor (2020–2026): Régis Bertrand
- Area^{1}: 11.81 km^{2} (4.56 sq mi)
- Elevation: 125 m (410 ft)
- Highest elevation: 131 m (430 ft)
- Lowest elevation: 54 m (177 ft)
- Population (2023): 315
  - Density: 26.7/km^{2} (69.1/sq mi)
- Time zone: UTC+01:00 (CET)
  - Summer (DST): UTC+02:00 (CEST)
- INSEE/Postal code: 47321 /47120
- ^{1} French Land Register data, which excludes lakes, ponds, glaciers > 1 km^{2} (0.386 sq mi or 247 acres) and river estuaries.

Villeneuve-de-Duras (French pronunciation: [vilnœv də dyʁas]; Occitan: Vilanuèva de Duràs) is a commune in the Lot-et-Garonne department in the southwestern portion of France.

== See also ==
- Communes of the Lot-et-Garonne department
