= Lagupie =

- Commune
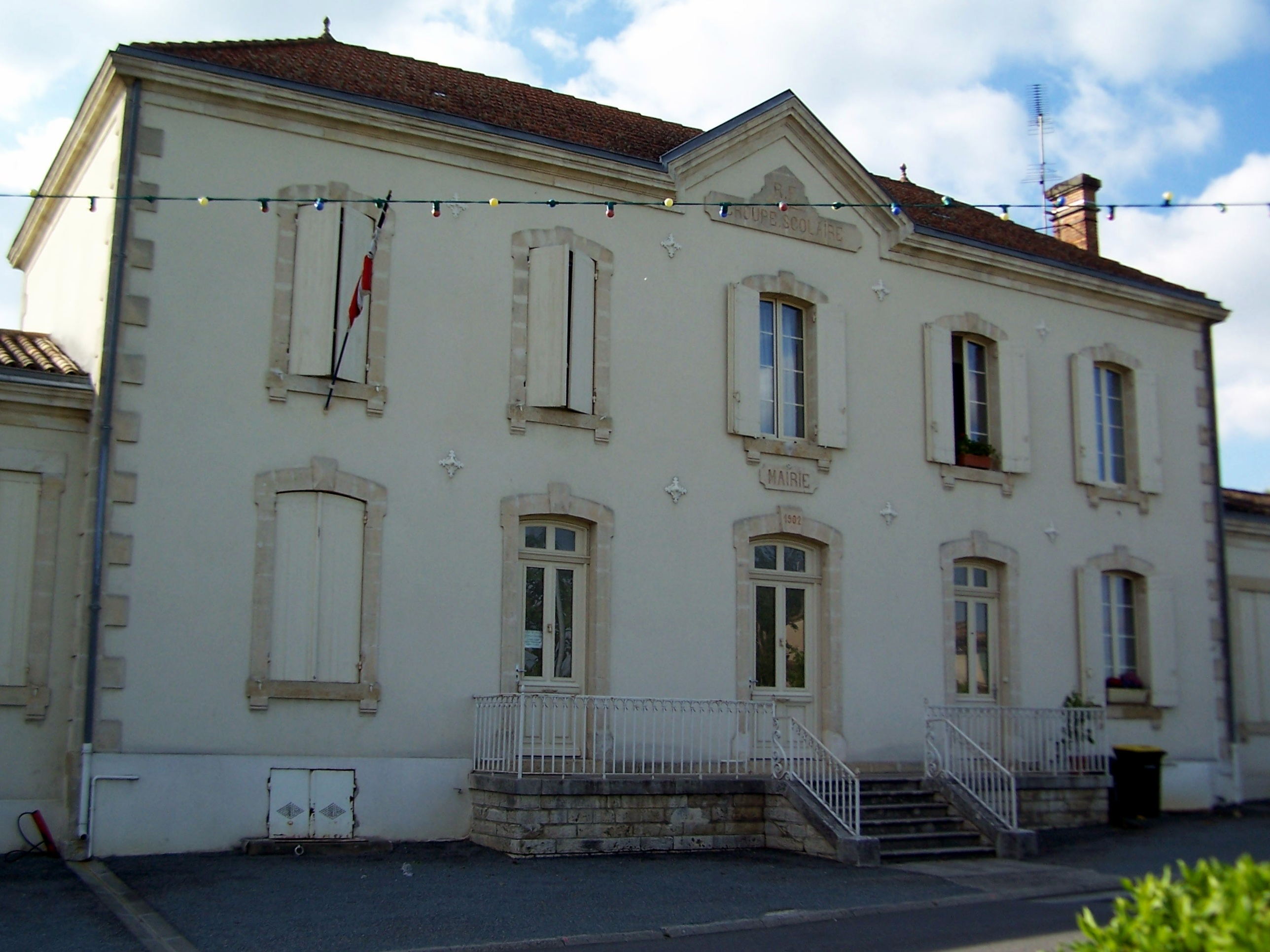
- The town hall in Lagupie
- Location of Lagupie
- Location within France Location within Nouvelle-Aquitaine
- Coordinates: 44°33′27″N 0°06′56″E
- Country: France
- Region: Nouvelle-Aquitaine
- Department: Lot-et-Garonne
- Arrondissement: Marmande
- Canton: Les Coteaux de Guyenne
- Intercommunality: Val de Garonne Agglomération

Government
  - Mayor (2020–2026): Anne-Marie Chaumont
- Area^{1}: 8.69 km^{2} (3.36 sq mi)
- Elevation: 29 m (95 ft)
- Highest elevation: 121 m (397 ft)
- Lowest elevation: 20 m (66 ft)
- Population (2023): 680
  - Density: 78/km^{2} (200/sq mi)
- Time zone: UTC+01:00 (CET)
  - Summer (DST): UTC+02:00 (CEST)
- INSEE/Postal code: 47131 /47180
- ^{1} French Land Register data, which excludes lakes, ponds, glaciers > 1 km^{2} (0.386 sq mi or 247 acres) and river estuaries.

Lagupie (French pronunciation: [laɡupi]; Occitan: Lagupia) is a commune in the Lot-et-Garonne department in south-western France.

== See also ==
- Communes of the Lot-et-Garonne department
