= Lachapelle, Lot-et-Garonne =

Lachapelle
- Commune
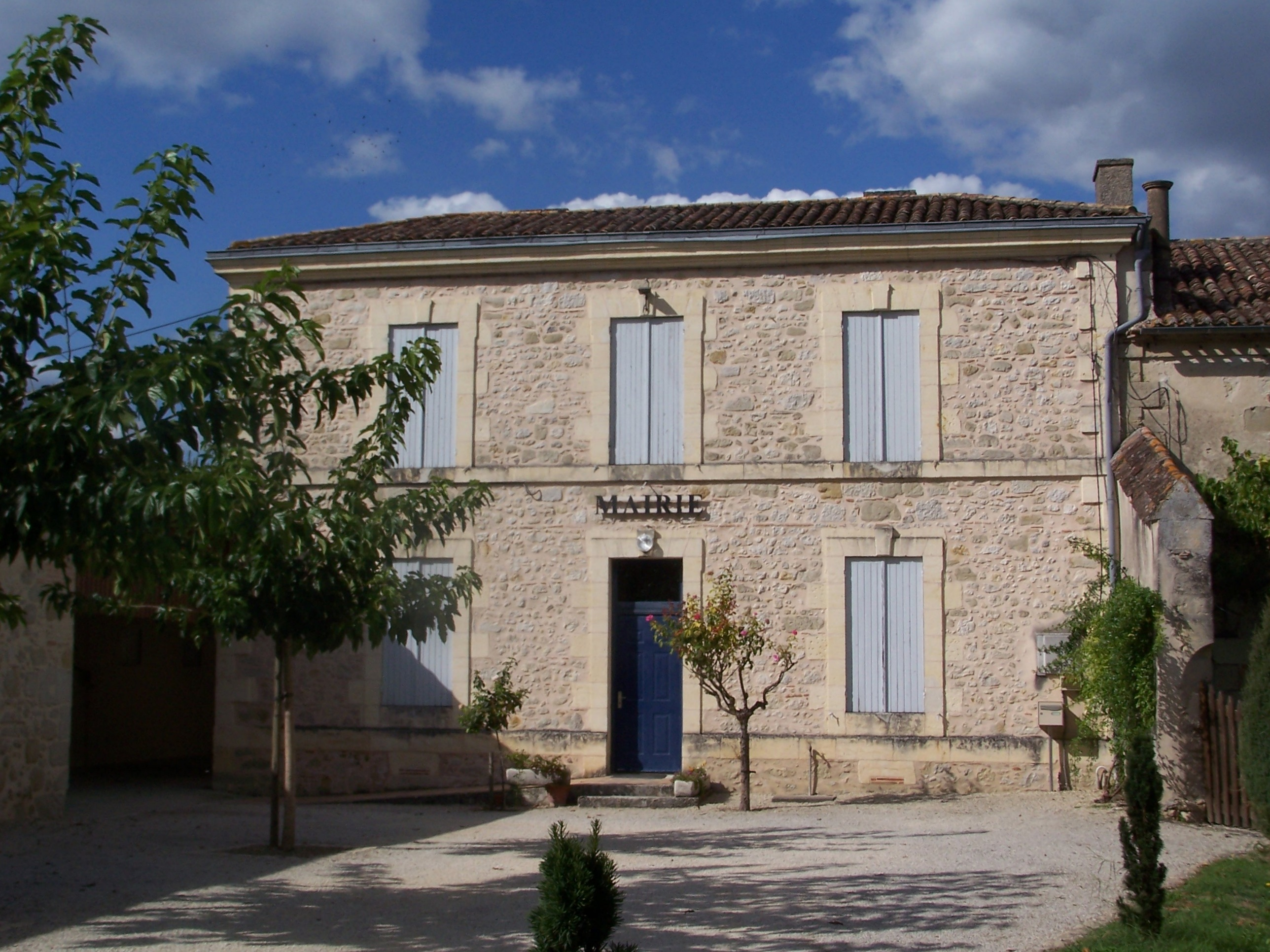
- Town hall
- Location of Lachapelle
- Location within France Location within Nouvelle-Aquitaine
- Coordinates: 44°34′35″N 0°15′49″E
- Country: France
- Region: Nouvelle-Aquitaine
- Department: Lot-et-Garonne
- Arrondissement: Marmande
- Canton: Les Coteaux de Guyenne

Government
  - Mayor (2020–2026): Marie Corbel
- Area^{1}: 4.53 km^{2} (1.75 sq mi)
- Elevation: 111 m (364 ft)
- Highest elevation: 132 m (433 ft)
- Lowest elevation: 52 m (171 ft)
- Population (2023): 96
  - Density: 21/km^{2} (55/sq mi)
- Time zone: UTC+01:00 (CET)
  - Summer (DST): UTC+02:00 (CEST)
- INSEE/Postal code: 47126 /47350
- ^{1} French Land Register data, which excludes lakes, ponds, glaciers > 1 km^{2} (0.386 sq mi or 247 acres) and river estuaries.

Lachapelle (French pronunciation: [laʃapɛl]; Occitan: La Capèla) is a commune in the Lot-et-Garonne department in south-western France.

== See also ==
- Communes of the Lot-et-Garonne department
