= Jusix =

- Commune
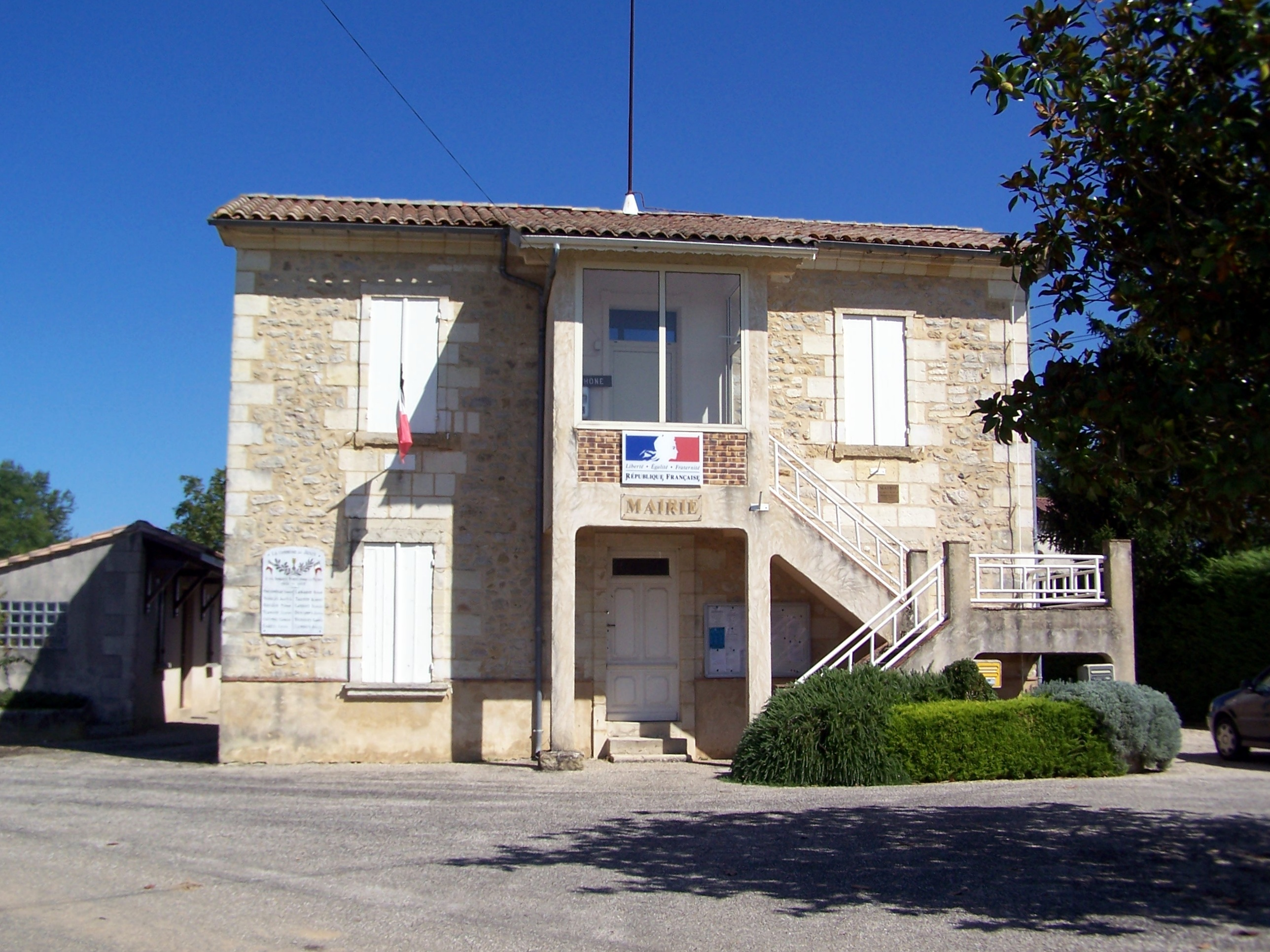
- The town hall in Jusix

- Coat of arms
- Location of Jusix
- Location within France Location within Nouvelle-Aquitaine
- Coordinates: 44°32′28″N 0°03′01″E
- Country: France
- Region: Nouvelle-Aquitaine
- Department: Lot-et-Garonne
- Arrondissement: Marmande
- Canton: Les Coteaux de Guyenne
- Intercommunality: Val de Garonne Agglomération

Government
  - Mayor (2020–2026): Laurent Capelle
- Area^{1}: 7.5 km^{2} (2.9 sq mi)
- Elevation: 7 m (23 ft)
- Highest elevation: 19 m (62 ft)
- Lowest elevation: 12 m (39 ft)
- Population (2023): 96
  - Density: 13/km^{2} (33/sq mi)
- Time zone: UTC+01:00 (CET)
  - Summer (DST): UTC+02:00 (CEST)
- INSEE/Postal code: 47120 /47180
- ^{1} French Land Register data, which excludes lakes, ponds, glaciers > 1 km^{2} (0.386 sq mi or 247 acres) and river estuaries.

Jusix is a commune in the Lot-et-Garonne department in south-western France.

== See also ==
- Communes of the Lot-et-Garonne department
