= Lévignac-de-Guyenne =

- Commune
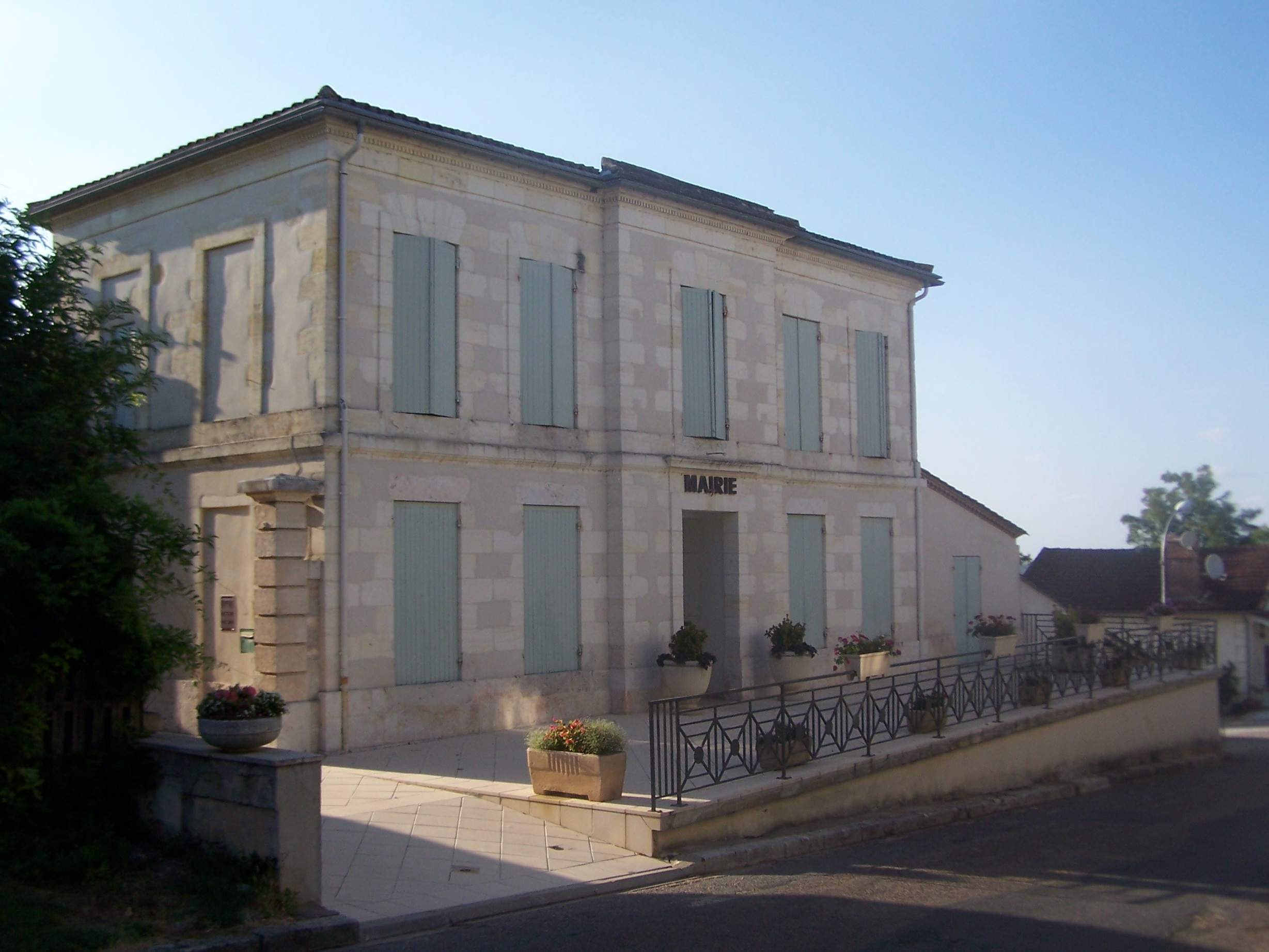
- Location of Lévignac-de-Guyenne
- Location within France Location within Nouvelle-Aquitaine
- Coordinates: 44°37′50″N 0°12′00″E
- Country: France
- Region: Nouvelle-Aquitaine
- Department: Lot-et-Garonne
- Arrondissement: Marmande
- Canton: Les Coteaux de Guyenne
- Intercommunality: CC Pays de Duras

Government
  - Mayor (2020–2026): Jean-Paul Berry
- Area^{1}: 25.02 km^{2} (9.66 sq mi)
- Elevation: 108 m (354 ft)
- Highest elevation: 122 m (400 ft)
- Lowest elevation: 32 m (105 ft)
- Population (2023): 674
  - Density: 26.9/km^{2} (69.8/sq mi)
- Time zone: UTC+01:00 (CET)
  - Summer (DST): UTC+02:00 (CEST)
- INSEE/Postal code: 47147 /47120
- ^{1} French Land Register data, which excludes lakes, ponds, glaciers > 1 km^{2} (0.386 sq mi or 247 acres) and river estuaries.

Lévignac-de-Guyenne (French pronunciation: [leviɲak də ɡɥijɛn], literally Lévignac of Guyenne; Occitan: Levinhac) is a commune in the Lot-et-Garonne department in south-western France.

== See also ==
- Communes of the Lot-et-Garonne department
