= Puymiclan =

- Commune
- Location of Puymiclan
- Location within France Location within Nouvelle-Aquitaine
- Coordinates: 44°30′46″N 0°19′00″E
- Country: France
- Region: Nouvelle-Aquitaine
- Department: Lot-et-Garonne
- Arrondissement: Marmande
- Canton: Les Coteaux de Guyenne
- Intercommunality: Val de Garonne Agglomération

Government
  - Mayor (2020–2026): Christine de Nadaï (née Saudel)
- Area^{1}: 25.74 km^{2} (9.94 sq mi)
- Elevation: 85 m (279 ft)
- Highest elevation: 126 m (413 ft)
- Lowest elevation: 42 m (138 ft)
- Population (2023): 701
  - Density: 27.2/km^{2} (70.5/sq mi)
- Time zone: UTC+01:00 (CET)
  - Summer (DST): UTC+02:00 (CEST)
- INSEE/Postal code: 47216 /47350
- ^{1} French Land Register data, which excludes lakes, ponds, glaciers > 1 km^{2} (0.386 sq mi or 247 acres) and river estuaries.

Puymiclan (French pronunciation: [pɥimiklɑ̃]; Occitan: Pugmiclan) is a landlocked commune in the Lot-et-Garonne department in south-western France.

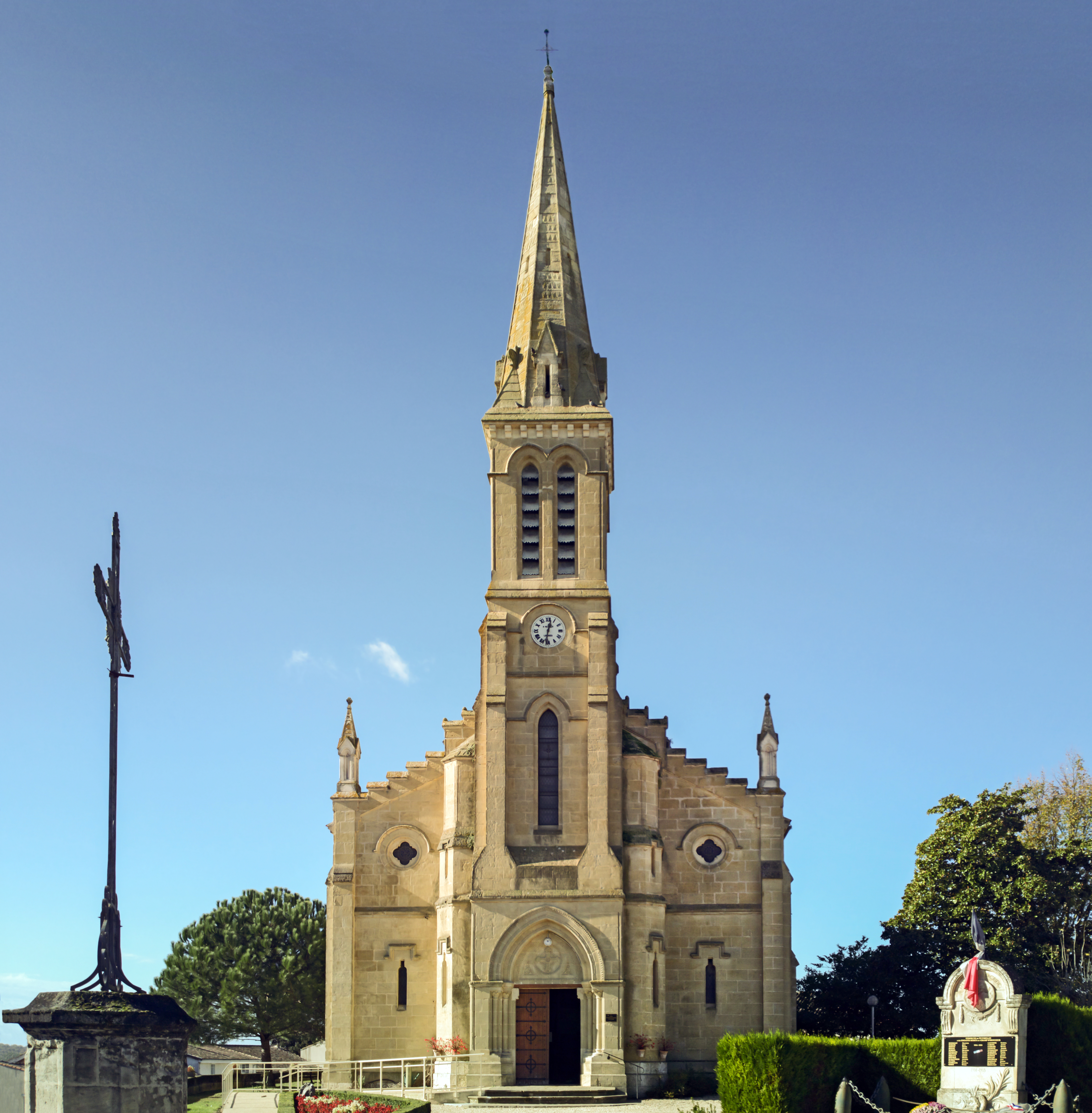
Church Notre-Dame-des-Pins

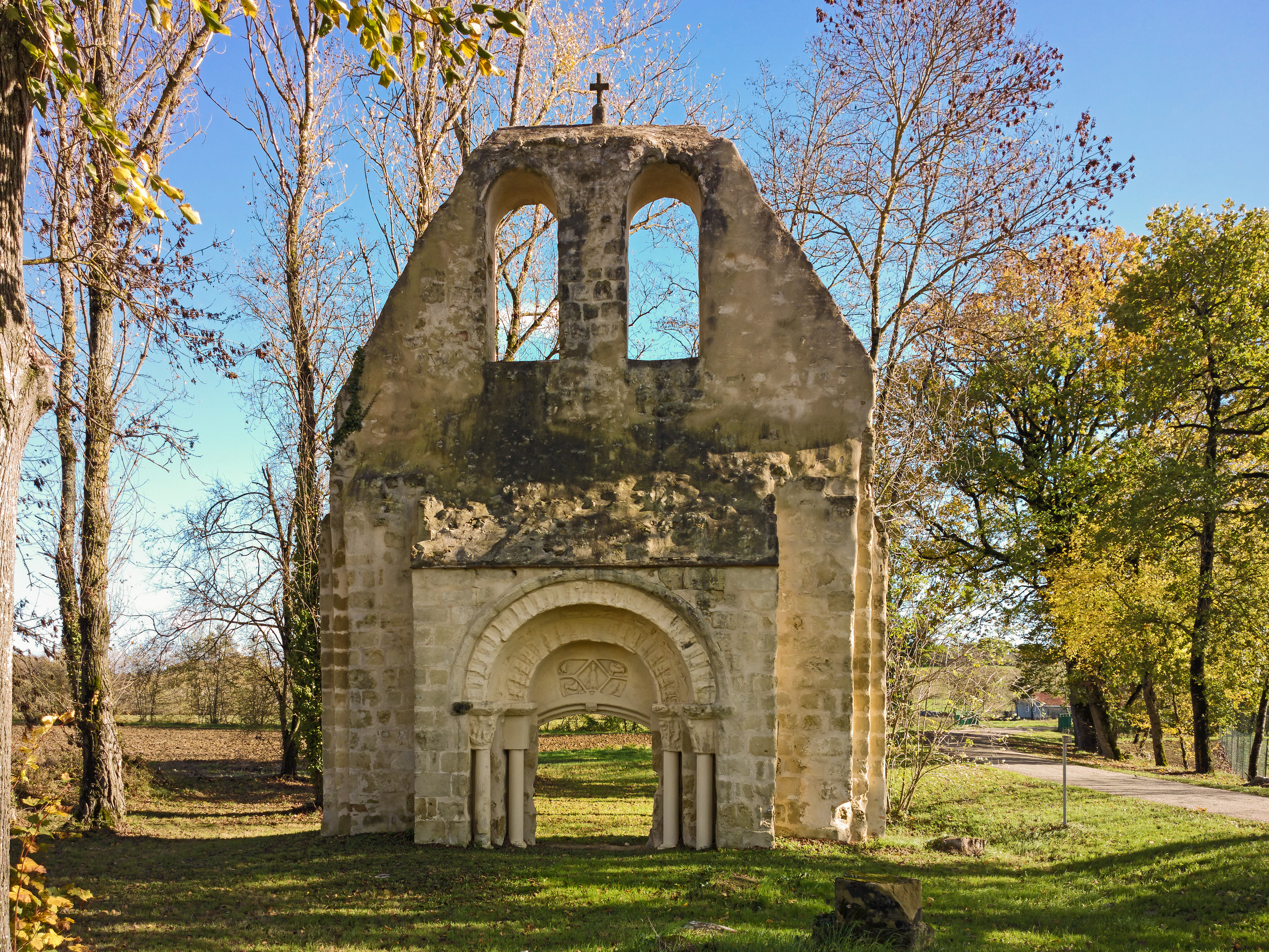
Church of SaintPierre-de-Londres

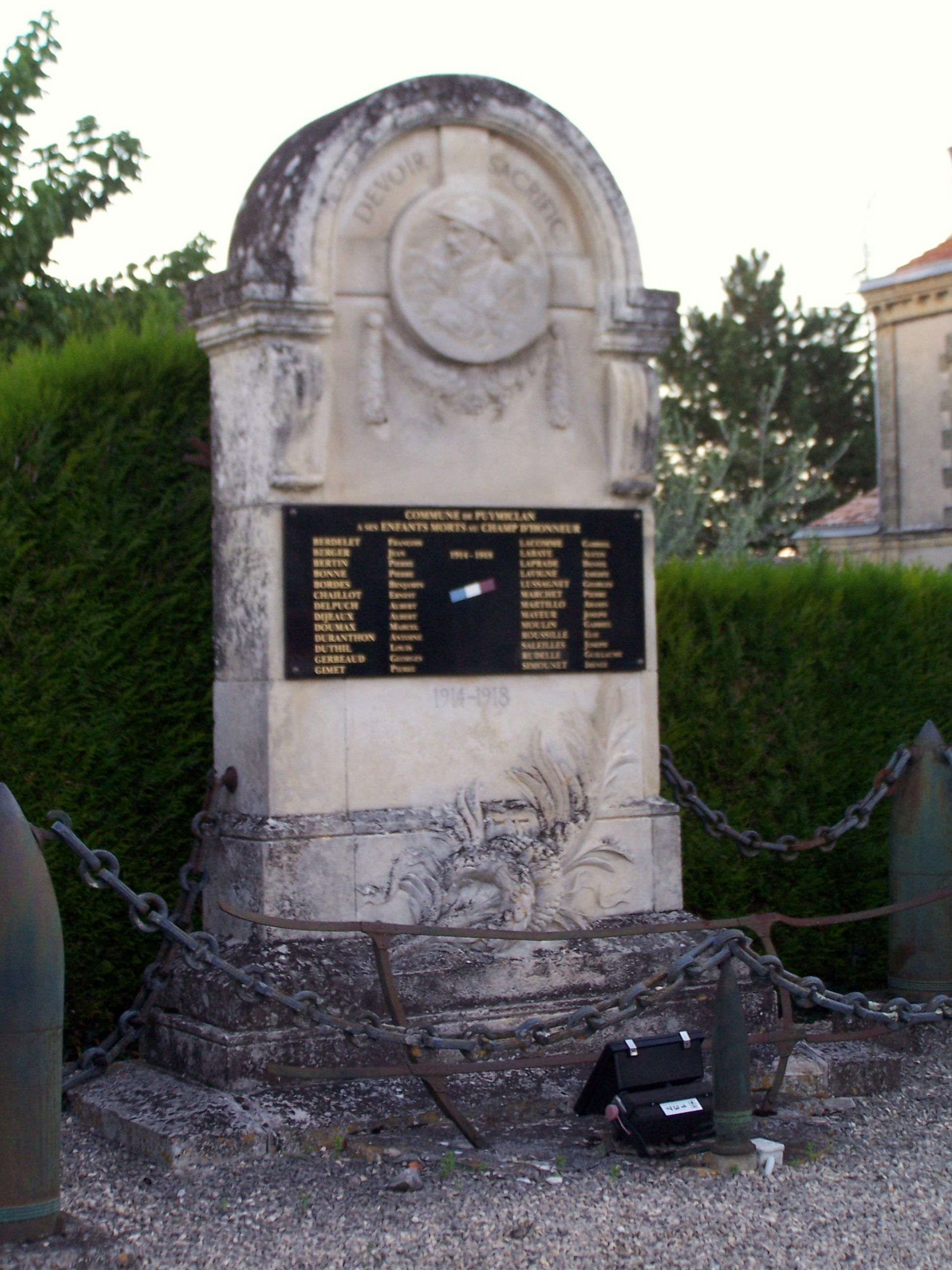
war Memorial

== See also ==
- Communes of the Lot-et-Garonne department
