= Agmé =

- Commune
- Location of Agmé
- Location within France Location within Nouvelle-Aquitaine
- Coordinates: 44°29′29″N 0°20′49″E
- Country: France
- Region: Nouvelle-Aquitaine
- Department: Lot-et-Garonne
- Arrondissement: Marmande
- Canton: Les Coteaux de Guyenne
- Intercommunality: Val de Garonne Agglomération

Government
  - Mayor (2020–2026): Jérôme Bissieres
- Area^{1}: 5.01 km^{2} (1.93 sq mi)
- Elevation: 70 m (230 ft)
- Highest elevation: 116 m (381 ft)
- Lowest elevation: 48 m (157 ft)
- Population (2023): 108
  - Density: 21.6/km^{2} (55.8/sq mi)
- Time zone: UTC+01:00 (CET)
  - Summer (DST): UTC+02:00 (CEST)
- INSEE/Postal code: 47002 /47350
- ^{1} French Land Register data, which excludes lakes, ponds, glaciers > 1 km^{2} (0.386 sq mi or 247 acres) and river estuaries.

Agmé (French pronunciation: [aɡme]; Occitan: Agmèr) is a commune of the Lot-et-Garonne department in southwestern France.

== Population ==
Historical population
Year	Pop.	±% p.a.
1968	134	—
1975	123	−1.22%
1982	113	−1.20%
1990	110	−0.34%
1999	102	−0.84%
2007	111	+1.06%
2012	134	+3.84%
2017	104	−4.94%
2023	108	+0.63%
Source: INSEE

== See also ==
- Communes of the Lot-et-Garonne department
