= Caubon-Saint-Sauveur =

- Commune
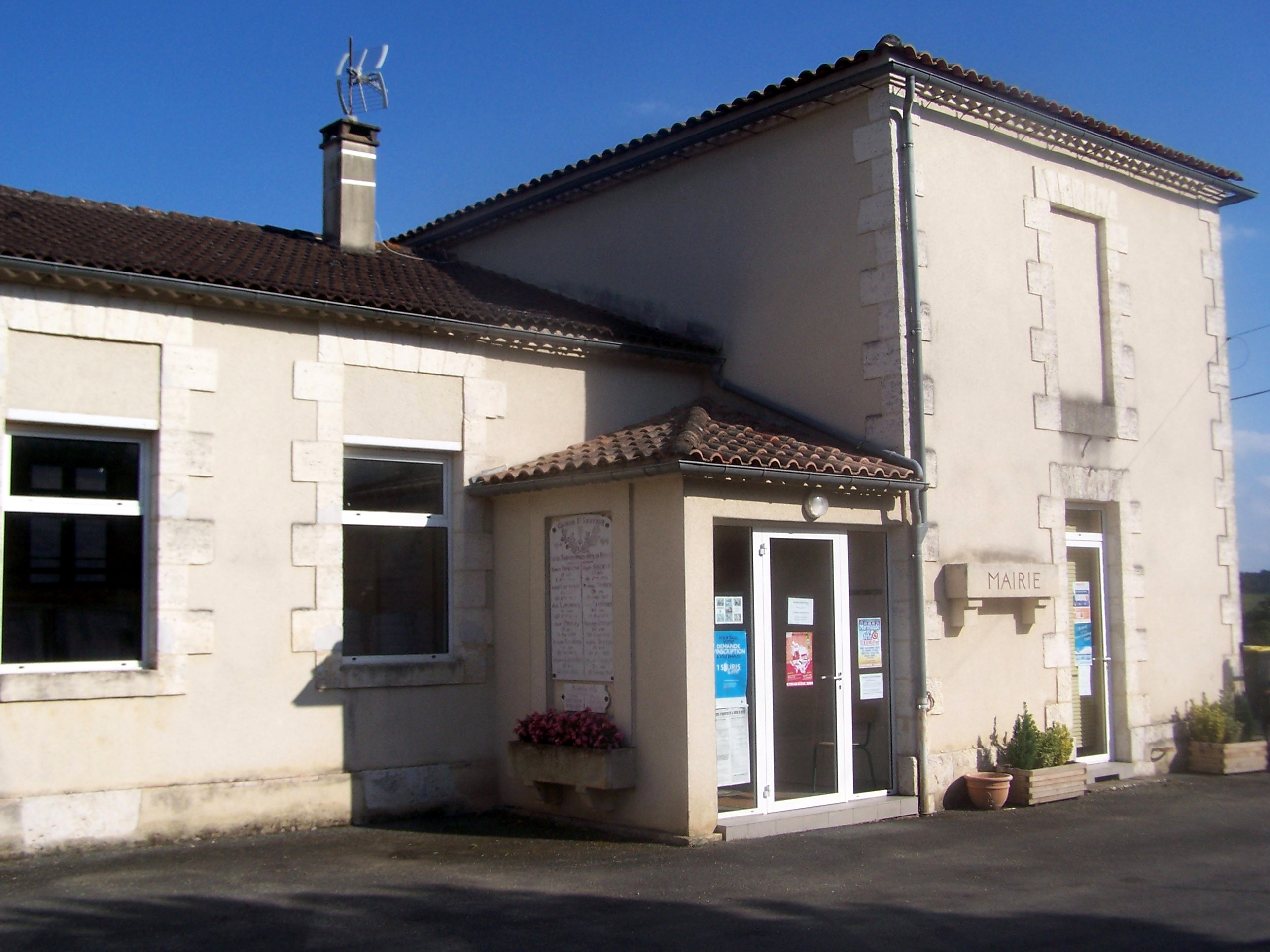
- Location of Caubon-Saint-Sauveur
- Location within France Location within Nouvelle-Aquitaine
- Coordinates: 44°35′37″N 0°10′37″E
- Country: France
- Region: Nouvelle-Aquitaine
- Department: Lot-et-Garonne
- Arrondissement: Marmande
- Canton: Les Coteaux de Guyenne
- Intercommunality: Val de Garonne Agglomération

Government
  - Mayor (2020–2026): Catherine Bernard
- Area^{1}: 11.34 km^{2} (4.38 sq mi)
- Elevation: 100 m (330 ft)
- Highest elevation: 132 m (433 ft)
- Lowest elevation: 42 m (138 ft)
- Population (2023): 261
  - Density: 23.0/km^{2} (59.6/sq mi)
- Time zone: UTC+01:00 (CET)
  - Summer (DST): UTC+02:00 (CEST)
- INSEE/Postal code: 47059 /47120
- ^{1} French Land Register data, which excludes lakes, ponds, glaciers > 1 km^{2} (0.386 sq mi or 247 acres) and river estuaries.

Caubon-Saint-Sauveur (French pronunciation: [kobɔ̃ sɛ̃ sovœʁ]; Gascon: Caubon e Sent Sauvador) is a commune in the Lot-et-Garonne department in south-western France.

== See also ==
- Communes of the Lot-et-Garonne department
