= Saint-Sernin, Lot-et-Garonne =

Saint-Sernin
- Commune
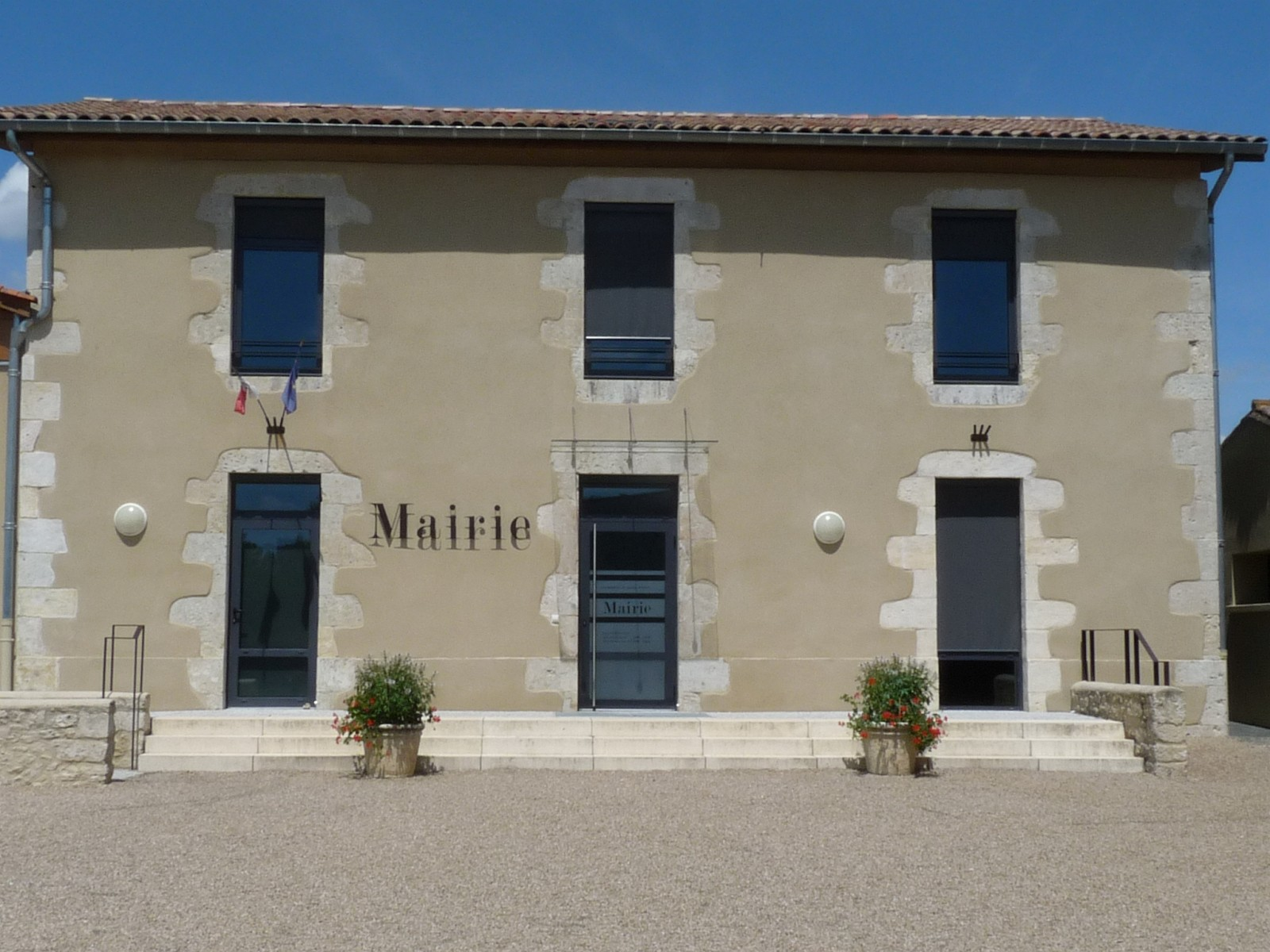
- Town hall

- Coat of arms
- Location of Saint-Sernin
- Location within France Location within Nouvelle-Aquitaine
- Coordinates: 44°42′43″N 0°14′22″E
- Country: France
- Region: Nouvelle-Aquitaine
- Department: Lot-et-Garonne
- Arrondissement: Marmande
- Canton: Les Coteaux de Guyenne
- Intercommunality: Pays de Duras

Government
  - Mayor (2020–2026): Pierre Clament
- Area^{1}: 21.07 km^{2} (8.14 sq mi)
- Elevation: 120 m (390 ft)
- Highest elevation: 127 m (417 ft)
- Lowest elevation: 42 m (138 ft)
- Population (2023): 454
  - Density: 21.5/km^{2} (55.8/sq mi)
- Time zone: UTC+01:00 (CET)
  - Summer (DST): UTC+02:00 (CEST)
- INSEE/Postal code: 47278 /47120
- ^{1} French Land Register data, which excludes lakes, ponds, glaciers > 1 km^{2} (0.386 sq mi or 247 acres) and river estuaries.

Saint-Sernin (French pronunciation: [sɛ̃ sɛʁnɛ̃]; Occitan: Sent Sarnin de Duràs) is a commune in the Lot-et-Garonne department in south-western France.

== See also ==
- Communes of the Lot-et-Garonne department
