= Saint-Barthélemy-d'Agenais =

- Commune
- Coat of arms
- Location of Saint-Barthélemy-d'Agenais
- Location within France Location within Nouvelle-Aquitaine
- Coordinates: 44°31′23″N 0°22′30″E
- Country: France
- Region: Nouvelle-Aquitaine
- Department: Lot-et-Garonne
- Arrondissement: Marmande
- Canton: Les Coteaux de Guyenne
- Intercommunality: Val de Garonne Agglomération

Government
  - Mayor (2020–2026): Gaëtan Malange
- Area^{1}: 15.28 km^{2} (5.90 sq mi)
- Elevation: 95 m (312 ft)
- Highest elevation: 131 m (430 ft)
- Lowest elevation: 52 m (171 ft)
- Population (2023): 549
  - Density: 35.9/km^{2} (93.1/sq mi)
- Time zone: UTC+01:00 (CET)
  - Summer (DST): UTC+02:00 (CEST)
- INSEE/Postal code: 47232 /47350
- ^{1} French Land Register data, which excludes lakes, ponds, glaciers > 1 km^{2} (0.386 sq mi or 247 acres) and river estuaries.

Saint-Barthélemy-d'Agenais (French pronunciation: [sɛ̃ baʁtelemi daʒ(ə)nɛ], literally Saint-Barthélemy of Agenais; Occitan: Sent Bertomiu d'Agenés) is a commune in the Lot-et-Garonne department in south-western France.

== See also ==
- Communes of the Lot-et-Garonne department
