= Moustier, Lot-et-Garonne =

Moustier
- Commune
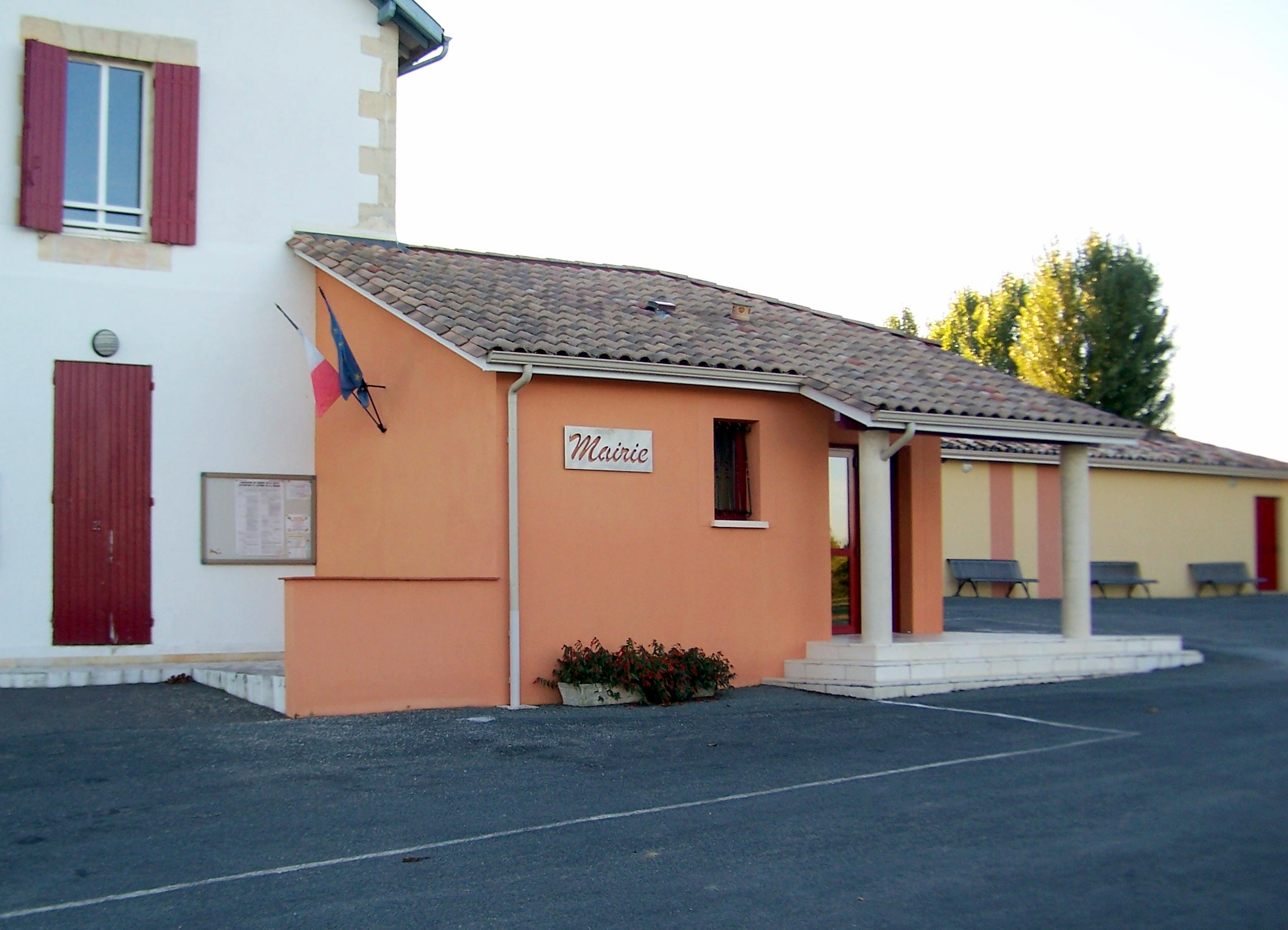
- Town hall
- Location of Moustier
- Location within France Location within Nouvelle-Aquitaine
- Coordinates: 44°38′12″N 0°18′00″E
- Country: France
- Region: Nouvelle-Aquitaine
- Department: Lot-et-Garonne
- Arrondissement: Marmande
- Canton: Les Coteaux de Guyenne
- Intercommunality: CC Pays de Lauzun

Government
  - Mayor (2020–2026): Claudine Eon
- Area^{1}: 8.33 km^{2} (3.22 sq mi)
- Elevation: 42 m (138 ft)
- Highest elevation: 113 m (371 ft)
- Lowest elevation: 35 m (115 ft)
- Population (2023): 324
  - Density: 38.9/km^{2} (101/sq mi)
- Time zone: UTC+01:00 (CET)
  - Summer (DST): UTC+02:00 (CEST)
- INSEE/Postal code: 47194 /47800
- ^{1} French Land Register data, which excludes lakes, ponds, glaciers > 1 km^{2} (0.386 sq mi or 247 acres) and river estuaries.

Moustier (French pronunciation: [mustje]; Occitan: Mostièr) is a commune in the Lot-et-Garonne department in south-western France.

== See also ==
- Communes of the Lot-et-Garonne department
