= Saint-Martin-Petit =

- Commune
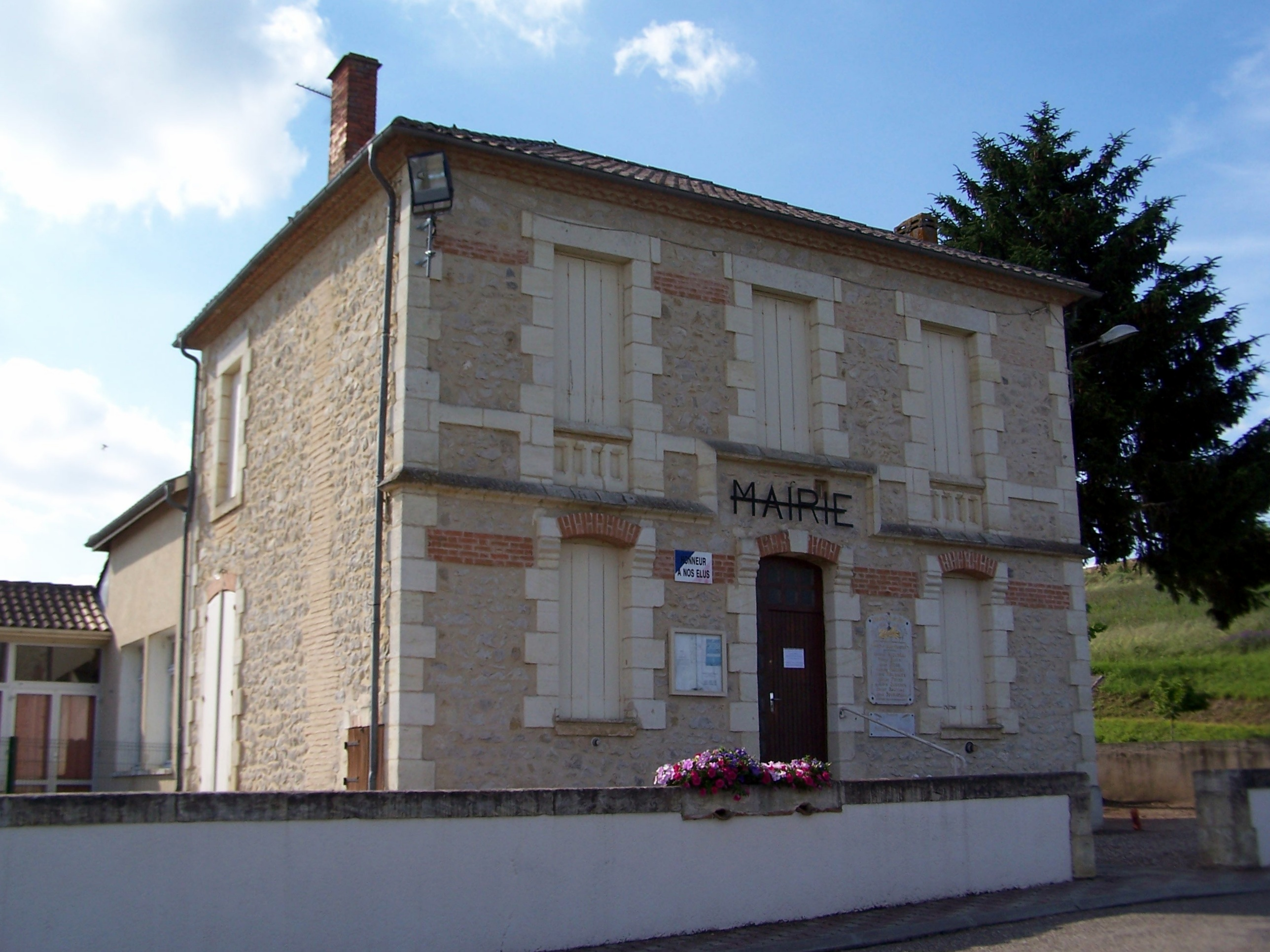
- The town hall in Saint-Martin-Petit
- Location of Saint-Martin-Petit
- Location within France Location within Nouvelle-Aquitaine
- Coordinates: 44°33′46″N 0°05′08″E
- Country: France
- Region: Nouvelle-Aquitaine
- Department: Lot-et-Garonne
- Arrondissement: Marmande
- Canton: Les Coteaux de Guyenne
- Intercommunality: Val de Garonne Agglomération

Government
  - Mayor (2020–2026): Marie-France Bonneau
- Area^{1}: 6.39 km^{2} (2.47 sq mi)
- Elevation: 102 m (335 ft)
- Highest elevation: 114 m (374 ft)
- Lowest elevation: 15 m (49 ft)
- Population (2023): 620
  - Density: 97/km^{2} (250/sq mi)
- Time zone: UTC+01:00 (CET)
  - Summer (DST): UTC+02:00 (CEST)
- INSEE/Postal code: 47257 /47180
- ^{1} French Land Register data, which excludes lakes, ponds, glaciers > 1 km^{2} (0.386 sq mi or 247 acres) and river estuaries.

Saint-Martin-Petit (French pronunciation: [sɛ̃ maʁtɛ̃ pəti]; Occitan: Sent Martin Petit) is a commune in the Lot-et-Garonne department in south-western France.

== See also ==
- Communes of the Lot-et-Garonne department
