= Esclottes =

- Commune
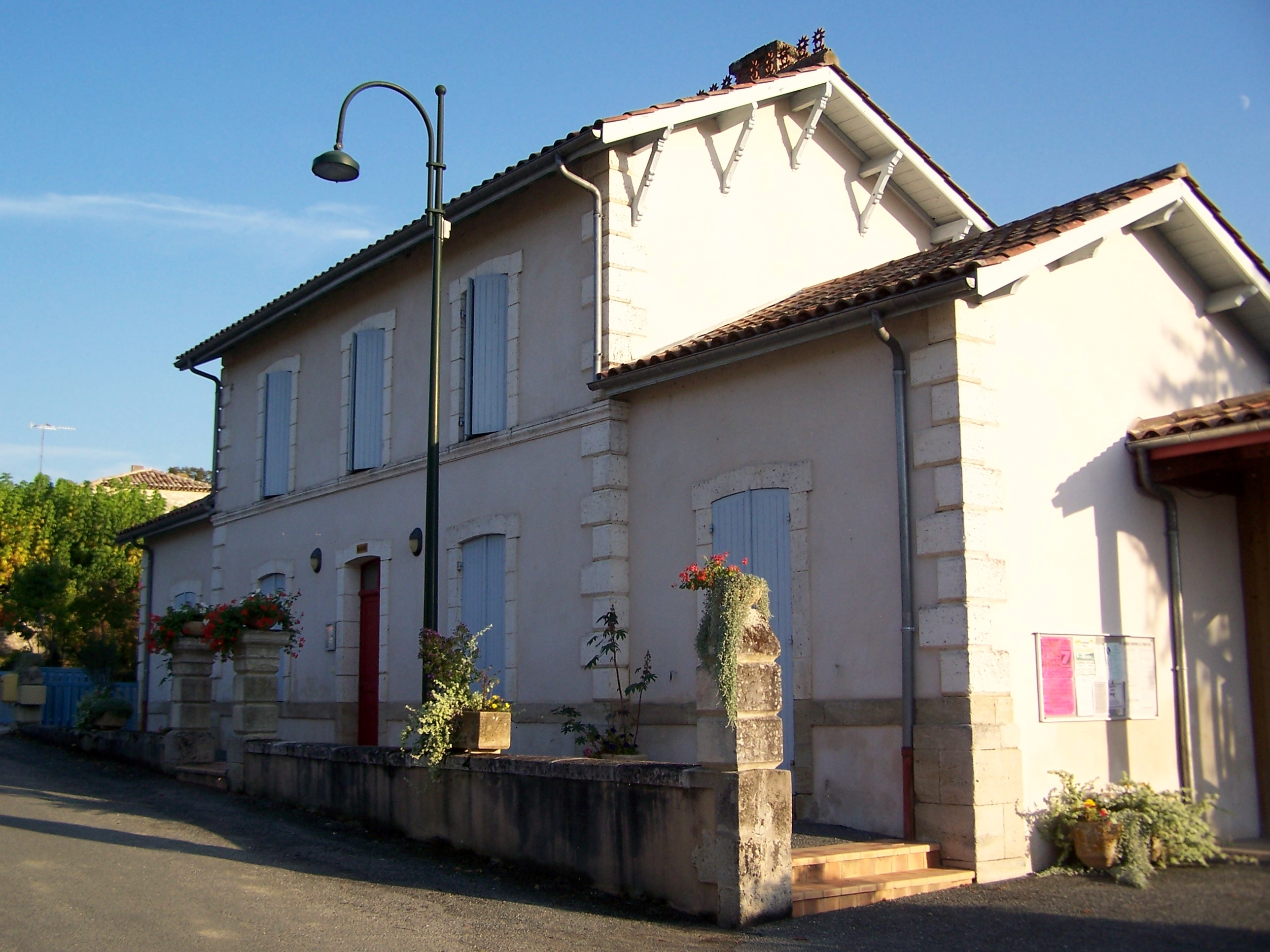
- The town hall in Esclottes
- Location of Esclottes
- Location within France Location within Nouvelle-Aquitaine
- Coordinates: 44°42′33″N 0°08′47″E
- Country: France
- Region: Nouvelle-Aquitaine
- Department: Lot-et-Garonne
- Arrondissement: Marmande
- Canton: Les Coteaux de Guyenne
- Intercommunality: CC Pays de Duras

Government
  - Mayor (2020–2026): Érick Seillier
- Area^{1}: 9.24 km^{2} (3.57 sq mi)
- Elevation: 110 m (360 ft)
- Highest elevation: 117 m (384 ft)
- Lowest elevation: 38 m (125 ft)
- Population (2023): 170
  - Density: 18/km^{2} (48/sq mi)
- Time zone: UTC+01:00 (CET)
  - Summer (DST): UTC+02:00 (CEST)
- INSEE/Postal code: 47089 /47120
- ^{1} French Land Register data, which excludes lakes, ponds, glaciers > 1 km^{2} (0.386 sq mi or 247 acres) and river estuaries.

Esclottes (French pronunciation: [ɛsklɔt]; Occitan: Esclòtas) is a commune in the Lot-et-Garonne department in south-western France.

== See also ==
- Communes of the Lot-et-Garonne department
