= Saint-Avit, Lot-et-Garonne =

Saint-Avit
- Commune
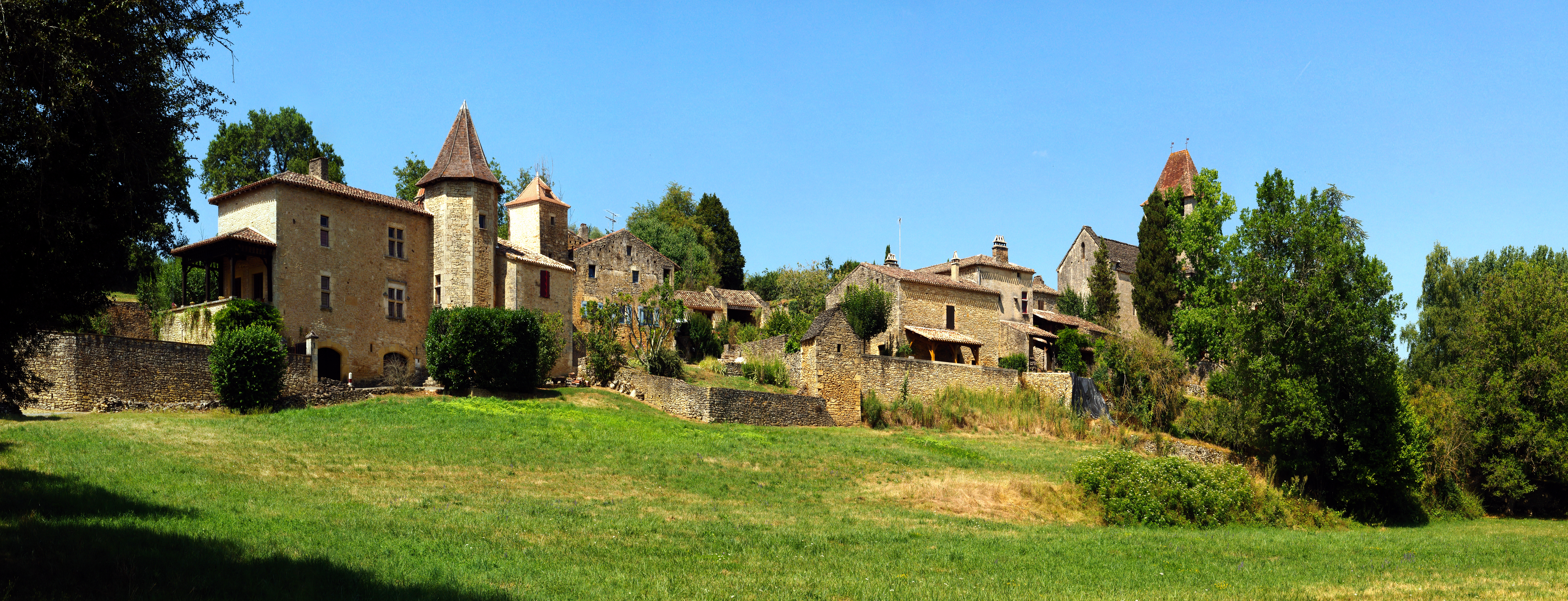
- A general view of Saint-Avit
- Location of Saint-Avit
- Location within France Location within Nouvelle-Aquitaine
- Coordinates: 44°34′08″N 0°12′48″E
- Country: France
- Region: Nouvelle-Aquitaine
- Department: Lot-et-Garonne
- Arrondissement: Marmande
- Canton: Les Coteaux de Guyenne
- Intercommunality: Val de Garonne Agglomération

Government
  - Mayor (2024–2026): Nicolas Lebedinsky
- Area^{1}: 8.95 km^{2} (3.46 sq mi)
- Elevation: 103 m (338 ft)
- Highest elevation: 123 m (404 ft)
- Lowest elevation: 45 m (148 ft)
- Population (2023): 185
  - Density: 20.7/km^{2} (53.5/sq mi)
- Time zone: UTC+01:00 (CET)
  - Summer (DST): UTC+02:00 (CEST)
- INSEE/Postal code: 47231 /47350
- ^{1} French Land Register data, which excludes lakes, ponds, glaciers > 1 km^{2} (0.386 sq mi or 247 acres) and river estuaries.

Saint-Avit is a commune in the Lot-et-Garonne department in south-western France.

== See also ==
- Communes of the Lot-et-Garonne department
