= Monteton =

- Commune
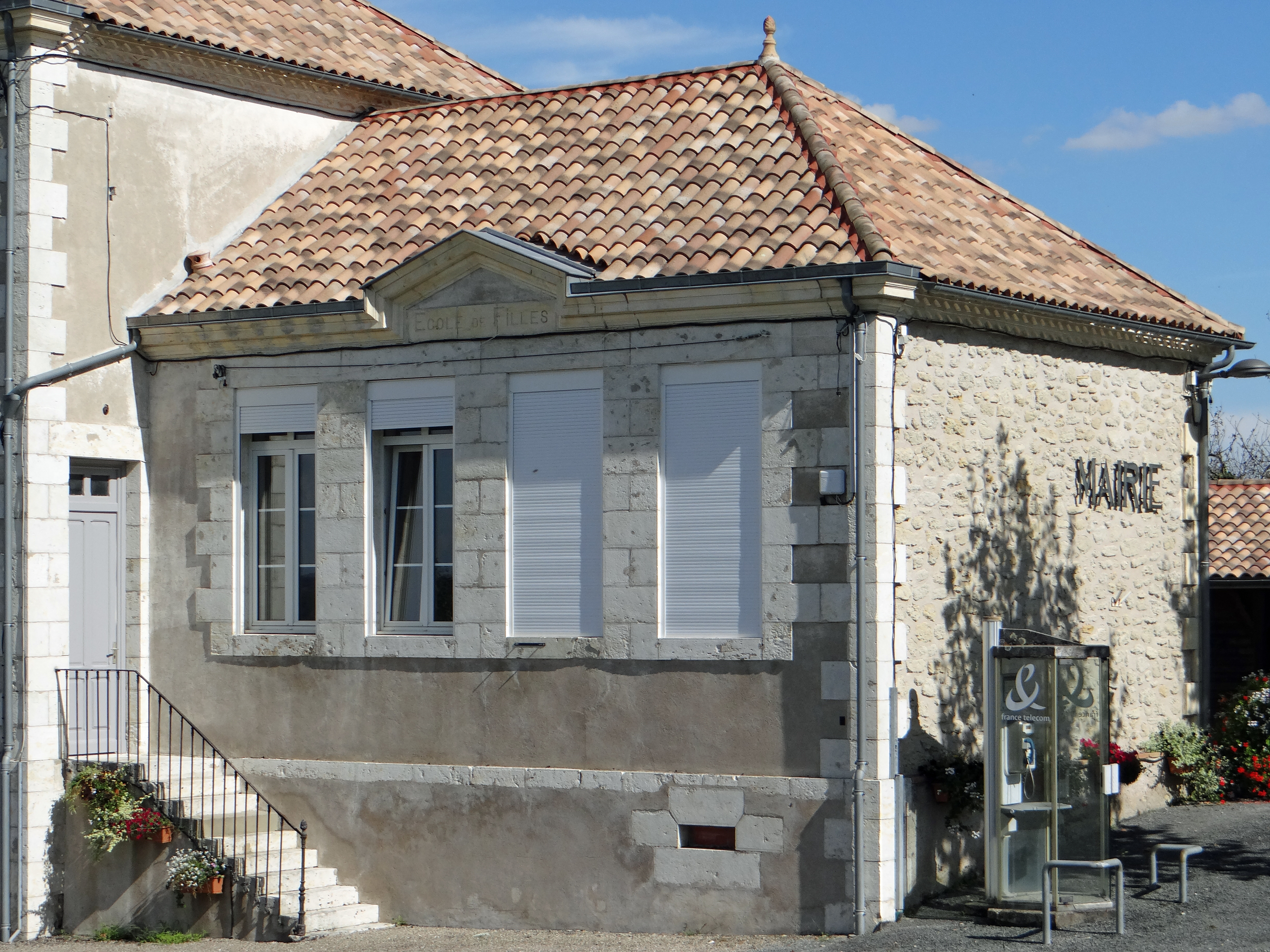
- The town hall in Monteton

- Coat of arms
- Location of Monteton
- Location within France Location within Nouvelle-Aquitaine
- Coordinates: 44°37′27″N 0°15′26″E
- Country: France
- Region: Nouvelle-Aquitaine
- Department: Lot-et-Garonne
- Arrondissement: Marmande
- Canton: Les Coteaux de Guyenne
- Intercommunality: CC Pays de Duras

Government
  - Mayor (2020–2026): Geneviève Le Lannic
- Area^{1}: 13.81 km^{2} (5.33 sq mi)
- Elevation: 101 m (331 ft)
- Highest elevation: 128 m (420 ft)
- Lowest elevation: 33 m (108 ft)
- Population (2023): 323
  - Density: 23.4/km^{2} (60.6/sq mi)
- Time zone: UTC+01:00 (CET)
  - Summer (DST): UTC+02:00 (CEST)
- INSEE/Postal code: 47187 /47120
- ^{1} French Land Register data, which excludes lakes, ponds, glaciers > 1 km^{2} (0.386 sq mi or 247 acres) and river estuaries.

Monteton (French pronunciation: [mɔ̃tətɔ̃]) is a commune in the Lot-et-Garonne department in south-western France.

== See also ==
- Communes of the Lot-et-Garonne department
