= Saint-Géraud =

- Commune
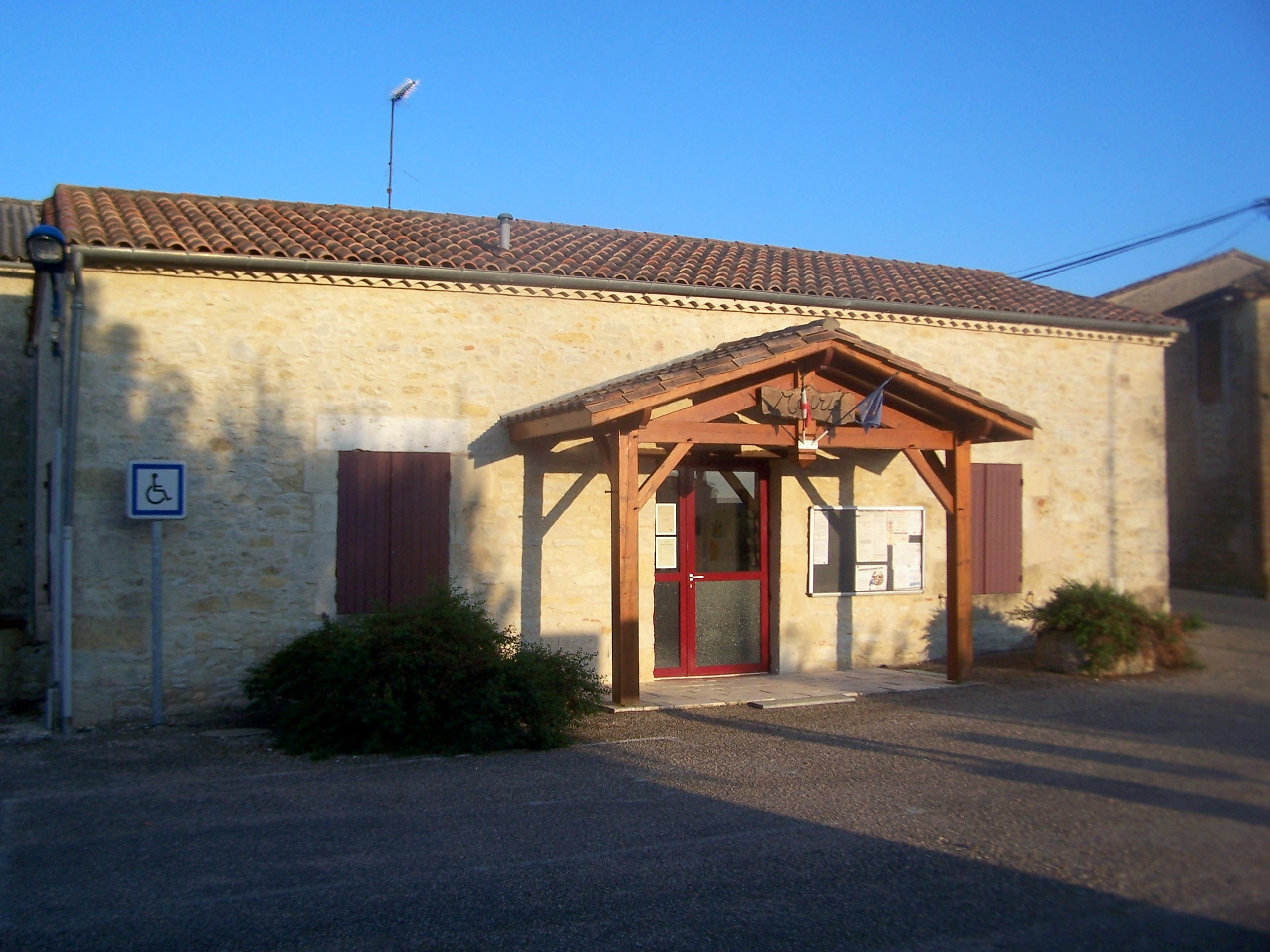
- Saint-Géraud Town hall
- Location of Saint-Géraud
- Location within France Location within Nouvelle-Aquitaine
- Coordinates: 44°37′21″N 0°09′14″E
- Country: France
- Region: Nouvelle-Aquitaine
- Department: Lot-et-Garonne
- Arrondissement: Marmande
- Canton: Les Coteaux de Guyenne
- Intercommunality: Pays de Duras

Government
  - Mayor (2020–2026): Denis Morvan
- Area^{1}: 5.68 km^{2} (2.19 sq mi)
- Elevation: 150 m (490 ft)
- Highest elevation: 132 m (433 ft)
- Lowest elevation: 47 m (154 ft)
- Population (2023): 85
  - Density: 15/km^{2} (39/sq mi)
- Time zone: UTC+01:00 (CET)
  - Summer (DST): UTC+02:00 (CEST)
- INSEE/Postal code: 47245 /47120
- ^{1} French Land Register data, which excludes lakes, ponds, glaciers > 1 km^{2} (0.386 sq mi or 247 acres) and river estuaries.

Saint-Géraud (French pronunciation: [sɛ̃ ʒeʁo]; Occitan: Sent Guiraud) is a commune in the Lot-et-Garonne department in south-western France.

== See also ==
- Communes of the Lot-et-Garonne department
