= Mauvezin-sur-Gupie =

- Commune
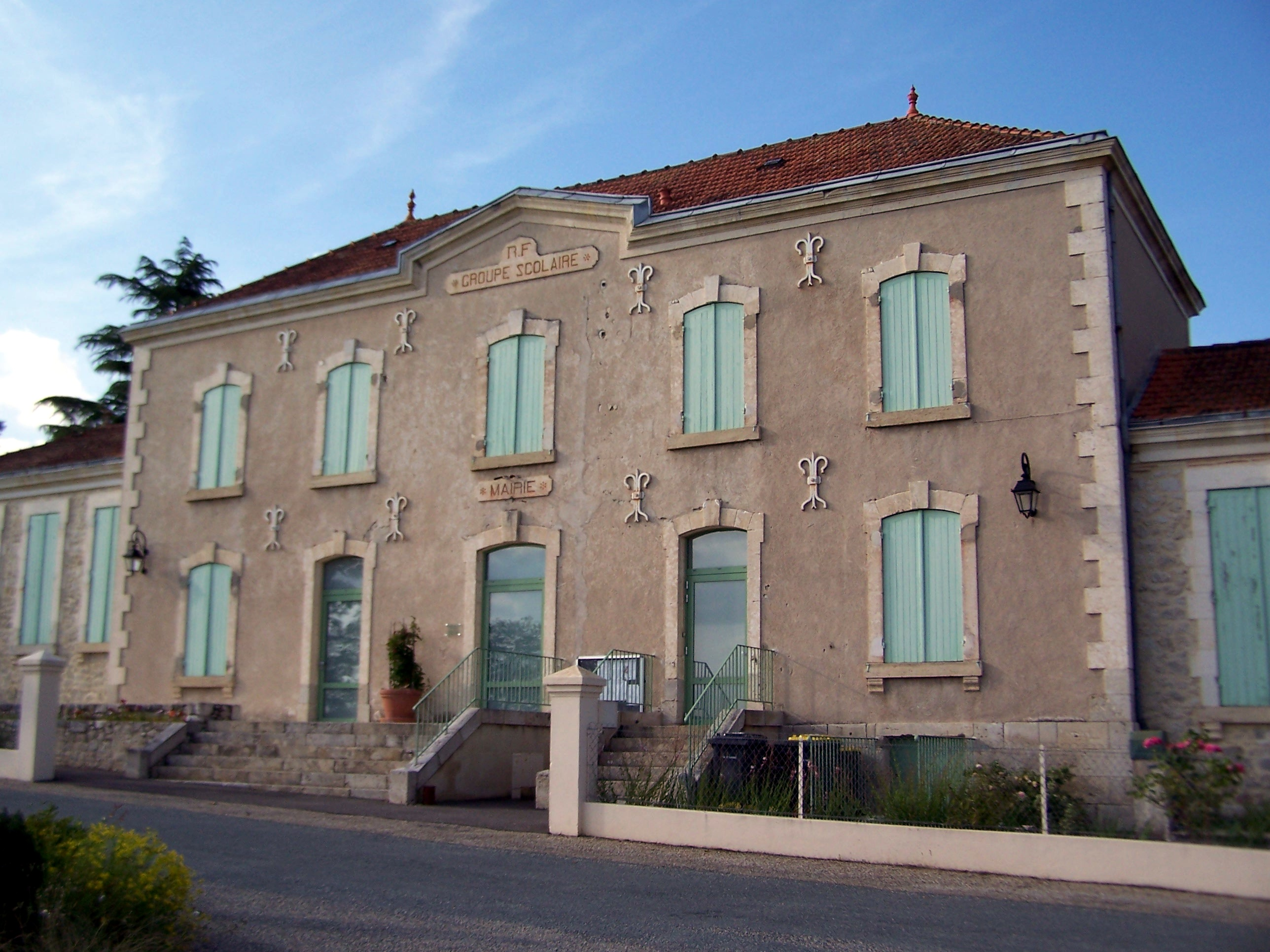
- The town hall in Mauvezin-sur-Gupie

- Coat of arms
- Location of Mauvezin-sur-Gupie
- Location within France Location within Nouvelle-Aquitaine
- Coordinates: 44°33′30″N 0°09′52″E
- Country: France
- Region: Nouvelle-Aquitaine
- Department: Lot-et-Garonne
- Arrondissement: Marmande
- Canton: Les Coteaux de Guyenne
- Intercommunality: Val de Garonne Agglomération

Government
  - Mayor (2020–2026): Daniel Bordeneuve
- Area^{1}: 15.60 km^{2} (6.02 sq mi)
- Population (2023): 613
  - Density: 39.3/km^{2} (102/sq mi)
- Time zone: UTC+01:00 (CET)
  - Summer (DST): UTC+02:00 (CEST)
- INSEE/Postal code: 47163 /47200
- ^{1} French Land Register data, which excludes lakes, ponds, glaciers > 1 km^{2} (0.386 sq mi or 247 acres) and river estuaries.

Mauvezin-sur-Gupie (French pronunciation: [mov(ə)zɛ̃ syʁ ɡypi]; Occitan: Mauvesin) is a commune in the Lot-et-Garonne department in south-western France.

== See also ==
- Communes of the Lot-et-Garonne department
