= Pardaillan, Lot-et-Garonne =

Pardaillan
- Commune
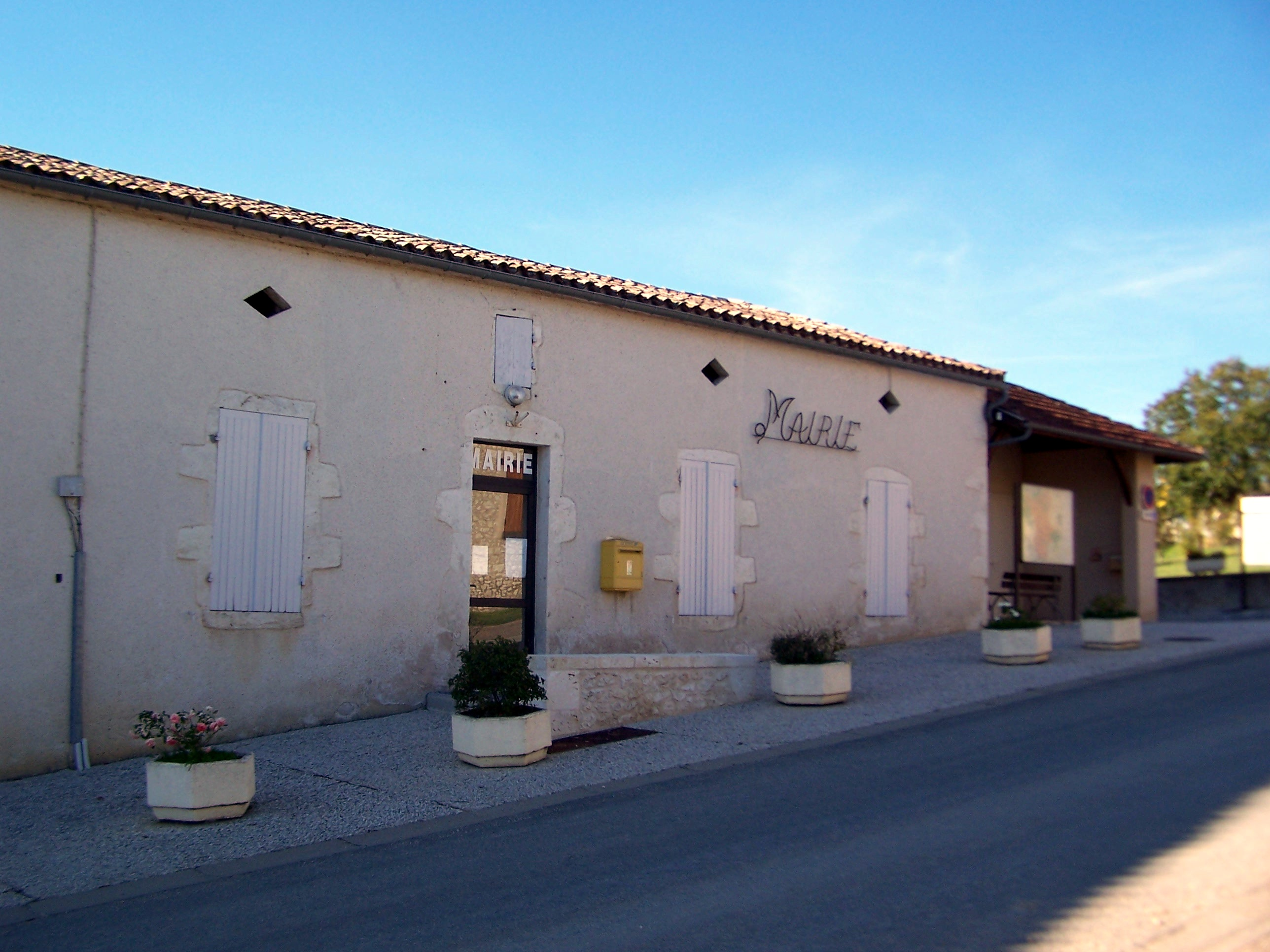
- Town hall
- Location of Pardaillan
- Location within France Location within Nouvelle-Aquitaine
- Coordinates: 44°39′52″N 0°16′53″E
- Country: France
- Region: Nouvelle-Aquitaine
- Department: Lot-et-Garonne
- Arrondissement: Marmande
- Canton: Les Coteaux de Guyenne
- Intercommunality: CC Pays de Duras

Government
  - Mayor (2020–2026): Serge Cadiot
- Area^{1}: 19.71 km^{2} (7.61 sq mi)
- Elevation: 40 m (130 ft)
- Highest elevation: 134 m (440 ft)
- Lowest elevation: 34 m (112 ft)
- Population (2023): 334
  - Density: 16.9/km^{2} (43.9/sq mi)
- Time zone: UTC+01:00 (CET)
  - Summer (DST): UTC+02:00 (CEST)
- INSEE/Postal code: 47199 /47120
- ^{1} French Land Register data, which excludes lakes, ponds, glaciers > 1 km^{2} (0.386 sq mi or 247 acres) and river estuaries.

Pardaillan (French pronunciation: [paʁdajɑ̃]; Occitan: Pardalhan) is a commune in the Lot-et-Garonne department in south-western France.

== See also ==
- Communes of the Lot-et-Garonne department
