= Seyches =

- Commune
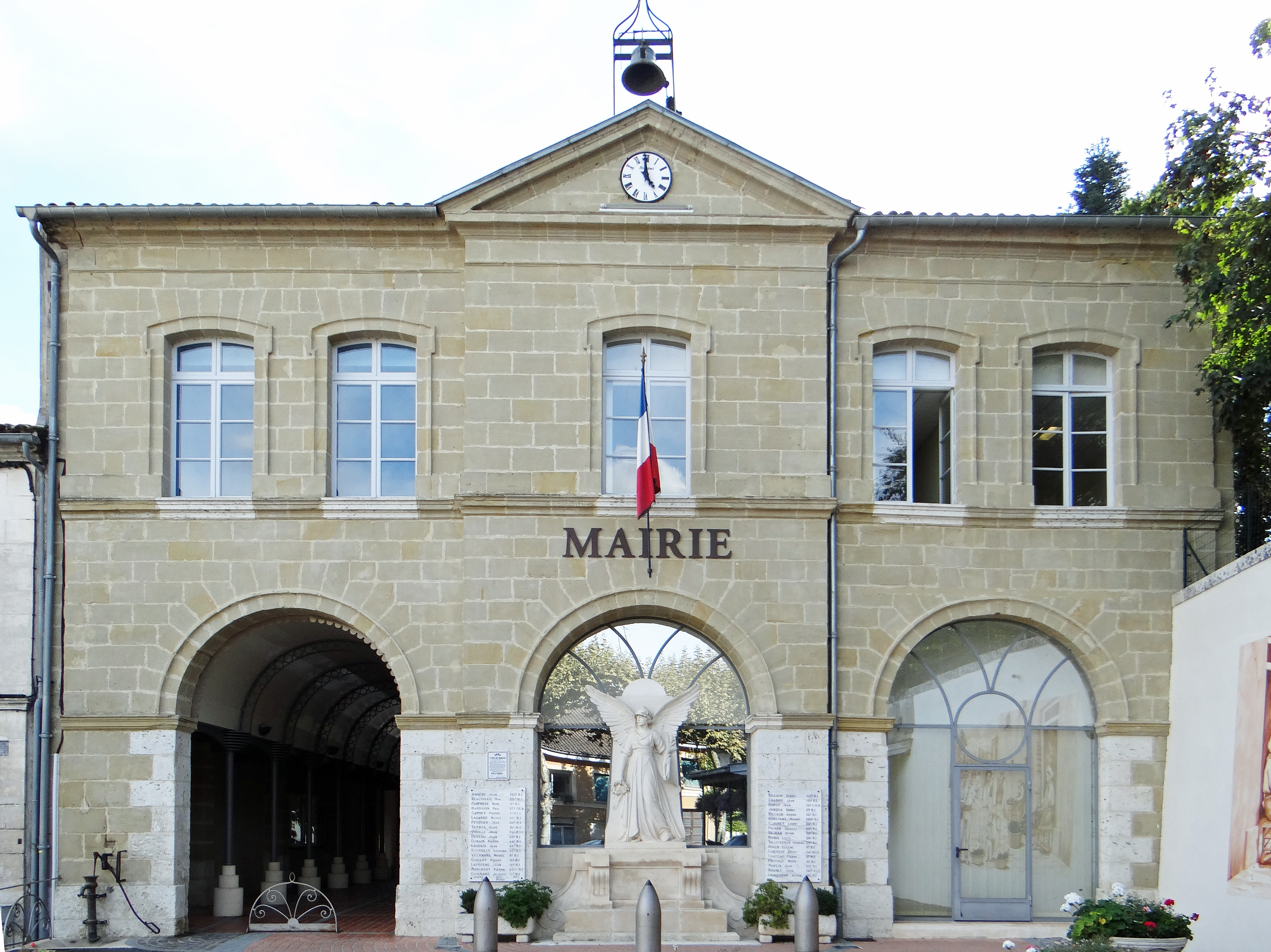
- The town hall in Seyches
- Location of Seyches
- Location within France Location within Nouvelle-Aquitaine
- Coordinates: 44°33′02″N 0°18′21″E
- Country: France
- Region: Nouvelle-Aquitaine
- Department: Lot-et-Garonne
- Arrondissement: Marmande
- Canton: Les Coteaux de Guyenne
- Intercommunality: Val de Garonne Agglomération

Government
  - Mayor (2021–2026): Emmanuel Vigo
- Area^{1}: 24.69 km^{2} (9.53 sq mi)
- Elevation: 57 m (187 ft)
- Highest elevation: 133 m (436 ft)
- Lowest elevation: 46 m (151 ft)
- Population (2023): 1,063
  - Density: 43.05/km^{2} (111.5/sq mi)
- Time zone: UTC+01:00 (CET)
  - Summer (DST): UTC+02:00 (CEST)
- INSEE/Postal code: 47301 /47350
- ^{1} French Land Register data, which excludes lakes, ponds, glaciers > 1 km^{2} (0.386 sq mi or 247 acres) and river estuaries.

Seyches (French pronunciation: [sɛʃ]; Occitan: Sèishas) is a commune in the Lot-et-Garonne department in south-western France.

== See also ==
- Communes of the Lot-et-Garonne department
