= Saint-Astier, Lot-et-Garonne =

Saint-Astier
- Commune
- Location of Saint-Astier
- Location within France Location within Nouvelle-Aquitaine
- Coordinates: 44°43′48″N 0°15′20″E
- Country: France
- Region: Nouvelle-Aquitaine
- Department: Lot-et-Garonne
- Arrondissement: Marmande
- Canton: Les Coteaux de Guyenne
- Intercommunality: Pays de Duras

Government
  - Mayor (2020–2026): Céline Derouin
- Area^{1}: 9.56 km^{2} (3.69 sq mi)
- Elevation: 110 m (360 ft)
- Highest elevation: 165 m (541 ft)
- Lowest elevation: 57 m (187 ft)
- Population (2023): 203
  - Density: 21.2/km^{2} (55.0/sq mi)
- Time zone: UTC+01:00 (CET)
  - Summer (DST): UTC+02:00 (CEST)
- INSEE/Postal code: 47229 /47120
- ^{1} French Land Register data, which excludes lakes, ponds, glaciers > 1 km^{2} (0.386 sq mi or 247 acres) and river estuaries.

Saint-Astier (French pronunciation: [sɛ̃.t‿astje]; Occitan: Sent Astier) is a commune in the Lot-et-Garonne department in south-western France.

== See also ==
- Communes of the Lot-et-Garonne department
