= Duras, Lot-et-Garonne =

Duras
- Commune
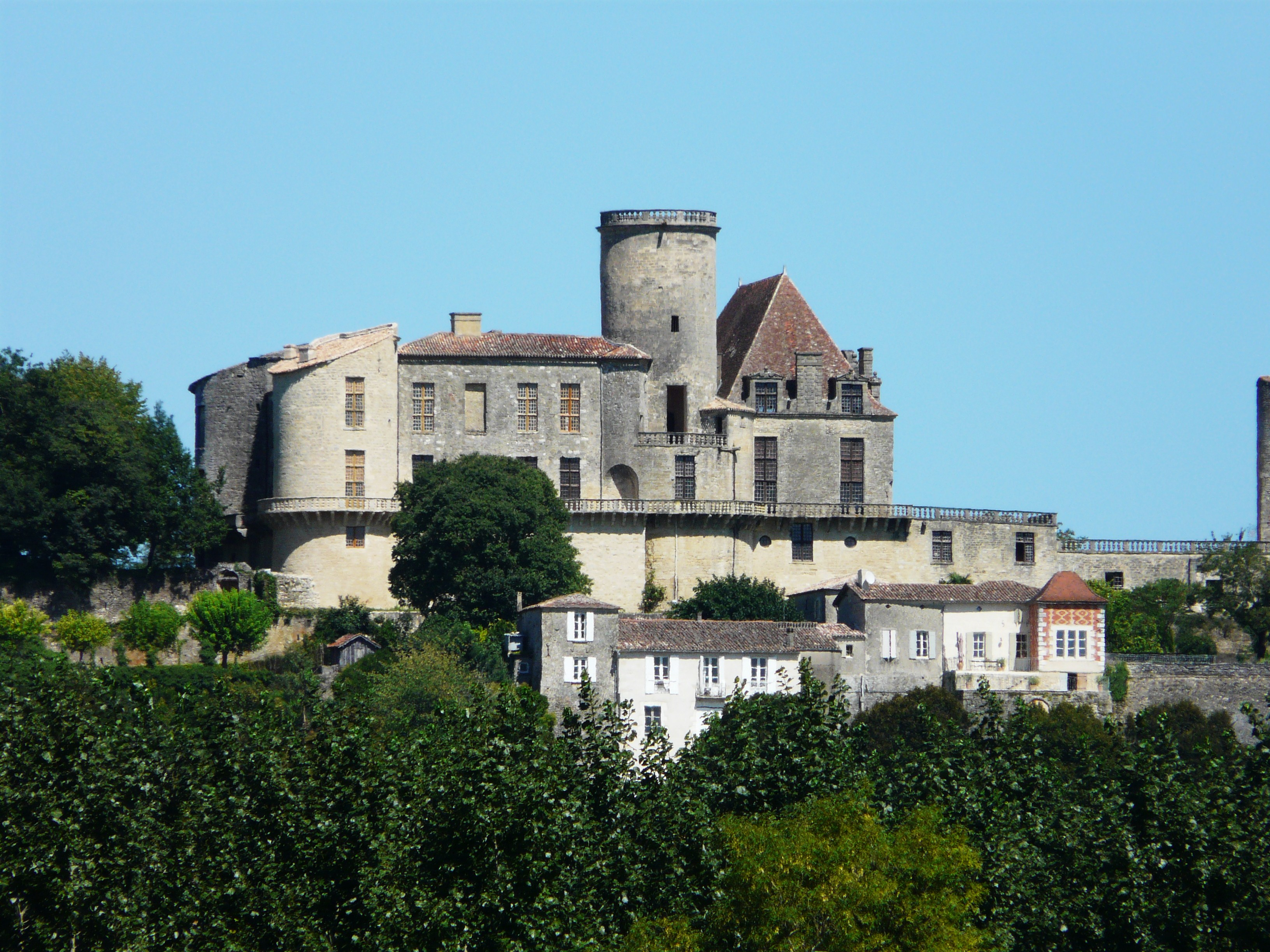
- The château in Duras

- Coat of arms
- Location of Duras
- Location within France Location within Nouvelle-Aquitaine
- Coordinates: 44°40′37″N 0°11′01″E
- Country: France
- Region: Nouvelle-Aquitaine
- Department: Lot-et-Garonne
- Arrondissement: Marmande
- Canton: Les Coteaux de Guyenne

Government
  - Mayor (2020–2026): Bernadette Dreux
- Area^{1}: 20.17 km^{2} (7.79 sq mi)
- Elevation: 100 m (330 ft)
- Highest elevation: 128 m (420 ft)
- Lowest elevation: 28 m (92 ft)
- Population (2023): 1,208
  - Density: 59.89/km^{2} (155.1/sq mi)
- Time zone: UTC+01:00 (CET)
  - Summer (DST): UTC+02:00 (CEST)
- INSEE/Postal code: 47086 /47120
- ^{1} French Land Register data, which excludes lakes, ponds, glaciers > 1 km^{2} (0.386 sq mi or 247 acres) and river estuaries.

Duras (French pronunciation: [dyʁas]; Occitan: Duràs) is a commune in the department of Lot-et-Garonne in south-western France.

The town is traversed by the Dropt river.

== Notable people ==
- David Hume of Godscroft (1558-1629), Scottish historian and philosopher, was the pastor in Duras 1604–1614.
- The writer Marguerite Donnadieu (1914–1996) took the pseudonym "Marguerite Duras" in 1943, after this village, where her father's house was located.

== Sister cities ==
Duras is twinned with the following cities:

- Sint-Truiden, Belgium

== See also ==
- Communes of the Lot-et-Garonne department
