= Dropt =

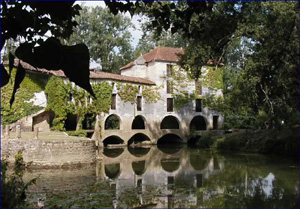
- Moulin de Loubens sur le Dropt

- Location within France Location within Nouvelle-Aquitaine

Physical characteristics
- Source
  - location: Massif Central
  - coordinates: 44°41′9″N 0°57′24″E
  - elevation: 239 m (784 ft)
- Mouth
  - location: Garonne
  - coordinates: 44°34′58″N 0°6′35″W
- Length: 132 km (82 mi)
- Basin size: 1,500 km^{2} (580 sq mi)
- Discharge
  - average: 4.5 m^{3}/s (160 cu ft/s)

Basin features
- Progression: Garonne→ Gironde estuary→ Atlantic Ocean

The Drot or Dropt (French pronunciation: [dʁo]) is a river in Nouvelle-Aquitaine, France. It is a right tributary to the Garonne. It is 132 km (82 mi) long.

== Geography ==
The source of the Dropt is located near Capdrot in the Dordogne. The drainage basin covers the area between the river valleys of the Lot and the Dordogne.
