= Louis Lavelle =

French philosopher (1883-1951)

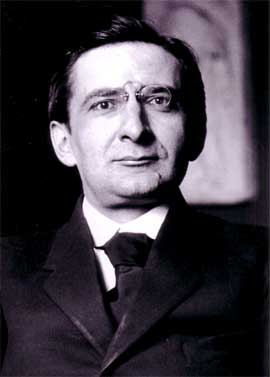
- Louis Lavelle
- Born: July 15, 1883; Saint-Martin-de-Villeréal, France
- Died: September 1, 1951 (aged 68); Parranquet, France

Philosophical work
- Era: 20th-century philosophy
- Region: Western philosophy
- School: Continental philosophy French spiritualism
- Main interests: Metaphysics, ethics
- Notable ideas: Classification of values, participation in the Absolute (participation à l'Absolu)

Louis Lavelle (/lɑːˈvɛl/; French: [lavɛl]; July 15, 1883 – September 1, 1951) was a French philosopher, considered one of the greatest French metaphysicians of the twentieth century. His magnum opus, La Dialectique de l'éternel présent (1922), is a systematic metaphysical work. Lavelle's other principal works include De l'Être (1928), De l'Acte (1937), Du Temps et de l'Eternité (1945), and De l'Âme Humaine (1951).

In his works, Lavelle dealt with themes such as axiology, aesthetics, the problem of evil, morality, and freedom of the spirit. Lavelle was a member of the Académie des Sciences Morales et Politiques.

== Biography ==
Louis Lavelle was born in France in 1883 and died there in 1951. He was Professor at the College de France, at the Sorbonne, and lectured at German, Italian, Swiss, Belgian and Dutch universities. In 1947 he was recognized for his many philosophical and religious writings, and named to the Académie des sciences morales et politiques.

=== Reception ===
Lavelle's work aroused much interest in the interwar period, yet received less attention in the second half of the twentieth century, although he was recognized by some of the greatest French philosophers of the 20th century, such as Merleau-Ponty, Gilles Deleuze, Paul Ricœur and Pierre Hadot, In addition to the coverage he received in France, articles dedicated to him have come from Italian and Brazilian interpreters.

From 1989 to 2019, thank to efforts by names like Alexis Klimov, Jean École, Jean-Louis Vieillard-Baron, Michel Adam and Bruno Pinchard, the Louis Lavelle Association promoted annual conferences on the work of the author. While some 21st century commentators consider Lavelle a forgotten philosopher, ongoing scholarship on his work continues into 2021.

== Major publications ==
Original French

Lavelle's other writings include La dialectique du monde sensible: La perception visuelle de la profondeur (1921), La conscience de soi (1933), La présence totale (1934), L'Erreur de Narcisse (1939), Le Mal et la Souffrance (1940), La Parole et l'Écriture (1947), and Les puissances du Moi (1948).

Selected translations of works by Lavelle

- A translation of selected chapters of De l’Acte (Of the Act), Du temps et de l’éternité (Of Time and Eternity) and De l’âme humaine (Of the Human Soul), together with a long introduction to the work of Lavelle, can be found in The Act of Presence by Robert Jones. Both are presented in full on the website of the Association Louis Lavelle (http://association-lavelle.chez-alice.fr) under « Traductions ».

== See also ==
- René Le Senne
- Gabriel Marcel
