= Moulinet =

Moulinet may refer to:

- A circular cut, in fencing; see fencing terminology
- Moulinet, Alpes-Maritimes, a French commune in the Alpes-Maritimes department
- Moulinet, Lot-et-Garonne, a French commune in the Lot-et-Garonne department
