= La Sauvetat-sur-Lède =

- Commune
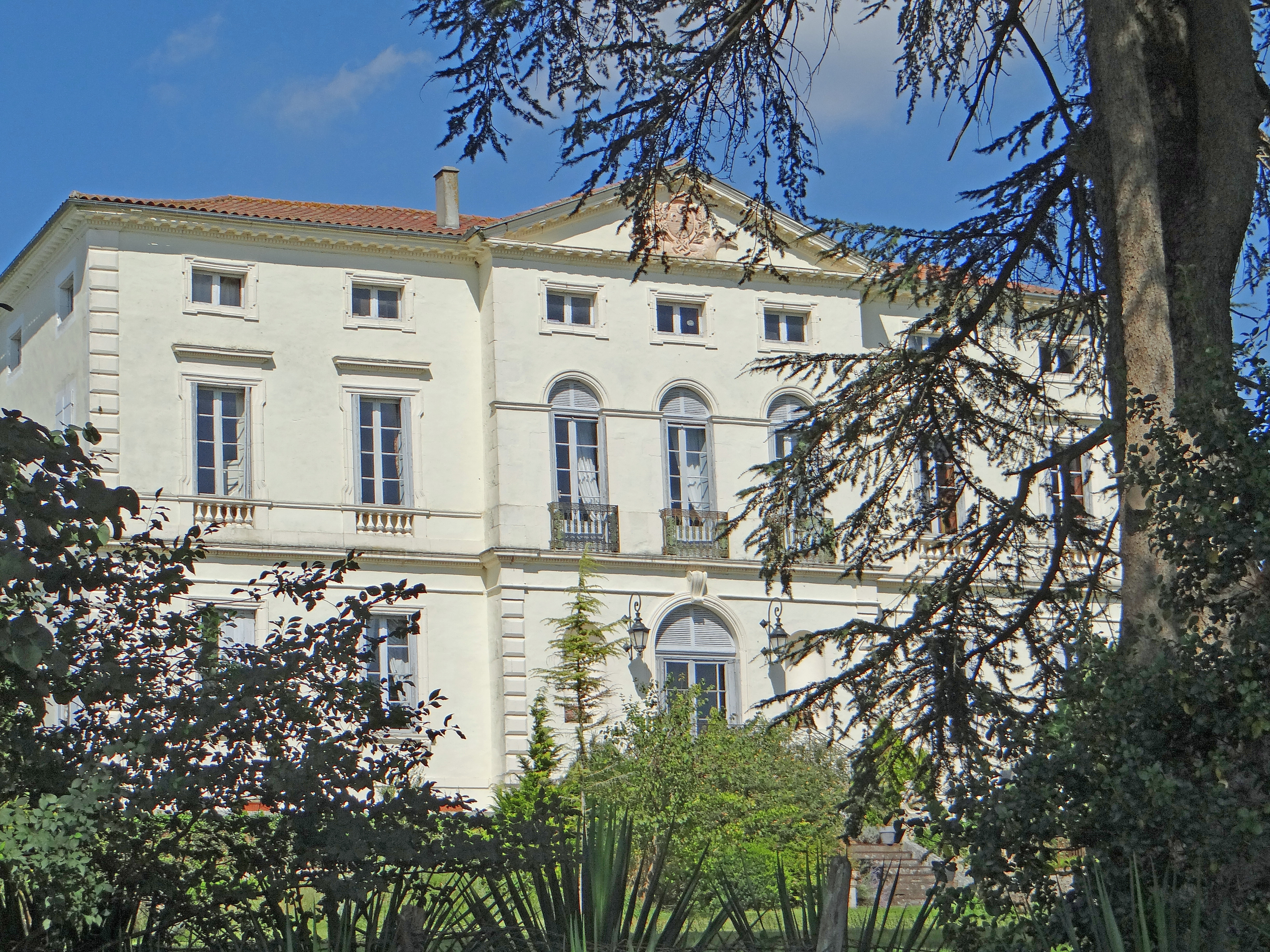
- The Château Saint-Sulpice, in La Sauvetat-sur-Lède
- Location of La Sauvetat-sur-Lède
- Location within France Location within Nouvelle-Aquitaine
- Coordinates: 44°28′12″N 0°43′51″E
- Country: France
- Region: Nouvelle-Aquitaine
- Department: Lot-et-Garonne
- Arrondissement: Villeneuve-sur-Lot
- Canton: Le Haut agenais Périgord
- Intercommunality: Bastides en Haut-Agenais Périgord

Government
  - Mayor (2020–2026): Françoise Laborde
- Area^{1}: 14.14 km^{2} (5.46 sq mi)
- Elevation: 80 m (260 ft)
- Highest elevation: 184 m (604 ft)
- Lowest elevation: 60 m (200 ft)
- Population (2023): 643
  - Density: 45.5/km^{2} (118/sq mi)
- Time zone: UTC+01:00 (CET)
  - Summer (DST): UTC+02:00 (CEST)
- INSEE/Postal code: 47291 /47150
- ^{1} French Land Register data, which excludes lakes, ponds, glaciers > 1 km^{2} (0.386 sq mi or 247 acres) and river estuaries.

La Sauvetat-sur-Lède (French pronunciation: [la sovta syʁ lɛd], literally La Sauvetat on Lède; Occitan: La Salvetat de Leda) is a commune in the Lot-et-Garonne department in south-western France.

== See also ==
- Communes of the Lot-et-Garonne department
