= Saint-Étienne-de-Villeréal =

- Commune
- Location of Saint-Étienne-de-Villeréal
- Location within France Location within Nouvelle-Aquitaine
- Coordinates: 44°36′59″N 0°45′50″E
- Country: France
- Region: Nouvelle-Aquitaine
- Department: Lot-et-Garonne
- Arrondissement: Villeneuve-sur-Lot
- Canton: Le Haut agenais Périgord

Government
  - Mayor (2020–2026): Serge Bataillé
- Area^{1}: 14.62 km^{2} (5.64 sq mi)
- Elevation: 120 m (390 ft)
- Highest elevation: 191 m (627 ft)
- Lowest elevation: 88 m (289 ft)
- Population (2023): 261
  - Density: 17.9/km^{2} (46.2/sq mi)
- Time zone: UTC+01:00 (CET)
  - Summer (DST): UTC+02:00 (CEST)
- INSEE/Postal code: 47240 /47210
- ^{1} French Land Register data, which excludes lakes, ponds, glaciers > 1 km^{2} (0.386 sq mi or 247 acres) and river estuaries.

Saint-Étienne-de-Villeréal (French pronunciation: [sɛ̃.t‿etjɛn də vilʁeal], literally Saint-Étienne of Villeréal; Occitan: Sent Estèfe de Vilarial) is a commune in the Lot-et-Garonne department in south-western France.

== See also ==
- Communes of the Lot-et-Garonne department
