= Montagnac-sur-Lède =

- Commune
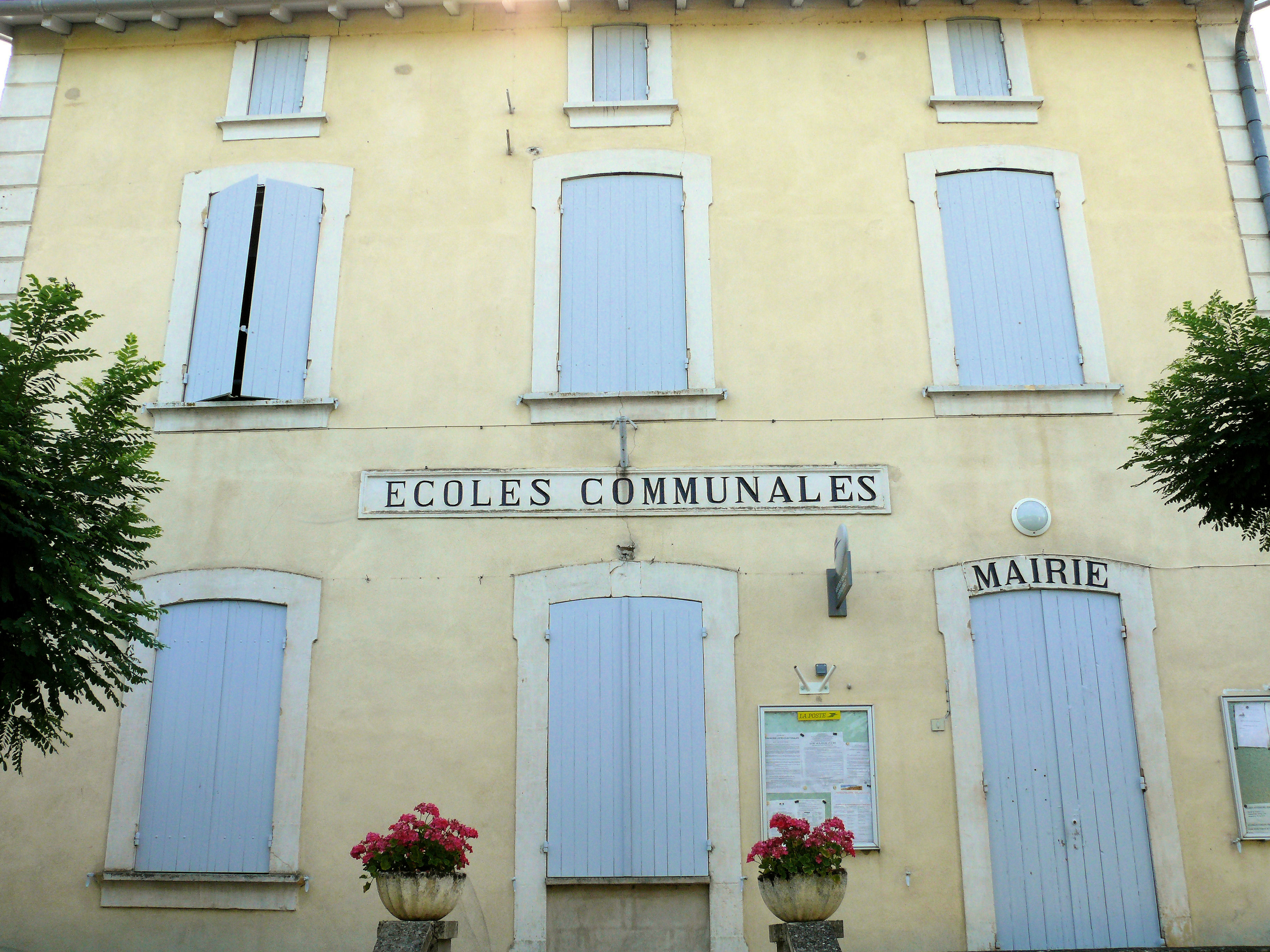
- The town hall in Montagnac-sur-Lède
- Location of Montagnac-sur-Lède
- Location within France Location within Nouvelle-Aquitaine
- Coordinates: 44°32′33″N 0°50′42″E
- Country: France
- Region: Nouvelle-Aquitaine
- Department: Lot-et-Garonne
- Arrondissement: Villeneuve-sur-Lot
- Canton: Le Haut agenais Périgord
- Intercommunality: Bastides en Haut-Agenais Périgord

Government
  - Mayor (2020–2026): Yvon Setze
- Area^{1}: 19.55 km^{2} (7.55 sq mi)
- Elevation: 130 m (430 ft)
- Highest elevation: 231 m (758 ft)
- Lowest elevation: 85 m (279 ft)
- Population (2023): 271
  - Density: 13.9/km^{2} (35.9/sq mi)
- Time zone: UTC+01:00 (CET)
  - Summer (DST): UTC+02:00 (CEST)
- INSEE/Postal code: 47181 /47150
- ^{1} French Land Register data, which excludes lakes, ponds, glaciers > 1 km^{2} (0.386 sq mi or 247 acres) and river estuaries.

Montagnac-sur-Lède (French pronunciation: [mɔ̃taɲak syʁ lɛd], literally Montagnac on Lède; Occitan: Montanhac de Leda) is a commune in the Lot-et-Garonne department in south-western France.

== See also ==
- Communes of the Lot-et-Garonne department
