= Savignac-sur-Leyze =

- Commune
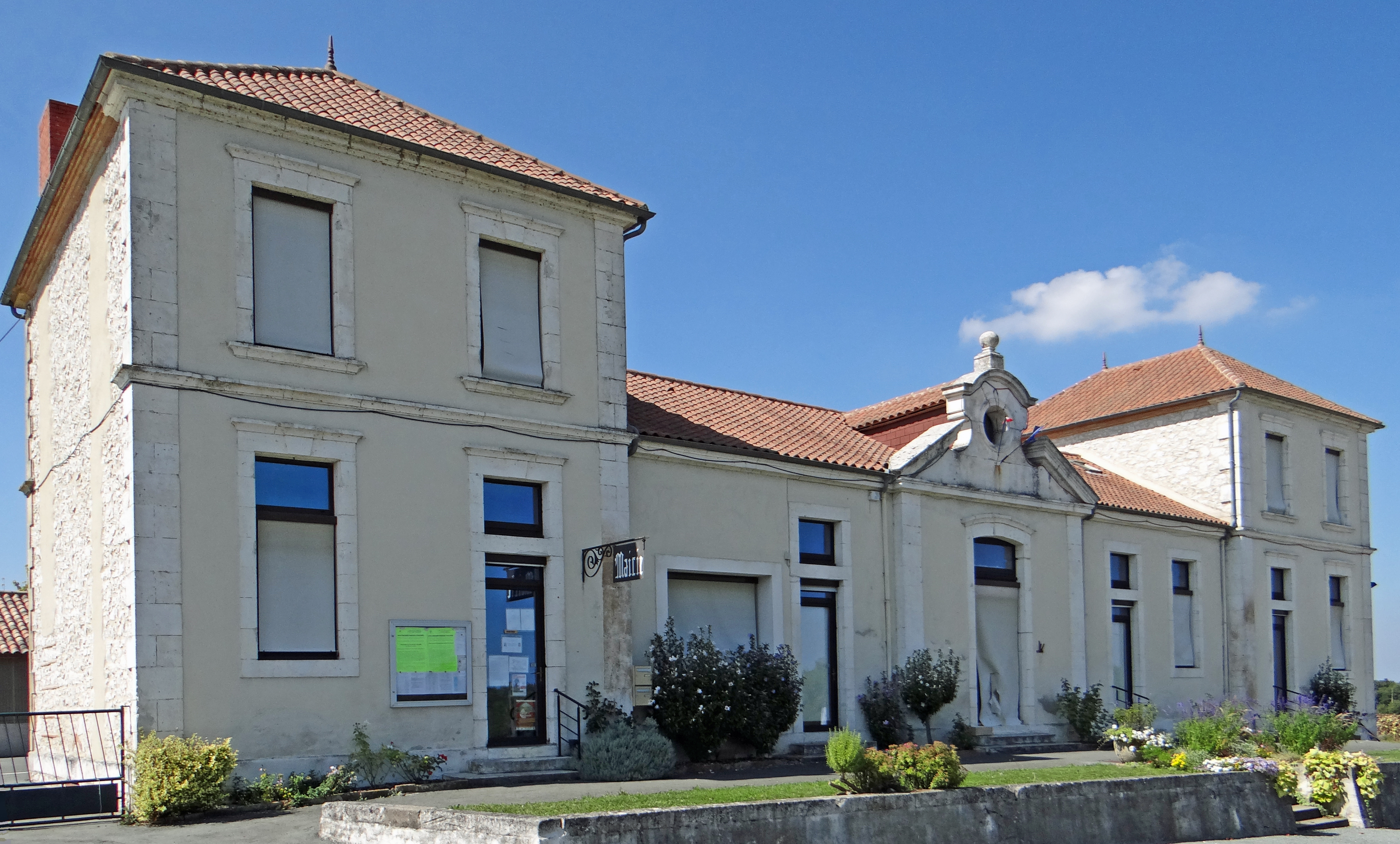
- The town hall and school in Savignac-sur-Leyze
- Location of Savignac-sur-Leyze
- Location within France Location within Nouvelle-Aquitaine
- Coordinates: 44°28′52″N 0°47′29″E
- Country: France
- Region: Nouvelle-Aquitaine
- Department: Lot-et-Garonne
- Arrondissement: Villeneuve-sur-Lot
- Canton: Le Haut agenais Périgord
- Intercommunality: Bastides en Haut-Agenais Périgord

Government
  - Mayor (2020–2026): Christian Faure
- Area^{1}: 11.38 km^{2} (4.39 sq mi)
- Elevation: 200 m (660 ft)
- Highest elevation: 153 m (502 ft)
- Lowest elevation: 70 m (230 ft)
- Population (2023): 321
  - Density: 28.2/km^{2} (73.1/sq mi)
- Time zone: UTC+01:00 (CET)
  - Summer (DST): UTC+02:00 (CEST)
- INSEE/Postal code: 47295 /47150
- ^{1} French Land Register data, which excludes lakes, ponds, glaciers > 1 km^{2} (0.386 sq mi or 247 acres) and river estuaries.

Savignac-sur-Leyze (French pronunciation: [saviɲak syʁ lɛz]; Occitan: Savinhac de Lèisa) is a commune in the Lot-et-Garonne department in south-western France.

== See also ==
- Communes of the Lot-et-Garonne department
