= Monségur, Lot-et-Garonne =

Monségur
- Commune
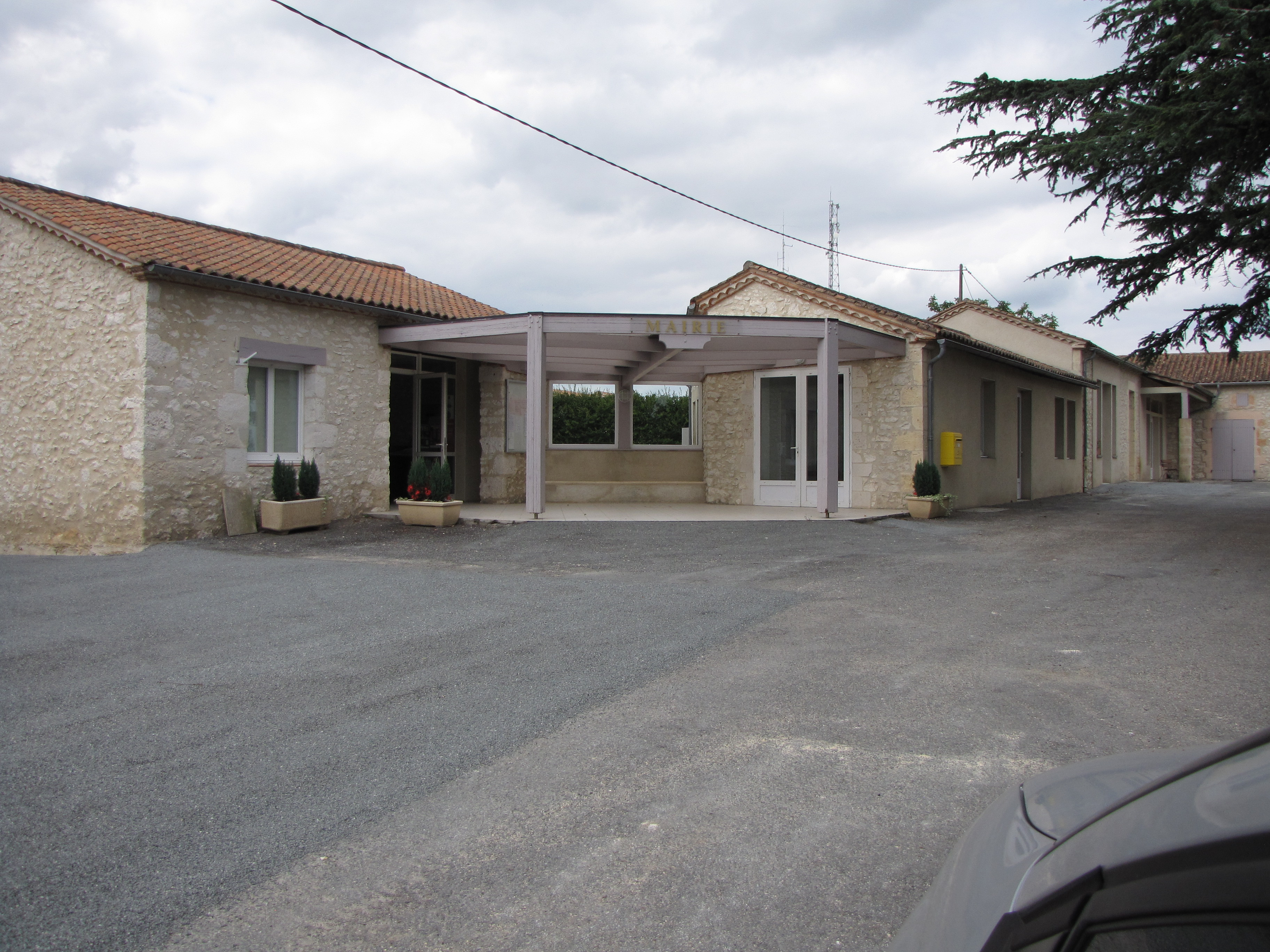
- The town hall in Monségur
- Location of Monségur
- Location within France Location within Nouvelle-Aquitaine
- Coordinates: 44°29′06″N 0°52′48″E
- Country: France
- Region: Nouvelle-Aquitaine
- Department: Lot-et-Garonne
- Arrondissement: Villeneuve-sur-Lot
- Canton: Le Haut agenais Périgord
- Intercommunality: Bastides en Haut-Agenais Périgord

Government
  - Mayor (2020–2026): Jeannine Jourdane
- Area^{1}: 10.99 km^{2} (4.24 sq mi)
- Elevation: 236 m (774 ft)
- Highest elevation: 238 m (781 ft)
- Lowest elevation: 80 m (260 ft)
- Population (2023): 397
  - Density: 36.1/km^{2} (93.6/sq mi)
- Time zone: UTC+01:00 (CET)
  - Summer (DST): UTC+02:00 (CEST)
- INSEE/Postal code: 47178 /47150
- ^{1} French Land Register data, which excludes lakes, ponds, glaciers > 1 km^{2} (0.386 sq mi or 247 acres) and river estuaries.

Monségur (French pronunciation: [mɔ̃seɡyʁ]; Occitan: Montsegur) is a commune in the Lot-et-Garonne department in south-western France.

== See also ==
- Communes of the Lot-et-Garonne department
