= Salles, Lot-et-Garonne =

Salles
- Commune
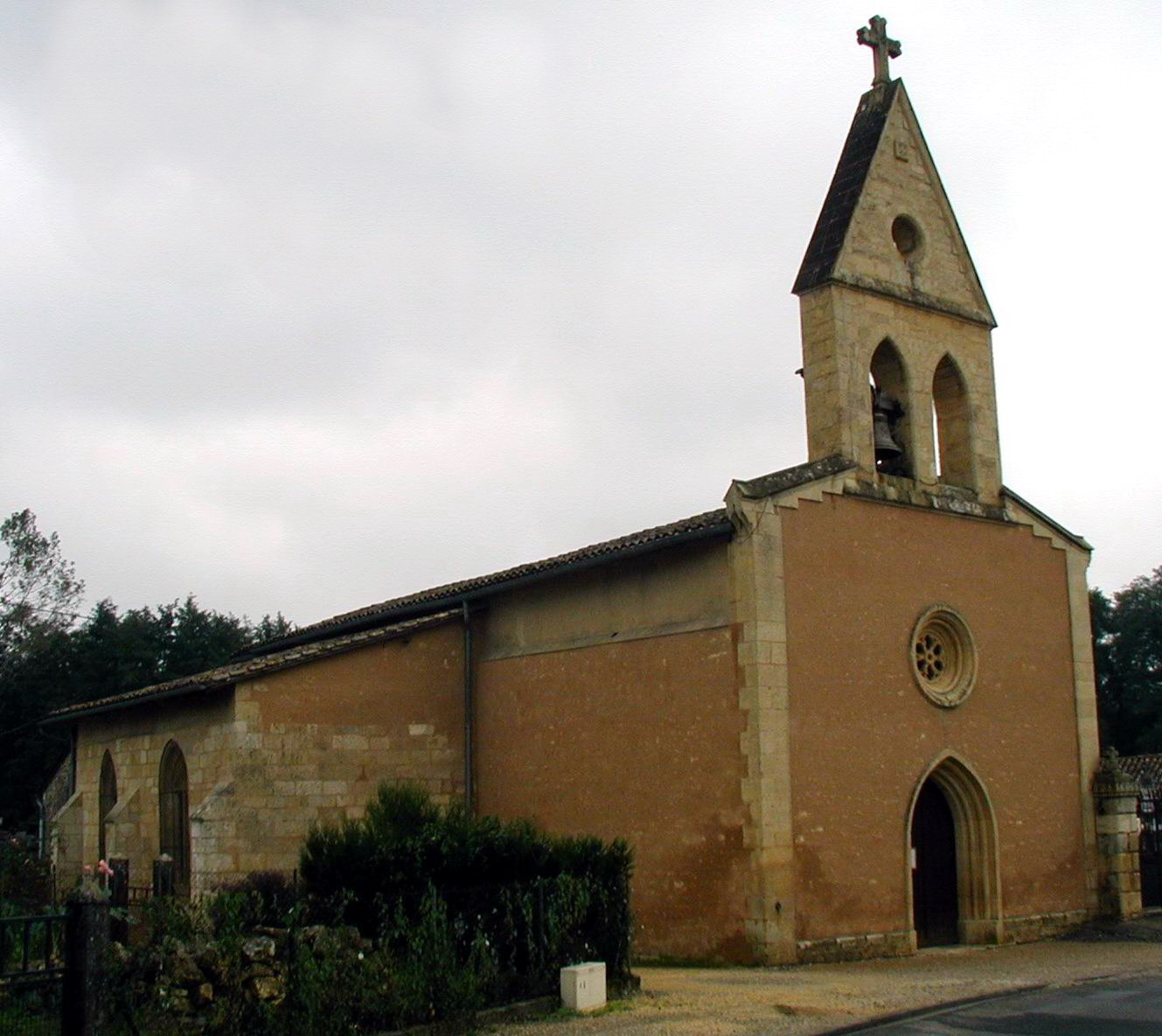
- The church in Salles
- Location of Salles
- Location within France Location within Nouvelle-Aquitaine
- Coordinates: 44°33′00″N 0°52′19″E
- Country: France
- Region: Nouvelle-Aquitaine
- Department: Lot-et-Garonne
- Arrondissement: Villeneuve-sur-Lot
- Canton: Le Haut agenais Périgord
- Intercommunality: Bastides en Haut-Agenais Périgord

Government
  - Mayor (2020–2026): Janik Cazette
- Area^{1}: 21.58 km^{2} (8.33 sq mi)
- Elevation: 101 m (331 ft)
- Highest elevation: 196 m (643 ft)
- Lowest elevation: 84 m (276 ft)
- Population (2023): 288
  - Density: 13.3/km^{2} (34.6/sq mi)
- Time zone: UTC+01:00 (CET)
  - Summer (DST): UTC+02:00 (CEST)
- INSEE/Postal code: 47284 /47150
- ^{1} French Land Register data, which excludes lakes, ponds, glaciers > 1 km^{2} (0.386 sq mi or 247 acres) and river estuaries.

Salles (French pronunciation: [sal]; Occitan: Salas) is a commune in the Lot-et-Garonne department in south-western France.

== Demography ==
Historical population
Year	Pop.	±% p.a.
1968	353	—
1975	330	−0.96%
1982	313	−0.75%
1990	289	−0.99%
1999	257	−1.30%
2007	306	+2.21%
2012	299	−0.46%
2017	293	−0.40%
2023	288	−0.29%
Source: INSEE

== See also ==
- Communes of the Lot-et-Garonne department
