= Bournel =

- Commune
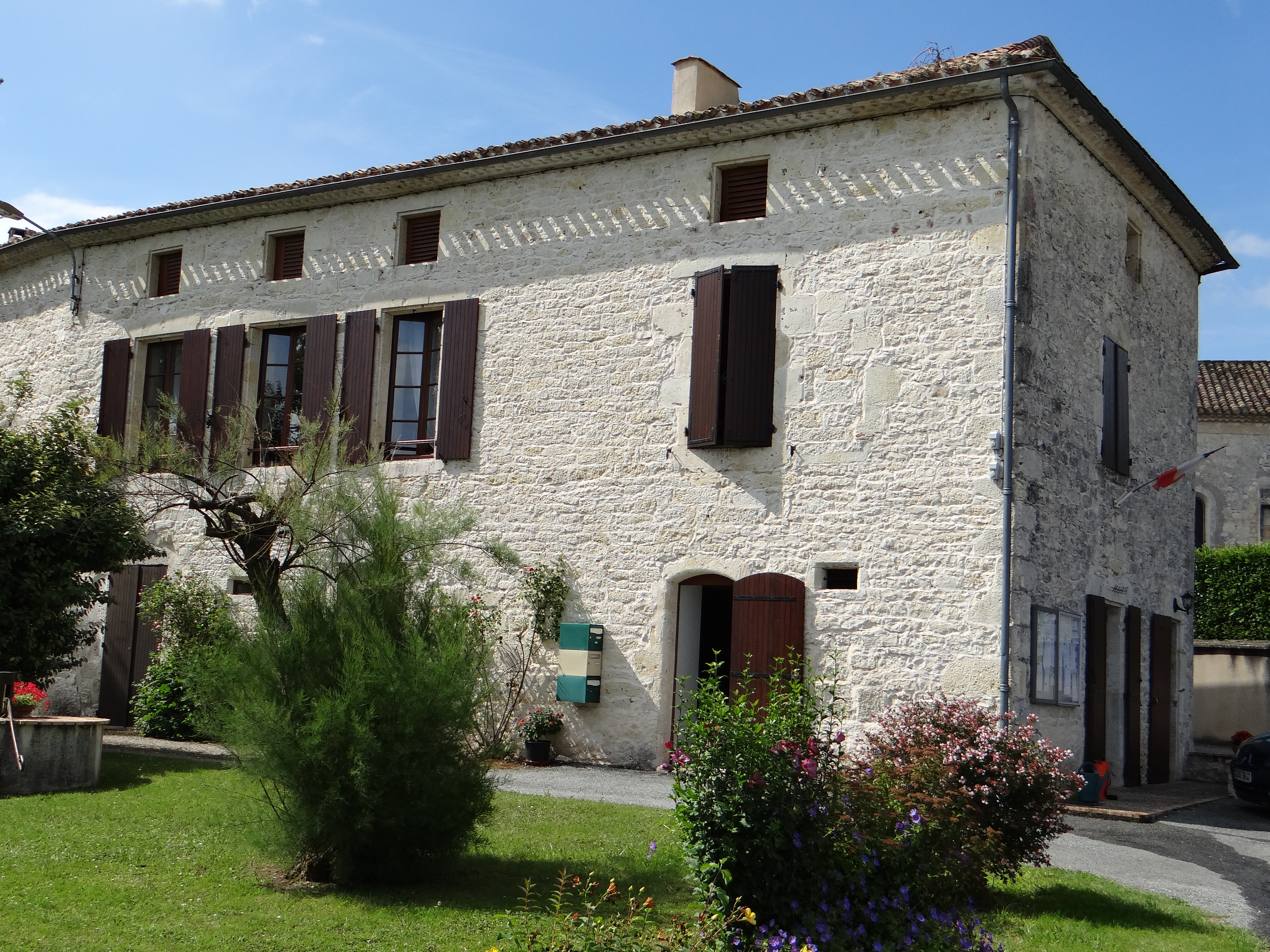
- The town hall in Bournel
- Location of Bournel
- Location within France Location within Nouvelle-Aquitaine
- Coordinates: 44°37′15″N 0°40′18″E
- Country: France
- Region: Nouvelle-Aquitaine
- Department: Lot-et-Garonne
- Arrondissement: Villeneuve-sur-Lot
- Canton: Le Haut agenais Périgord

Government
  - Mayor (2020–2026): Agnès Couderc
- Area^{1}: 14.7 km^{2} (5.7 sq mi)
- Elevation: 100 m (330 ft)
- Highest elevation: 161 m (528 ft)
- Lowest elevation: 72 m (236 ft)
- Population (2023): 247
  - Density: 16.8/km^{2} (43.5/sq mi)
- Time zone: UTC+01:00 (CET)
  - Summer (DST): UTC+02:00 (CEST)
- INSEE/Postal code: 47037 /47210
- ^{1} French Land Register data, which excludes lakes, ponds, glaciers > 1 km^{2} (0.386 sq mi or 247 acres) and river estuaries.

Bournel (French pronunciation: [buʁnɛl]; Occitan: Bornèl) is a commune in the Lot-et-Garonne department in southwestern France.

== Population ==
Historical population
Year	Pop.	±% p.a.
1968	284	—
1975	220	−3.58%
1982	237	+1.07%
1990	228	−0.48%
1999	250	+1.03%
2007	242	−0.41%
2012	257	+1.21%
2017	246	−0.87%
2023	247	+0.07%
Source: INSEE

== See also ==
- Communes of the Lot-et-Garonne department
