= Lacaussade =

- Commune
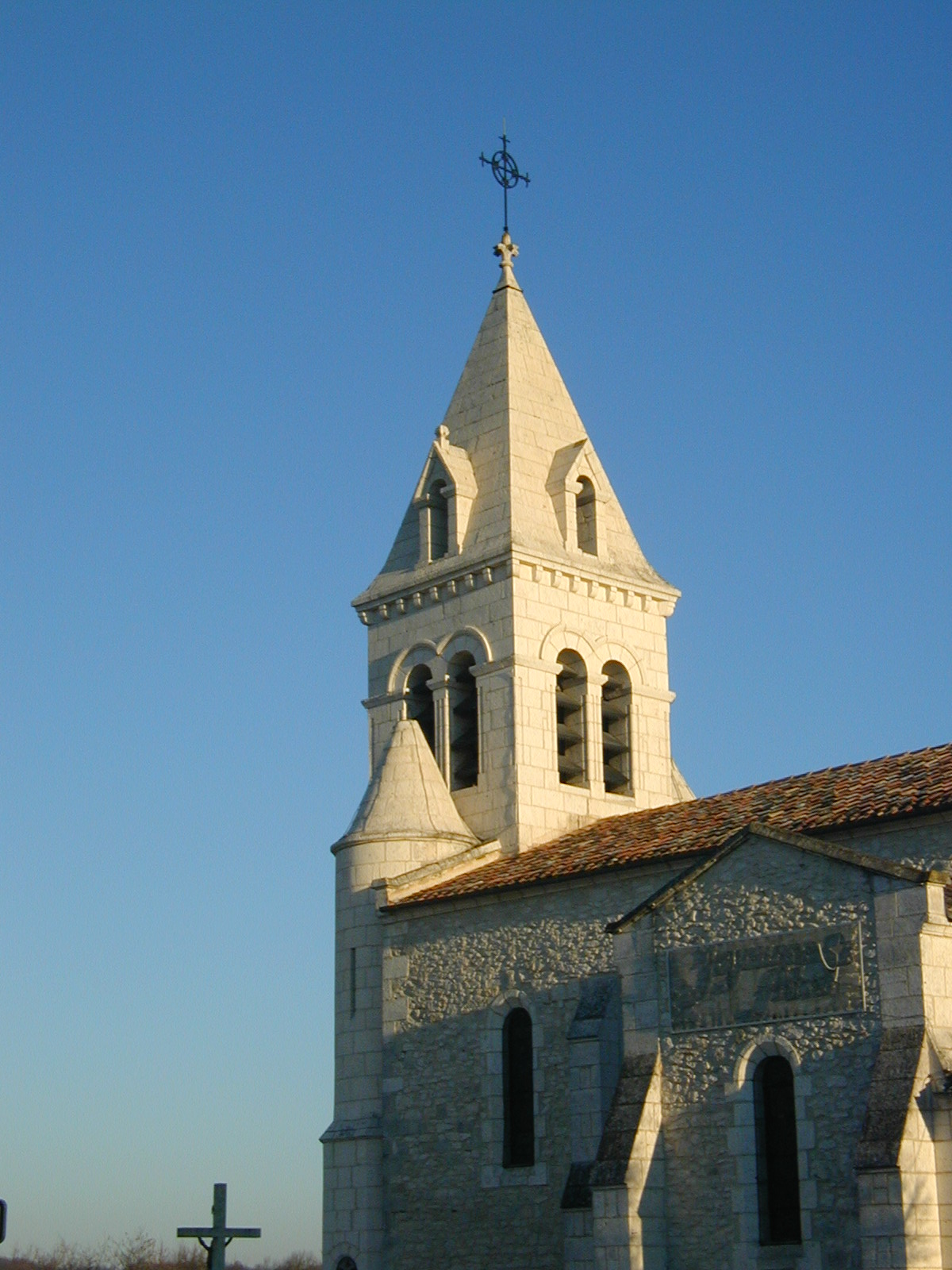
- The church tower in Lacaussade
- Location of Lacaussade
- Location within France Location within Nouvelle-Aquitaine
- Coordinates: 44°30′25″N 0°49′34″E
- Country: France
- Region: Nouvelle-Aquitaine
- Department: Lot-et-Garonne
- Arrondissement: Villeneuve-sur-Lot
- Canton: Le Haut agenais Périgord
- Intercommunality: Bastides en Haut-Agenais Périgord

Government
  - Mayor (2020–2026): Jean-Paul Destieu
- Area^{1}: 10.28 km^{2} (3.97 sq mi)
- Elevation: 130 m (430 ft)
- Highest elevation: 172 m (564 ft)
- Lowest elevation: 78 m (256 ft)
- Population (2023): 210
  - Density: 20/km^{2} (53/sq mi)
- Time zone: UTC+01:00 (CET)
  - Summer (DST): UTC+02:00 (CEST)
- INSEE/Postal code: 47124 /47150
- ^{1} French Land Register data, which excludes lakes, ponds, glaciers > 1 km^{2} (0.386 sq mi or 247 acres) and river estuaries.

Lacaussade (French pronunciation: [lakosad]; Occitan: La Cauçada) is a commune in the Lot-et-Garonne department in south-western France.

== See also ==
- Communes of the Lot-et-Garonne department
