= Doudrac =

- Commune
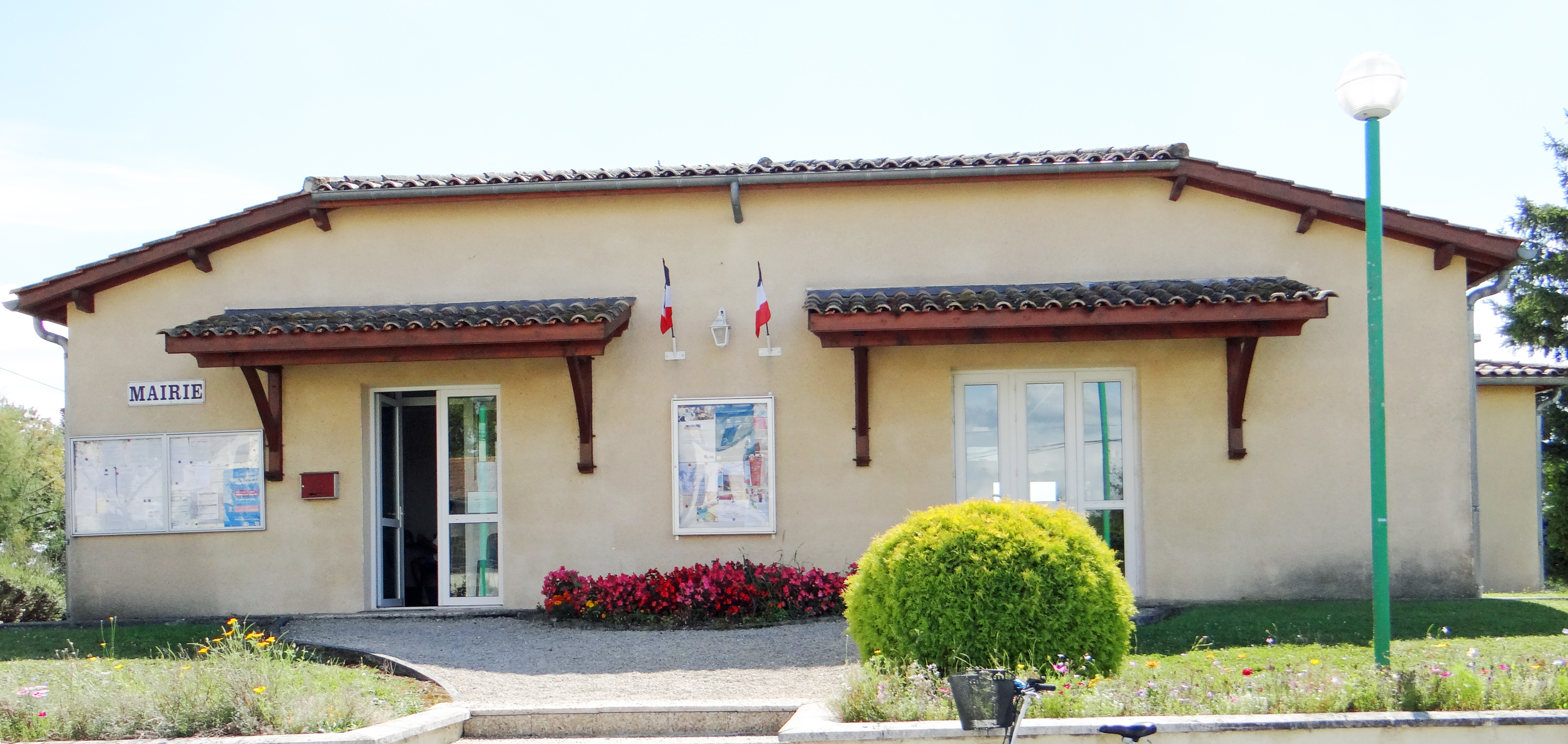
- The town hall in Doudrac
- Location of Doudrac
- Location within France Location within Nouvelle-Aquitaine
- Coordinates: 44°39′34″N 0°40′57″E
- Country: France
- Region: Nouvelle-Aquitaine
- Department: Lot-et-Garonne
- Arrondissement: Villeneuve-sur-Lot
- Canton: Le Haut agenais Périgord
- Intercommunality: Bastides en Haut-Agenais Périgord

Government
  - Mayor (2020–2026): Jacques Bertrand
- Area^{1}: 8.61 km^{2} (3.32 sq mi)
- Elevation: 80 m (260 ft)
- Highest elevation: 115 m (377 ft)
- Lowest elevation: 70 m (230 ft)
- Population (2023): 105
  - Density: 12.2/km^{2} (31.6/sq mi)
- Time zone: UTC+01:00 (CET)
  - Summer (DST): UTC+02:00 (CEST)
- INSEE/Postal code: 47083 /47210
- ^{1} French Land Register data, which excludes lakes, ponds, glaciers > 1 km^{2} (0.386 sq mi or 247 acres) and river estuaries.

Doudrac (French pronunciation: [dudʁak]; Occitan: Dodrac) is a commune in the Lot-et-Garonne department in south-western France.

== See also ==
- Communes of the Lot-et-Garonne department
