= Dévillac =

- Commune
- Location of Dévillac
- Location within France Location within Nouvelle-Aquitaine
- Coordinates: 44°36′28″N 0°47′57″E
- Country: France
- Region: Nouvelle-Aquitaine
- Department: Lot-et-Garonne
- Arrondissement: Villeneuve-sur-Lot
- Canton: Le Haut agenais Périgord
- Intercommunality: Bastides en Haut-Agenais Périgord

Government
  - Mayor (2020–2026): Frédéric Ledun
- Area^{1}: 9.25 km^{2} (3.57 sq mi)
- Elevation: 262 m (860 ft)
- Highest elevation: 191 m (627 ft)
- Lowest elevation: 96 m (315 ft)
- Population (2023): 157
  - Density: 17.0/km^{2} (44.0/sq mi)
- Time zone: UTC+01:00 (CET)
  - Summer (DST): UTC+02:00 (CEST)
- INSEE/Postal code: 47080 /47210
- ^{1} French Land Register data, which excludes lakes, ponds, glaciers > 1 km^{2} (0.386 sq mi or 247 acres) and river estuaries.

Dévillac (French pronunciation: [devijak]; Occitan: Devilhac) is a commune in the Lot-et-Garonne department in south-western France.

== See also ==
- Communes of the Lot-et-Garonne department
