= Saint-Martin-de-Villeréal =

- Commune
- Location of Saint-Martin-de-Villeréal
- Location within France Location within Nouvelle-Aquitaine
- Coordinates: 44°38′40″N 0°49′18″E
- Country: France
- Region: Nouvelle-Aquitaine
- Department: Lot-et-Garonne
- Arrondissement: Villeneuve-sur-Lot
- Canton: Le Haut agenais Périgord

Government
  - Mayor (2020–2026): Patrick Landas
- Area^{1}: 8.22 km^{2} (3.17 sq mi)
- Elevation: 86 m (282 ft)
- Highest elevation: 201 m (659 ft)
- Lowest elevation: 94 m (308 ft)
- Population (2023): 103
  - Density: 12.5/km^{2} (32.5/sq mi)
- Time zone: UTC+01:00 (CET)
  - Summer (DST): UTC+02:00 (CEST)
- INSEE/Postal code: 47256 /47210
- ^{1} French Land Register data, which excludes lakes, ponds, glaciers > 1 km^{2} (0.386 sq mi or 247 acres) and river estuaries.

Saint-Martin-de-Villeréal (French pronunciation: [sɛ̃ maʁtɛ̃ də vilʁeal], literally Saint-Martin of Villeréal; Occitan: Sent Martin de Vilarial) is a commune in the Lot-et-Garonne department in south-western France.

== See also ==
- Communes of the Lot-et-Garonne department
