= Tourliac =

- Commune
- Location of Tourliac
- Location within France Location within Nouvelle-Aquitaine
- Coordinates: 44°41′13″N 0°48′30″E
- Country: France
- Region: Nouvelle-Aquitaine
- Department: Lot-et-Garonne
- Arrondissement: Villeneuve-sur-Lot
- Canton: Le Haut agenais Périgord

Government
  - Mayor (2020–2026): Viviane Chabronnerie
- Area^{1}: 9.83 km^{2} (3.80 sq mi)
- Elevation: 250 m (820 ft)
- Highest elevation: 211 m (692 ft)
- Lowest elevation: 97 m (318 ft)
- Population (2023): 137
  - Density: 13.9/km^{2} (36.1/sq mi)
- Time zone: UTC+01:00 (CET)
  - Summer (DST): UTC+02:00 (CEST)
- INSEE/Postal code: 47311 /47210
- ^{1} French Land Register data, which excludes lakes, ponds, glaciers > 1 km^{2} (0.386 sq mi or 247 acres) and river estuaries.

Tourliac (French pronunciation: [tuʁljak]; Occitan: Trolhac) is a commune in the Lot-et-Garonne department in south-western France.

== See also ==
- Communes of the Lot-et-Garonne department
