= Pailloles =

- Commune
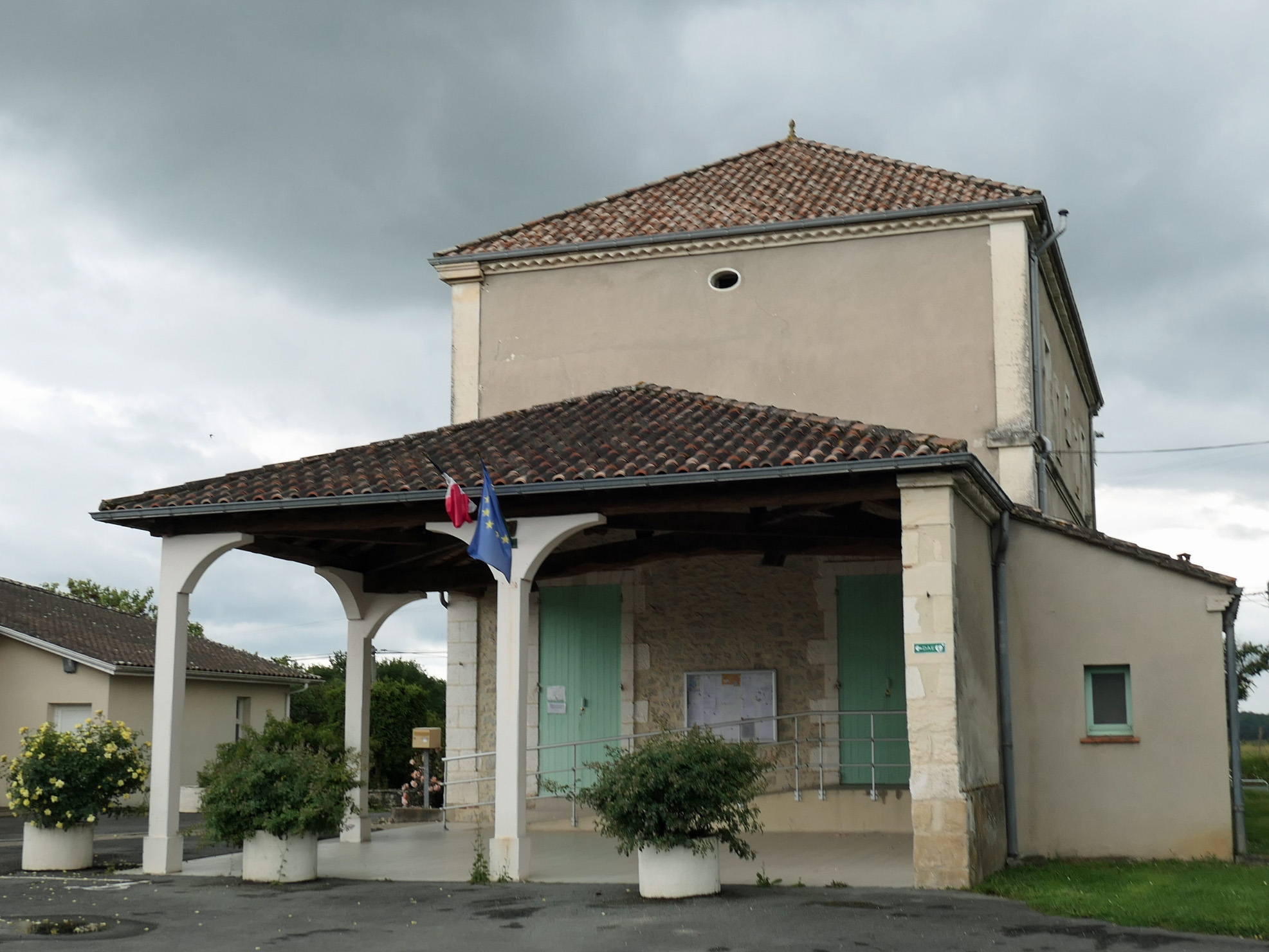
- Pailloles Town hall
- Location of Pailloles
- Location within France Location within Nouvelle-Aquitaine
- Coordinates: 44°28′17″N 0°38′37″E
- Country: France
- Region: Nouvelle-Aquitaine
- Department: Lot-et-Garonne
- Arrondissement: Villeneuve-sur-Lot
- Canton: Le Haut agenais Périgord
- Intercommunality: Bastides en Haut-Agenais Périgord

Government
  - Mayor (2020–2026): Henri Mattana
- Area^{1}: 9.16 km^{2} (3.54 sq mi)
- Elevation: 200 m (660 ft)
- Highest elevation: 180 m (590 ft)
- Lowest elevation: 54 m (177 ft)
- Population (2023): 315
  - Density: 34.4/km^{2} (89.1/sq mi)
- Time zone: UTC+01:00 (CET)
  - Summer (DST): UTC+02:00 (CEST)
- INSEE/Postal code: 47198 /47440
- ^{1} French Land Register data, which excludes lakes, ponds, glaciers > 1 km^{2} (0.386 sq mi or 247 acres) and river estuaries.

Pailloles (French pronunciation: [pajɔl]; Occitan: Las Palhòlas) is a commune in the Lot-et-Garonne department in south-western France.

== Origins of the name ==
The present commune of Pailloles in fact contains two ancient settlements with their own parish churches, the southern part being Pailloles proper while the northern part is Senezelles.

The name of Pailloles appears in a Latin document of the 1400s as Pajoliis and then in the local language of Occitan in 1506 and 1511 as Las Palholas, the first mention in French being as Les Pailloles in 1520. The previous name was that of its church, Sanctus Gervasius de Cantes in Latin or St Gervais de Cantes in French. The meaning of “pailloles” is unclear, possible referring to the houses being roofed with straw (“palea” in Latin and “ palha” in Occitan). The name Senezelles possibly denotes a leper refuge.

== See also ==
- Communes of the Lot-et-Garonne department
