= Paulhiac =

- Commune
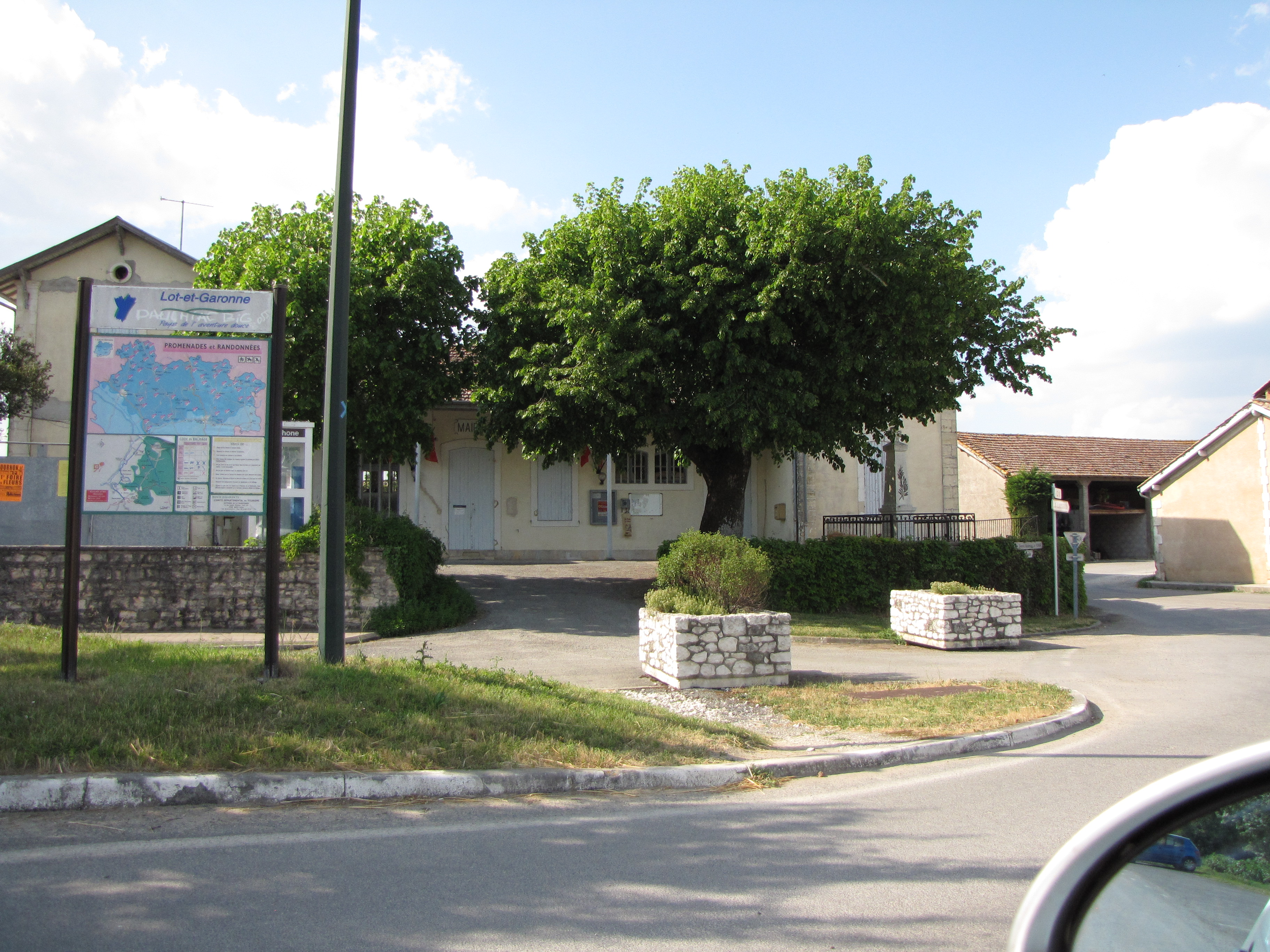
- The town hall in Paulhiac
- Location of Paulhiac
- Location within France Location within Nouvelle-Aquitaine
- Coordinates: 44°33′45″N 0°49′13″E
- Country: France
- Region: Nouvelle-Aquitaine
- Department: Lot-et-Garonne
- Arrondissement: Villeneuve-sur-Lot
- Canton: Le Haut agenais Périgord
- Intercommunality: Bastides en Haut-Agenais Périgord

Government
  - Mayor (2020–2026): Marcel Calmette
- Area^{1}: 21.89 km^{2} (8.45 sq mi)
- Elevation: 149 m (489 ft)
- Highest elevation: 183 m (600 ft)
- Lowest elevation: 83 m (272 ft)
- Population (2023): 304
  - Density: 13.9/km^{2} (36.0/sq mi)
- Time zone: UTC+01:00 (CET)
  - Summer (DST): UTC+02:00 (CEST)
- INSEE/Postal code: 47202 /47150
- ^{1} French Land Register data, which excludes lakes, ponds, glaciers > 1 km^{2} (0.386 sq mi or 247 acres) and river estuaries.

Paulhiac (French pronunciation: [poljak]; Occitan: Paulhac) is a commune in the Lot-et-Garonne department in south-western France.

== See also ==
- Communes of the Lot-et-Garonne department
