= Rives, Lot-et-Garonne =

Rives
- Commune
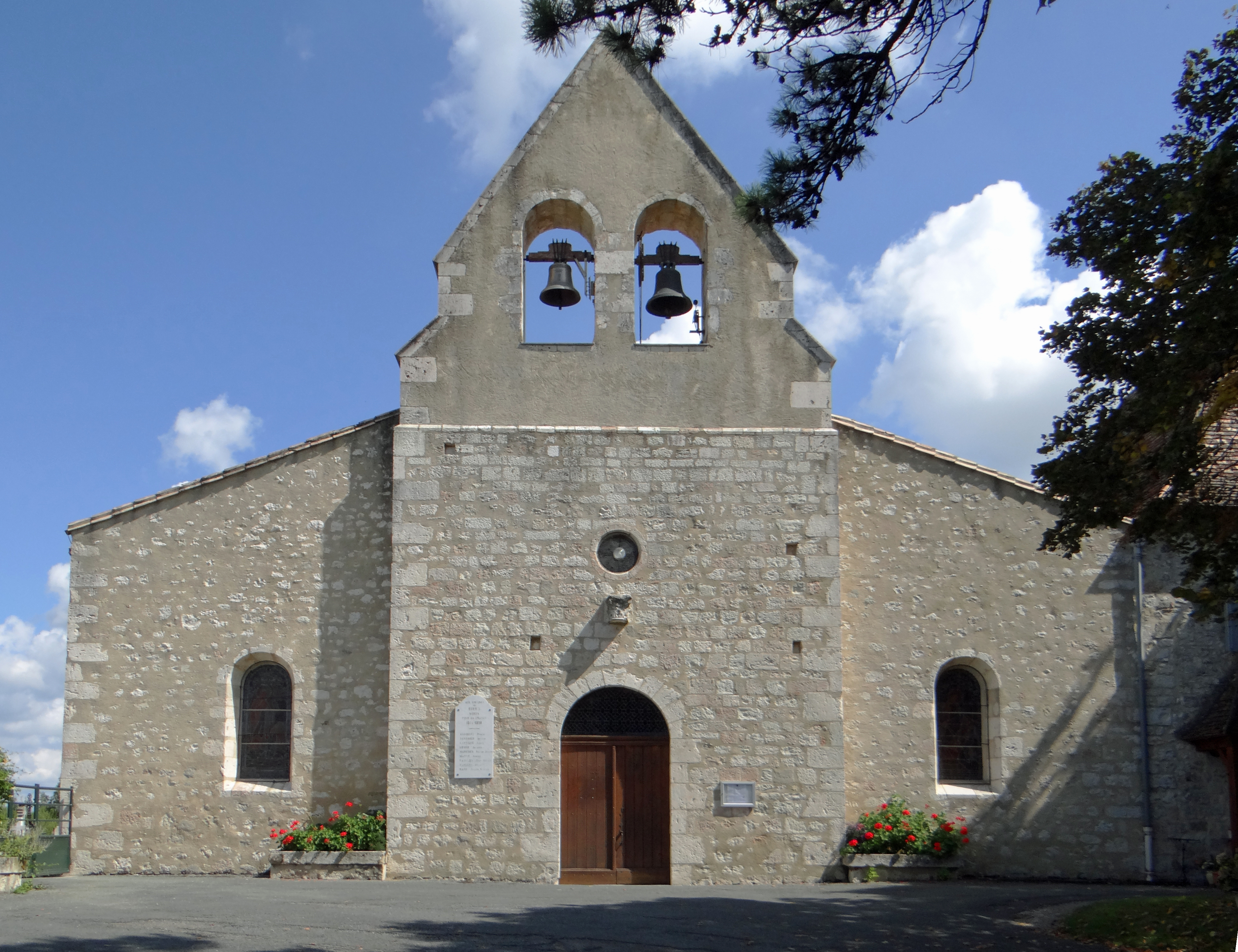
- The church in Rives
- Location of Rives
- Location within France Location within Nouvelle-Aquitaine
- Coordinates: 44°38′45″N 0°44′30″E
- Country: France
- Region: Nouvelle-Aquitaine
- Department: Lot-et-Garonne
- Arrondissement: Villeneuve-sur-Lot
- Canton: Le Haut agenais Périgord

Government
  - Mayor (2020–2026): Alain Vergniaud
- Area^{1}: 12.79 km^{2} (4.94 sq mi)
- Elevation: 120 m (390 ft)
- Highest elevation: 123 m (404 ft)
- Lowest elevation: 79 m (259 ft)
- Population (2023): 194
  - Density: 15.2/km^{2} (39.3/sq mi)
- Time zone: UTC+01:00 (CET)
  - Summer (DST): UTC+02:00 (CEST)
- INSEE/Postal code: 47223 /47210
- ^{1} French Land Register data, which excludes lakes, ponds, glaciers > 1 km^{2} (0.386 sq mi or 247 acres) and river estuaries.

Rives (French pronunciation: [ʁiv]; Occitan: Ribas) is a commune in the Lot-et-Garonne department in southwestern France.

== See also ==
- Communes of the Lot-et-Garonne department
