= Mazières-Naresse =

- Commune
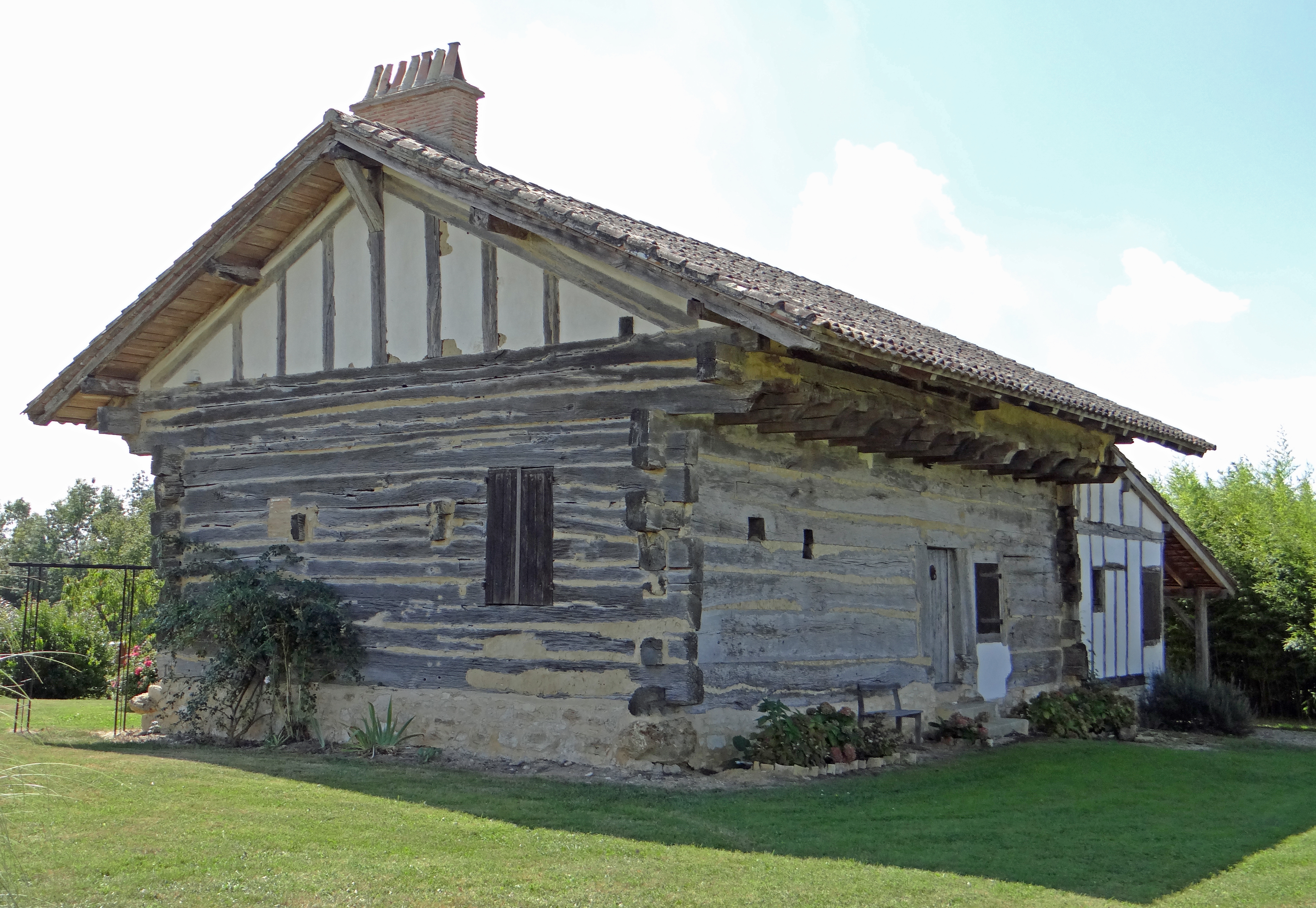
- A stacked-beam house in Mazières-Naresse
- Location of Mazières-Naresse
- Location within France Location within Nouvelle-Aquitaine
- Coordinates: 44°39′14″N 0°42′18″E
- Country: France
- Region: Nouvelle-Aquitaine
- Department: Lot-et-Garonne
- Arrondissement: Villeneuve-sur-Lot
- Canton: Le Haut agenais Périgord
- Intercommunality: Bastides en Haut-Agenais Périgord

Government
  - Mayor (2020–2026): Jean-Paul Pape
- Area^{1}: 8.93 km^{2} (3.45 sq mi)
- Elevation: 90 m (300 ft)
- Highest elevation: 116 m (381 ft)
- Lowest elevation: 75 m (246 ft)
- Population (2023): 96
  - Density: 11/km^{2} (28/sq mi)
- Time zone: UTC+01:00 (CET)
  - Summer (DST): UTC+02:00 (CEST)
- INSEE/Postal code: 47164 /47210
- ^{1} French Land Register data, which excludes lakes, ponds, glaciers > 1 km^{2} (0.386 sq mi or 247 acres) and river estuaries.

Mazières-Naresse (French pronunciation: [mazjɛʁ naʁɛs]; Occitan: Masièras e Naressa) is a commune in the Lot-et-Garonne department in south-western France.

== See also ==
- Communes of the Lot-et-Garonne department
