= Beaugas =

- Commune
- Location of Beaugas
- Location within France Location within Nouvelle-Aquitaine
- Coordinates: 44°30′23″N 0°38′16″E
- Country: France
- Region: Nouvelle-Aquitaine
- Department: Lot-et-Garonne
- Arrondissement: Villeneuve-sur-Lot
- Canton: Le Haut agenais Périgord

Government
  - Mayor (2020–2026): Brigitte Payeras
- Area^{1}: 22.48 km^{2} (8.68 sq mi)
- Elevation: 100 m (330 ft)
- Highest elevation: 220 m (720 ft)
- Lowest elevation: 81 m (266 ft)
- Population (2023): 322
  - Density: 14.3/km^{2} (37.1/sq mi)
- Time zone: UTC+01:00 (CET)
  - Summer (DST): UTC+02:00 (CEST)
- INSEE/Postal code: 47023 /47290
- ^{1} French Land Register data, which excludes lakes, ponds, glaciers > 1 km^{2} (0.386 sq mi or 247 acres) and river estuaries.

Beaugas is a commune in the Lot-et-Garonne department in southwestern France.

== Population ==
Historical population
Year	Pop.	±% p.a.
1968	368	—
1975	316	−2.15%
1982	347	+1.35%
1990	340	−0.25%
1999	349	+0.29%
2007	346	−0.11%
2012	338	−0.47%
2017	359	+1.21%
2023	322	−1.80%
Source: INSEE

== See also ==
- Communes of the Lot-et-Garonne department
