= Saint-Aubin, Lot-et-Garonne =

Saint-Aubin
- Commune
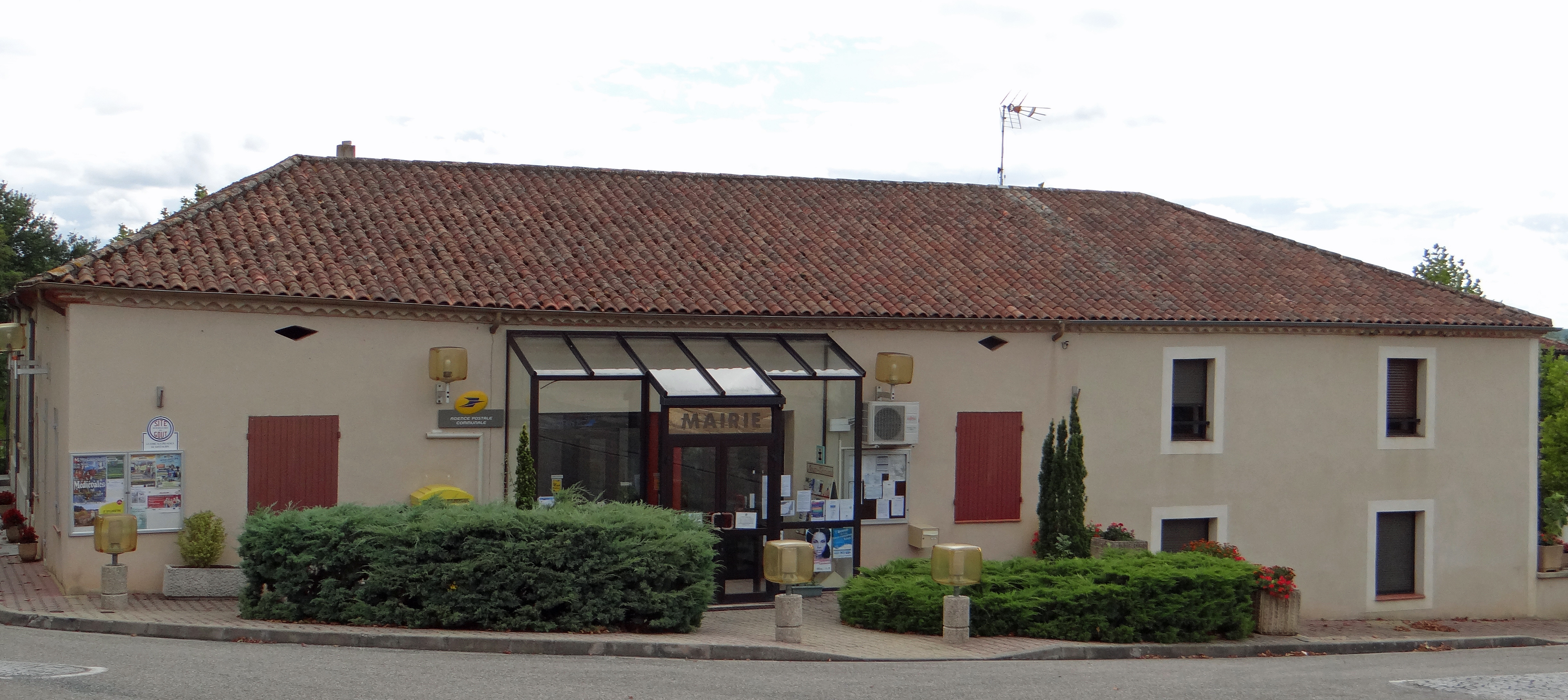
- Location of Saint-Aubin
- Location within France Location within Nouvelle-Aquitaine
- Coordinates: 44°28′38″N 0°51′12″E
- Country: France
- Region: Nouvelle-Aquitaine
- Department: Lot-et-Garonne
- Arrondissement: Villeneuve-sur-Lot
- Canton: Le Haut agenais Périgord

Government
  - Mayor (2020–2026): Guy Poueymidanette
- Area^{1}: 18.51 km^{2} (7.15 sq mi)
- Elevation: 144 m (472 ft)
- Highest elevation: 219 m (719 ft)
- Lowest elevation: 74 m (243 ft)
- Population (2023): 393
  - Density: 21.2/km^{2} (55.0/sq mi)
- Time zone: UTC+01:00 (CET)
  - Summer (DST): UTC+02:00 (CEST)
- INSEE/Postal code: 47230 /47150
- ^{1} French Land Register data, which excludes lakes, ponds, glaciers > 1 km^{2} (0.386 sq mi or 247 acres) and river estuaries.

Saint-Aubin (French pronunciation: [sɛ̃.t‿obɛ̃]; Occitan: Sent Albin) is a commune in the Lot-et-Garonne department in south-western France.

== See also ==
- Communes of the Lot-et-Garonne department
