= Gavaudun =

- Commune
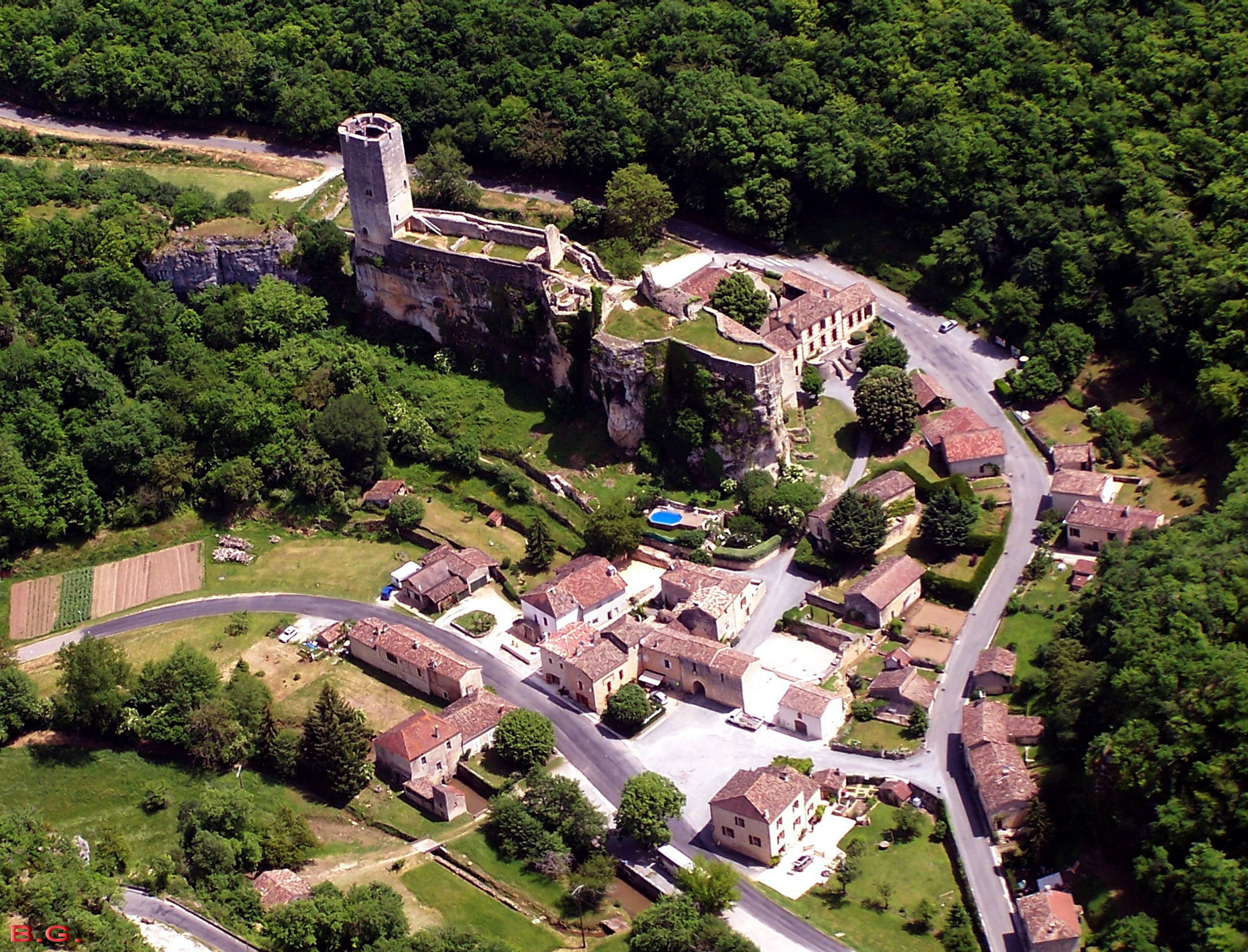
- A general view of Gavaudun
- Location of Gavaudun
- Location within France Location within Nouvelle-Aquitaine
- Coordinates: 44°33′41″N 0°53′18″E
- Country: France
- Region: Nouvelle-Aquitaine
- Department: Lot-et-Garonne
- Arrondissement: Villeneuve-sur-Lot
- Canton: Le Haut agenais Périgord
- Intercommunality: Bastides en Haut-Agenais Périgord

Government
  - Mayor (2020–2026): Adrien Teyssedou
- Area^{1}: 21.33 km^{2} (8.24 sq mi)
- Elevation: 111 m (364 ft)
- Highest elevation: 243 m (797 ft)
- Lowest elevation: 105 m (344 ft)
- Population (2023): 302
  - Density: 14.2/km^{2} (36.7/sq mi)
- Time zone: UTC+01:00 (CET)
  - Summer (DST): UTC+02:00 (CEST)
- INSEE/Postal code: 47109 /47150
- ^{1} French Land Register data, which excludes lakes, ponds, glaciers > 1 km^{2} (0.386 sq mi or 247 acres) and river estuaries.

Gavaudun (French pronunciation: [ɡavodœ̃]) is a commune in the Lot-et-Garonne department in south-western France.

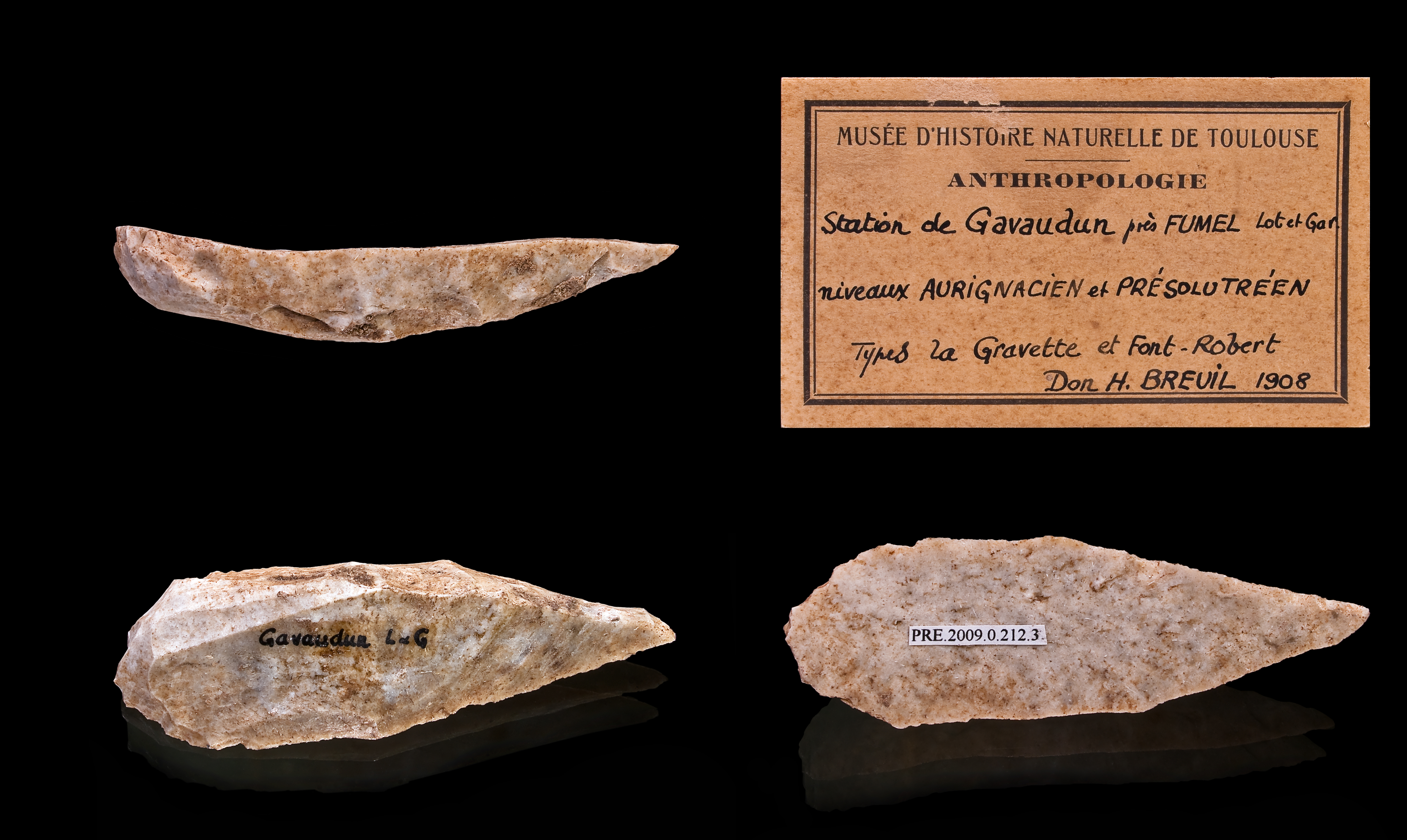
Scraper - Aurignacian - Muséum of Toulouse

== See also ==
- Communes of the Lot-et-Garonne department
