= Castelnaud-de-Gratecambe =

Castelnaud-de-Gratecambe Castèlnuèu de Gratacamba (Occitan)
- Commune
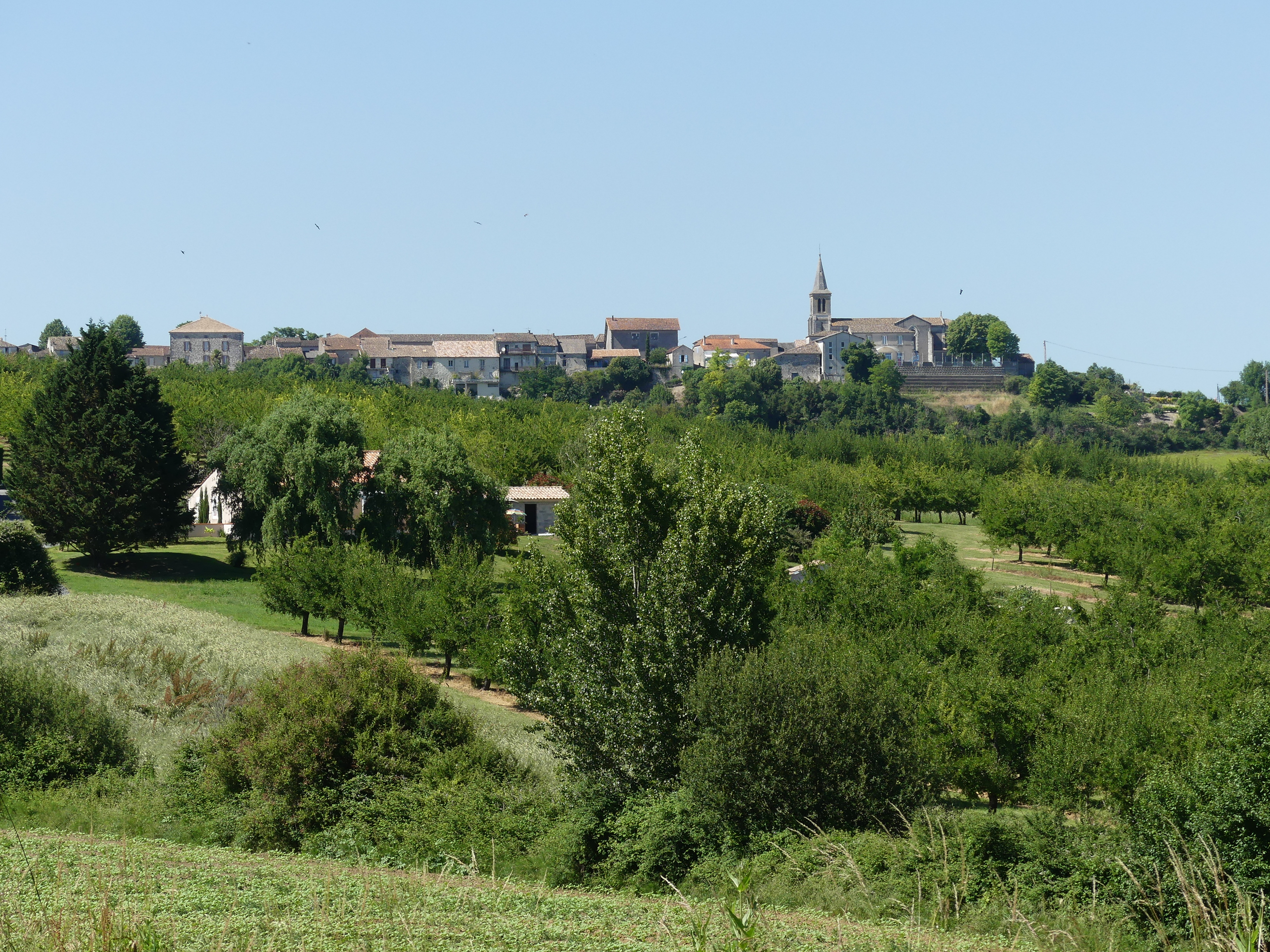
- View of Castelnaud-de-Gratecambe
- Location of Castelnaud-de-Gratecambe
- Location within France Location within Nouvelle-Aquitaine
- Coordinates: 44°29′53″N 0°40′09″E
- Country: France
- Region: Nouvelle-Aquitaine
- Department: Lot-et-Garonne
- Arrondissement: Villeneuve-sur-Lot
- Canton: Le Haut agenais Périgord

Government
  - Mayor (2020–2026): Gilbert Serres
- Area^{1}: 17.23 km^{2} (6.65 sq mi)
- Elevation: 212 m (696 ft)
- Highest elevation: 214 m (702 ft)
- Lowest elevation: 80 m (260 ft)
- Population (2023): 514
  - Density: 29.8/km^{2} (77.3/sq mi)
- Time zone: UTC+01:00 (CET)
  - Summer (DST): UTC+02:00 (CEST)
- INSEE/Postal code: 47055 /47290
- ^{1} French Land Register data, which excludes lakes, ponds, glaciers > 1 km^{2} (0.386 sq mi or 247 acres) and river estuaries.

Castelnaud-de-Gratecambe (French pronunciation: [kastɛlno də ɡʁatkɑ̃b]; Occitan: Castèlnuèu de Gratacamba) is a commune in the Lot-et-Garonne department in the Occitanie region of Southwestern France.

== See also ==
- Communes of the Lot-et-Garonne department
