= Arrondissement of Villeneuve-sur-Lot =

Coordinates: 44°24′N 0°42′E

Villeneuve-sur-Lot
- Arrondissement
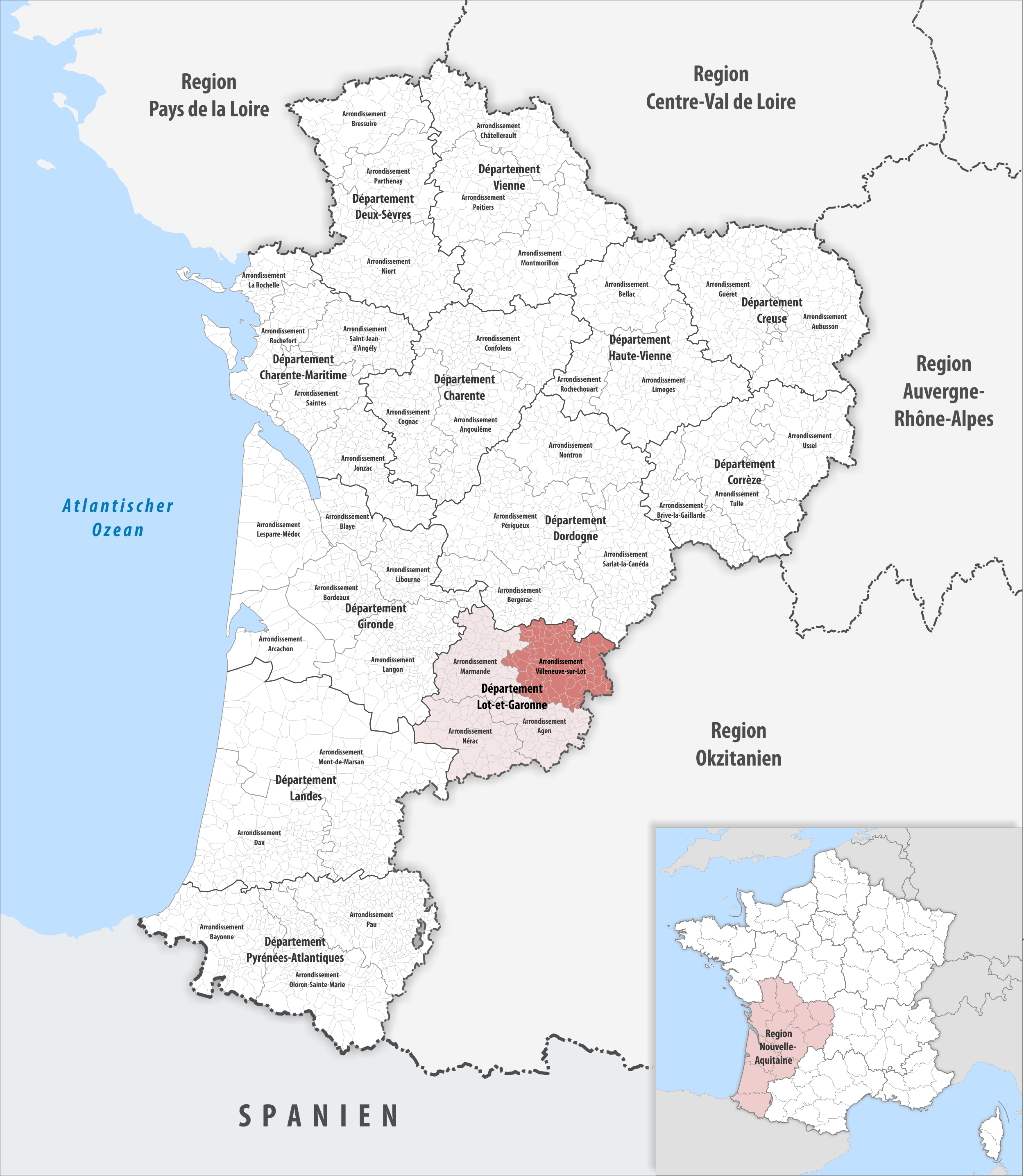
- Location within the region Nouvelle-Aquitaine
- Country: France
- Region: Nouvelle-Aquitaine
- Department: Lot-et-Garonne
- No. of communes: {{{nbcomm}}}
- Area: 1,559.7 km^{2} (602.2 sq mi)
- Population (2023): 89,968
  - Density: 57.683/km^{2} (149.40/sq mi)
- INSEE code: 473

The arrondissement of Villeneuve-sur-Lot is an arrondissement of France in the Lot-et-Garonne department in the Nouvelle-Aquitaine région. It has 92 communes. Its population is 89,282 (2021), and its area is 1,559.7 km^{2} (602.2 sq mi).

== Composition ==
The communes of the arrondissement of Villeneuve-sur-Lot, and their INSEE codes, are:

1. Allez-et-Cazeneuve (47006)
2. Anthé (47011)
3. Auradou (47017)
4. Beaugas (47023)
5. Bias (47027)
6. Blanquefort-sur-Briolance (47029)
7. Boudy-de-Beauregard (47033)
8. Bourlens (47036)
9. Bournel (47037)
10. Cahuzac (47044)
11. Cancon (47048)
12. Casseneuil (47049)
13. Castelnaud-de-Gratecambe (47055)
14. Castillonnès (47057)
15. Cavarc (47063)
16. Cazideroque (47064)
17. Condezaygues (47070)
18. Courbiac (47072)
19. Cuzorn (47077)
20. Dausse (47079)
21. Dévillac (47080)
22. Dolmayrac (47081)
23. Doudrac (47083)
24. Douzains (47084)
25. Ferrensac (47096)
26. Fongrave (47099)
27. Frespech (47105)
28. Fumel (47106)
29. Gavaudun (47109)
30. Hautefage-la-Tour (47117)
31. La Sauvetat-sur-Lède (47291)
32. Lacapelle-Biron (47123)
33. Lacaussade (47124)
34. Lalandusse (47132)
35. Laussou (47141)
36. Le Temple-sur-Lot (47306)
37. Lédat (47146)
38. Lougratte (47152)
39. Masquières (47160)
40. Massels (47161)
41. Massoulès (47162)
42. Mazières-Naresse (47164)
43. Monbahus (47170)
44. Monclar (47173)
45. Monflanquin (47175)
46. Monségur (47178)
47. Monsempron-Libos (47179)
48. Montagnac-sur-Lède (47181)
49. Montastruc (47182)
50. Montauriol (47183)
51. Montaut (47184)
52. Montayral (47185)
53. Monviel (47192)
54. Moulinet (47193)
55. Pailloles (47198)
56. Parranquet (47200)
57. Paulhiac (47202)
58. Penne-d'Agenais (47203)
59. Pinel-Hauterive (47206)
60. Pujols (47215)
61. Rayet (47219)
62. Rives (47223)
63. Saint-Antoine-de-Ficalba (47228)
64. Saint-Aubin (47230)
65. Sainte-Colombe-de-Villeneuve (47237)
66. Sainte-Livrade-sur-Lot (47252)
67. Saint-Étienne-de-Fougères (47239)
68. Saint-Étienne-de-Villeréal (47240)
69. Saint-Eutrope-de-Born (47241)
70. Saint-Front-sur-Lémance (47242)
71. Saint-Georges (47328)
72. Saint-Martin-de-Villeréal (47256)
73. Saint-Maurice-de-Lestapel (47259)
74. Saint-Pastour (47265)
75. Saint-Quentin-du-Dropt (47272)
76. Saint-Sylvestre-sur-Lot (47280)
77. Saint-Vite (47283)
78. Salles (47284)
79. Sauveterre-la-Lémance (47292)
80. Savignac-sur-Leyze (47295)
81. Sembas (47297)
82. Sérignac-Péboudou (47299)
83. Thézac (47307)
84. Tombebœuf (47309)
85. Tourliac (47311)
86. Tournon-d'Agenais (47312)
87. Tourtrès (47313)
88. Trémons (47314)
89. Trentels (47315)
90. Villebramar (47319)
91. Villeneuve-sur-Lot (47323)
92. Villeréal (47324)

== History ==
The arrondissement of Villeneuve-sur-Lot was created in 1800.

As a result of the reorganisation of the cantons of France which came into effect in 2015, the borders of the cantons are no longer related to the borders of the arrondissements. The cantons of the arrondissement of Villeneuve-sur-Lot were, as of January 2015:

1. Cancon
2. Castillonnès
3. Fumel
4. Monclar
5. Monflanquin
6. Penne-d'Agenais
7. Sainte-Livrade-sur-Lot
8. Tournon-d'Agenais
9. Villeneuve-sur-Lot-Nord
10. Villeneuve-sur-Lot-Sud
11. Villeréal
