= Rayet =

- Commune
- Location of Rayet
- Location within France Location within Nouvelle-Aquitaine
- Coordinates: 44°40′41″N 0°46′35″E
- Country: France
- Region: Nouvelle-Aquitaine
- Department: Lot-et-Garonne
- Arrondissement: Villeneuve-sur-Lot
- Canton: Le Haut agenais Périgord
- Intercommunality: Bastides en Haut-Agenais Périgord

Government
  - Mayor (2020–2026): Aimé Bertholom
- Area^{1}: 10.02 km^{2} (3.87 sq mi)
- Elevation: 110 m (360 ft)
- Highest elevation: 167 m (548 ft)
- Lowest elevation: 87 m (285 ft)
- Population (2023): 172
  - Density: 17.2/km^{2} (44.5/sq mi)
- Time zone: UTC+01:00 (CET)
  - Summer (DST): UTC+02:00 (CEST)
- INSEE/Postal code: 47219 /47210
- ^{1} French Land Register data, which excludes lakes, ponds, glaciers > 1 km^{2} (0.386 sq mi or 247 acres) and river estuaries.

Rayet is a commune in the Lot-et-Garonne department in south-western France.

== See also ==
- Communes of the Lot-et-Garonne department
