= Canton of Le Haut Agenais Périgord =

Coordinates: 44.53°N 0.77°E

The canton of Le Haut Agenais Périgord is an administrative division of the Lot-et-Garonne department, southwestern France. It was created at the French canton reorganisation which came into effect in March 2015. Its seat is in Monflanquin.

It consists of the following communes:

1. Beaugas
2. Boudy-de-Beauregard
3. Bournel
4. Cancon
5. Castelnaud-de-Gratecambe
6. Dévillac
7. Doudrac
8. Gavaudun
9. Lacaussade
10. Laussou
11. Mazières-Naresse
12. Monbahus
13. Monflanquin
14. Monségur
15. Montagnac-sur-Lède
16. Montaut
17. Monviel
18. Moulinet
19. Pailloles
20. Parranquet
21. Paulhiac
22. Rayet
23. Rives
24. Saint-Aubin
25. Saint-Étienne-de-Villeréal
26. Saint-Eutrope-de-Born
27. Saint-Martin-de-Villeréal
28. Saint-Maurice-de-Lestapel
29. Salles
30. La Sauvetat-sur-Lède
31. Savignac-sur-Leyze
32. Tourliac
33. Villeréal
