= Montaut, Lot-et-Garonne =

Montaut
- Commune
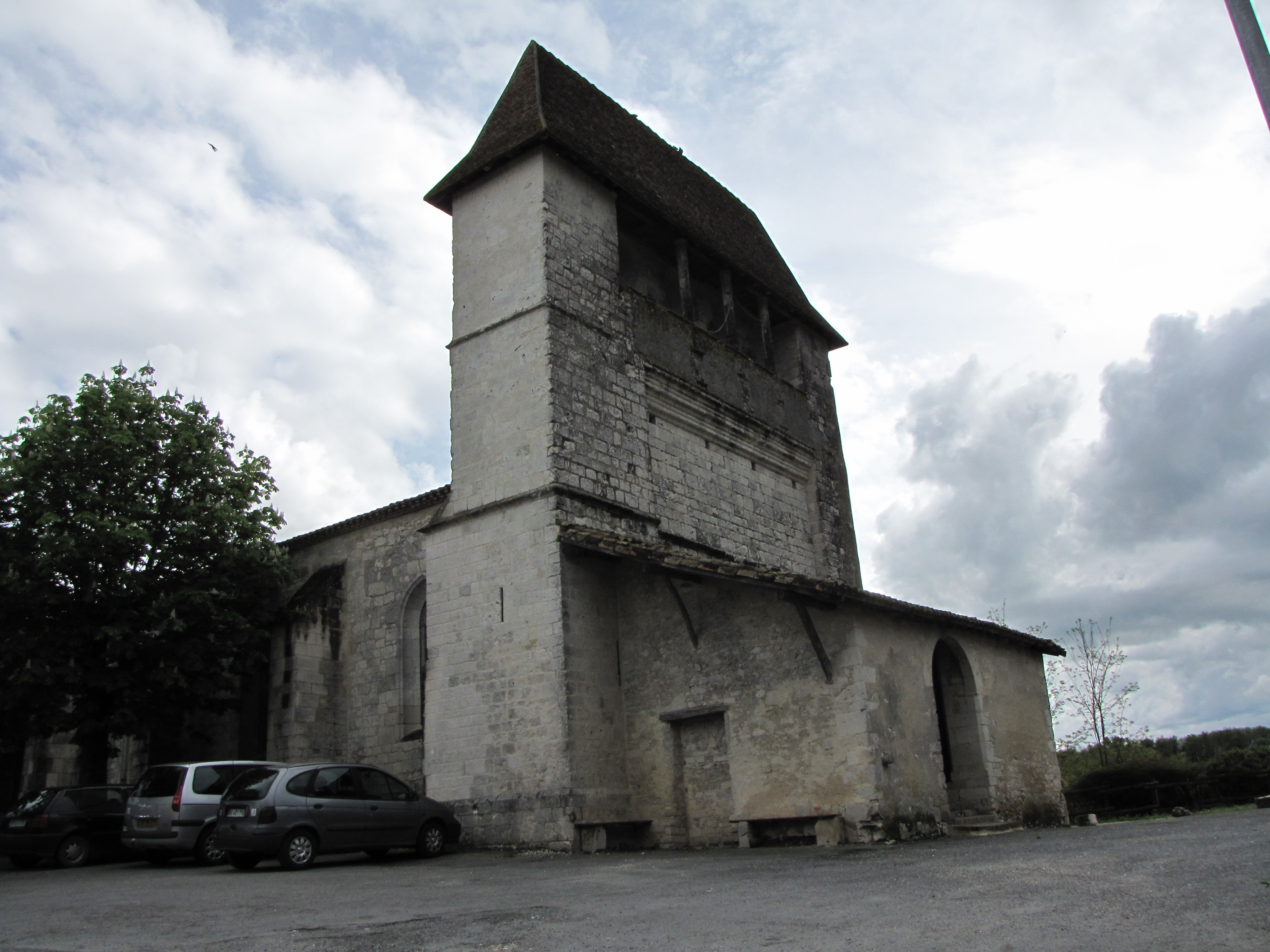
- The church in Montaut
- Location of Montaut
- Location within France Location within Nouvelle-Aquitaine
- Coordinates: 44°36′17″N 0°40′17″E
- Country: France
- Region: Nouvelle-Aquitaine
- Department: Lot-et-Garonne
- Arrondissement: Villeneuve-sur-Lot
- Canton: Le Haut agenais Périgord
- Intercommunality: Bastides en Haut-Agenais Périgord

Government
  - Mayor (2020–2026): Alain Lacour
- Area^{1}: 14.19 km^{2} (5.48 sq mi)
- Elevation: 105 m (344 ft)
- Highest elevation: 190 m (620 ft)
- Lowest elevation: 79 m (259 ft)
- Population (2023): 253
  - Density: 17.8/km^{2} (46.2/sq mi)
- Time zone: UTC+01:00 (CET)
  - Summer (DST): UTC+02:00 (CEST)
- INSEE/Postal code: 47184 /47210
- ^{1} French Land Register data, which excludes lakes, ponds, glaciers > 1 km^{2} (0.386 sq mi or 247 acres) and river estuaries.

Montaut (French pronunciation: [mɔ̃to]) is a commune in the Lot-et-Garonne department in south-western France.

== See also ==
- Communes of the Lot-et-Garonne department
