= Monviel =

- Commune
- Coat of arms
- Location of Monviel
- Location within France Location within Nouvelle-Aquitaine
- Coordinates: 44°34′11″N 0°32′44″E
- Country: France
- Region: Nouvelle-Aquitaine
- Department: Lot-et-Garonne
- Arrondissement: Villeneuve-sur-Lot
- Canton: Le Haut agenais Périgord
- Intercommunality: Bastides en Haut-Agenais Périgord

Government
  - Mayor (2020–2026): Monique Auché
- Area^{1}: 6.23 km^{2} (2.41 sq mi)
- Elevation: 110 m (360 ft)
- Highest elevation: 162 m (531 ft)
- Lowest elevation: 76 m (249 ft)
- Population (2023): 76
  - Density: 12/km^{2} (32/sq mi)
- Time zone: UTC+01:00 (CET)
  - Summer (DST): UTC+02:00 (CEST)
- INSEE/Postal code: 47192 /47290
- ^{1} French Land Register data, which excludes lakes, ponds, glaciers > 1 km^{2} (0.386 sq mi or 247 acres) and river estuaries.

Monviel (French pronunciation: [mɔ̃vjɛl]; Occitan: Montvièlh) is a commune in the Lot-et-Garonne department in south-western France.

The population of Monviel in 2018 was 79. The town's area is 6.2 km².

== See also ==
- Communes of the Lot-et-Garonne department
