= Pinel-Hauterive =

- Commune
- Coat of arms
- Location of Pinel-Hauterive
- Location within France Location within Nouvelle-Aquitaine
- Coordinates: 44°26′23″N 0°34′06″E
- Country: France
- Region: Nouvelle-Aquitaine
- Department: Lot-et-Garonne
- Arrondissement: Villeneuve-sur-Lot
- Canton: Le Livradais
- Intercommunality: CC Lot et Tolzac

Government
  - Mayor (2020–2026): Jean-Pierre Sagnette
- Area^{1}: 21.77 km^{2} (8.41 sq mi)
- Highest elevation: 204 m (669 ft)
- Lowest elevation: 37 m (121 ft)
- Population (2023): 564
  - Density: 25.9/km^{2} (67.1/sq mi)
- Time zone: UTC+01:00 (CET)
  - Summer (DST): UTC+02:00 (CEST)
- INSEE/Postal code: 47206 /47380
- ^{1} French Land Register data, which excludes lakes, ponds, glaciers > 1 km^{2} (0.386 sq mi or 247 acres) and river estuaries.

Pinel-Hauterive (French pronunciation: [pinɛl otʁiv]; Occitan: Pinuèlh e Autariba) is a commune in the Lot-et-Garonne department in south-western France.

== See also ==
- Communes of the Lot-et-Garonne department
