= Saint-Eutrope-de-Born =

- Commune
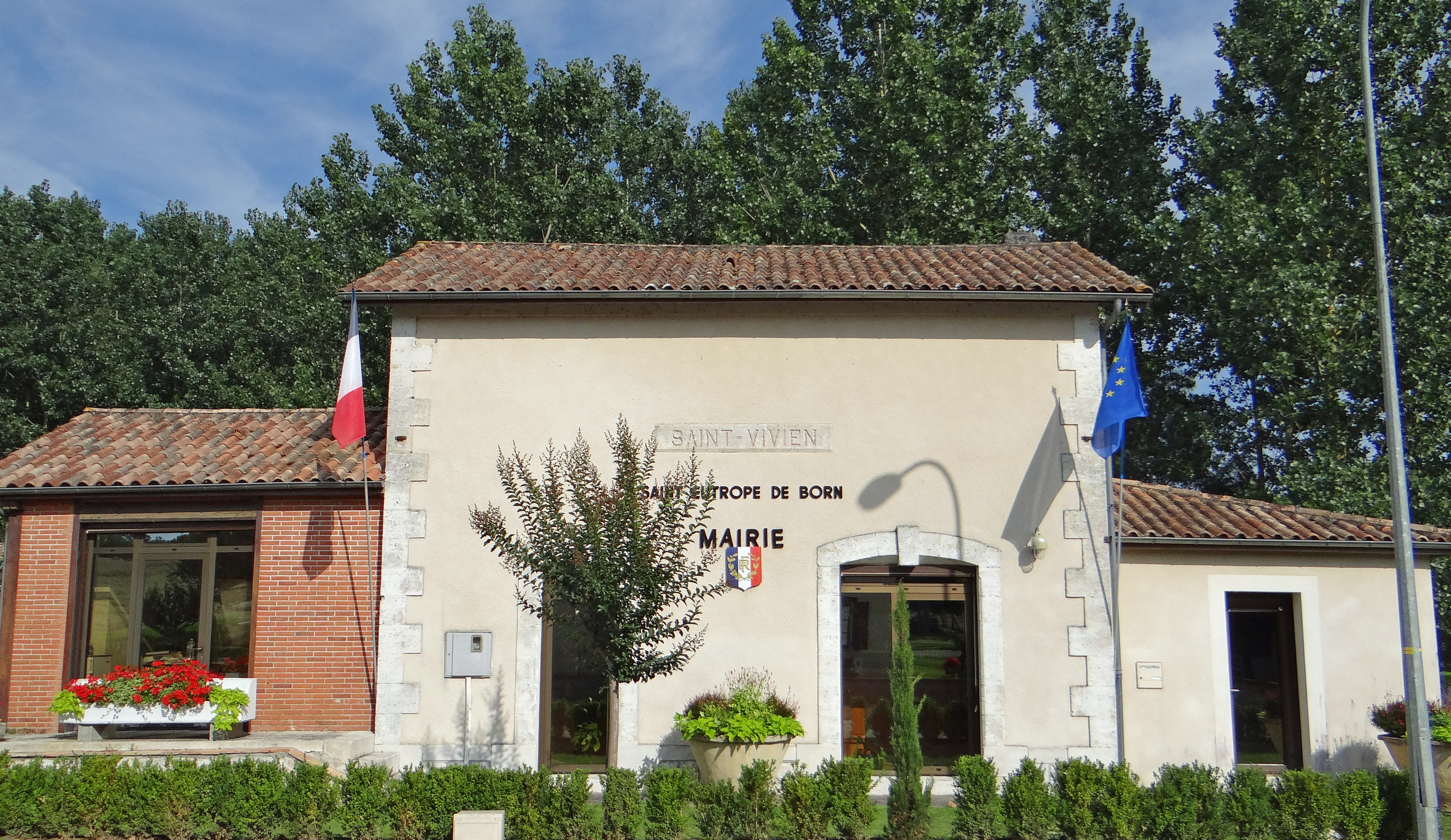
- The town hall in Saint-Eutrope-de-Born
- Location of Saint-Eutrope-de-Born
- Location within France Location within Nouvelle-Aquitaine
- Coordinates: 44°34′11″N 0°41′58″E
- Country: France
- Region: Nouvelle-Aquitaine
- Department: Lot-et-Garonne
- Arrondissement: Villeneuve-sur-Lot
- Canton: Le Haut agenais Périgord

Government
  - Mayor (2020–2026): Jocelyne Colliandre
- Area^{1}: 38.28 km^{2} (14.78 sq mi)
- Elevation: 150 m (490 ft)
- Highest elevation: 185 m (607 ft)
- Lowest elevation: 83 m (272 ft)
- Population (2023): 690
  - Density: 18/km^{2} (47/sq mi)
- Time zone: UTC+01:00 (CET)
  - Summer (DST): UTC+02:00 (CEST)
- INSEE/Postal code: 47241 /47210
- ^{1} French Land Register data, which excludes lakes, ponds, glaciers > 1 km^{2} (0.386 sq mi or 247 acres) and river estuaries.

Saint-Eutrope-de-Born (French pronunciation: [sɛ̃.t‿øtʁɔp də bɔʁn]; Occitan: Sent Estròpi de Bòrn) is a commune in the Lot-et-Garonne department in south-western France.

== See also ==
- Communes of the Lot-et-Garonne department
