= Communes of the Lot-et-Garonne department =

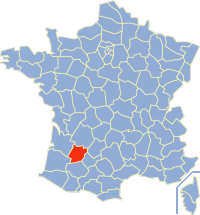

The following is a list of the 319 communes of the French department of Lot-et-Garonne.

The communes cooperate in the following intercommunalities (as of 2025):

- CA Agglomération d'Agen
- Communauté d'agglomération du Grand Villeneuvois
- CA Val de Garonne Agglomération
- Communauté de communes Albret Communauté
- Communauté de communes des Bastides en Haut Agenais Périgord
- Communauté de communes du Confluent et des Coteaux de Prayssas
- Communauté de communes des Coteaux et Landes de Gascogne
- Communauté de communes des Deux Rives (partly)
- Communauté de communes Fumel Vallée du Lot
- Communauté de communes Lot et Tolzac
- Communauté de communes du Pays de Duras
- Communauté de communes du Pays de Lauzun

INSEE	Postal	Commune
47001	47000	Agen
47002	47350	Agmé
47003	47800	Agnac
47004	47190	Aiguillon
47005	47800	Allemans-du-Dropt
47006	47110	Allez-et-Cazeneuve
47007	47420	Allons
47008	47160	Ambrus
47009	47170	Andiran
47010	47700	Antagnac
47011	47370	Anthé
47012	47700	Anzex
47013	47250	Argenton
47014	47800	Armillac
47015	47220	Astaffort
47016	47310	Aubiac
47017	47140	Auradou
47018	47120	Auriac-sur-Dropt
47019	47480	Bajamont
47020	47120	Baleyssagues
47021	47230	Barbaste
47022	47130	Bazens
47023	47290	Beaugas
47024	47200	Beaupuy
47025	47470	Beauville
47026	47700	Beauziac
47027	47300	Bias
47028	47200	Birac-sur-Trec
47029	47500	Blanquefort-sur-Briolance
47030	47470	Blaymont
47031	47550	Boé
47032	47240	Bon-Encontre
47033	47290	Boudy-de-Beauregard
47034	47250	Bouglon
47035	47410	Bourgougnague
47036	47370	Bourlens
47037	47210	Bournel
47038	47320	Bourran
47039	47420	Boussès
47040	47310	Brax
47041	47130	Bruch
47042	47260	Brugnac
47043	47160	Buzet-sur-Baïse
47044	47330	Cahuzac
47045	47600	Calignac
47046	47430	Calonges
47047	47350	Cambes
47048	47290	Cancon
47049	47440	Casseneuil
47050	47340	Cassignas
47051	47240	Castelculier
47052	47700	Casteljaloux
47053	47340	Castella
47054	47260	Castelmoron-sur-Lot
47055	47290	Castelnaud-de-Gratecambe
47056	47180	Castelnau-sur-Gupie
47057	47330	Castillonnès
47058	47160	Caubeyres
47059	47120	Caubon-Saint-Sauveur
47060	47220	Caudecoste
47061	47430	Caumont-sur-Garonne
47062	47470	Cauzac
47063	47330	Cavarc
47064	47370	Cazideroque
47065	47320	Clairac
47066	47130	Clermont-Dessous
47067	47270	Clermont-Soubiran
47068	47250	Cocumont
47069	47450	Colayrac-Saint-Cirq
47070	47500	Condezaygues
47071	47260	Coulx
47072	47370	Courbiac
47073	47360	Cours
47074	47180	Couthures-sur-Garonne
47075	47340	La Croix-Blanche
47076	47220	Cuq
47077	47500	Cuzorn
47078	47160	Damazan
47079	47140	Dausse
47080	47210	Dévillac
47081	47110	Dolmayrac
47082	47470	Dondas
47083	47210	Doudrac
47084	47330	Douzains
47085	47420	Durance
47086	47120	Duras
47087	47470	Engayrac
47088	47350	Escassefort
47089	47120	Esclottes
47090	47600	Espiens
47091	47310	Estillac
47092	47220	Fals
47093	47700	Fargues-sur-Ourbise
47094	47400	Fauguerolles
47095	47400	Fauillet
47096	47330	Ferrensac
47097	47230	Feugarolles
47098	47600	Fieux
47099	47260	Fongrave
47100	47510	Foulayronnes
47101	47200	Fourques-sur-Garonne
47102	47600	Francescas
47103	47600	Fréchou
47104	47360	Frégimont
47105	47140	Frespech
47106	47500	Fumel
47107	47190	Galapian
47108	47200	Gaujac
47109	47150	Gavaudun
47110	47400	Gontaud-de-Nogaret
47111	47260	Granges-sur-Lot
47112	47400	Grateloup-Saint-Gayrand
47113	47270	Grayssas
47114	47250	Grézet-Cavagnan
47115	47250	Guérin
47117	47340	Hautefage-la-Tour
47118	47400	Hautesvignes
47119	47420	Houeillès
47120	47180	Jusix
47121	47250	Labastide-Castel-Amouroux
47122	47350	Labretonie
47123	47150	Lacapelle-Biron
47124	47150	Lacaussade
47125	47360	Lacépède
47126	47350	Lachapelle
47127	47320	Lafitte-sur-Lot
47128	47240	Lafox
47129	47190	Lagarrigue
47130	47400	Lagruère
47131	47180	Lagupie
47132	47330	Lalandusse
47133	47310	Lamontjoie
47134	47170	Lannes
47135	47260	Laparade
47136	47800	Laperche
47137	47310	Laplume
47138	47340	Laroque-Timbaut
47139	47600	Lasserre
47140	47360	Laugnac
47141	47150	Laussou
47142	47410	Lauzun
47143	47230	Lavardac
47144	47800	Lavergne
47145	47390	Layrac
47146	47300	Lédat
47147	47120	Lévignac-de-Guyenne
47148	47700	Leyritz-Moncassin
47150	47200	Longueville
47151	47120	Loubès-Bernac
47152	47290	Lougratte
47154	47360	Lusignan-Petit
47155	47360	Madaillan
47156	47200	Marcellus
47157	47200	Marmande
47158	47220	Marmont-Pachas
47159	47430	Le Mas-d'Agenais
47160	47370	Masquières
47161	47140	Massels
47162	47140	Massoulès
47163	47200	Mauvezin-sur-Gupie

INSEE	Postal	Commune
47164	47210	Mazières-Naresse
47165	47180	Meilhan-sur-Garonne
47167	47170	Mézin
47168	47800	Miramont-de-Guyenne
47169	47310	Moirax
47170	47290	Monbahus
47171	47340	Monbalen
47172	47310	Moncaut
47173	47380	Monclar
47174	47600	Moncrabeau
47175	47150	Monflanquin
47177	47160	Monheurt
47178	47150	Monségur
47179	47500	Monsempron-Libos
47180	47600	Montagnac-sur-Auvignon
47181	47150	Montagnac-sur-Lède
47182	47380	Montastruc
47183	47330	Montauriol
47184	47210	Montaut
47185	47500	Montayral
47186	47130	Montesquieu
47187	47120	Monteton
47176	47230	Montgaillard-en-Albret
47188	47800	Montignac-de-Lauzun
47189	47350	Montignac-Toupinerie
47190	47360	Montpezat
47191	47200	Montpouillan
47192	47290	Monviel
47193	47290	Moulinet
47194	47800	Moustier
47195	47600	Nérac
47196	47190	Nicole
47197	47600	Nomdieu
47198	47440	Pailloles
47199	47120	Pardaillan
47200	47210	Parranquet
47201	47520	Le Passage
47202	47150	Paulhiac
47203	47140	Penne-d'Agenais
47204	47350	Peyrière
47205	47700	Pindères
47206	47380	Pinel-Hauterive
47207	47230	Pompiey
47208	47420	Pompogne
47209	47480	Pont-du-Casse
47210	47130	Port-Sainte-Marie
47211	47170	Poudenas
47212	47700	Poussignac
47213	47360	Prayssas
47214	47160	Puch-d'Agenais
47215	47300	Pujols
47216	47350	Puymiclan
47217	47270	Puymirol
47218	47800	Puysserampion
47219	47210	Rayet
47220	47160	Razimet
47221	47170	Réaup-Lisse
47222	47700	La Réunion
47223	47210	Rives
47224	47250	Romestaing
47225	47310	Roquefort
47226	47800	Roumagne
47227	47700	Ruffiac
47228	47340	Saint-Antoine-de-Ficalba
47229	47120	Saint-Astier
47230	47150	Saint-Aubin
47231	47350	Saint-Avit
47232	47350	Saint-Barthélemy-d'Agenais
47234	47270	Saint-Caprais-de-Lerm
47235	47410	Saint-Colomb-de-Lauzun
47233	47180	Sainte-Bazeille
47236	47120	Sainte-Colombe-de-Duras
47237	47300	Sainte-Colombe-de-Villeneuve
47238	47310	Sainte-Colombe-en-Bruilhois
47244	47250	Sainte-Gemme-Martaillac
47252	47110	Sainte-Livrade-sur-Lot
47253	47430	Sainte-Marthe
47258	47170	Sainte-Maure-de-Peyriac
47239	47380	Saint-Étienne-de-Fougères
47240	47210	Saint-Étienne-de-Villeréal
47241	47210	Saint-Eutrope-de-Born
47242	47500	Saint-Front-sur-Lémance
47328	47370	Saint-Georges
47245	47120	Saint-Géraud
47246	47450	Saint-Hilaire-de-Lusignan
47247	47120	Saint-Jean-de-Duras
47248	47270	Saint-Jean-de-Thurac
47249	47130	Saint-Laurent
47250	47160	Saint-Léger
47251	47160	Saint-Léon
47254	47700	Saint-Martin-Curton
47255	47270	Saint-Martin-de-Beauville
47256	47210	Saint-Martin-de-Villeréal
47257	47180	Saint-Martin-Petit
47259	47290	Saint-Maurice-de-Lestapel
47260	47270	Saint-Maurin
47262	47220	Saint-Nicolas-de-la-Balerme
47263	47200	Saint-Pardoux-du-Breuil
47264	47800	Saint-Pardoux-Isaac
47265	47290	Saint-Pastour
47266	47170	Saint-Pé-Saint-Simon
47267	47160	Saint-Pierre-de-Buzet
47269	47270	Saint-Pierre-de-Clairac
47271	47120	Saint-Pierre-sur-Dropt
47272	47330	Saint-Quentin-du-Dropt
47273	47340	Saint-Robert
47274	47270	Saint-Romain-le-Noble
47275	47360	Saint-Salvy
47276	47360	Saint-Sardos
47277	47180	Saint-Sauveur-de-Meilhan
47278	47120	Saint-Sernin
47279	47220	Saint-Sixte
47280	47140	Saint-Sylvestre-sur-Lot
47281	47270	Saint-Urcisse
47282	47310	Saint-Vincent-de-Lamontjoie
47283	47500	Saint-Vite
47284	47150	Salles
47285	47250	Samazan
47286	47420	Sauméjan
47287	47600	Saumont
47288	47340	Sauvagnas
47289	47270	La Sauvetat-de-Savères
47290	47800	La Sauvetat-du-Dropt
47291	47150	La Sauvetat-sur-Lède
47292	47500	Sauveterre-la-Lémance
47293	47220	Sauveterre-Saint-Denis
47294	47120	Savignac-de-Duras
47295	47150	Savignac-sur-Leyze
47296	47410	Ségalas
47297	47360	Sembas
47298	47430	Sénestis
47299	47410	Sérignac-Péboudou
47300	47310	Sérignac-sur-Garonne
47301	47350	Seyches
47302	47170	Sos
47303	47120	Soumensac
47304	47200	Taillebourg
47305	47270	Tayrac
47306	47110	Le Temple-sur-Lot
47307	47370	Thézac
47308	47230	Thouars-sur-Garonne
47309	47380	Tombebœuf
47310	47400	Tonneins
47311	47210	Tourliac
47312	47370	Tournon-d'Agenais
47313	47380	Tourtrès
47314	47140	Trémons
47315	47140	Trentels
47316	47400	Varès
47317	47260	Verteuil-d'Agenais
47318	47230	Vianne
47319	47380	Villebramar
47320	47160	Villefranche-du-Queyran
47321	47120	Villeneuve-de-Duras
47323	47300	Villeneuve-sur-Lot
47324	47210	Villeréal
47325	47400	Villeton
47326	47200	Virazeil
47327	47230	Xaintrailles
