= Boudy-de-Beauregard =

- Commune
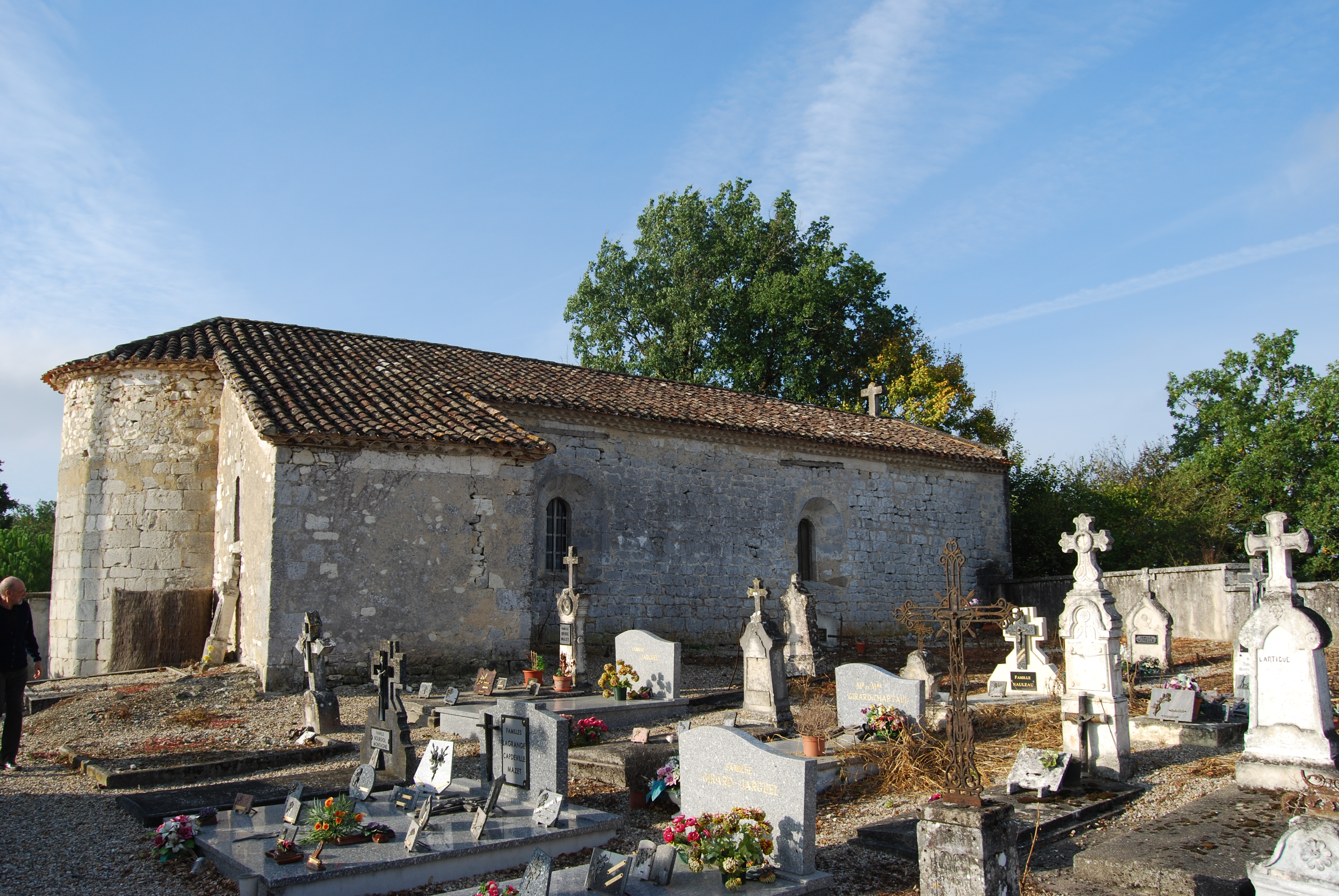
- The church in Boudy-de-Beauregard
- Location of Boudy-de-Beauregard
- Location within France Location within Nouvelle-Aquitaine
- Coordinates: 44°32′22″N 0°41′24″E
- Country: France
- Region: Nouvelle-Aquitaine
- Department: Lot-et-Garonne
- Arrondissement: Villeneuve-sur-Lot
- Canton: Le Haut agenais Périgord

Government
  - Mayor (2020–2026): Isabelle Andrac
- Area^{1}: 10.07 km^{2} (3.89 sq mi)
- Highest elevation: 156 m (512 ft)
- Lowest elevation: 82 m (269 ft)
- Population (2023): 392
  - Density: 38.9/km^{2} (101/sq mi)
- Time zone: UTC+01:00 (CET)
  - Summer (DST): UTC+02:00 (CEST)
- INSEE/Postal code: 47033 /47290
- ^{1} French Land Register data, which excludes lakes, ponds, glaciers > 1 km^{2} (0.386 sq mi or 247 acres) and river estuaries.

Boudy-de-Beauregard (French pronunciation: [budi də boʁɡaʁ]; Occitan: Bodin de Bòrregard) is a commune in the Lot-et-Garonne department in southwestern France.

== Population ==
Historical population
Year	Pop.	±% p.a.
1968	215	—
1975	226	+0.72%
1982	237	+0.68%
1990	314	+3.58%
1999	356	+1.40%
2007	395	+1.31%
2012	414	+0.94%
2017	414	+0.00%
2023	392	−0.91%
Source: INSEE

== See also ==
- Communes of the Lot-et-Garonne department
