= Saint-Maurice-de-Lestapel =

- Commune
- Coat of arms
- Location of Saint-Maurice-de-Lestapel
- Location within France Location within Nouvelle-Aquitaine
- Coordinates: 44°34′29″N 0°34′09″E
- Country: France
- Region: Nouvelle-Aquitaine
- Department: Lot-et-Garonne
- Arrondissement: Villeneuve-sur-Lot
- Canton: Le Haut agenais Périgord

Government
  - Mayor (2020–2026): Marie-Christine Biche
- Area^{1}: 7.79 km^{2} (3.01 sq mi)
- Highest elevation: 170 m (560 ft)
- Lowest elevation: 84 m (276 ft)
- Population (2023): 110
  - Density: 14/km^{2} (37/sq mi)
- Time zone: UTC+01:00 (CET)
  - Summer (DST): UTC+02:00 (CEST)
- INSEE/Postal code: 47259 /47290
- ^{1} French Land Register data, which excludes lakes, ponds, glaciers > 1 km^{2} (0.386 sq mi or 247 acres) and river estuaries.

Saint-Maurice-de-Lestapel (French: [sɛ̃ mɔʁis də lɛstapɛl]; Occitan: Sent Maurici de Lestapèl) is a commune in the Lot-et-Garonne department in south-western France.

== See also ==
- Communes of the Lot-et-Garonne department
