= Laussou =

- Commune
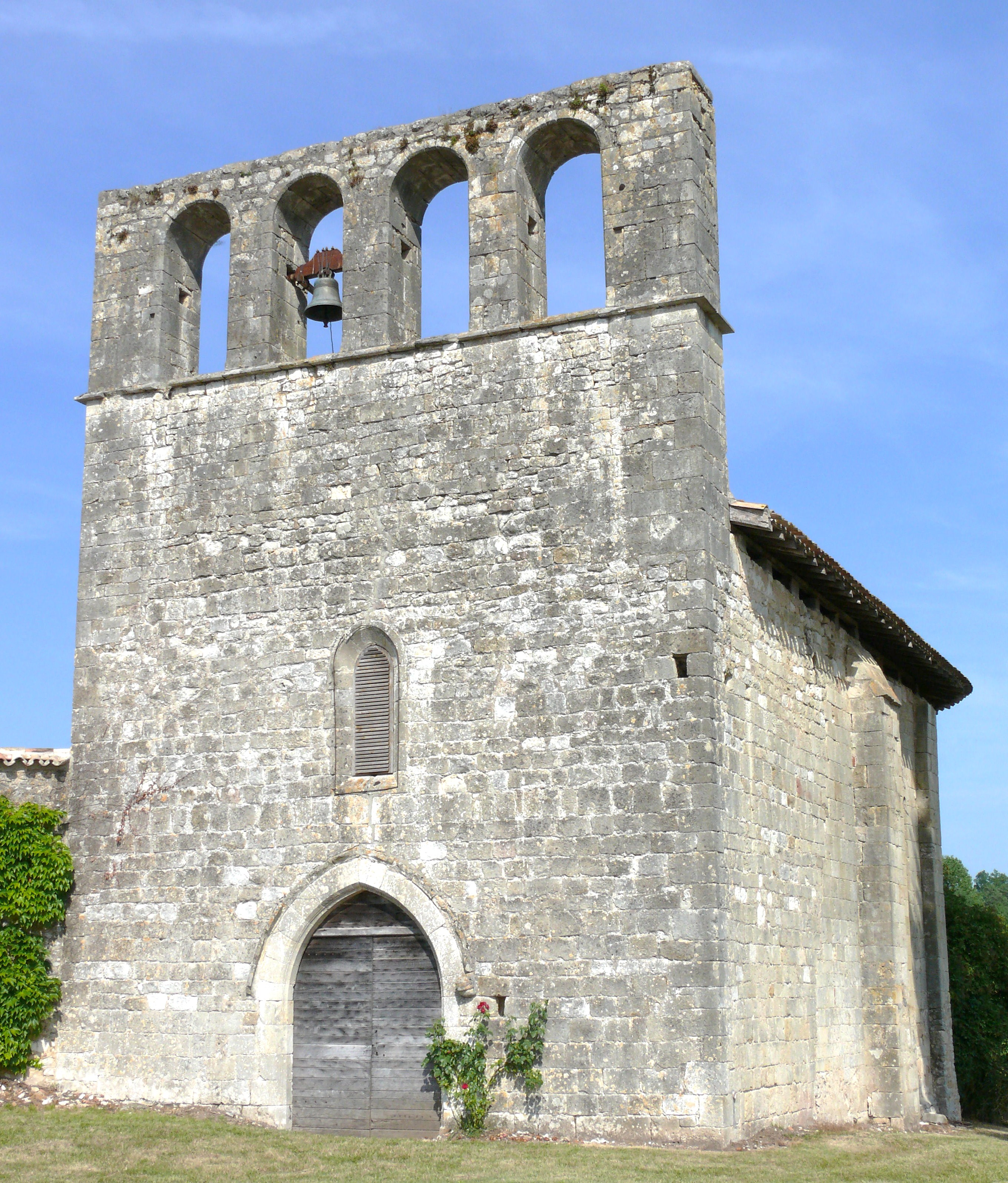
- The church in Laussou
- Location of Laussou
- Location within France Location within Nouvelle-Aquitaine
- Coordinates: 44°34′52″N 0°47′04″E
- Country: France
- Region: Nouvelle-Aquitaine
- Department: Lot-et-Garonne
- Arrondissement: Villeneuve-sur-Lot
- Canton: Le Haut agenais Périgord
- Intercommunality: Bastides en Haut-Agenais Périgord

Government
  - Mayor (2020–2026): Max Lemarchand
- Area^{1}: 17.15 km^{2} (6.62 sq mi)
- Elevation: 130 m (430 ft)
- Highest elevation: 200 m (660 ft)
- Lowest elevation: 75 m (246 ft)
- Population (2023): 284
  - Density: 16.6/km^{2} (42.9/sq mi)
- Time zone: UTC+01:00 (CET)
  - Summer (DST): UTC+02:00 (CEST)
- INSEE/Postal code: 47141 /47150
- ^{1} French Land Register data, which excludes lakes, ponds, glaciers > 1 km^{2} (0.386 sq mi or 247 acres) and river estuaries.

Laussou (French pronunciation: [losu]; Occitan: Lo Laussó) is a commune in the Lot-et-Garonne department in south-western France.

== See also ==
- Communes of the Lot-et-Garonne department
