= Moulinet, Lot-et-Garonne =

Moulinet
- Commune
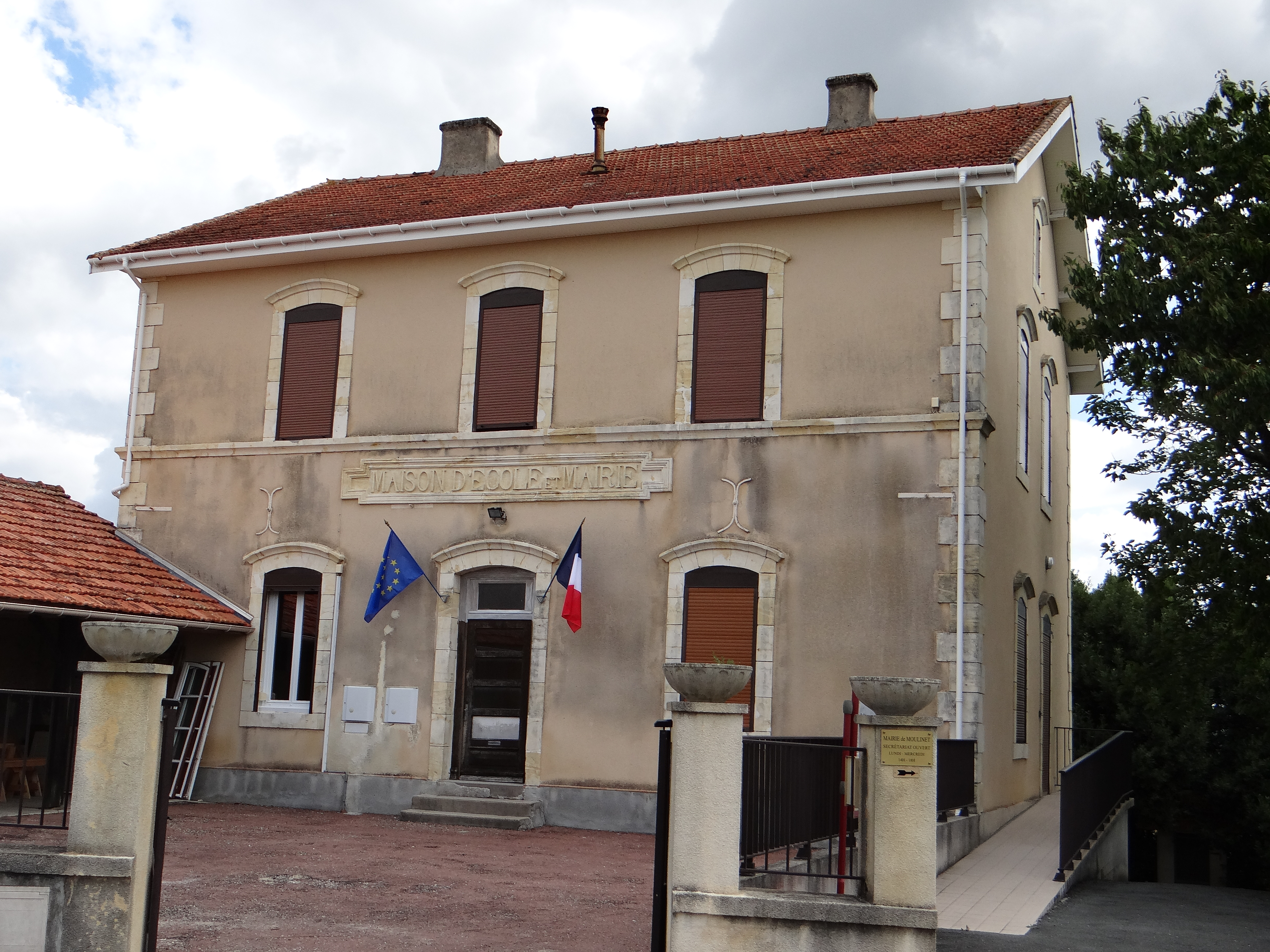
- The town hall in Moulinet
- Location of Moulinet
- Location within France Location within Nouvelle-Aquitaine
- Coordinates: 44°32′33″N 0°34′58″E
- Country: France
- Region: Nouvelle-Aquitaine
- Department: Lot-et-Garonne
- Arrondissement: Villeneuve-sur-Lot
- Canton: Le Haut agenais Périgord
- Intercommunality: Bastides en Haut-Agenais Périgord

Government
  - Mayor (2020–2026): Georges-Robert Piniello
- Area^{1}: 14.57 km^{2} (5.63 sq mi)
- Elevation: 137 m (449 ft)
- Highest elevation: 170 m (560 ft)
- Lowest elevation: 83 m (272 ft)
- Population (2023): 195
  - Density: 13.4/km^{2} (34.7/sq mi)
- Time zone: UTC+01:00 (CET)
  - Summer (DST): UTC+02:00 (CEST)
- INSEE/Postal code: 47193 /47290
- ^{1} French Land Register data, which excludes lakes, ponds, glaciers > 1 km^{2} (0.386 sq mi or 247 acres) and river estuaries.

Moulinet (French pronunciation: [mulinɛ]; Occitan: Molinet) is a commune in the Lot-et-Garonne département in southwestern France.

== Twin towns ==
- Moulinet is twinned with another Moulinet, in the French département of Alpes-Maritimes.

== See also ==
- Communes of the Lot-et-Garonne department
