= Parranquet =

- Commune
- Location of Parranquet
- Location within France Location within Nouvelle-Aquitaine
- Coordinates: 44°39′29″N 0°48′51″E
- Country: France
- Region: Nouvelle-Aquitaine
- Department: Lot-et-Garonne
- Arrondissement: Villeneuve-sur-Lot
- Canton: Le Haut agenais Périgord

Government
  - Mayor (2020–2026): Alain Gouyou
- Area^{1}: 9.62 km^{2} (3.71 sq mi)
- Elevation: 100 m (330 ft)
- Highest elevation: 210 m (690 ft)
- Lowest elevation: 96 m (315 ft)
- Population (2023): 113
  - Density: 11.7/km^{2} (30.4/sq mi)
- Time zone: UTC+01:00 (CET)
  - Summer (DST): UTC+02:00 (CEST)
- INSEE/Postal code: 47200 /47210
- ^{1} French Land Register data, which excludes lakes, ponds, glaciers > 1 km^{2} (0.386 sq mi or 247 acres) and river estuaries.

Parranquet (French pronunciation: [paʁɑ̃kɛ]; Occitan: Parrancuèch) is a commune in the Lot-et-Garonne department in south-western France.

== See also ==
- Communes of the Lot-et-Garonne department
