= Villeréal =

- Commune
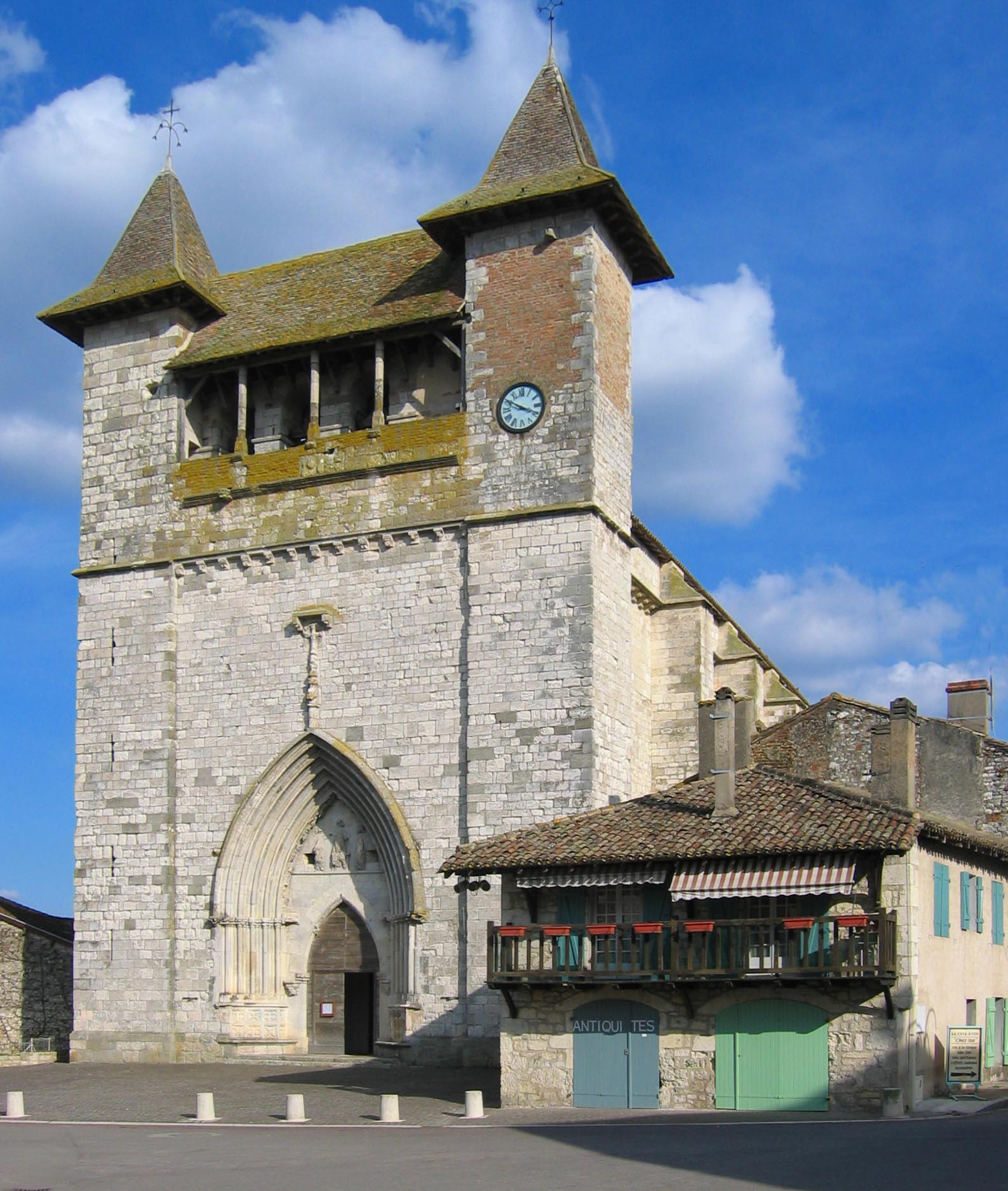
- The church in Villeréal

- Coat of arms
- Location of Villeréal
- Location within France Location within Nouvelle-Aquitaine
- Coordinates: 44°38′15″N 0°44′38″E
- Country: France
- Region: Nouvelle-Aquitaine
- Department: Lot-et-Garonne
- Arrondissement: Villeneuve-sur-Lot
- Canton: Le Haut agenais Périgord
- Intercommunality: Bastides en Haut-Agenais Périgord

Government
  - Mayor (2023–2026): Jean-Jacques Caminade
- Area^{1}: 13.92 km^{2} (5.37 sq mi)
- Elevation: 120 m (390 ft)
- Highest elevation: 168 m (551 ft)
- Lowest elevation: 78 m (256 ft)
- Population (2023): 1,261
  - Density: 90.59/km^{2} (234.6/sq mi)
- Time zone: UTC+01:00 (CET)
  - Summer (DST): UTC+02:00 (CEST)
- INSEE/Postal code: 47324 /47210
- ^{1} French Land Register data, which excludes lakes, ponds, glaciers > 1 km^{2} (0.386 sq mi or 247 acres) and river estuaries.

Villeréal (French pronunciation: [vilʁeal]; Languedocien: Vilareal) is a commune in the Lot-et-Garonne department in south-western France. It is a member of Les Plus Beaux Villages de France (The Most Beautiful Villages of France) Association.

== History ==
In 1265, Gaston de Gontaut-Biron gave part of the Montlabour forest to the Count Alphonse de Poitiers, brother of the King Louis IX of France and Count of Toulouse. The new Bastide was built in the next four years and the King signed a contract in 1269 determining the legal statutes of the Villereal. In addition, Villereal was occupied by the English from 1279 to 1453. King Edward I of England signed the “Charte des Coutumes de la Cité” on 20 April 1288, which protected the inhabitants and set the rules of life in the village community. Due to this charter Saturday was fixed as the market day.

== Construction ==
The construction of Villéreal followed the basic grid plan of Bastides. There are eight main streets, set at right angles, around the large central square. The “Halle”, the main market building, is spacious and has an unusual half-timber and cob upper storey. Villéreal is a great example for those who believe arcades were not part of the original design. The exterior stairs lead to upper levels of marketplace buildings. Villéreal's exterior stairways would be necessary only if arcades were added to an existing building, since they provided access to the rooms above the street.

== Photograph Collection ==
The John Reps Collection contains 49 photographs of the village, dated 1966-2010.

== See also ==
- Communes of the Lot-et-Garonne department
