= Lède =

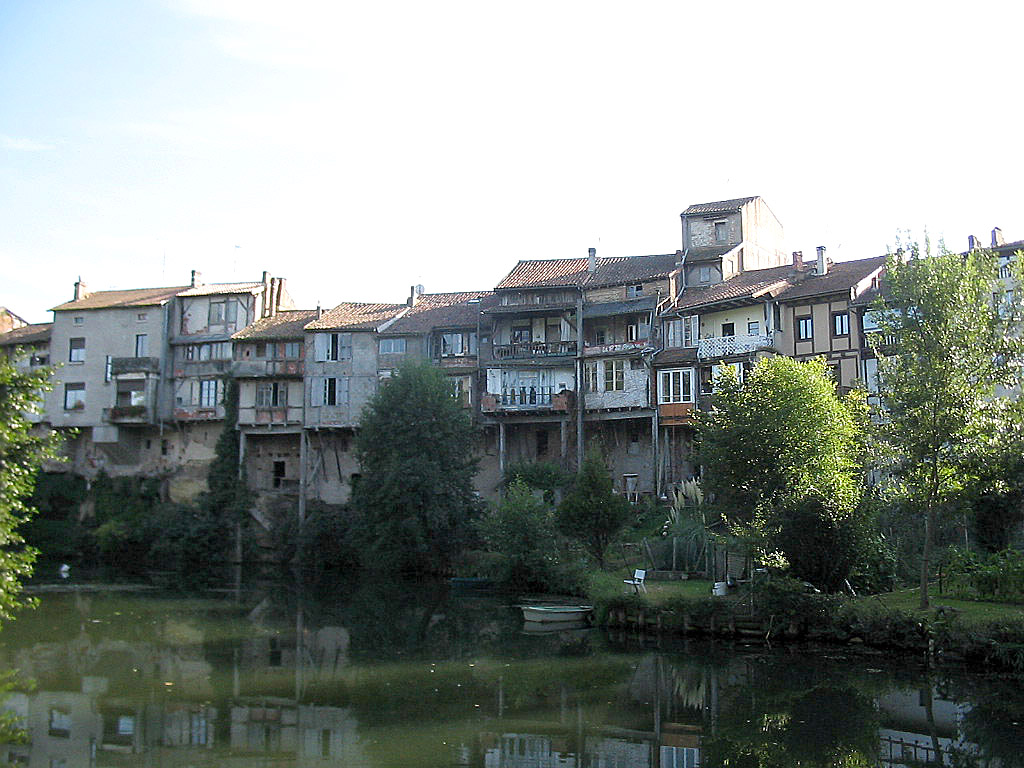

- Location within France Location within Nouvelle-Aquitaine

Location
- Country: France

Physical characteristics
- Mouth
  - location: Lot
  - coordinates: 44°26′38″N 0°37′5″E
- Length: 54 km (34 mi)

Basin features
- Progression: Lot→ Garonne→ Gironde estuary→ Atlantic Ocean

The Lède (French pronunciation: [lɛd]) is a 54-kilometre (34 mi) long river in the Lot-et-Garonne département, south-western France, right tributary of the Lot. Its source is near Lacapelle-Biron. It flows generally southwest through the town Monflanquin and flows into the Lot in Casseneuil.
