= Romestaing =

- Commune
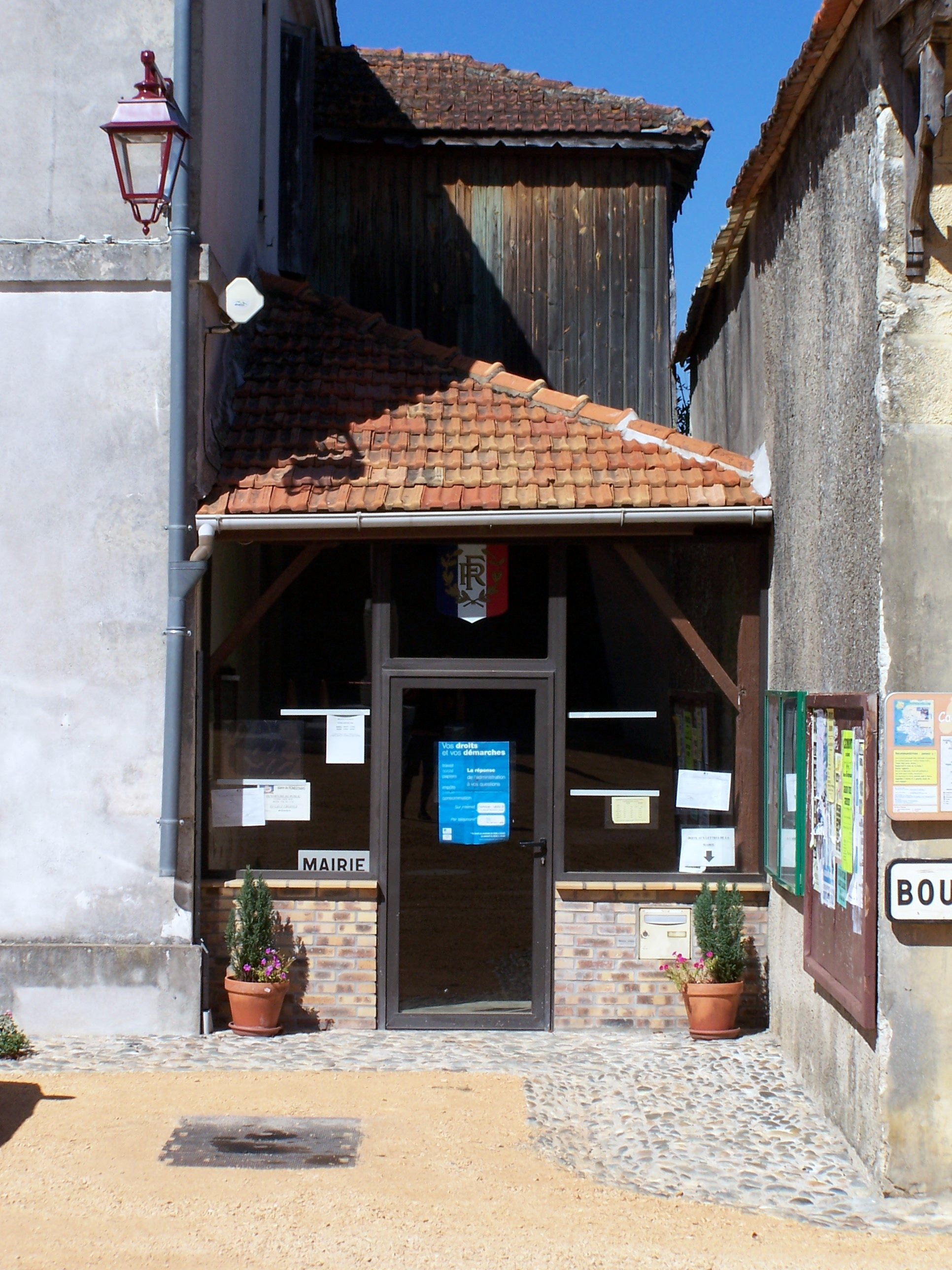
- The town hall in Romestaing
- Location of Romestaing
- Location within France Location within Nouvelle-Aquitaine
- Coordinates: 44°25′05″N 0°00′14″E
- Country: France
- Region: Nouvelle-Aquitaine
- Department: Lot-et-Garonne
- Arrondissement: Marmande
- Canton: Les Forêts de Gascogne
- Intercommunality: Coteaux et Landes de Gascogne

Government
  - Mayor (2020–2026): Pierre Grange
- Area^{1}: 15.46 km^{2} (5.97 sq mi)
- Elevation: 183 m (600 ft)
- Highest elevation: 167 m (548 ft)
- Lowest elevation: 56 m (184 ft)
- Population (2023): 163
  - Density: 10.5/km^{2} (27.3/sq mi)
- Time zone: UTC+01:00 (CET)
  - Summer (DST): UTC+02:00 (CEST)
- INSEE/Postal code: 47224 /47250
- ^{1} French Land Register data, which excludes lakes, ponds, glaciers > 1 km^{2} (0.386 sq mi or 247 acres) and river estuaries.

Romestaing (French pronunciation: [ʁɔmɛstɛ̃]; Occitan: Romestanh) is a commune in the Lot-et-Garonne département in south-western France.

Its inhabitants are called Romestaingais (male) or Romestaingaises (female), as French is a gendered language, no non-gendered name exists for them.

== Toponymy ==
The name of the commune comes from the Latin Romana Sattio, an important junction of Roman roads. A second hypothesis suggests that the name Romestaing is derived from the surname Hromstang. The commune has been known under its present name, which appeared in the Regista Clementis P.P.V. in 1312, since the Middle Ages.

In Gascon, the commune is known as Romestanh.

== Twinning ==
Romestaing is twinned with Obersaasheim, a village in the French département of Haut-Rhin, Alsace. At the start of the Second World War, the inhabitants of Obersaasheim were evacuated to Lot-et-Garonne, to the communes of Guérin and Romestaing, until autumn 1940 when they were ordered by the occupying Germans to return to their villages.

== Sites and monuments ==
- Église Saint-Christophe (Saint Christopher's church), built in the 12th century, is the sole remnant of a Knights Templar commandery. It has been listed since 1965 as a monument historique by the French Ministry of Culture. In the old charters of the commandery, it is recorded that Amanieu de Coutera and his grandsons, Forton et Bernard, ceded their land at Romestang to the Templar's commander of Cours.
- Château Bonneau

== See also ==
- Communes of the Lot-et-Garonne department
