= Ruffiac =

Ruffiac is the name of several communes in France:

- Ruffiac, in the Lot-et-Garonne department
- Ruffiac, in the Morbihan department

== Other uses ==
- Ruffiac (grape), another name for the French wine grape Arrufiac
