= Anzex =

- Commune
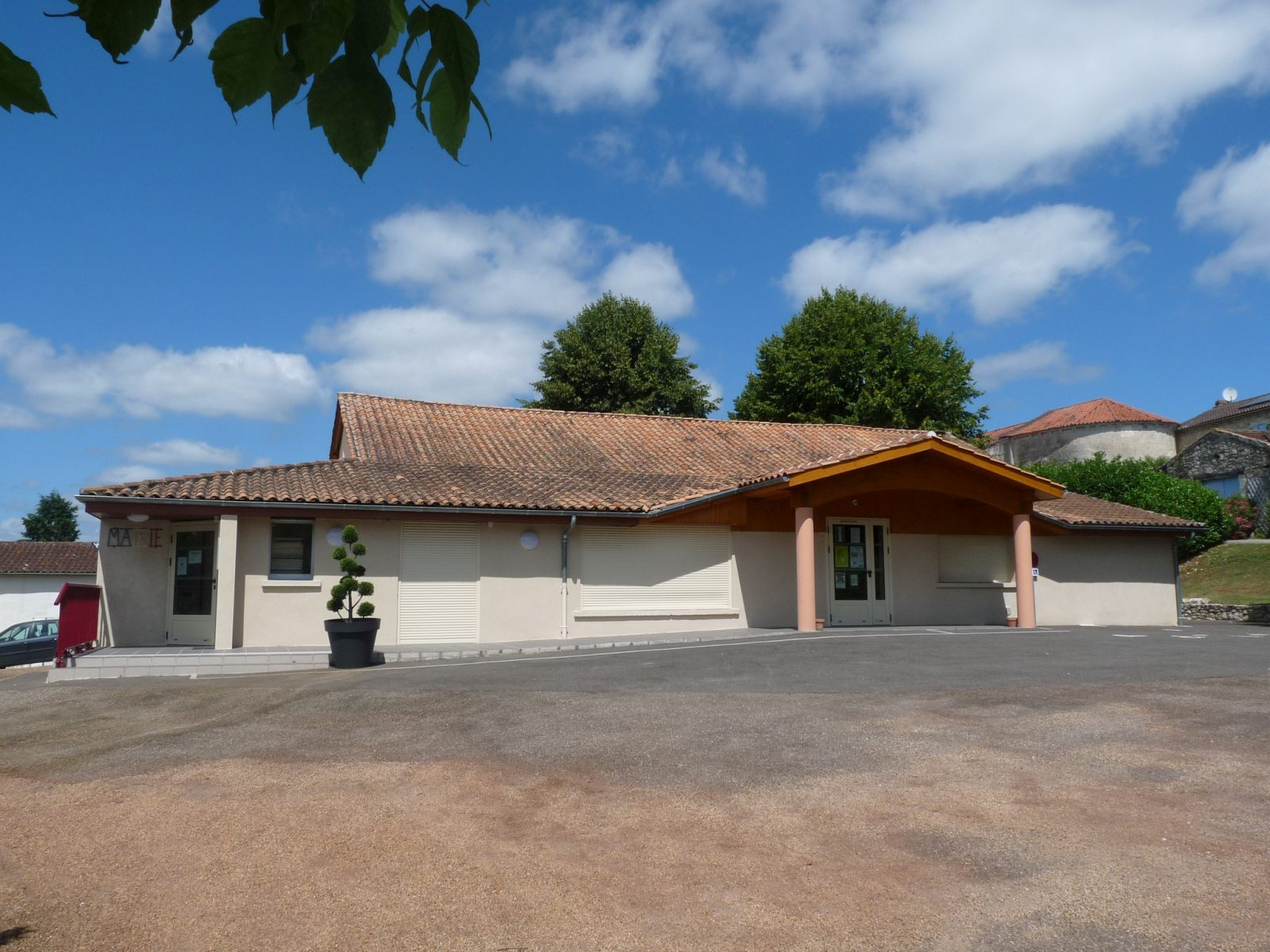
- Anzex Town hall
- Location of Anzex
- Location within France Location within Nouvelle-Aquitaine
- Coordinates: 44°17′06″N 0°09′58″E
- Country: France
- Region: Nouvelle-Aquitaine
- Department: Lot-et-Garonne
- Arrondissement: Nérac
- Canton: Les Forêts de Gascogne
- Intercommunality: Coteaux et Landes de Gascogne

Government
  - Mayor (2020–2026): Josiane Chopis
- Area^{1}: 23.24 km^{2} (8.97 sq mi)
- Elevation: 70 m (230 ft)
- Highest elevation: 172 m (564 ft)
- Lowest elevation: 58 m (190 ft)
- Population (2023): 332
  - Density: 14.3/km^{2} (37.0/sq mi)
- Time zone: UTC+01:00 (CET)
  - Summer (DST): UTC+02:00 (CEST)
- INSEE/Postal code: 47012 /47700
- ^{1} French Land Register data, which excludes lakes, ponds, glaciers > 1 km^{2} (0.386 sq mi or 247 acres) and river estuaries.

Anzex is a commune in the Lot-et-Garonne department in southwestern France.

== Population ==
Historical population
Year	Pop.	±% p.a.
1968	247	—
1975	193	−3.46%
1982	216	+1.62%
1990	266	+2.64%
1999	255	−0.47%
2007	259	+0.19%
2012	296	+2.71%
2017	313	+1.12%
2023	332	+0.99%
Source: INSEE

== See also ==
- Communes of the Lot-et-Garonne department
