= Le Mas-d'Agenais =

- Commune
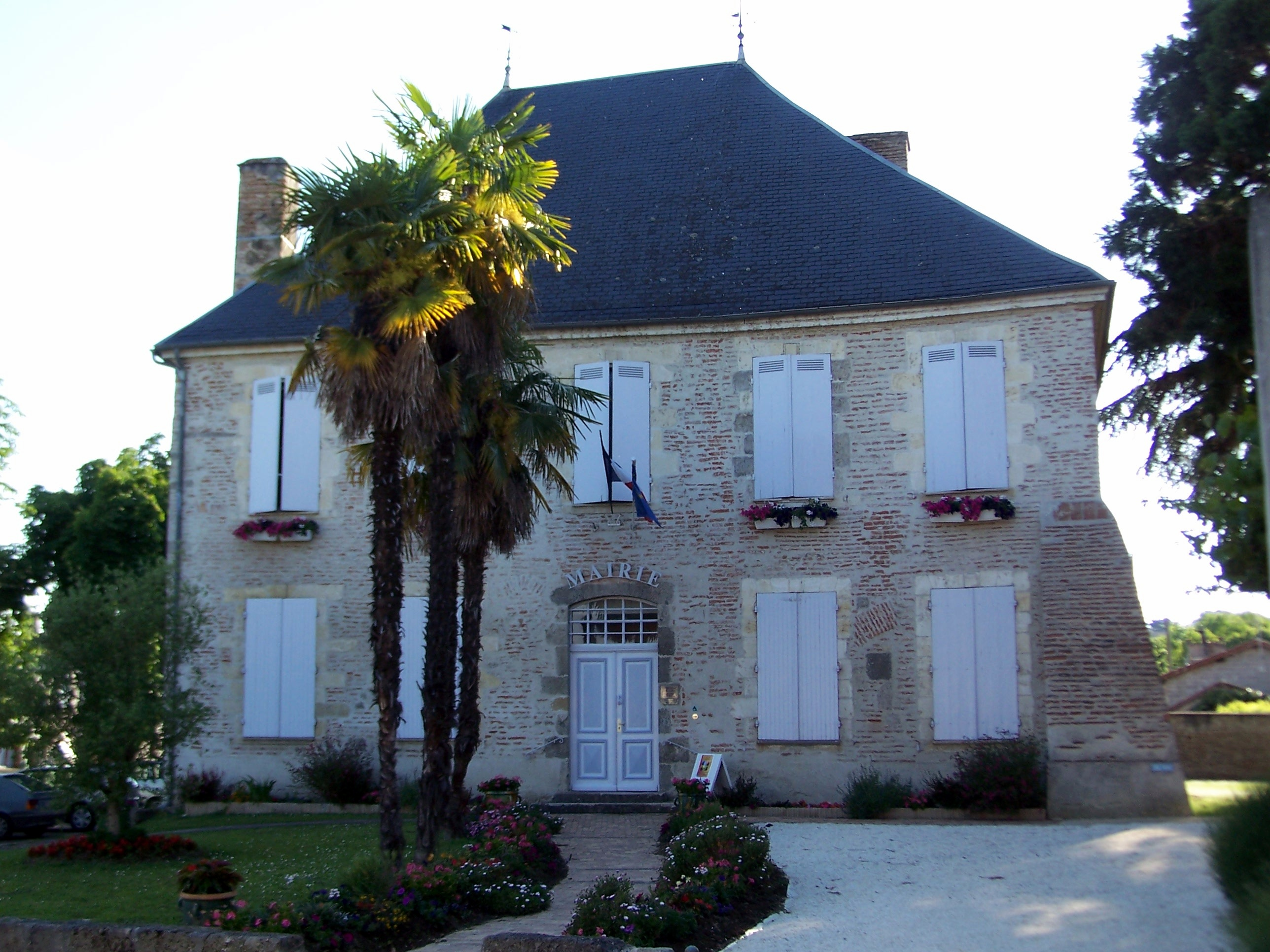
- The town hall in Le Mas-d'Agenais

- Coat of arms
- Location of Le Mas-d'Agenais
- Location within France Location within Nouvelle-Aquitaine
- Coordinates: 44°24′42″N 0°13′05″E
- Country: France
- Region: Nouvelle-Aquitaine
- Department: Lot-et-Garonne
- Arrondissement: Marmande
- Canton: Les Forêts de Gascogne
- Intercommunality: Val de Garonne Agglomération

Government
  - Mayor (2020–2026): Claude Lagarde
- Area^{1}: 21.18 km^{2} (8.18 sq mi)
- Elevation: 45 m (148 ft)
- Highest elevation: 120 m (390 ft)
- Lowest elevation: 17 m (56 ft)
- Population (2023): 1,456
  - Density: 68.74/km^{2} (178.0/sq mi)
- Demonym(s): Massais, Massaises
- Time zone: UTC+01:00 (CET)
  - Summer (DST): UTC+02:00 (CEST)
- INSEE/Postal code: 47159 /47430
- ^{1} French Land Register data, which excludes lakes, ponds, glaciers > 1 km^{2} (0.386 sq mi or 247 acres) and river estuaries.

Le Mas-d'Agenais (French pronunciation: [lə mas daʒ(ə)nɛ], literally Le Mas of Agenais; Occitan: Lo Mas d'Agenés) is a commune in the Lot-et-Garonne department in south-western France.

== See also ==
- Communes of the Lot-et-Garonne department
