= Poussignac =

- Commune
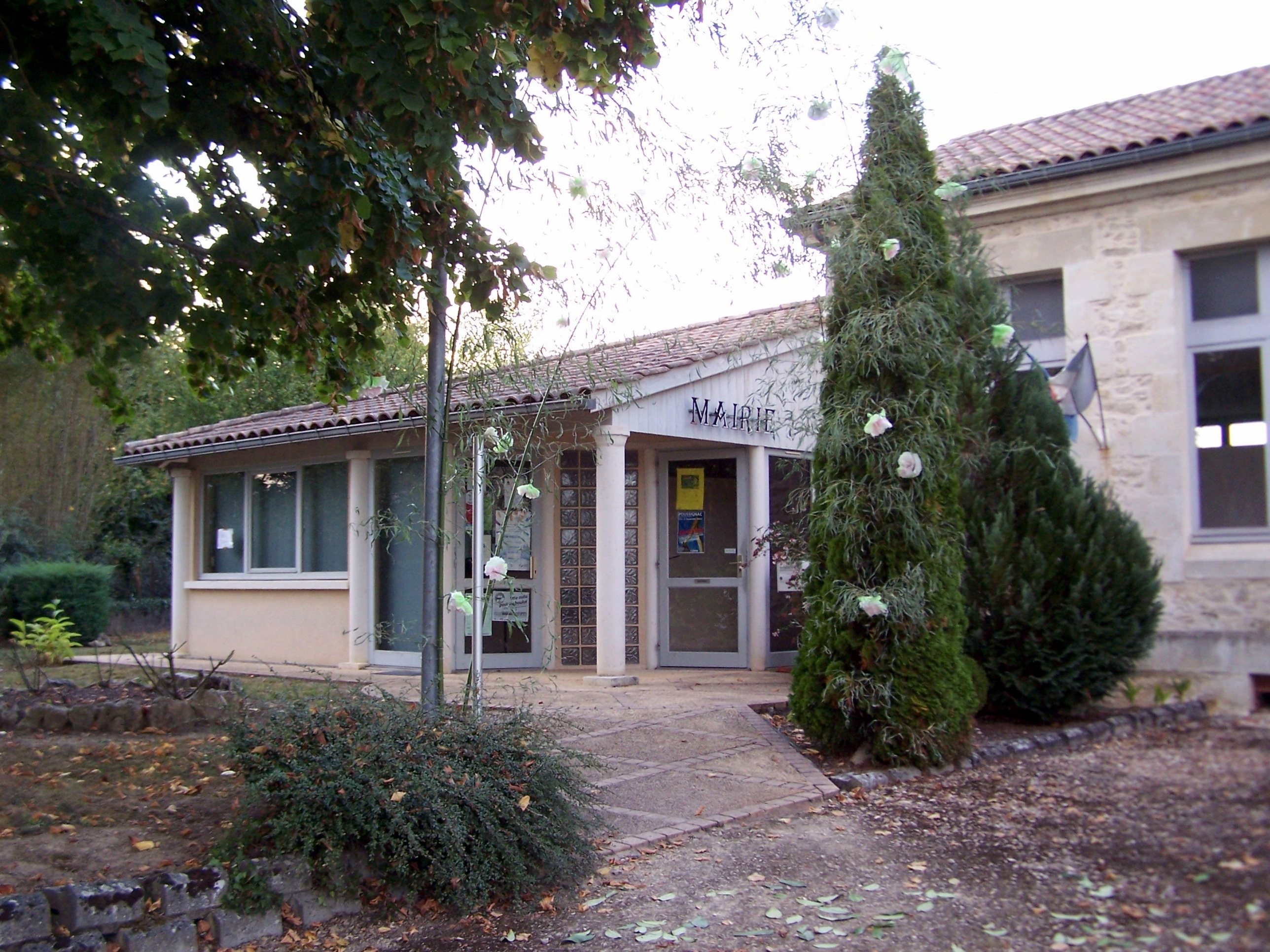
- The town hall in Poussignac
- Location of Poussignac
- Location within France Location within Nouvelle-Aquitaine
- Coordinates: 44°21′28″N 0°04′17″E
- Country: France
- Region: Nouvelle-Aquitaine
- Department: Lot-et-Garonne
- Arrondissement: Marmande
- Canton: Les Forêts de Gascogne
- Intercommunality: CC Coteaux et Landes de Gascogne

Government
  - Mayor (2020–2026): Florian Patacconi-Silvestrini
- Area^{1}: 13.02 km^{2} (5.03 sq mi)
- Elevation: 37 m (121 ft)
- Highest elevation: 151 m (495 ft)
- Lowest elevation: 51 m (167 ft)
- Population (2023): 309
  - Density: 23.7/km^{2} (61.5/sq mi)
- Time zone: UTC+01:00 (CET)
  - Summer (DST): UTC+02:00 (CEST)
- INSEE/Postal code: 47212 /47700
- ^{1} French Land Register data, which excludes lakes, ponds, glaciers > 1 km^{2} (0.386 sq mi or 247 acres) and river estuaries.

Poussignac (French pronunciation: [pusiɲak]; Occitan: Pocinhac) is a commune in the Lot-et-Garonne department in south-western France.

== See also ==
- Communes of the Lot-et-Garonne department
