= Argenton, Lot-et-Garonne =

Argenton
- Commune
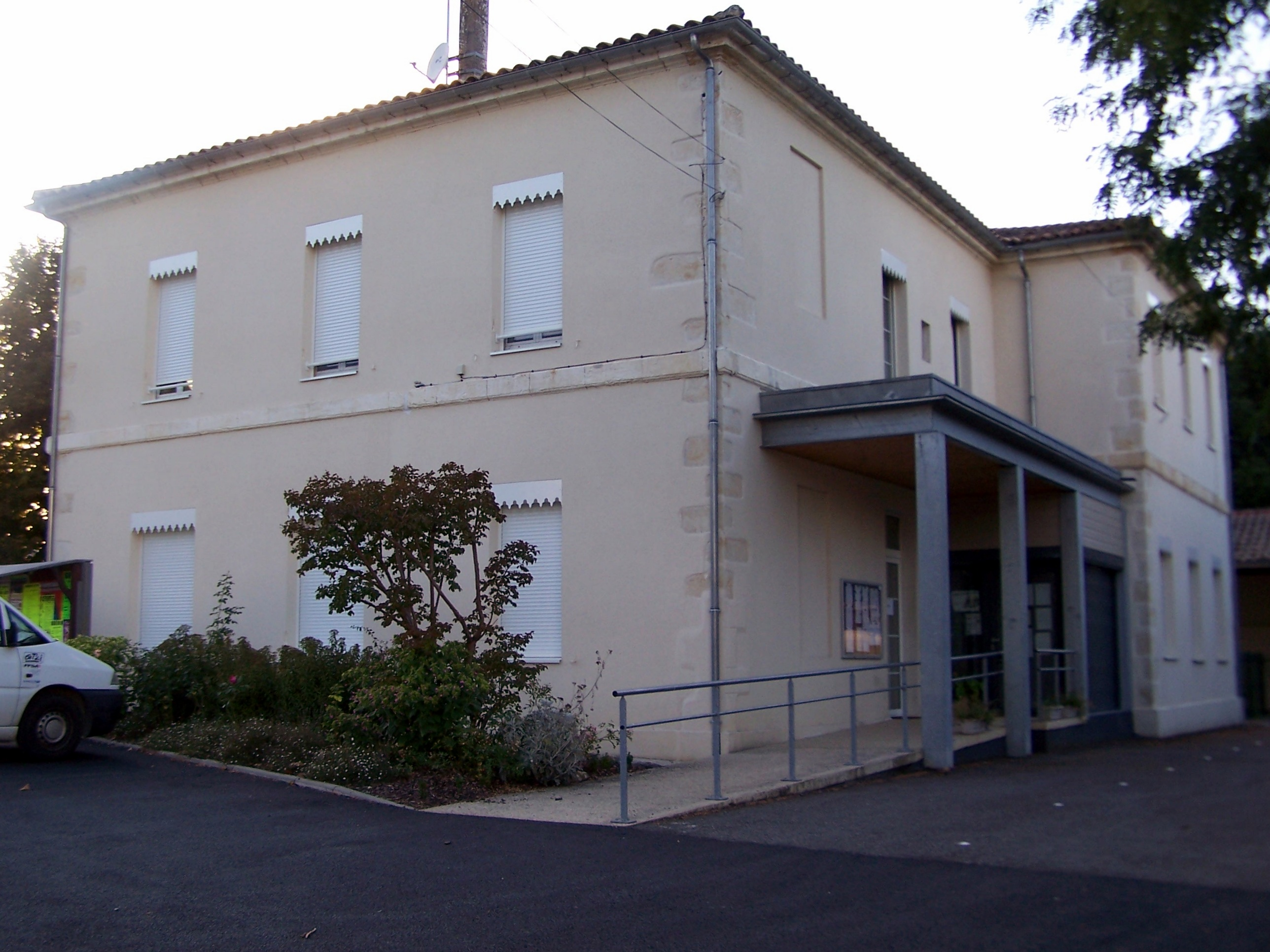
- The town hall and school in Argenton
- Location of Argenton
- Location within France Location within Nouvelle-Aquitaine
- Coordinates: 44°23′09″N 0°05′41″E
- Country: France
- Region: Nouvelle-Aquitaine
- Department: Lot-et-Garonne
- Arrondissement: Marmande
- Canton: Les Forêts de Gascogne
- Intercommunality: CC Coteaux Landes Gascogne

Government
  - Mayor (2020–2026): Raymond Girardi
- Area^{1}: 12.14 km^{2} (4.69 sq mi)
- Elevation: 52 m (171 ft)
- Highest elevation: 169 m (554 ft)
- Lowest elevation: 45 m (148 ft)
- Population (2023): 331
  - Density: 27.3/km^{2} (70.6/sq mi)
- Time zone: UTC+01:00 (CET)
  - Summer (DST): UTC+02:00 (CEST)
- INSEE/Postal code: 47013 /47250
- ^{1} French Land Register data, which excludes lakes, ponds, glaciers > 1 km^{2} (0.386 sq mi or 247 acres) and river estuaries.

Argenton (French pronunciation: [aʁʒɑ̃tɔ̃]; Occitan: Argenton) is a commune in the Lot-et-Garonne department in southwestern France.

== Population ==
Historical population
Year	Pop.	±% p.a.
1968	307	—
1975	298	−0.42%
1982	258	−2.04%
1990	269	+0.52%
1999	268	−0.04%
2007	284	+0.73%
2012	339	+3.60%
2017	315	−1.46%
2023	331	+0.83%
Source: INSEE

== See also ==
- Communes of the Lot-et-Garonne department
