= Arrondissement of Marmande =

Coordinates: 44.50°N 0.17°E

Marmande
- Arrondissement
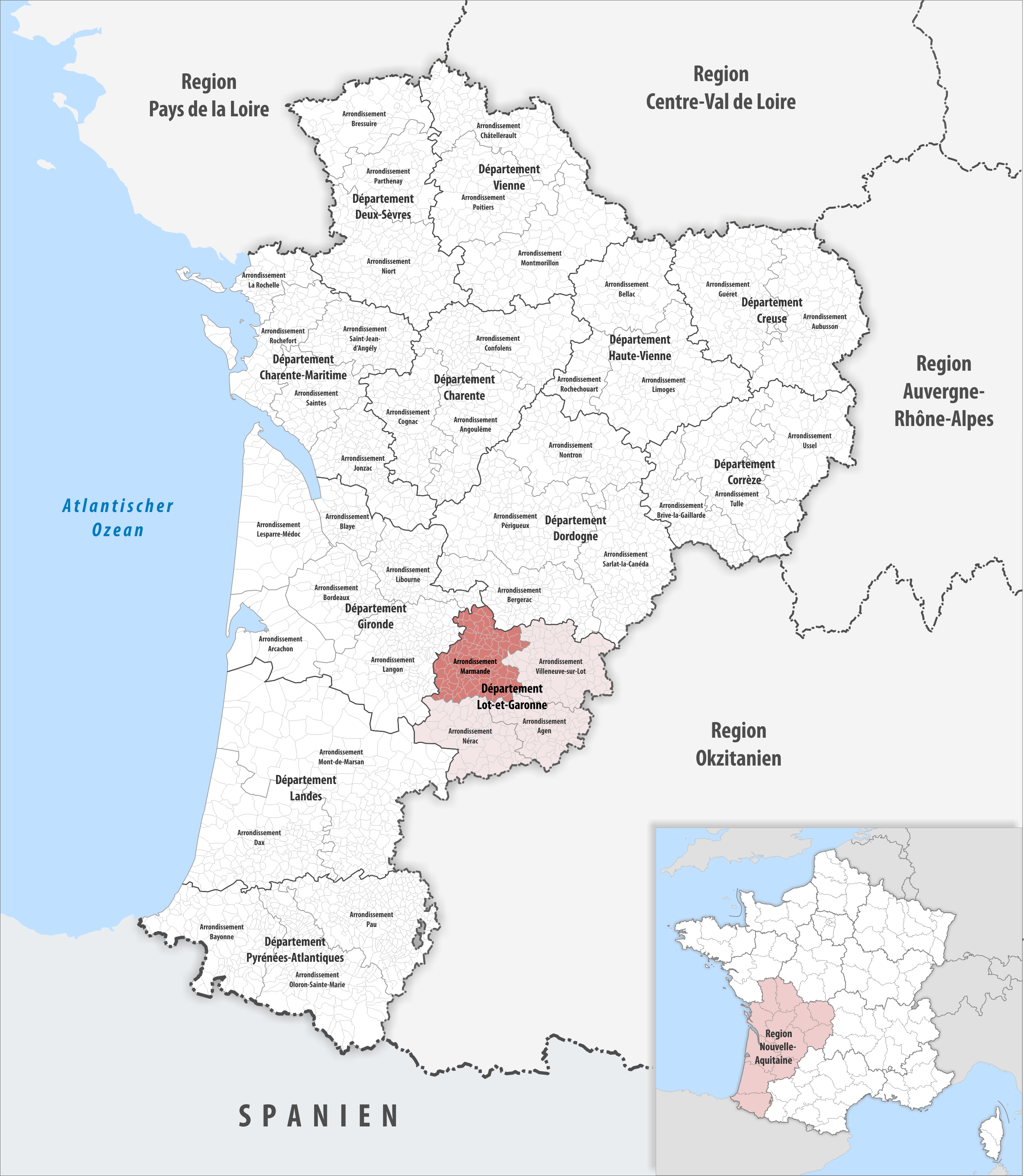
- Location within the region Nouvelle-Aquitaine
- Country: France
- Region: Nouvelle-Aquitaine
- Department: Lot-et-Garonne
- No. of communes: {{{nbcomm}}}
- Area: 1,387.7 km^{2} (535.8 sq mi)
- Population (2023): 84,226
  - Density: 60.695/km^{2} (157.20/sq mi)
- INSEE code: 472

The arrondissement of Marmande is an arrondissement of France in the Lot-et-Garonne department in the Nouvelle-Aquitaine region. It has 98 communes. Its population is 83,657 (2021), and its area is 1,387.7 km^{2} (535.8 sq mi).

== Composition ==
The communes of the arrondissement of Marmande, and their INSEE codes, are:

1. Agmé (47002)
2. Agnac (47003)
3. Allemans-du-Dropt (47005)
4. Antagnac (47010)
5. Argenton (47013)
6. Armillac (47014)
7. Auriac-sur-Dropt (47018)
8. Baleyssagues (47020)
9. Beaupuy (47024)
10. Birac-sur-Trec (47028)
11. Bouglon (47034)
12. Bourgougnague (47035)
13. Brugnac (47042)
14. Calonges (47046)
15. Cambes (47047)
16. Castelmoron-sur-Lot (47054)
17. Castelnau-sur-Gupie (47056)
18. Caubon-Saint-Sauveur (47059)
19. Caumont-sur-Garonne (47061)
20. Clairac (47065)
21. Cocumont (47068)
22. Coulx (47071)
23. Couthures-sur-Garonne (47074)
24. Duras (47086)
25. Escassefort (47088)
26. Esclottes (47089)
27. Fauguerolles (47094)
28. Fauillet (47095)
29. Fourques-sur-Garonne (47101)
30. Gaujac (47108)
31. Gontaud-de-Nogaret (47110)
32. Grateloup-Saint-Gayrand (47112)
33. Grézet-Cavagnan (47114)
34. Guérin (47115)
35. Hautesvignes (47118)
36. Jusix (47120)
37. Labastide-Castel-Amouroux (47121)
38. Labretonie (47122)
39. Lachapelle (47126)
40. Lafitte-sur-Lot (47127)
41. Lagruère (47130)
42. Lagupie (47131)
43. Laparade (47135)
44. Laperche (47136)
45. Lauzun (47142)
46. Lavergne (47144)
47. Lévignac-de-Guyenne (47147)
48. Longueville (47150)
49. Loubès-Bernac (47151)
50. Marcellus (47156)
51. Marmande (47157)
52. Le Mas-d'Agenais (47159)
53. Mauvezin-sur-Gupie (47163)
54. Meilhan-sur-Garonne (47165)
55. Miramont-de-Guyenne (47168)
56. Monteton (47187)
57. Montignac-de-Lauzun (47188)
58. Montignac-Toupinerie (47189)
59. Montpouillan (47191)
60. Moustier (47194)
61. Pardaillan (47199)
62. Peyrière (47204)
63. Poussignac (47212)
64. Puymiclan (47216)
65. Puysserampion (47218)
66. Romestaing (47224)
67. Roumagne (47226)
68. Ruffiac (47227)
69. Saint-Astier (47229)
70. Saint-Avit (47231)
71. Saint-Barthélemy-d'Agenais (47232)
72. Saint-Colomb-de-Lauzun (47235)
73. Sainte-Bazeille (47233)
74. Sainte-Colombe-de-Duras (47236)
75. Sainte-Gemme-Martaillac (47244)
76. Sainte-Marthe (47253)
77. Saint-Géraud (47245)
78. Saint-Jean-de-Duras (47247)
79. Saint-Martin-Petit (47257)
80. Saint-Pardoux-du-Breuil (47263)
81. Saint-Pardoux-Isaac (47264)
82. Saint-Pierre-sur-Dropt (47271)
83. Saint-Sauveur-de-Meilhan (47277)
84. Saint-Sernin (47278)
85. Samazan (47285)
86. La Sauvetat-du-Dropt (47290)
87. Savignac-de-Duras (47294)
88. Ségalas (47296)
89. Sénestis (47298)
90. Seyches (47301)
91. Soumensac (47303)
92. Taillebourg (47304)
93. Tonneins (47310)
94. Varès (47316)
95. Verteuil-d'Agenais (47317)
96. Villeneuve-de-Duras (47321)
97. Villeton (47325)
98. Virazeil (47326)

== History ==
The arrondissement of Marmande was created in 1800.

As a result of the reorganisation of the cantons of France which came into effect in 2015, the borders of the cantons are no longer related to the borders of the arrondissements. The cantons of the arrondissement of Marmande were, as of January 2015:

1. Bouglon
2. Castelmoron-sur-Lot
3. Duras
4. Lauzun
5. Marmande-Est
6. Marmande-Ouest
7. Le Mas-d'Agenais
8. Meilhan-sur-Garonne
9. Seyches
10. Tonneins
