= Sainte-Gemme-Martaillac =

- Commune
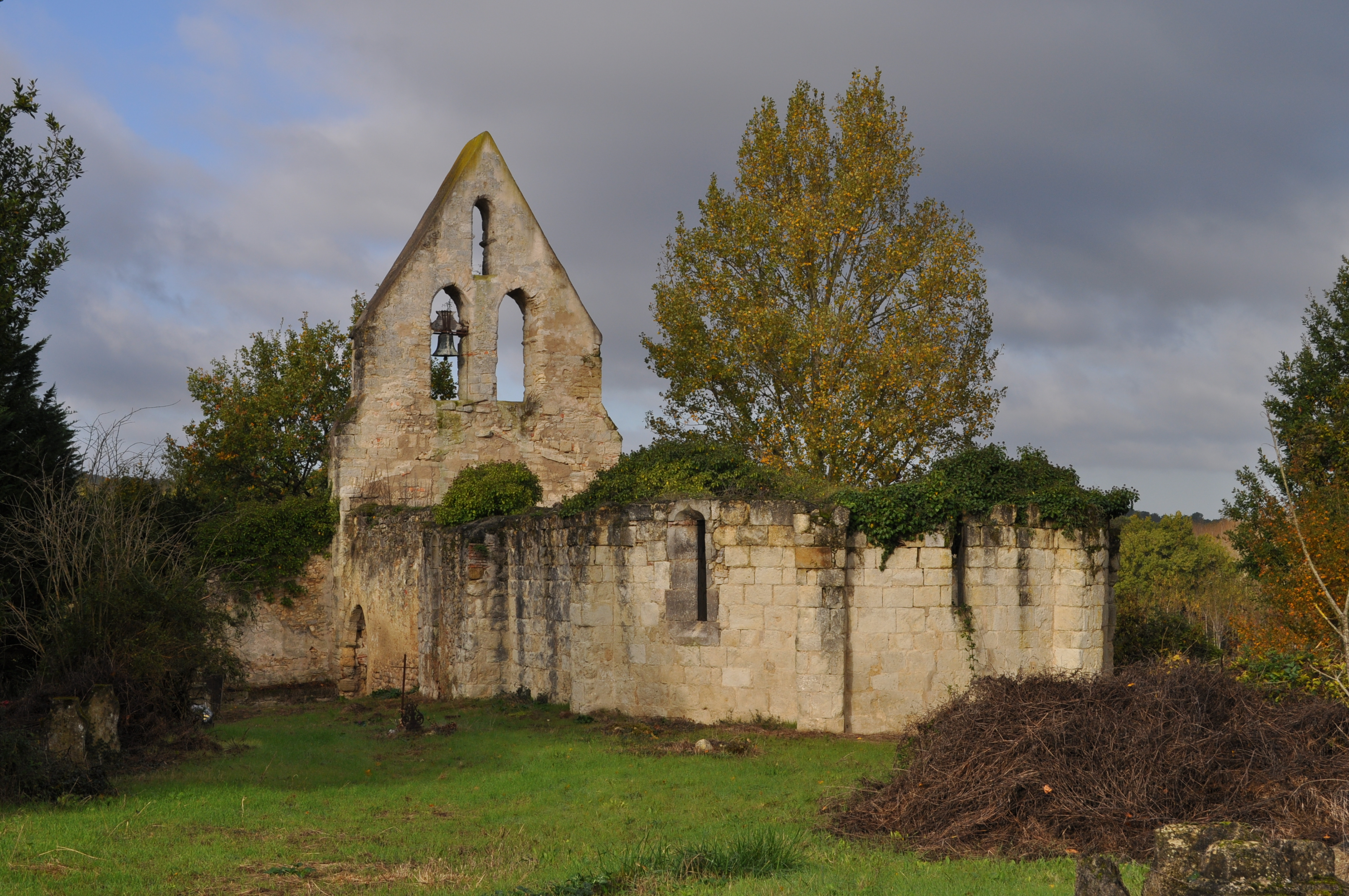
- The ruins of the church in Martaillac
- Location of Sainte-Gemme-Martaillac
- Location within France Location within Nouvelle-Aquitaine
- Coordinates: 44°22′02″N 0°09′11″E
- Country: France
- Region: Nouvelle-Aquitaine
- Department: Lot-et-Garonne
- Arrondissement: Marmande
- Canton: Les Forêts de Gascogne
- Intercommunality: Coteaux et Landes de Gascogne

Government
  - Mayor (2020–2026): Christine Merlin-Chabot
- Area^{1}: 14 km^{2} (5.4 sq mi)
- Elevation: 80 m (260 ft)
- Highest elevation: 156 m (512 ft)
- Lowest elevation: 58 m (190 ft)
- Population (2023): 377
  - Density: 27/km^{2} (70/sq mi)
- Time zone: UTC+01:00 (CET)
  - Summer (DST): UTC+02:00 (CEST)
- INSEE/Postal code: 47244 /47250
- ^{1} French Land Register data, which excludes lakes, ponds, glaciers > 1 km^{2} (0.386 sq mi or 247 acres) and river estuaries.

Sainte-Gemme-Martaillac (French pronunciation: [sɛ̃t ʒɛm maʁtajak]; Occitan: Senta Gema e Martalhac) is a commune in the Lot-et-Garonne department in south-western France.

== See also ==
- Communes of the Lot-et-Garonne department
