= Pompogne =

- Commune
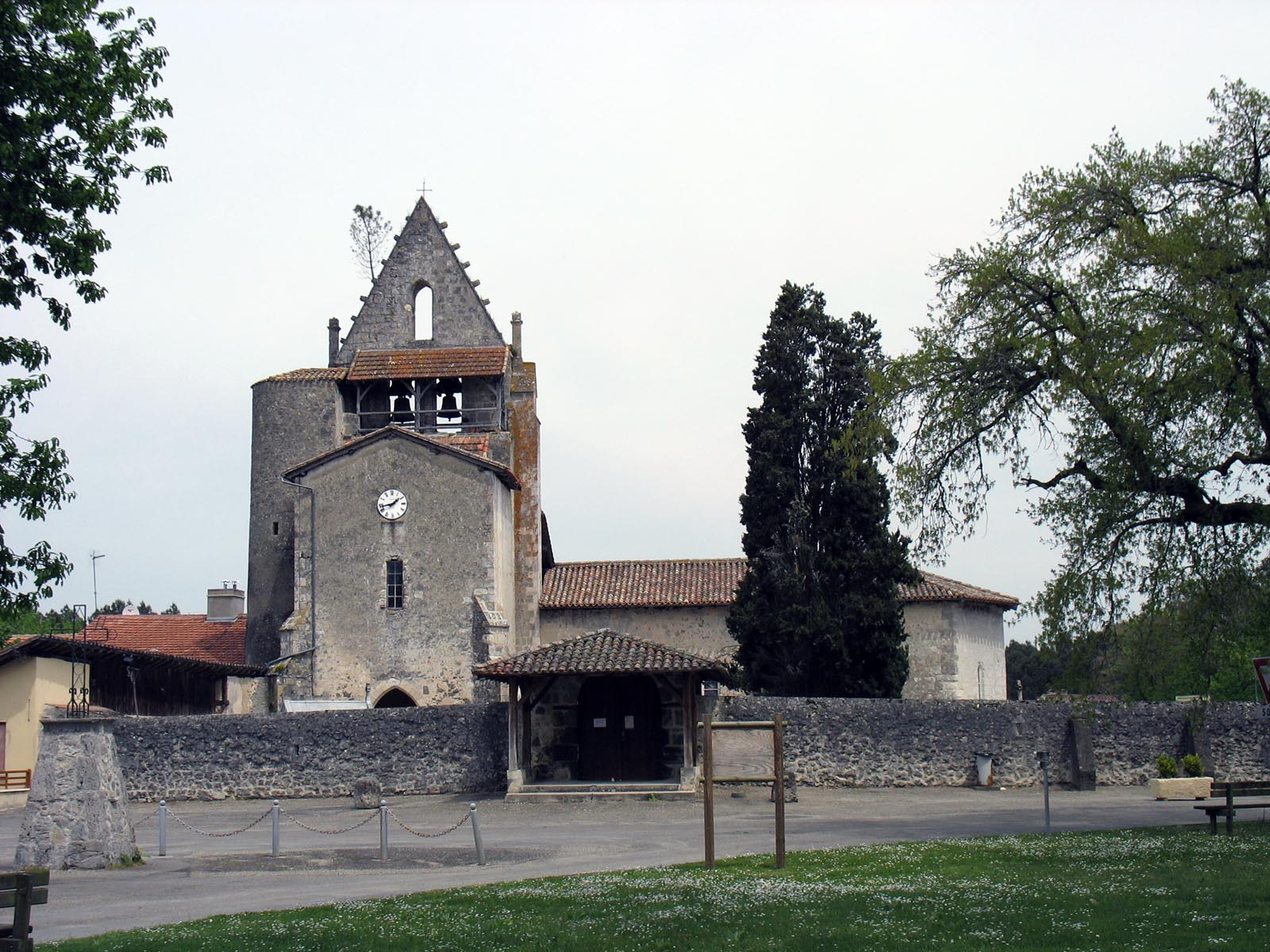
- The church in Pompogne
- Location of Pompogne
- Location within France Location within Nouvelle-Aquitaine
- Coordinates: 44°15′24″N 0°03′09″E
- Country: France
- Region: Nouvelle-Aquitaine
- Department: Lot-et-Garonne
- Arrondissement: Nérac
- Canton: Les Forêts de Gascogne
- Intercommunality: Coteaux et Landes de Gascogne

Government
  - Mayor (2020–2026): Jean-Pierre Adam
- Area^{1}: 35.96 km^{2} (13.88 sq mi)
- Elevation: 96 m (315 ft)
- Highest elevation: 147 m (482 ft)
- Lowest elevation: 77 m (253 ft)
- Population (2023): 192
  - Density: 5.34/km^{2} (13.8/sq mi)
- Time zone: UTC+01:00 (CET)
  - Summer (DST): UTC+02:00 (CEST)
- INSEE/Postal code: 47208 /47420
- ^{1} French Land Register data, which excludes lakes, ponds, glaciers > 1 km^{2} (0.386 sq mi or 247 acres) and river estuaries.

Pompogne (French pronunciation: [pɔ̃pɔɲ]; Occitan: Pompunha) is a commune in the Lot-et-Garonne department in south-western France.

== Demography ==
Historical population
Year	Pop.	±% p.a.
1968	127	—
1975	104	−2.81%
1982	105	+0.14%
1990	124	+2.10%
1999	138	+1.20%
2007	162	+2.02%
2012	199	+4.20%
2017	210	+1.08%
2023	192	−1.48%
Source: INSEE

== See also ==
- Communes of the Lot-et-Garonne department
