= Sauméjan =

- Commune
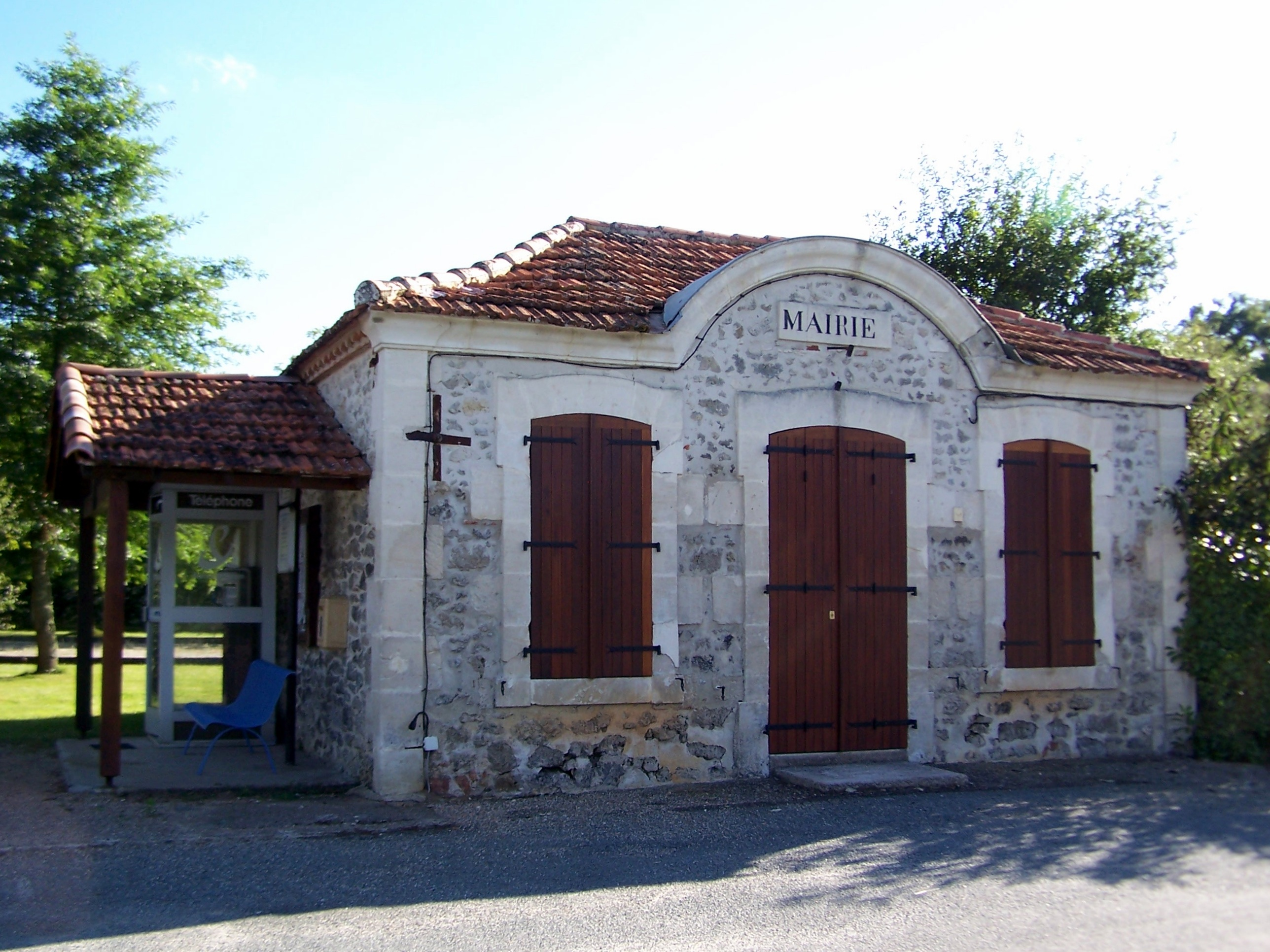
- The town hall in Sauméjan
- Location of Sauméjan
- Location within France Location within Nouvelle-Aquitaine
- Coordinates: 44°14′15″N 0°00′09″W
- Country: France
- Region: Nouvelle-Aquitaine
- Department: Lot-et-Garonne
- Arrondissement: Nérac
- Canton: Les Forêts de Gascogne
- Intercommunality: Coteaux et Landes de Gascogne

Government
  - Mayor (2020–2026): Françoise Rivetta-Bourras
- Area^{1}: 19.5 km^{2} (7.5 sq mi)
- Elevation: 120 m (390 ft)
- Highest elevation: 147 m (482 ft)
- Lowest elevation: 103 m (338 ft)
- Population (2023): 85
  - Density: 4.4/km^{2} (11/sq mi)
- Time zone: UTC+01:00 (CET)
  - Summer (DST): UTC+02:00 (CEST)
- INSEE/Postal code: 47286 /47420
- ^{1} French Land Register data, which excludes lakes, ponds, glaciers > 1 km^{2} (0.386 sq mi or 247 acres) and river estuaries.

Sauméjan (French pronunciation: [someʒɑ̃]; Occitan: Sautmejan) is a commune in the Lot-et-Garonne department in south-western France.

== See also ==
- Communes of the Lot-et-Garonne department
