= Boussès =

- Commune
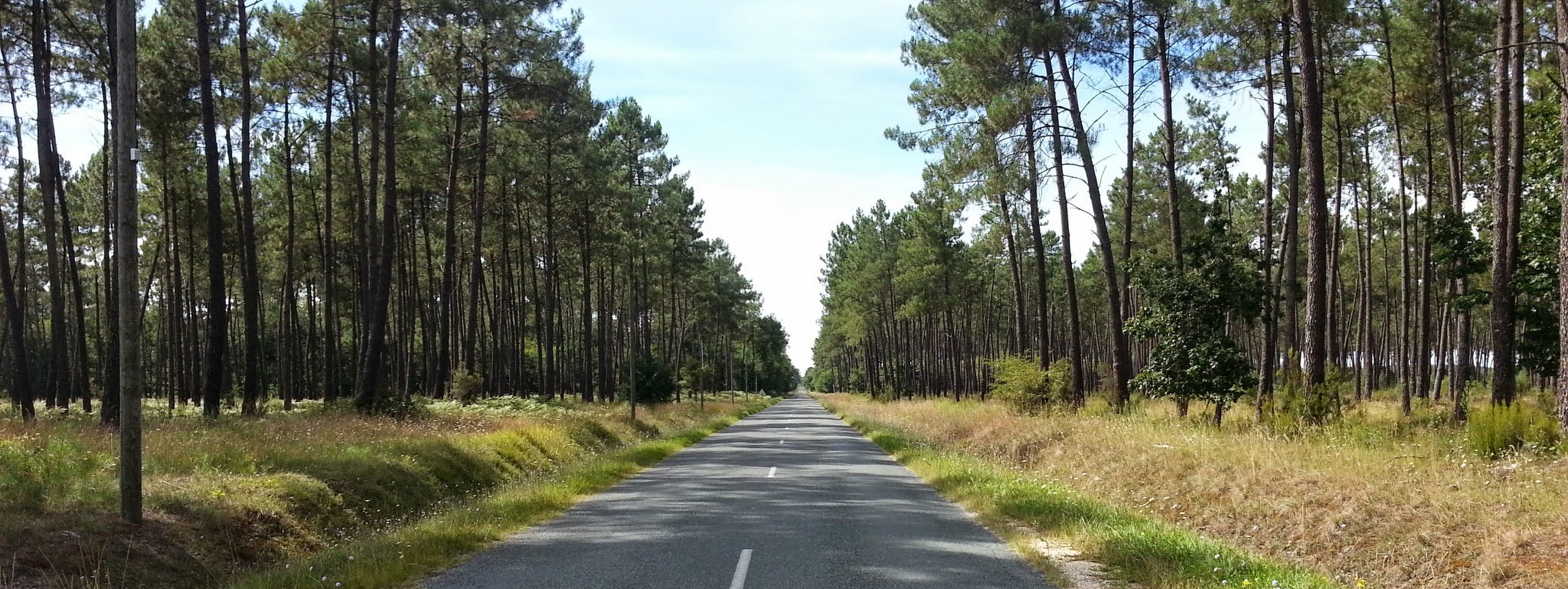
- Location of Boussès
- Location within France Location within Nouvelle-Aquitaine
- Coordinates: 44°08′48″N 0°05′41″E
- Country: France
- Region: Nouvelle-Aquitaine
- Department: Lot-et-Garonne
- Arrondissement: Nérac
- Canton: Les Forêts de Gascogne
- Intercommunality: Coteaux et Landes de Gascogne

Government
  - Mayor (2020–2026): François Thollon Pommerol
- Area^{1}: 47.14 km^{2} (18.20 sq mi)
- Elevation: 135 m (443 ft)
- Highest elevation: 161 m (528 ft)
- Lowest elevation: 115 m (377 ft)
- Population (2023): 41
  - Density: 0.87/km^{2} (2.3/sq mi)
- Time zone: UTC+01:00 (CET)
  - Summer (DST): UTC+02:00 (CEST)
- INSEE/Postal code: 47039 /47420
- ^{1} French Land Register data, which excludes lakes, ponds, glaciers > 1 km^{2} (0.386 sq mi or 247 acres) and river estuaries.

Boussès (French pronunciation: [busɛs]; Gascon: Bossés) is a commune in the Lot-et-Garonne department in southwestern France.

== Population ==
Historical population
Year	Pop.	±% p.a.
1968	99	—
1975	66	−5.63%
1982	57	−2.07%
1990	46	−2.64%
1999	41	−1.27%
2007	42	+0.30%
2012	42	+0.00%
2017	37	−2.50%
2023	41	+1.73%
Source: INSEE

== See also ==
- Communes of the Lot-et-Garonne department
