= Pindères =

- Commune
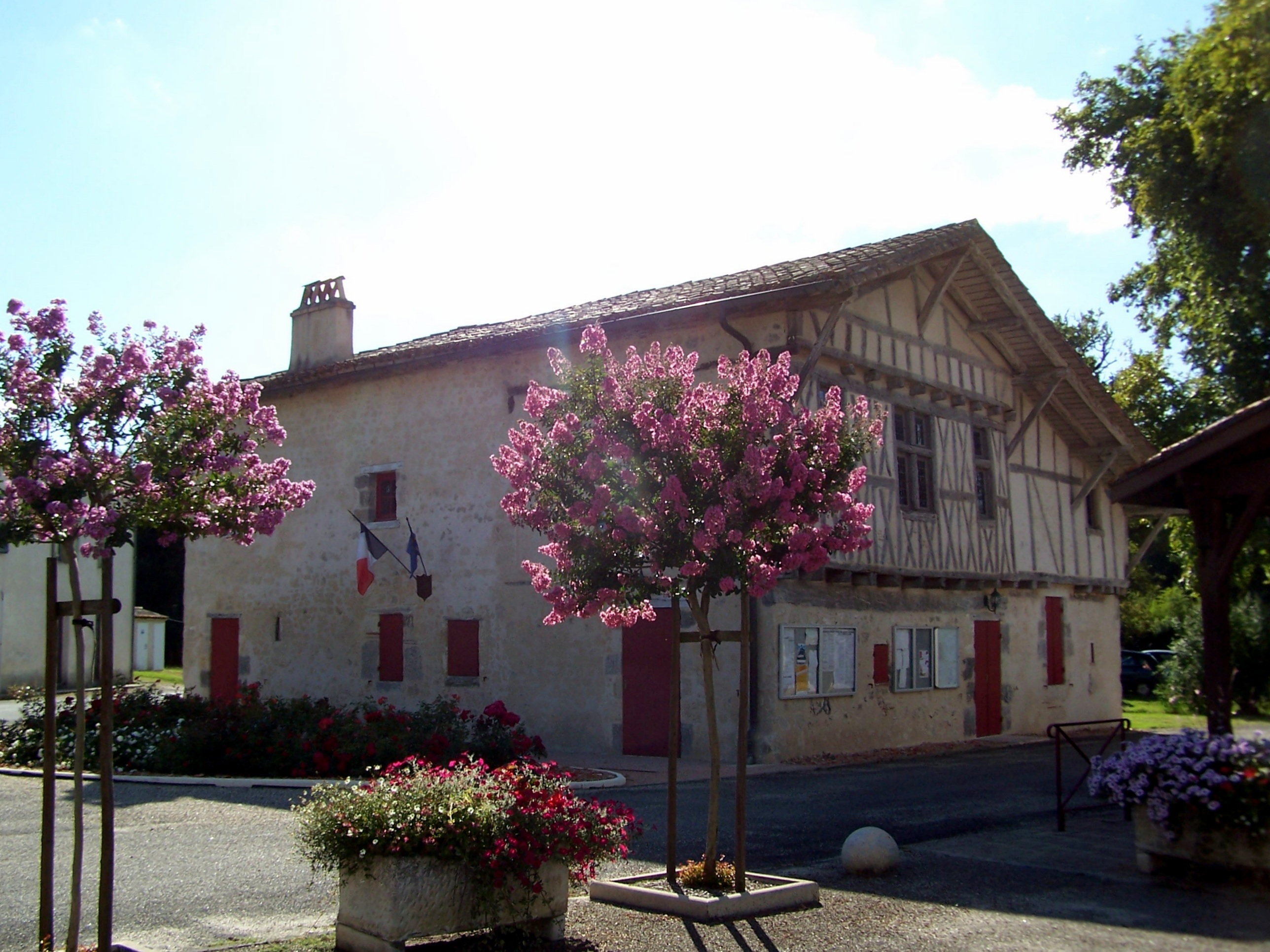
- The town hall in Pindères

- Coat of arms
- Location of Pindères
- Location within France Location within Nouvelle-Aquitaine
- Coordinates: 44°16′24″N 0°01′38″E
- Country: France
- Region: Nouvelle-Aquitaine
- Department: Lot-et-Garonne
- Arrondissement: Nérac
- Canton: Les Forêts de Gascogne
- Intercommunality: Coteaux et Landes de Gascogne

Government
  - Mayor (2020–2026): Michel Darrouman
- Area^{1}: 40.76 km^{2} (15.74 sq mi)
- Elevation: 85 m (279 ft)
- Highest elevation: 143 m (469 ft)
- Lowest elevation: 73 m (240 ft)
- Population (2023): 189
  - Density: 4.64/km^{2} (12.0/sq mi)
- Time zone: UTC+01:00 (CET)
  - Summer (DST): UTC+02:00 (CEST)
- INSEE/Postal code: 47205 /47700
- ^{1} French Land Register data, which excludes lakes, ponds, glaciers > 1 km^{2} (0.386 sq mi or 247 acres) and river estuaries.

Pindères (French pronunciation: [pɛ̃dɛʁ]; Occitan: Pindèras) is a commune in the Lot-et-Garonne department in south-western France.

== See also ==
- Communes of the Lot-et-Garonne department
