= Beauziac =

- Commune
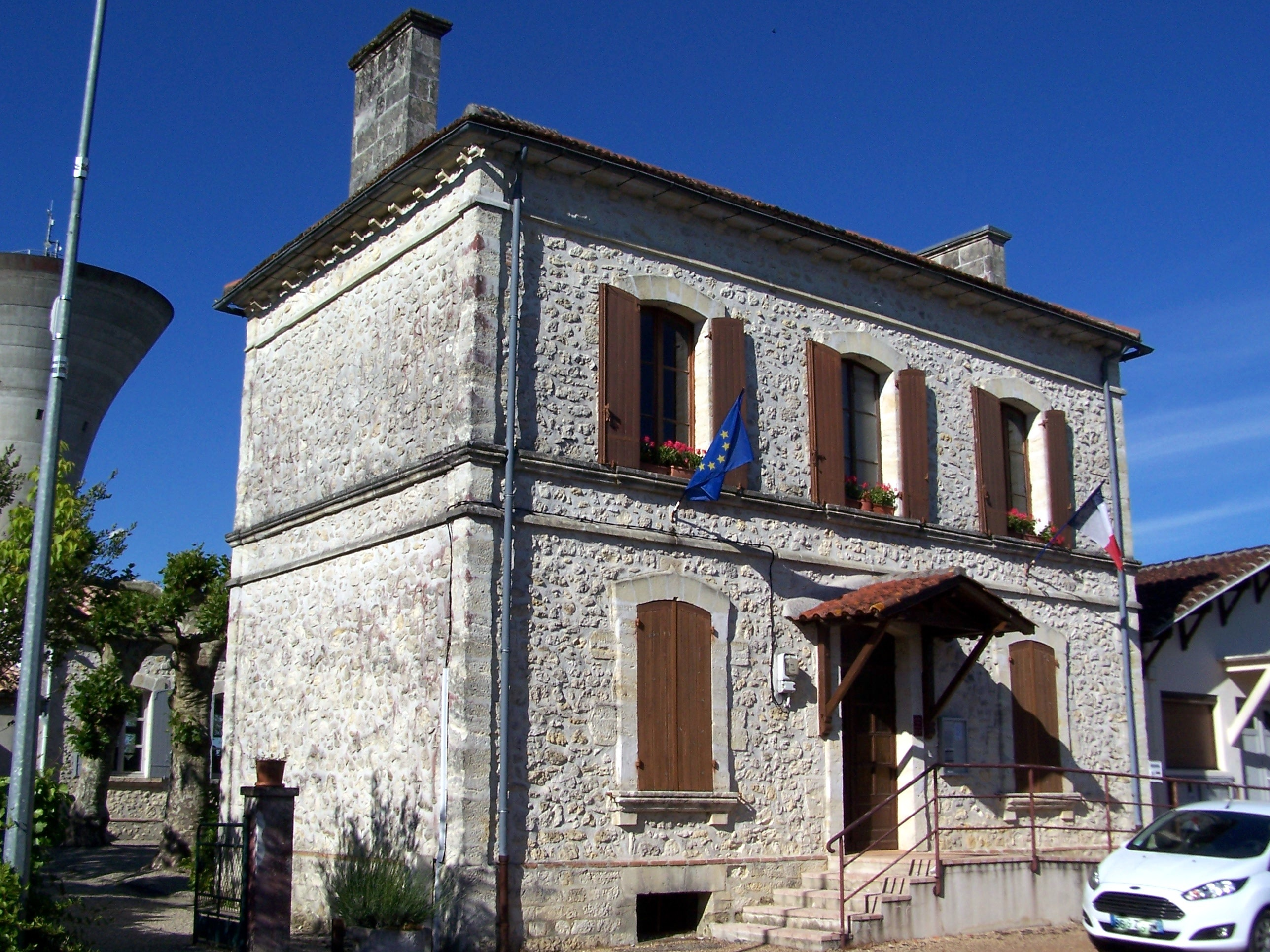
- The town hall in Beauziac
- Location of Beauziac
- Location within France Location within Nouvelle-Aquitaine
- Coordinates: 44°19′21″N 0°02′50″E
- Country: France
- Region: Nouvelle-Aquitaine
- Department: Lot-et-Garonne
- Arrondissement: Nérac
- Canton: Les Forêts de Gascogne
- Intercommunality: Coteaux et Landes de Gascogne

Government
  - Mayor (2020–2026): Dominique Roman
- Area^{1}: 15.34 km^{2} (5.92 sq mi)
- Elevation: 150 m (490 ft)
- Highest elevation: 163 m (535 ft)
- Lowest elevation: 77 m (253 ft)
- Population (2023): 241
  - Density: 15.7/km^{2} (40.7/sq mi)
- Time zone: UTC+01:00 (CET)
  - Summer (DST): UTC+02:00 (CEST)
- INSEE/Postal code: 47026 /47700
- ^{1} French Land Register data, which excludes lakes, ponds, glaciers > 1 km^{2} (0.386 sq mi or 247 acres) and river estuaries.

Beauziac (French pronunciation: [bozjak]; Occitan: Bausiac) is a commune in the Lot-et-Garonne department in southwestern France.

== Population ==
Historical population
Year	Pop.	±% p.a.
1968	192	—
1975	175	−1.32%
1982	173	−0.16%
1990	195	+1.51%
1999	215	+1.09%
2007	243	+1.54%
2012	260	+1.36%
2017	237	−1.84%
2023	241	+0.28%
Source: INSEE

== See also ==
- Communes of the Lot-et-Garonne department
