= Allons, Lot-et-Garonne =

Allons
- Commune
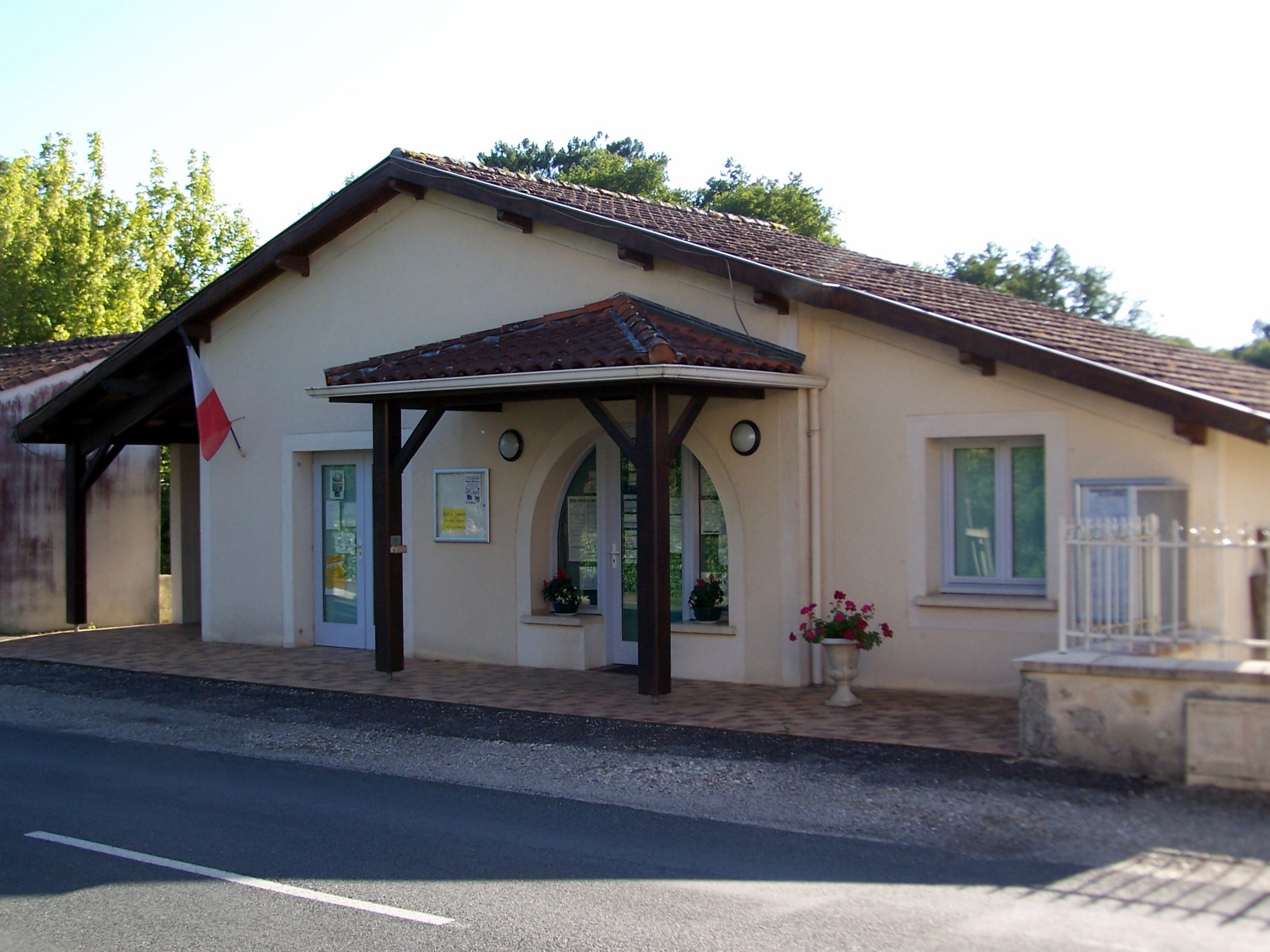
- The town hall in Allons
- Location of Allons
- Location within France Location within Nouvelle-Aquitaine
- Coordinates: 44°12′10″N 0°03′11″W
- Country: France
- Region: Nouvelle-Aquitaine
- Department: Lot-et-Garonne
- Arrondissement: Nérac
- Canton: Les Forêts de Gascogne
- Intercommunality: Coteaux et Landes de Gascogne

Government
  - Mayor (2020–2026): Jean-Marie Pons
- Area^{1}: 76.33 km^{2} (29.47 sq mi)
- Elevation: 138 m (453 ft)
- Highest elevation: 156 m (512 ft)
- Lowest elevation: 98 m (322 ft)
- Population (2023): 163
  - Density: 2.14/km^{2} (5.53/sq mi)
- Time zone: UTC+01:00 (CET)
  - Summer (DST): UTC+02:00 (CEST)
- INSEE/Postal code: 47007 /47420
- ^{1} French Land Register data, which excludes lakes, ponds, glaciers > 1 km^{2} (0.386 sq mi or 247 acres) and river estuaries.

Allons (Occitan: Va voler) is a commune in the Lot-et-Garonne department in southwestern France.

== Population ==
Historical population
Year	Pop.	±% p.a.
1968	247	—
1975	185	−4.04%
1982	152	−2.77%
1990	152	+0.00%
1999	172	+1.38%
2007	173	+0.07%
2012	174	+0.12%
2017	165	−1.06%
2023	163	−0.20%
Source: INSEE

== See also ==
- Communes of the Lot-et-Garonne department
