= Sainte-Marthe, Lot-et-Garonne =

Sainte-Marthe
- Commune
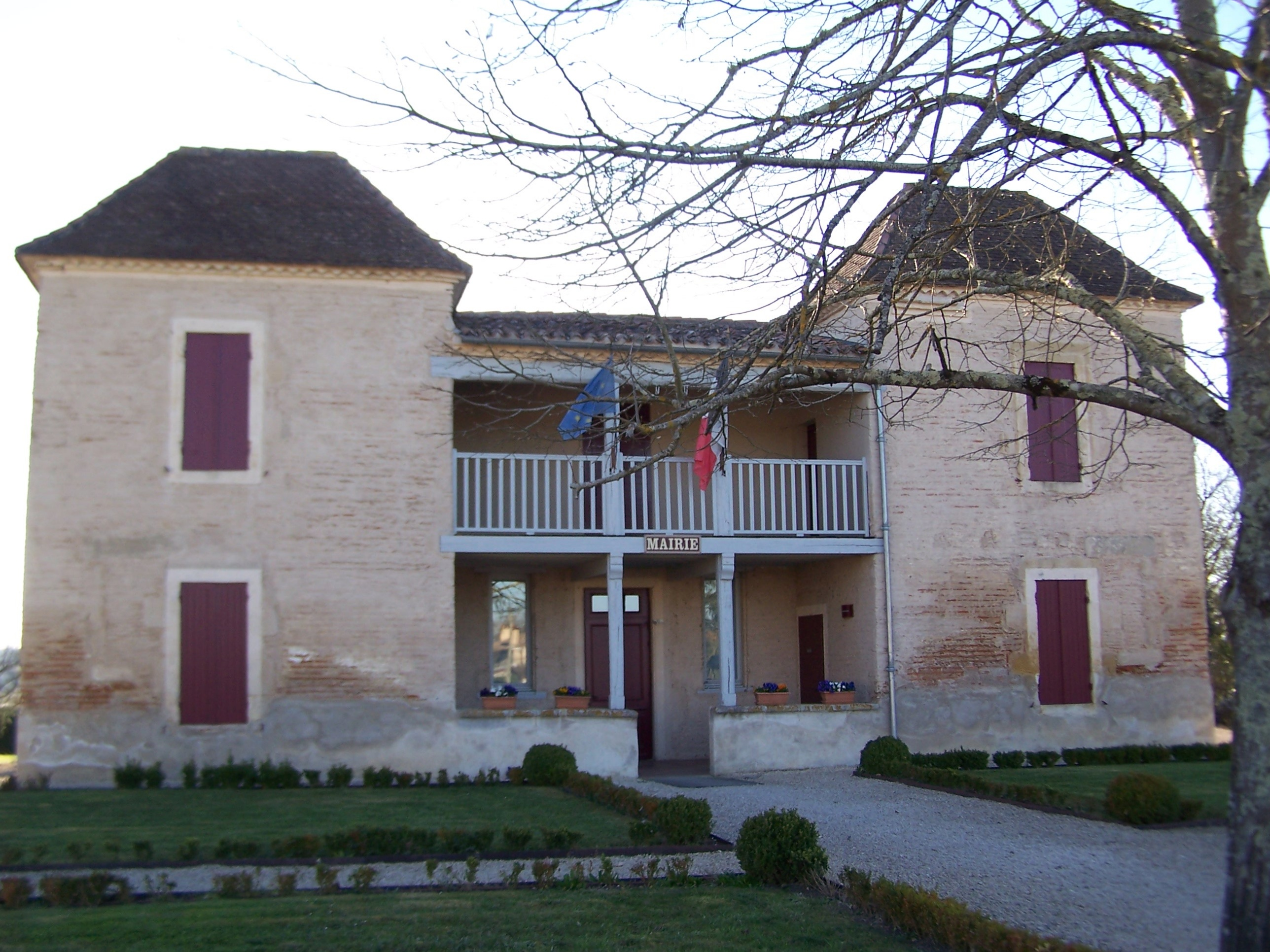
- Sainte-Marthe Town hall
- Location of Sainte-Marthe
- Location within France Location within Nouvelle-Aquitaine
- Coordinates: 44°24′53″N 0°08′59″E
- Country: France
- Region: Nouvelle-Aquitaine
- Department: Lot-et-Garonne
- Arrondissement: Marmande
- Canton: Les Forêts de Gascogne
- Intercommunality: Coteaux et Landes de Gascogne

Government
  - Mayor (2020–2026): Bernard Massias
- Area^{1}: 9.65 km^{2} (3.73 sq mi)
- Elevation: 79 m (259 ft)
- Highest elevation: 94 m (308 ft)
- Lowest elevation: 28 m (92 ft)
- Population (2023): 658
  - Density: 68.2/km^{2} (177/sq mi)
- Time zone: UTC+01:00 (CET)
  - Summer (DST): UTC+02:00 (CEST)
- INSEE/Postal code: 47253 /47430
- ^{1} French Land Register data, which excludes lakes, ponds, glaciers > 1 km^{2} (0.386 sq mi or 247 acres) and river estuaries.

Sainte-Marthe (Occitan: Sant Marta) is a commune in the Lot-et-Garonne department in south-western France.

== See also ==
- Communes of the Lot-et-Garonne department
