= Leyritz-Moncassin =

- Commune
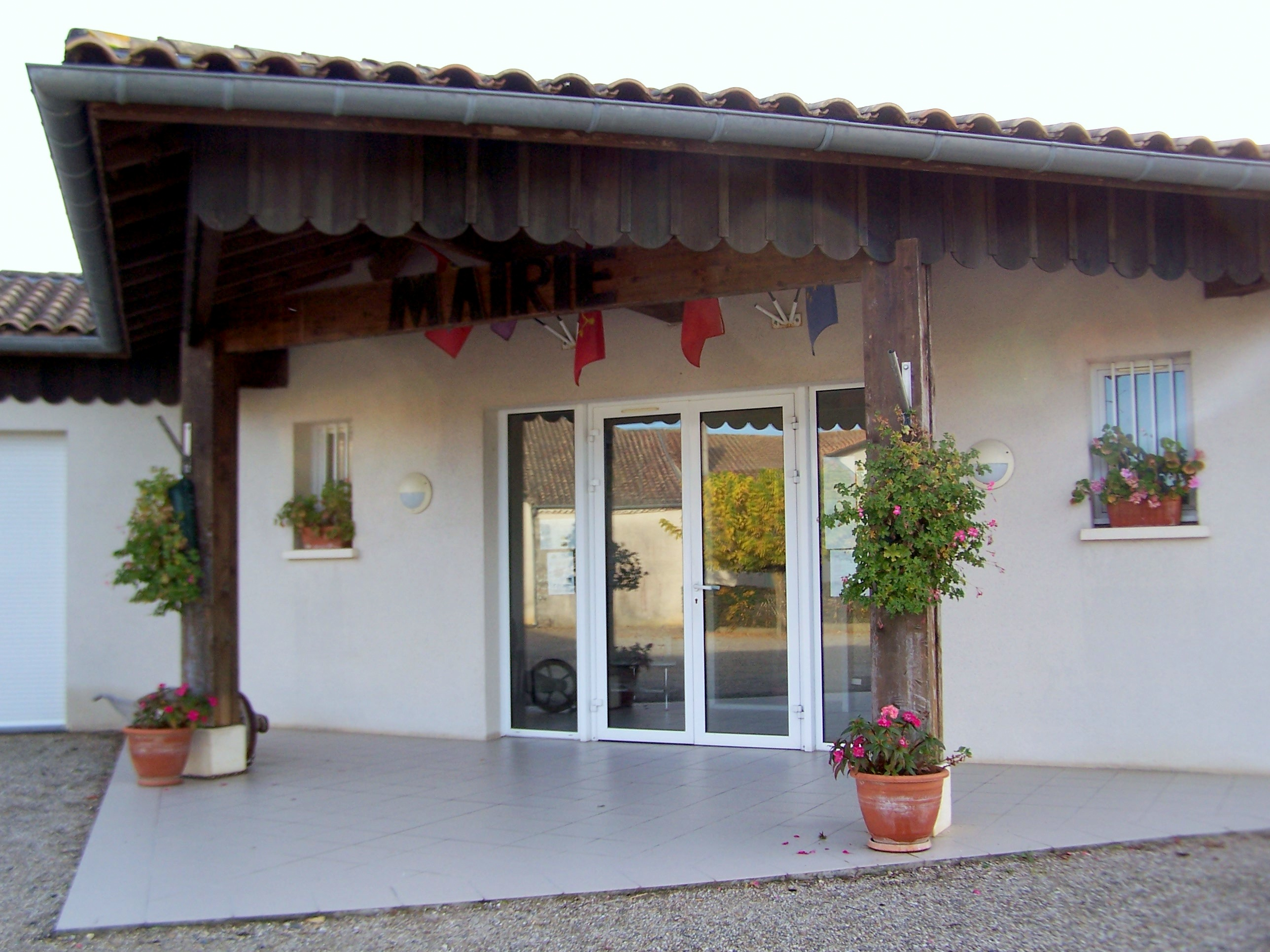
- Leyritz-Moncassin Town hall
- Location of Leyritz-Moncassin
- Location within France Location within Nouvelle-Aquitaine
- Coordinates: 44°19′41″N 0°09′42″E
- Country: France
- Region: Nouvelle-Aquitaine
- Department: Lot-et-Garonne
- Arrondissement: Nérac
- Canton: Les Forêts de Gascogne
- Intercommunality: Coteaux et Landes de Gascogne

Government
  - Mayor (2020–2026): Jean-Louis Boyance
- Area^{1}: 20.24 km^{2} (7.81 sq mi)
- Elevation: 172 m (564 ft)
- Highest elevation: 175 m (574 ft)
- Lowest elevation: 45 m (148 ft)
- Population (2023): 206
  - Density: 10.2/km^{2} (26.4/sq mi)
- Time zone: UTC+01:00 (CET)
  - Summer (DST): UTC+02:00 (CEST)
- INSEE/Postal code: 47148 /47700
- ^{1} French Land Register data, which excludes lakes, ponds, glaciers > 1 km^{2} (0.386 sq mi or 247 acres) and river estuaries.

Leyritz-Moncassin (French pronunciation: [lɛʁits mɔ̃kasɛ̃]; Occitan: Lairitz e Montcassin) is a commune in the Lot-et-Garonne department in south-western France.

== See also ==
- Communes of the Lot-et-Garonne department
