= Grézet-Cavagnan =

- Commune
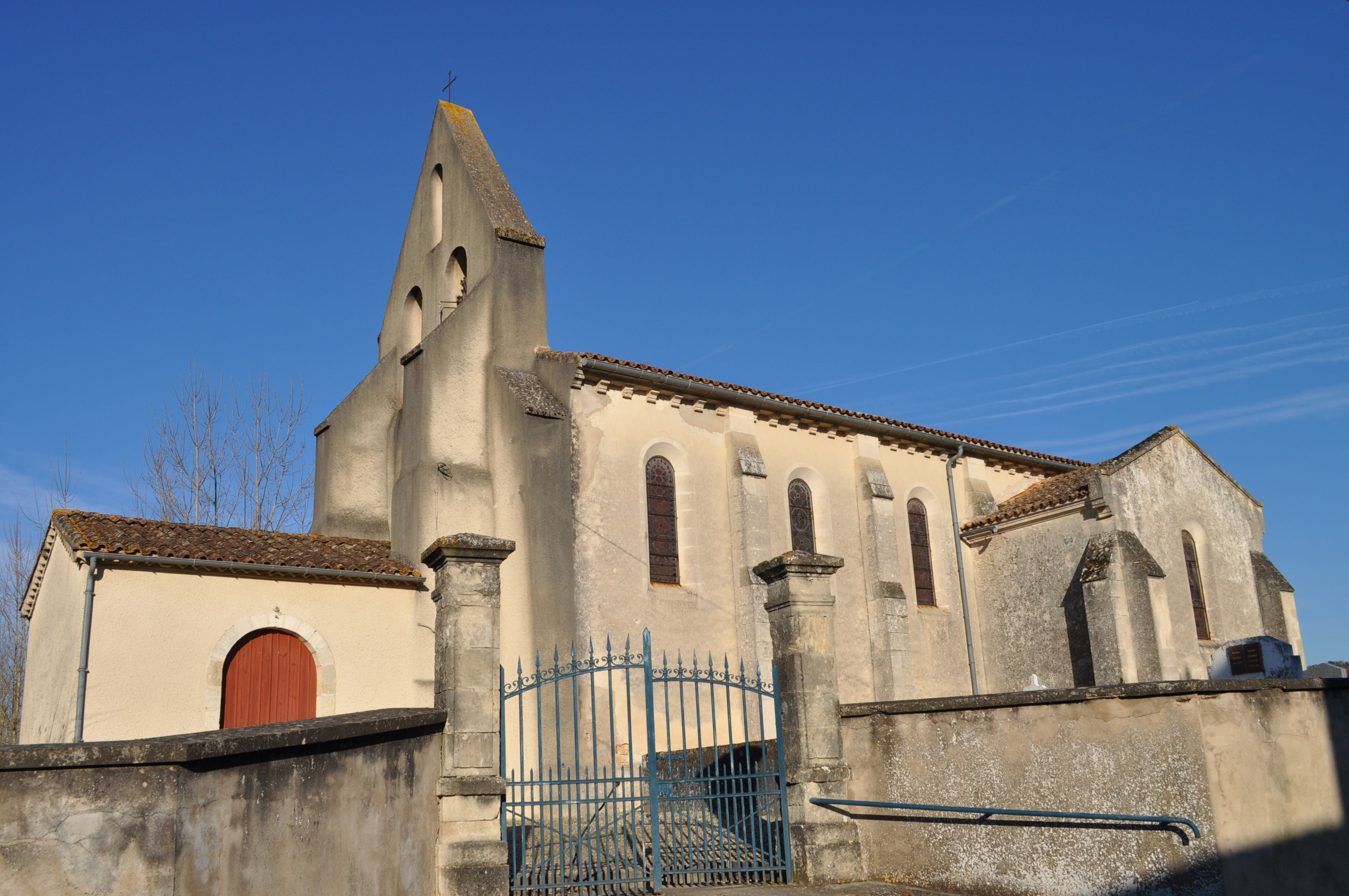
- The church in Grézet-Cavagnan
- Location of Grézet-Cavagnan
- Location within France Location within Nouvelle-Aquitaine
- Coordinates: 44°23′04″N 0°07′59″E
- Country: France
- Region: Nouvelle-Aquitaine
- Department: Lot-et-Garonne
- Arrondissement: Marmande
- Canton: Les Forêts de Gascogne
- Intercommunality: Coteaux et Landes de Gascogne

Government
  - Mayor (2020–2026): Aymeric Dupuy
- Area^{1}: 12.55 km^{2} (4.85 sq mi)
- Elevation: 400 m (1,300 ft)
- Highest elevation: 157 m (515 ft)
- Lowest elevation: 39 m (128 ft)
- Population (2023): 409
  - Density: 32.6/km^{2} (84.4/sq mi)
- Time zone: UTC+01:00 (CET)
  - Summer (DST): UTC+02:00 (CEST)
- INSEE/Postal code: 47114 /47250
- ^{1} French Land Register data, which excludes lakes, ponds, glaciers > 1 km^{2} (0.386 sq mi or 247 acres) and river estuaries.

Grézet-Cavagnan (French pronunciation: [ɡʁezɛ kavaɲɑ̃]; Occitan: Lo Gresèth e Cavanhan) is a commune in the Lot-et-Garonne department in south-western France.

== See also ==
- Communes of the Lot-et-Garonne department
