= Caubeyres =

- Commune
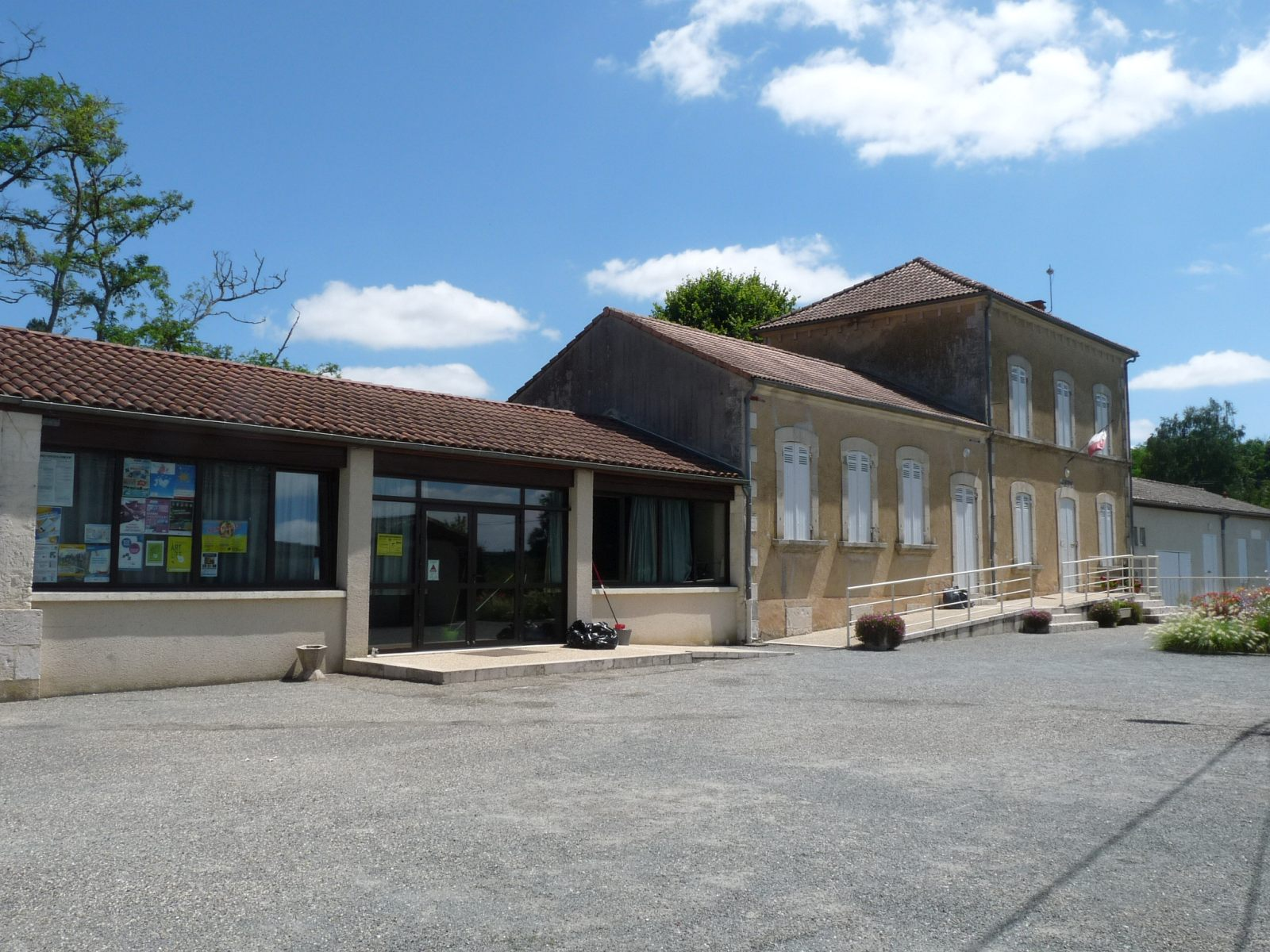
- Location of Caubeyres
- Location within France Location within Nouvelle-Aquitaine
- Coordinates: 44°15′30″N 0°12′10″E
- Country: France
- Region: Nouvelle-Aquitaine
- Department: Lot-et-Garonne
- Arrondissement: Nérac
- Canton: Les Forêts de Gascogne
- Intercommunality: Coteaux et Landes de Gascogne

Government
  - Mayor (2020–2026): Marie-Françoise Carles
- Area^{1}: 14.39 km^{2} (5.56 sq mi)
- Elevation: 119 m (390 ft)
- Highest elevation: 183 m (600 ft)
- Lowest elevation: 85 m (279 ft)
- Population (2023): 277
  - Density: 19.2/km^{2} (49.9/sq mi)
- Time zone: UTC+01:00 (CET)
  - Summer (DST): UTC+02:00 (CEST)
- INSEE/Postal code: 47058 /47160
- ^{1} French Land Register data, which excludes lakes, ponds, glaciers > 1 km^{2} (0.386 sq mi or 247 acres) and river estuaries.

Caubeyres (French pronunciation: [kobɛjʁ]; Occitan: Cauvèiras) is a commune in the Lot-et-Garonne department in south-western France.

== See also ==
- Communes of the Lot-et-Garonne department
