= Durance, Lot-et-Garonne =

Durance
- Commune
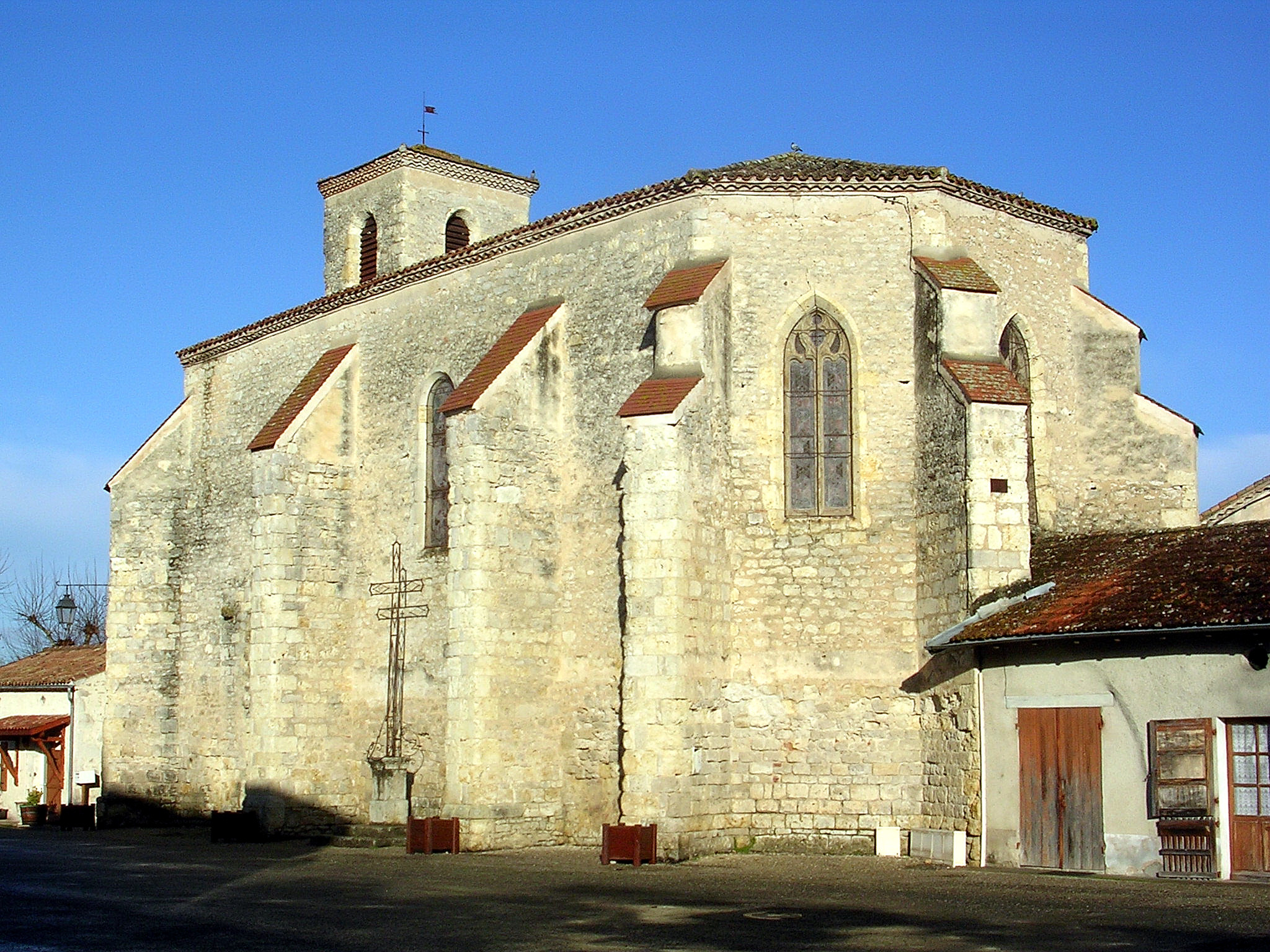
- The church in Durance
- Location of Durance
- Location within France Location within Nouvelle-Aquitaine
- Coordinates: 44°09′51″N 0°09′42″E
- Country: France
- Region: Nouvelle-Aquitaine
- Department: Lot-et-Garonne
- Arrondissement: Nérac
- Canton: Les Forêts de Gascogne
- Intercommunality: Coteaux et Landes de Gascogne

Government
  - Mayor (2023–2026): Sylvain Da Dalt
- Area^{1}: 38.6 km^{2} (14.9 sq mi)
- Highest elevation: 166 m (545 ft)
- Lowest elevation: 111 m (364 ft)
- Population (2023): 255
  - Density: 6.61/km^{2} (17.1/sq mi)
- Time zone: UTC+01:00 (CET)
  - Summer (DST): UTC+02:00 (CEST)
- INSEE/Postal code: 47085 /47420
- ^{1} French Land Register data, which excludes lakes, ponds, glaciers > 1 km^{2} (0.386 sq mi or 247 acres) and river estuaries.

Durance (French pronunciation: [dyʁɑ̃s]; Occitan: Durança) is a commune in the Lot-et-Garonne department in south-western France.

== See also ==
- Communes of the Lot-et-Garonne department
