= Houeillès =

- Commune
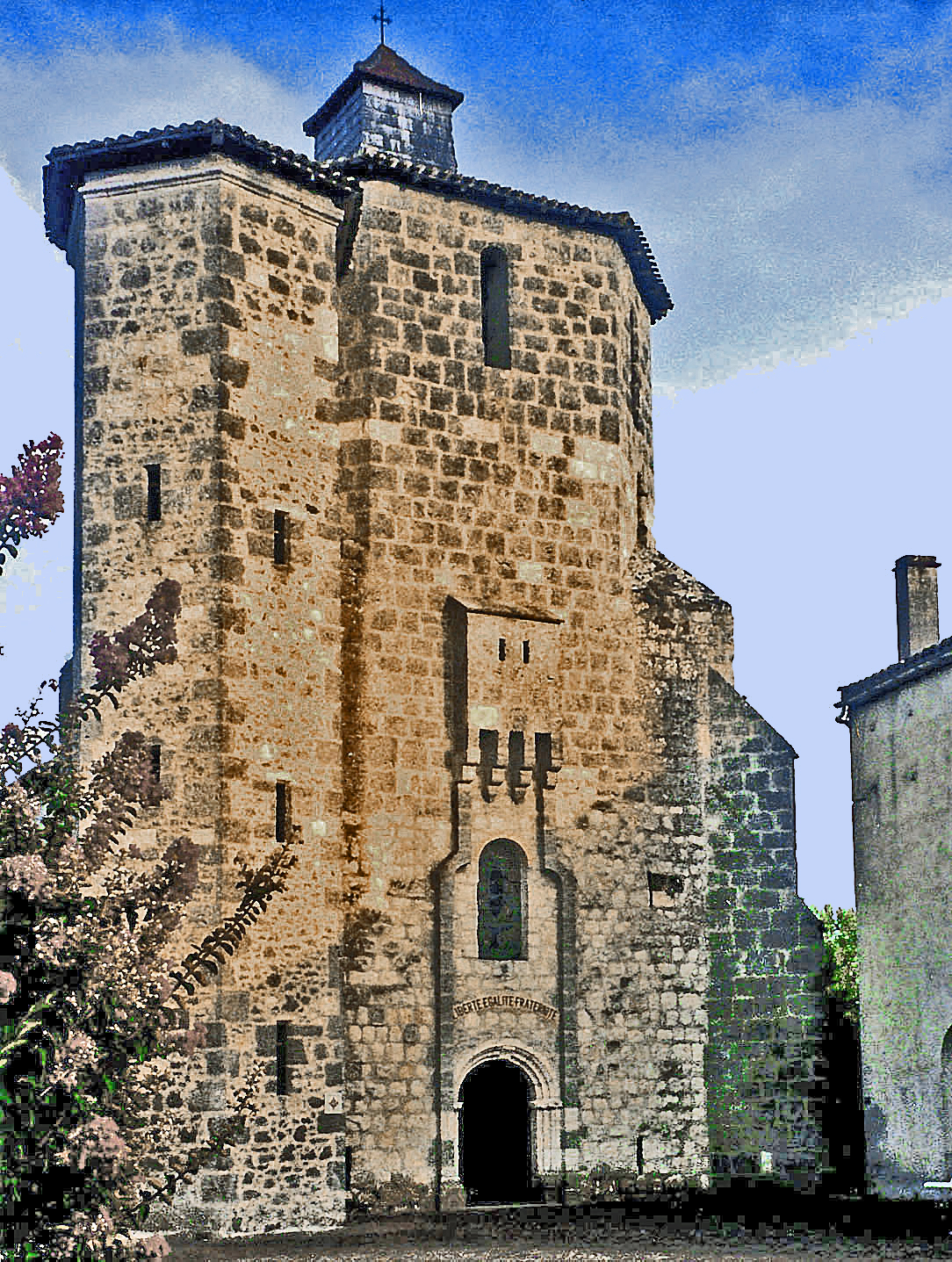
- The church tower in Houeillès
- Location of Houeillès
- Location within France Location within Nouvelle-Aquitaine
- Coordinates: 44°11′53″N 0°02′05″E
- Country: France
- Region: Nouvelle-Aquitaine
- Department: Lot-et-Garonne
- Arrondissement: Nérac
- Canton: Les Forêts de Gascogne
- Intercommunality: Coteaux et Landes de Gascogne

Government
  - Mayor (2020–2026): Chrystel Colmagro
- Area^{1}: 67.63 km^{2} (26.11 sq mi)
- Highest elevation: 153 m (502 ft)
- Lowest elevation: 97 m (318 ft)
- Population (2023): 559
  - Density: 8.27/km^{2} (21.4/sq mi)
- Time zone: UTC+01:00 (CET)
  - Summer (DST): UTC+02:00 (CEST)
- INSEE/Postal code: 47119 /47420
- ^{1} French Land Register data, which excludes lakes, ponds, glaciers > 1 km^{2} (0.386 sq mi or 247 acres) and river estuaries.

Houeillès (French pronunciation: [wɛjɛs]; Occitan: Hoalhés) is a commune in the Lot-et-Garonne department in south-western France.

== See also ==
- Communes of the Lot-et-Garonne department
