= Bouglon =

- Commune
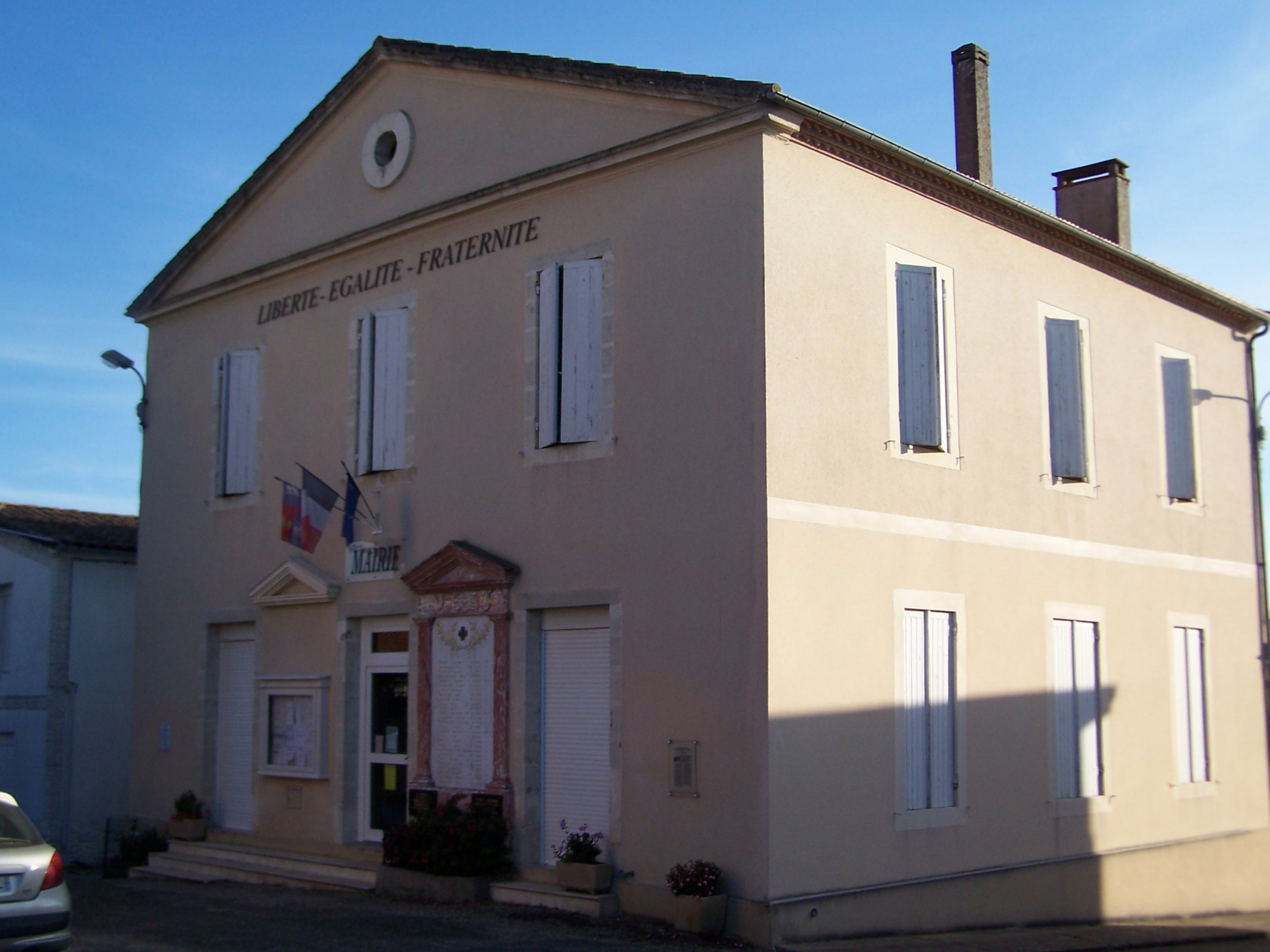
- The town hall in Bouglon

- Coat of arms
- Location of Bouglon
- Location within France Location within Nouvelle-Aquitaine
- Coordinates: 44°23′39″N 0°05′52″E
- Country: France
- Region: Nouvelle-Aquitaine
- Department: Lot-et-Garonne
- Arrondissement: Marmande
- Canton: Les Forêts de Gascogne
- Intercommunality: Coteaux et Landes de Gascogne

Government
  - Mayor (2020–2026): José Balaguer
- Area^{1}: 13.92 km^{2} (5.37 sq mi)
- Elevation: 49 m (161 ft)
- Highest elevation: 143 m (469 ft)
- Lowest elevation: 35 m (115 ft)
- Population (2023): 630
  - Density: 45/km^{2} (120/sq mi)
- Time zone: UTC+01:00 (CET)
  - Summer (DST): UTC+02:00 (CEST)
- INSEE/Postal code: 47034 /47250
- ^{1} French Land Register data, which excludes lakes, ponds, glaciers > 1 km^{2} (0.386 sq mi or 247 acres) and river estuaries.

Bouglon (French pronunciation: [buɡlɔ̃]; Occitan: Boglon) is a commune in the Lot-et-Garonne department in southwestern France.

== Population ==
Historical population
Year	Pop.	±% p.a.
1968	540	—
1975	516	−0.65%
1982	503	−0.36%
1990	532	+0.70%
1999	528	−0.08%
2007	583	+1.25%
2012	607	+0.81%
2017	616	+0.29%
2023	630	+0.38%
Source: INSEE

== See also ==
- Communes of the Lot-et-Garonne department
