= Lagruère =

- Commune
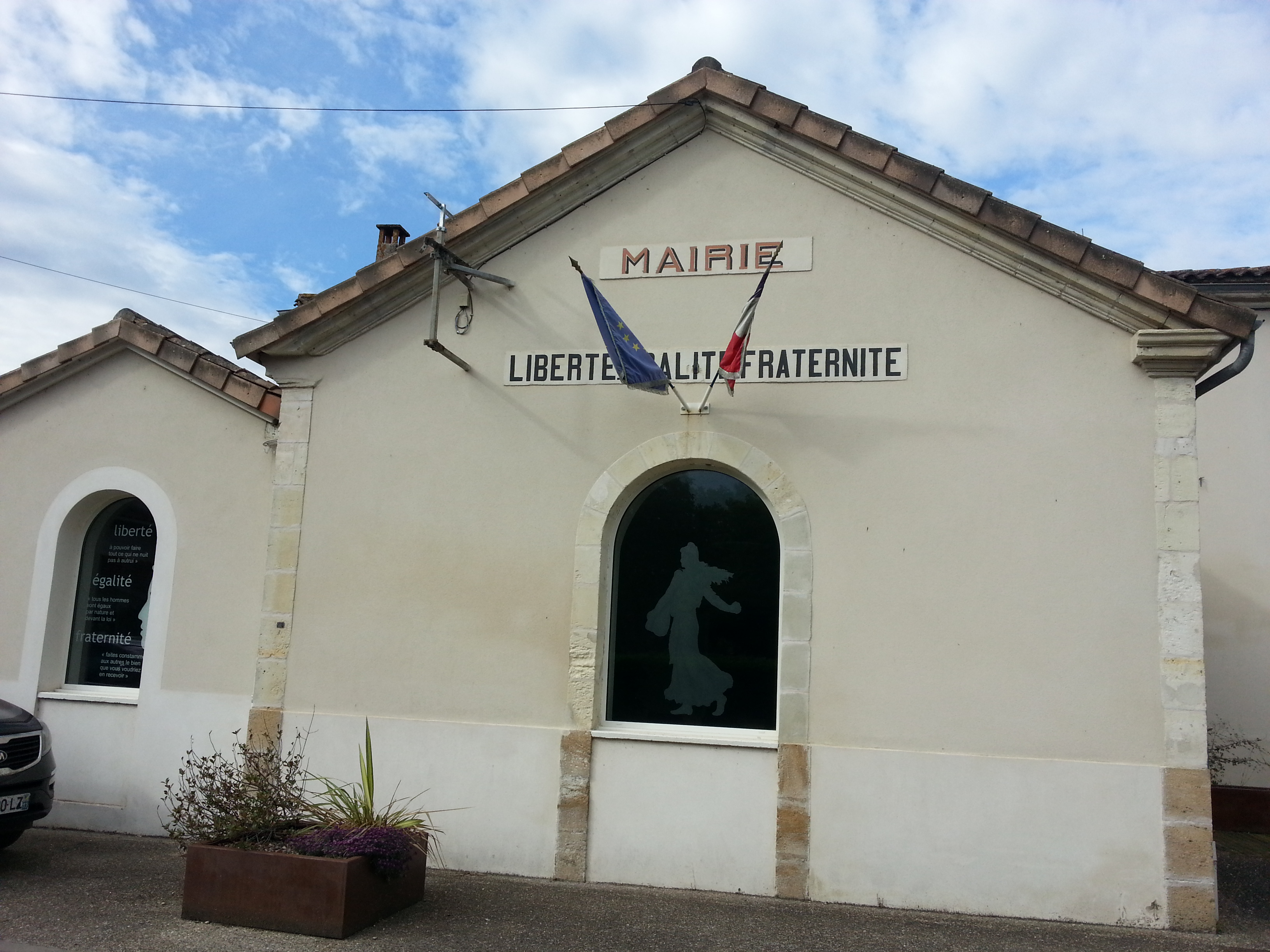
- Lagruère Town hall

- Coat of arms
- Location of Lagruère
- Location within France Location within Nouvelle-Aquitaine
- Coordinates: 44°24′06″N 0°14′34″E
- Country: France
- Region: Nouvelle-Aquitaine
- Department: Lot-et-Garonne
- Arrondissement: Marmande
- Canton: Les Forêts de Gascogne
- Intercommunality: Val de Garonne Agglomération

Government
  - Mayor (2020–2026): Jacques Verdelet
- Area^{1}: 9.86 km^{2} (3.81 sq mi)
- Elevation: 46 m (151 ft)
- Highest elevation: 44 m (144 ft)
- Lowest elevation: 22 m (72 ft)
- Population (2023): 351
  - Density: 35.6/km^{2} (92.2/sq mi)
- Time zone: UTC+01:00 (CET)
  - Summer (DST): UTC+02:00 (CEST)
- INSEE/Postal code: 47130 /47400
- ^{1} French Land Register data, which excludes lakes, ponds, glaciers > 1 km^{2} (0.386 sq mi or 247 acres) and river estuaries.

Lagruère is a commune in the Lot-et-Garonne department in south-western France.

== See also ==
- Communes of the Lot-et-Garonne department
