= Calonges =

- Commune
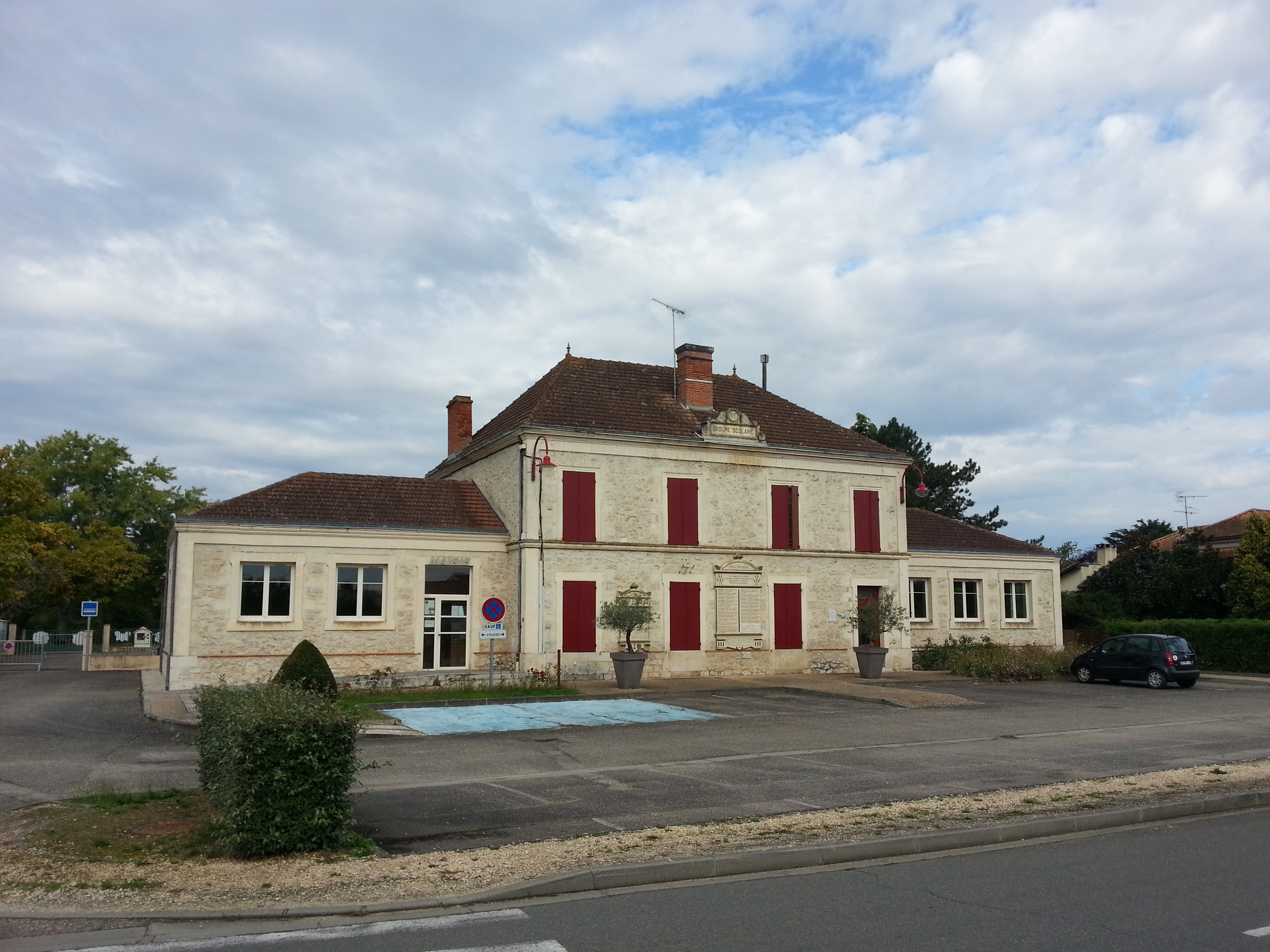
- Calonges Town hall
- Location of Calonges
- Location within France Location within Nouvelle-Aquitaine
- Coordinates: 44°22′30″N 0°14′29″E
- Country: France
- Region: Nouvelle-Aquitaine
- Department: Lot-et-Garonne
- Arrondissement: Marmande
- Canton: Les Forêts de Gascogne
- Intercommunality: Val de Garonne Agglomération

Government
  - Mayor (2020–2026): François Néraud
- Area^{1}: 15.99 km^{2} (6.17 sq mi)
- Elevation: 35 m (115 ft)
- Highest elevation: 94 m (308 ft)
- Lowest elevation: 26 m (85 ft)
- Population (2023): 581
  - Density: 36.3/km^{2} (94.1/sq mi)
- Time zone: UTC+01:00 (CET)
  - Summer (DST): UTC+02:00 (CEST)
- INSEE/Postal code: 47046 /47430
- ^{1} French Land Register data, which excludes lakes, ponds, glaciers > 1 km^{2} (0.386 sq mi or 247 acres) and river estuaries.

Calonges (French pronunciation: [kalɔ̃ʒ]; Occitan: Calonjas) is a commune in the Lot-et-Garonne department in south-western France.

== See also ==
- Communes of the Lot-et-Garonne department
