= Canton of Les Forêts de Gascogne =

Coordinates: 44.31°N 0.09°E

The canton of Les Forêts de Gascogne is an administrative division of the Lot-et-Garonne department, southwestern France. It was created at the French canton reorganisation which came into effect in March 2015. Its seat is in Casteljaloux.

It consists of the following communes:

1. Allons
2. Antagnac
3. Anzex
4. Argenton
5. Beauziac
6. Bouglon
7. Boussès
8. Calonges
9. Casteljaloux
10. Caubeyres
11. Durance
12. Fargues-sur-Ourbise
13. Grézet-Cavagnan
14. Guérin
15. Houeillès
16. Labastide-Castel-Amouroux
17. Lagruère
18. Leyritz-Moncassin
19. Le Mas-d'Agenais
20. Pindères
21. Pompogne
22. Poussignac
23. La Réunion
24. Romestaing
25. Ruffiac
26. Sainte-Gemme-Martaillac
27. Sainte-Marthe
28. Saint-Martin-Curton
29. Sauméjan
30. Sénestis
31. Villefranche-du-Queyran
32. Villeton
