= Fargues-sur-Ourbise =

- Commune
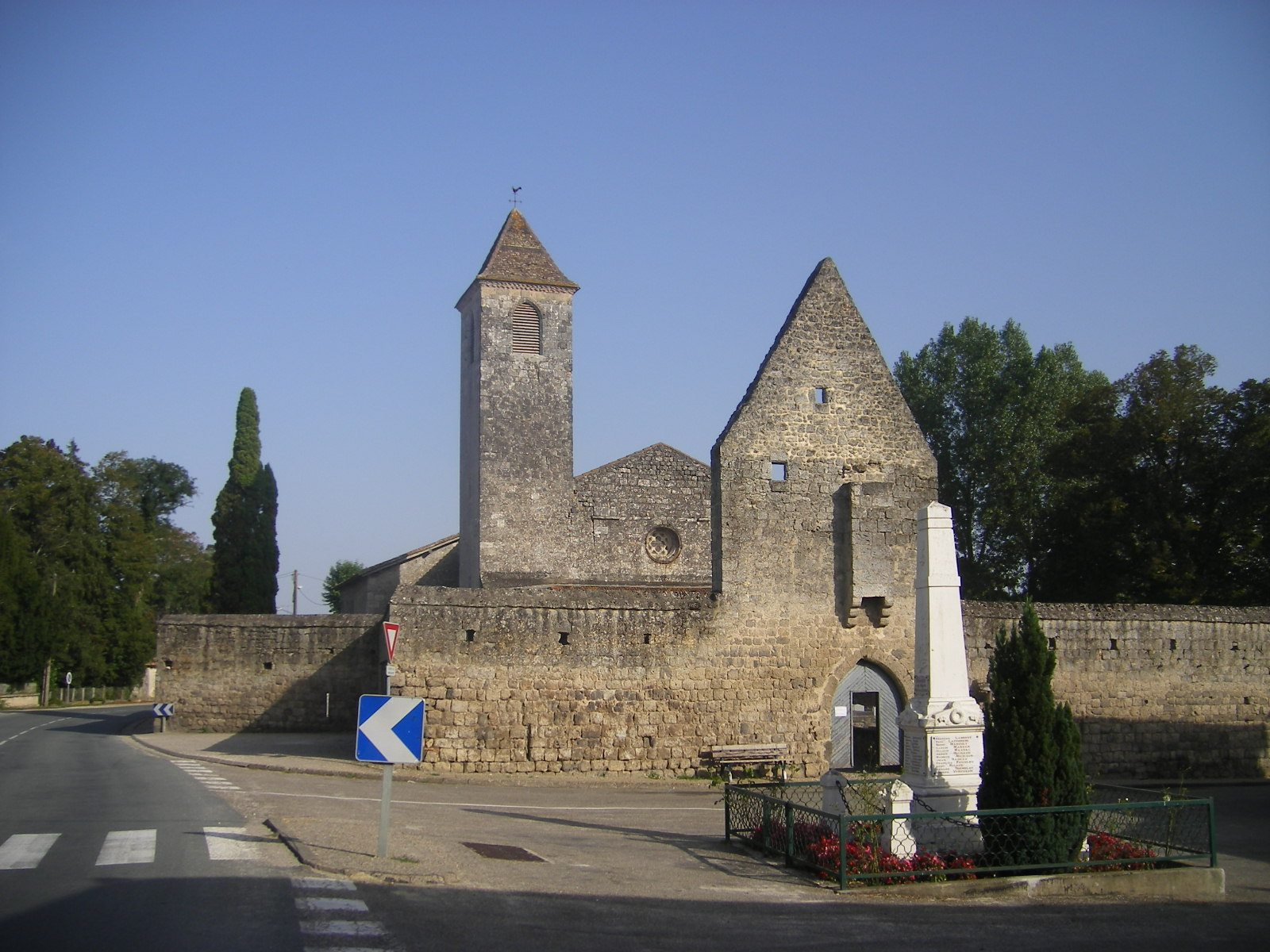
- The church in Fargues-sur-Ourbise

- Coat of arms
- Location of Fargues-sur-Ourbise
- Location within France Location within Nouvelle-Aquitaine
- Coordinates: 44°14′26″N 0°09′20″E
- Country: France
- Region: Nouvelle-Aquitaine
- Department: Lot-et-Garonne
- Arrondissement: Nérac
- Canton: Les Forêts de Gascogne
- Intercommunality: Coteaux et Landes de Gascogne

Government
  - Mayor (2020–2026): Michel Ponthoreau
- Area^{1}: 44.16 km^{2} (17.05 sq mi)
- Elevation: 119 m (390 ft)
- Highest elevation: 175 m (574 ft)
- Lowest elevation: 89 m (292 ft)
- Population (2023): 338
  - Density: 7.65/km^{2} (19.8/sq mi)
- Time zone: UTC+01:00 (CET)
  - Summer (DST): UTC+02:00 (CEST)
- INSEE/Postal code: 47093 /47700
- ^{1} French Land Register data, which excludes lakes, ponds, glaciers > 1 km^{2} (0.386 sq mi or 247 acres) and river estuaries.

Fargues-sur-Ourbise (French pronunciation: [faʁɡ syʁ uʁbiz]; Occitan: Hargas d'Orbisa) is a commune in the Lot-et-Garonne department in south-western France.

== See also ==
- Communes of the Lot-et-Garonne department
