= Villeton =

- Commune
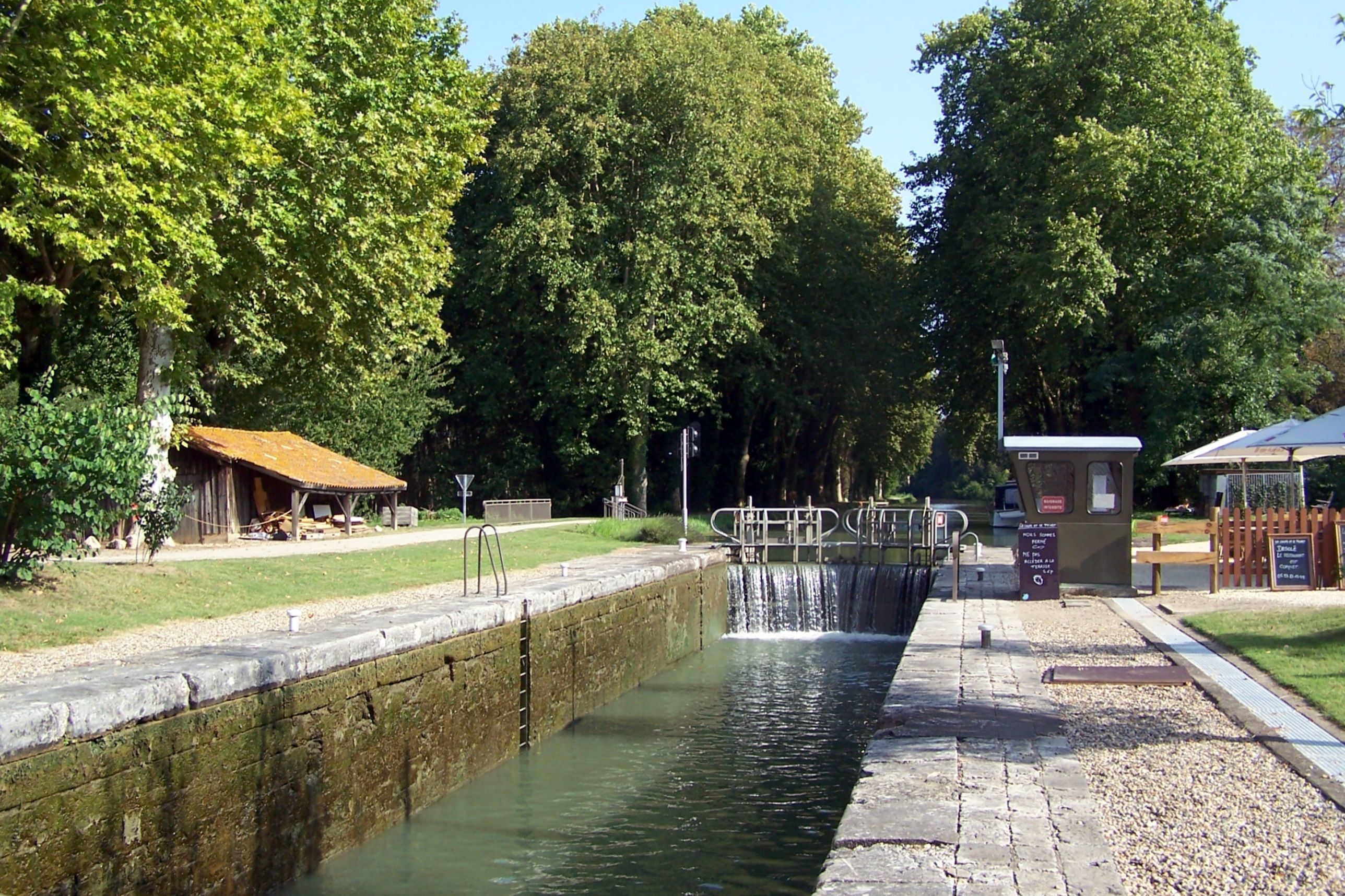
- Lock No. 42 at Villeton
- Location of Villeton
- Location within France Location within Nouvelle-Aquitaine
- Coordinates: 44°21′47″N 0°16′21″E
- Country: France
- Region: Nouvelle-Aquitaine
- Department: Lot-et-Garonne
- Arrondissement: Marmande
- Canton: Les Forêts de Gascogne
- Intercommunality: Val de Garonne Agglomération

Government
  - Mayor (2020–2026): Alain Dalla Maria
- Area^{1}: 10.24 km^{2} (3.95 sq mi)
- Highest elevation: 43 m (141 ft)
- Lowest elevation: 22 m (72 ft)
- Population (2023): 475
  - Density: 46.4/km^{2} (120/sq mi)
- Time zone: UTC+01:00 (CET)
  - Summer (DST): UTC+02:00 (CEST)
- INSEE/Postal code: 47325 /47400
- ^{1} French Land Register data, which excludes lakes, ponds, glaciers > 1 km^{2} (0.386 sq mi or 247 acres) and river estuaries.

Villeton (French pronunciation: [viltɔ̃]; Occitan: Vilaton) is a commune in the Lot-et-Garonne department in south-western France.

== See also ==
- Communes of the Lot-et-Garonne department
