= La Réunion, Lot-et-Garonne =

La Réunion
- Commune
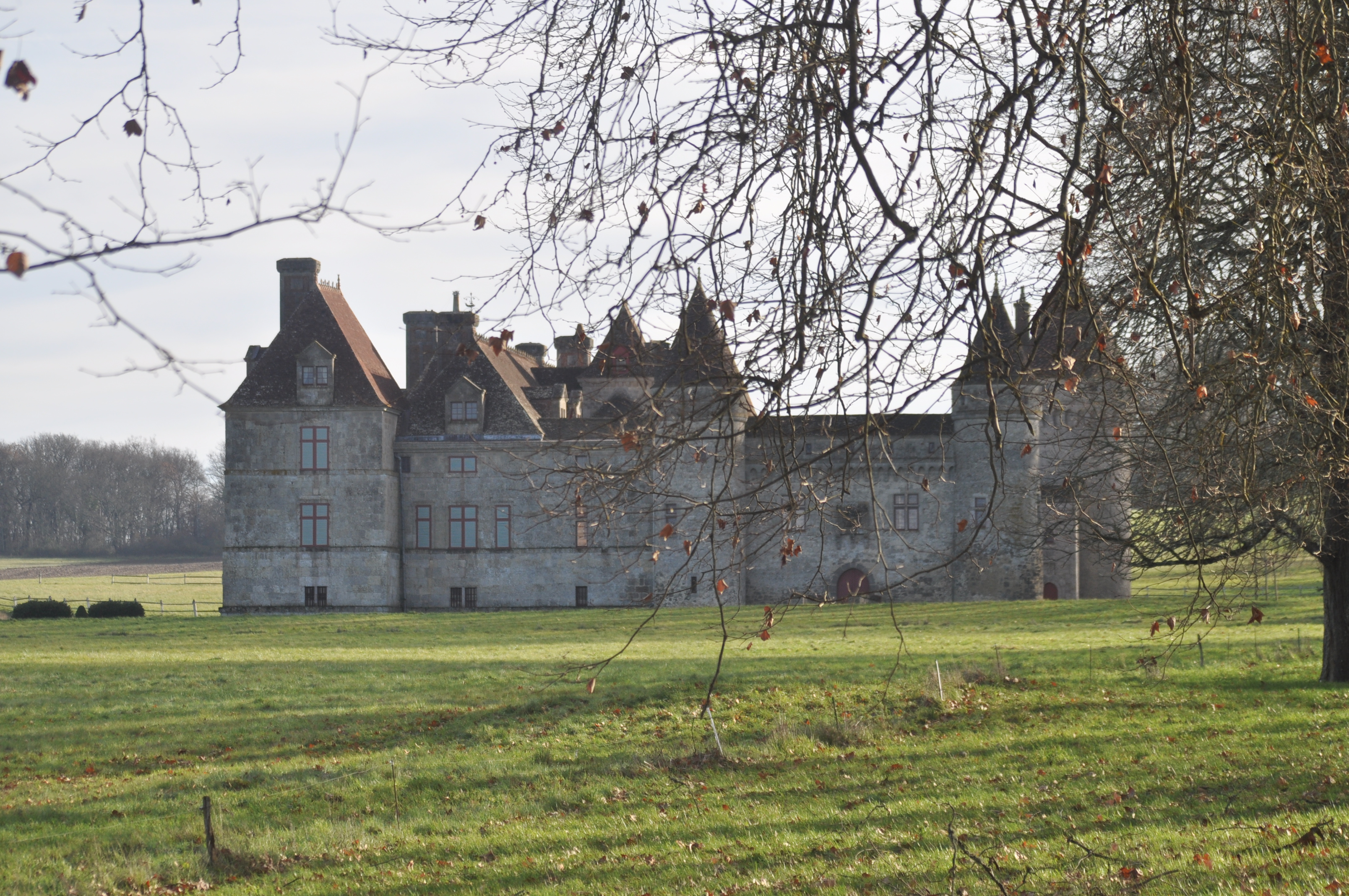
- Château du Sendat
- Location of La Réunion
- Location within France Location within Nouvelle-Aquitaine
- Coordinates: 44°17′54″N 0°07′07″E
- Country: France
- Region: Nouvelle-Aquitaine
- Department: Lot-et-Garonne
- Arrondissement: Nérac
- Canton: Les Forêts de Gascogne
- Intercommunality: CC Coteaux et Landes de Gascogne

Government
  - Mayor (2020–2026): Bruno Galichon
- Area^{1}: 28.06 km^{2} (10.83 sq mi)
- Elevation: 100 m (330 ft)
- Highest elevation: 172 m (564 ft)
- Lowest elevation: 78 m (256 ft)
- Population (2023): 524
  - Density: 18.7/km^{2} (48.4/sq mi)
- Time zone: UTC+01:00 (CET)
  - Summer (DST): UTC+02:00 (CEST)
- INSEE/Postal code: 47222 /47700
- ^{1} French Land Register data, which excludes lakes, ponds, glaciers > 1 km^{2} (0.386 sq mi or 247 acres) and river estuaries.

La Réunion (French pronunciation: [la ʁeynjɔ̃]; Occitan: La Reunion) is a commune in the Lot-et-Garonne department in south-western France.

== See also ==
- Communes of the Lot-et-Garonne department
