= Ruffiac, Lot-et-Garonne =

Ruffiac
- Commune
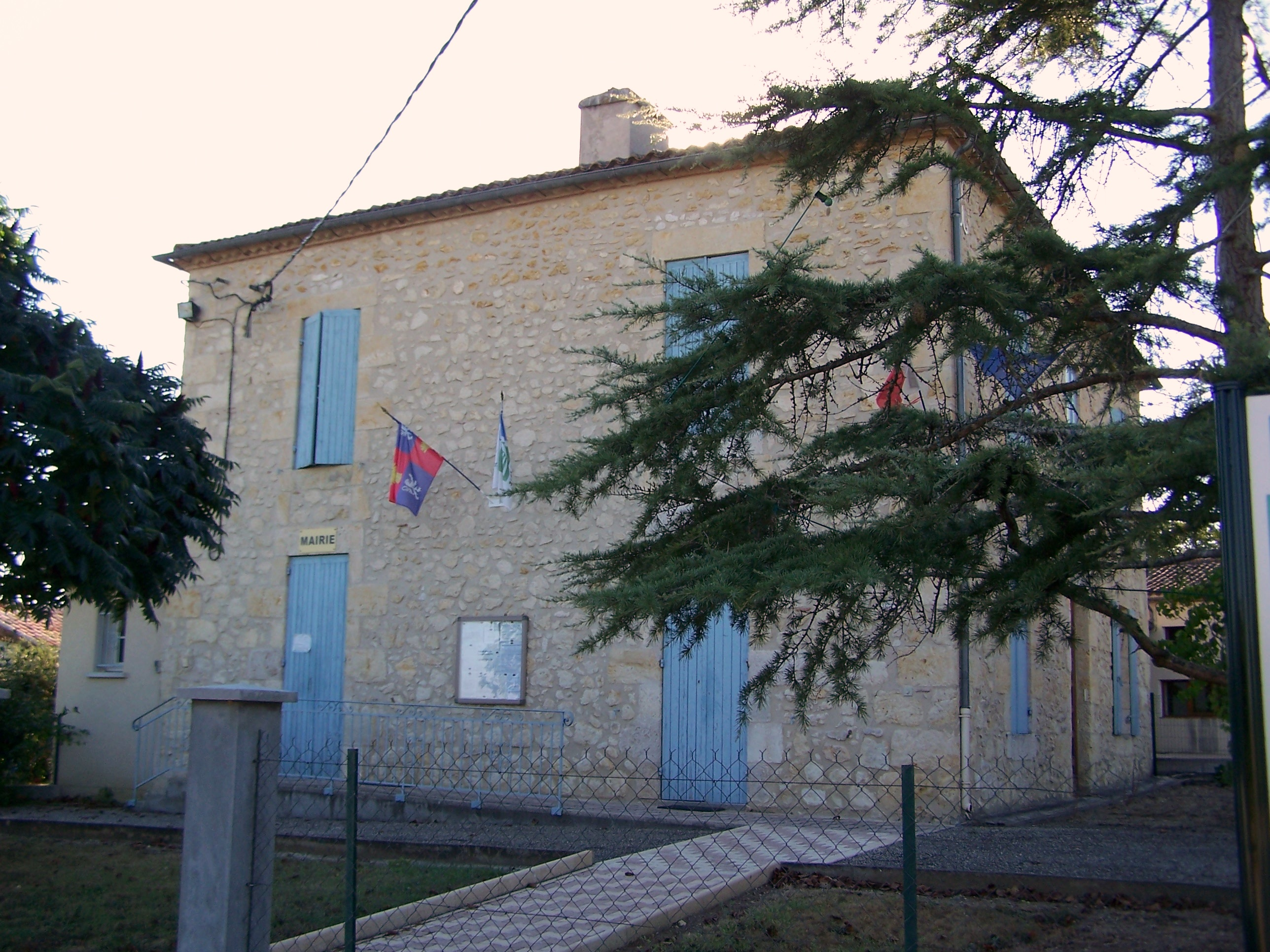
- The town hall in Ruffiac
- Location of Ruffiac
- Location within France Location within Nouvelle-Aquitaine
- Coordinates: 44°21′55″N 0°01′54″E
- Country: France
- Region: Nouvelle-Aquitaine
- Department: Lot-et-Garonne
- Arrondissement: Marmande
- Canton: Les Forêts de Gascogne
- Intercommunality: CC Coteaux et Landes de Gascogne

Government
  - Mayor (2020–2026): Didier Le Jallé
- Area^{1}: 12.84 km^{2} (4.96 sq mi)
- Elevation: 54 m (177 ft)
- Population (2023): 179
  - Density: 13.9/km^{2} (36.1/sq mi)
- Time zone: UTC+01:00 (CET)
  - Summer (DST): UTC+02:00 (CEST)
- INSEE/Postal code: 47227 /47700
- ^{1} French Land Register data, which excludes lakes, ponds, glaciers > 1 km^{2} (0.386 sq mi or 247 acres) and river estuaries.

Ruffiac (French pronunciation: [ʁyfjak]; Occitan: Rufiac) is a commune in the Lot-et-Garonne department in south-western France.

== History ==
The population of Volgelsheim (Haut-Rhin) was moved to the town and the neighboring Antagnac September 1939 to June 1940, a width of 10 km from the Rhine area were evacuated to make room for French armies. There is a street named Volgelsheim Street in Ruffiac.

In January 1973, Ruffiac was merged with the neighbor Antagnac. In March 2001, the two communes were separated again.

== Demography ==
In 2021, the town had 180 inhabitants.

== See also ==
- Communes of the Lot-et-Garonne department
