= Antagnac =

- Commune
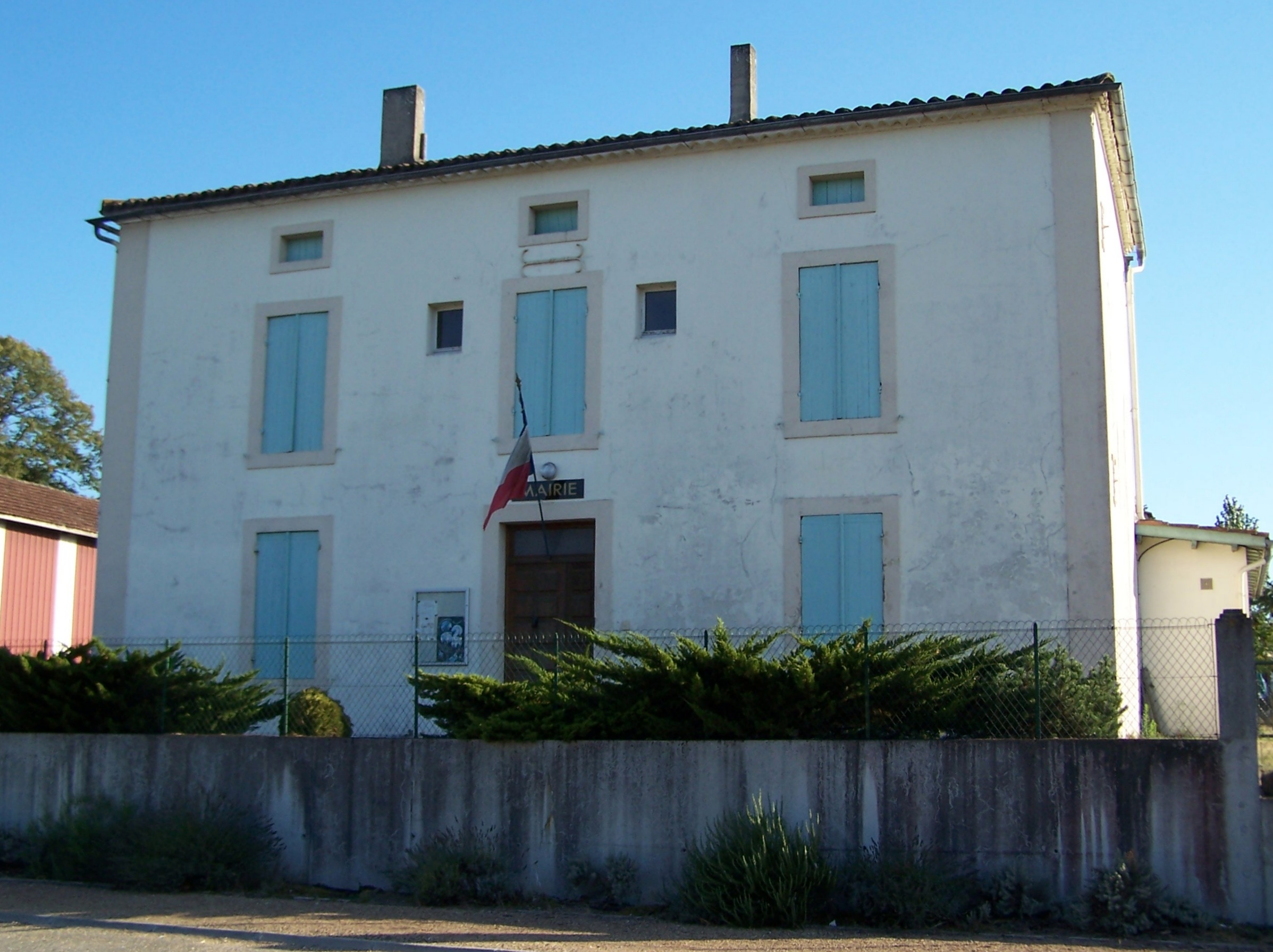
- The town hall in Antagnac
- Location of Antagnac
- Location within France Location within Nouvelle-Aquitaine
- Coordinates: 44°21′13″N 0°00′34″E
- Country: France
- Region: Nouvelle-Aquitaine
- Department: Lot-et-Garonne
- Arrondissement: Marmande
- Canton: Les Forêts de Gascogne
- Intercommunality: Coteaux et Landes de Gascogne

Government
  - Mayor (2020–2026): Jérémie Bezos
- Area^{1}: 22.15 km^{2} (8.55 sq mi)
- Elevation: 147 m (482 ft)
- Highest elevation: 168 m (551 ft)
- Lowest elevation: 59 m (194 ft)
- Population (2023): 223
  - Density: 10.1/km^{2} (26.1/sq mi)
- Time zone: UTC+01:00 (CET)
  - Summer (DST): UTC+02:00 (CEST)
- INSEE/Postal code: 47010 /47700
- ^{1} French Land Register data, which excludes lakes, ponds, glaciers > 1 km^{2} (0.386 sq mi or 247 acres) and river estuaries.

Antagnac (French pronunciation: [ɑ̃taɲak]; Occitan: Antanhac) is a commune in the Lot-et-Garonne department in southwestern France.

== Population ==
Historical population
Year	Pop.	±% p.a.
1968	219	—
1975	205	−0.94%
1982	207	+0.14%
1990	190	−1.07%
1999	184	−0.36%
2007	211	+1.73%
2012	231	+1.83%
2017	231	+0.00%
2023	223	−0.59%
Source: INSEE

== See also ==
- Communes of the Lot-et-Garonne department
