= Guérin, Lot-et-Garonne =

Guérin
- Commune
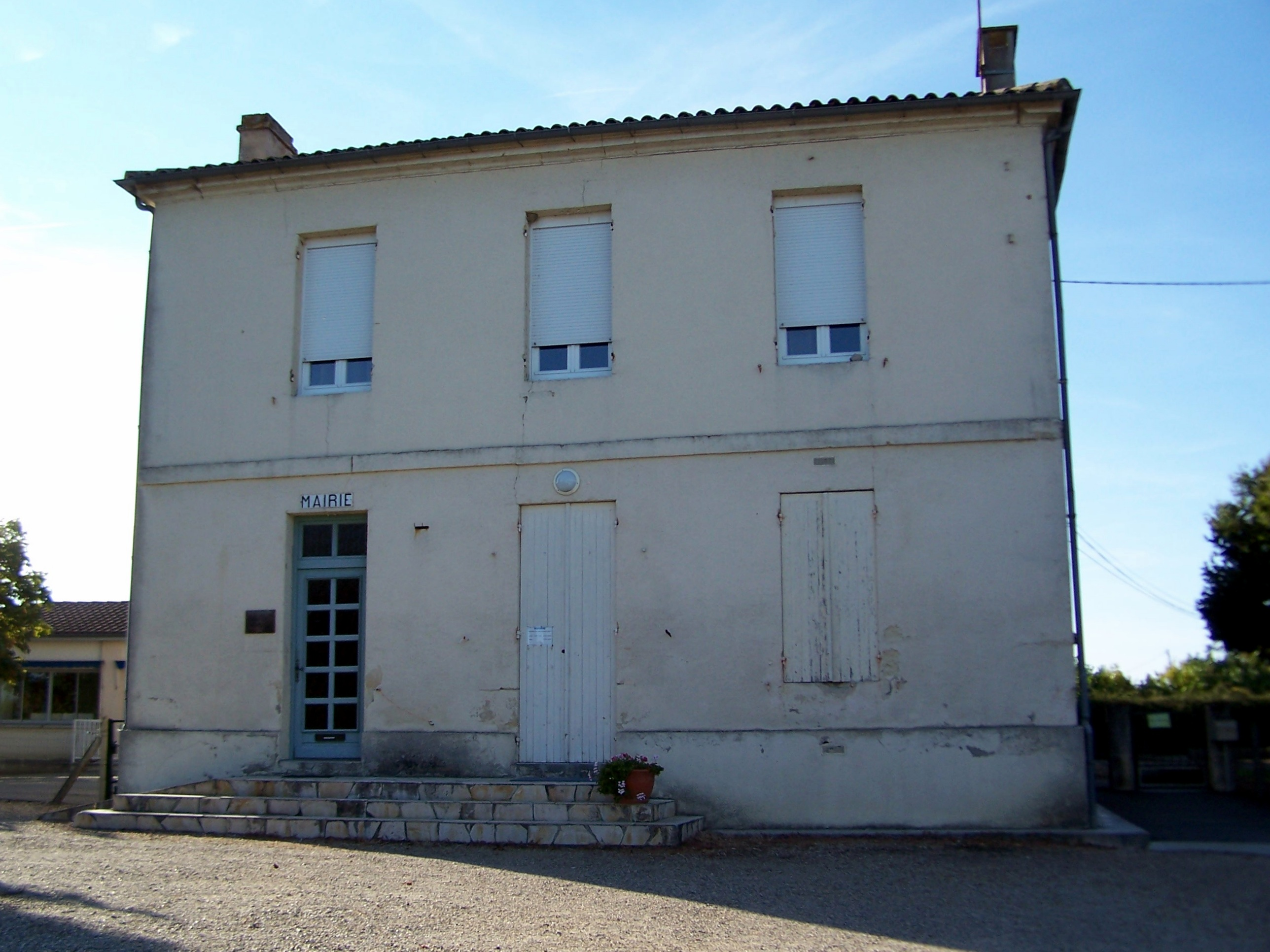
- The town hall in Guérin
- Location of Guérin
- Location within France Location within Nouvelle-Aquitaine
- Coordinates: 44°24′38″N 0°04′11″E
- Country: France
- Region: Nouvelle-Aquitaine
- Department: Lot-et-Garonne
- Arrondissement: Marmande
- Canton: Les Forêts de Gascogne
- Intercommunality: CC Coteaux et Landes de Gascogne

Government
  - Mayor (2020–2026): Marjorie Lassus
- Area^{1}: 10.43 km^{2} (4.03 sq mi)
- Elevation: 145 m (476 ft)
- Highest elevation: 146 m (479 ft)
- Lowest elevation: 57 m (187 ft)
- Population (2023): 246
  - Density: 23.6/km^{2} (61.1/sq mi)
- Time zone: UTC+01:00 (CET)
  - Summer (DST): UTC+02:00 (CEST)
- INSEE/Postal code: 47115 /47250
- ^{1} French Land Register data, which excludes lakes, ponds, glaciers > 1 km^{2} (0.386 sq mi or 247 acres) and river estuaries.

Guérin (French pronunciation: [ɡeʁɛ̃]; Occitan: Garin) is a commune in the Lot-et-Garonne department in south-western France.

== See also ==
- Communes of the Lot-et-Garonne department
