= Douzains =

Commune in the Lot-et-Garonne, France

- Commune
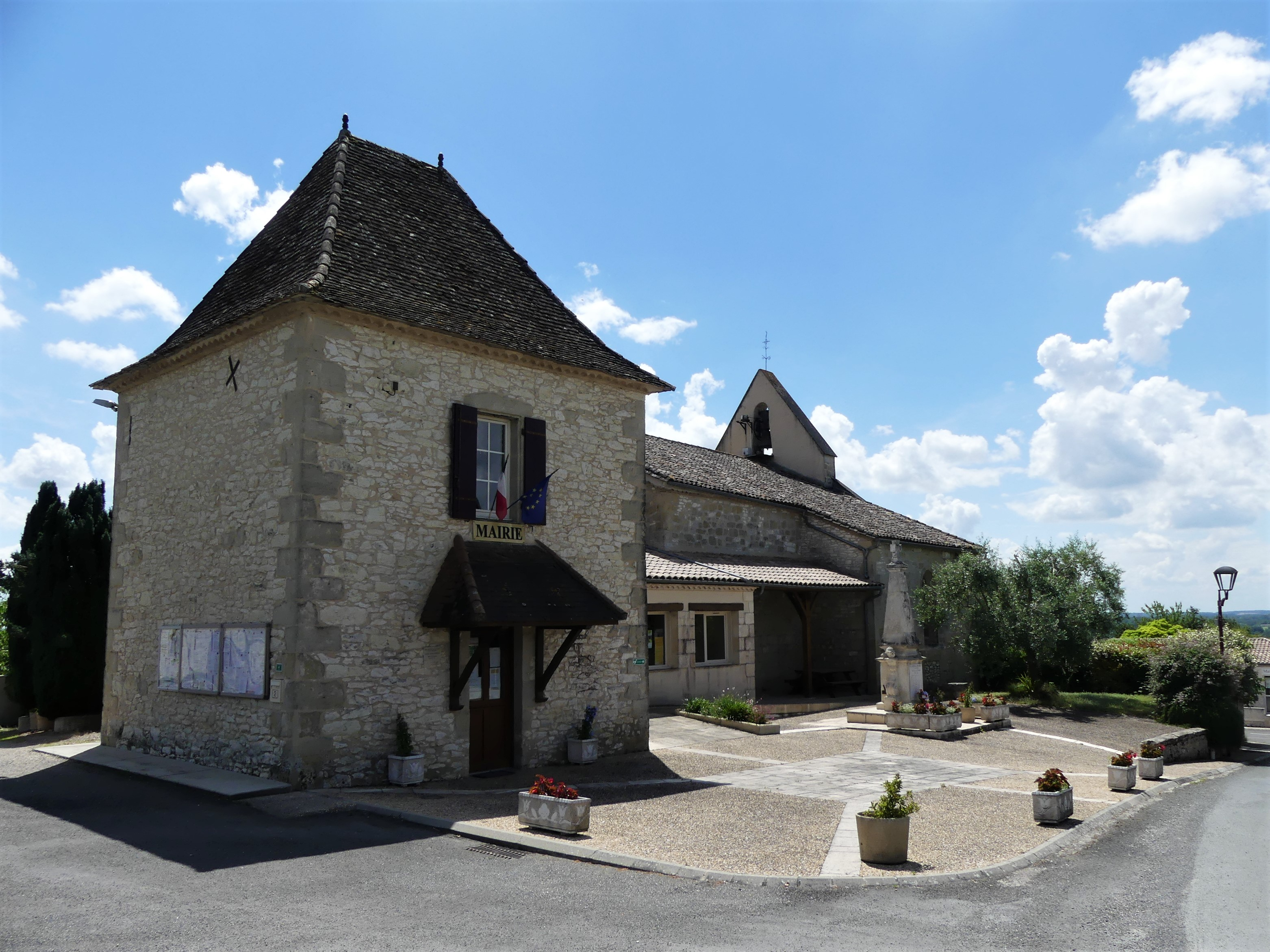
- Douzains Town hall
- Location of Douzains
- Location within France Location within Nouvelle-Aquitaine
- Coordinates: 44°38′06″N 0°32′24″E
- Country: France
- Region: Nouvelle-Aquitaine
- Department: Lot-et-Garonne
- Arrondissement: Villeneuve-sur-Lot
- Canton: Le Val du Dropt
- Intercommunality: CC des Bastides en Haut-Agenais Périgord

Government
  - Mayor (2020–2026): Jean-Pierre Dauta
- Area^{1}: 12.66 km^{2} (4.89 sq mi)
- Elevation: 126 m (413 ft)
- Highest elevation: 151 m (495 ft)
- Lowest elevation: 65 m (213 ft)
- Population (2023): 255
  - Density: 20.1/km^{2} (52.2/sq mi)
- Time zone: UTC+01:00 (CET)
  - Summer (DST): UTC+02:00 (CEST)
- INSEE/Postal code: 47084 /47330
- ^{1} French Land Register data, which excludes lakes, ponds, glaciers > 1 km^{2} (0.386 sq mi or 247 acres) and river estuaries.

Douzains (Occitan: Dosens) is a commune in the Lot-et-Garonne, a department in the Nouvelle-Aquitaine ("New Aquitaine") region in south-western France. Douzains is located 48 km north of Agen, the capital of the department Lot-et-Garonne. The nearest town with amenities is Castillonnès, 5.5 km away.

== See also ==
- Communes of the Lot-et-Garonne department
