= Montignac-de-Lauzun =

- Commune
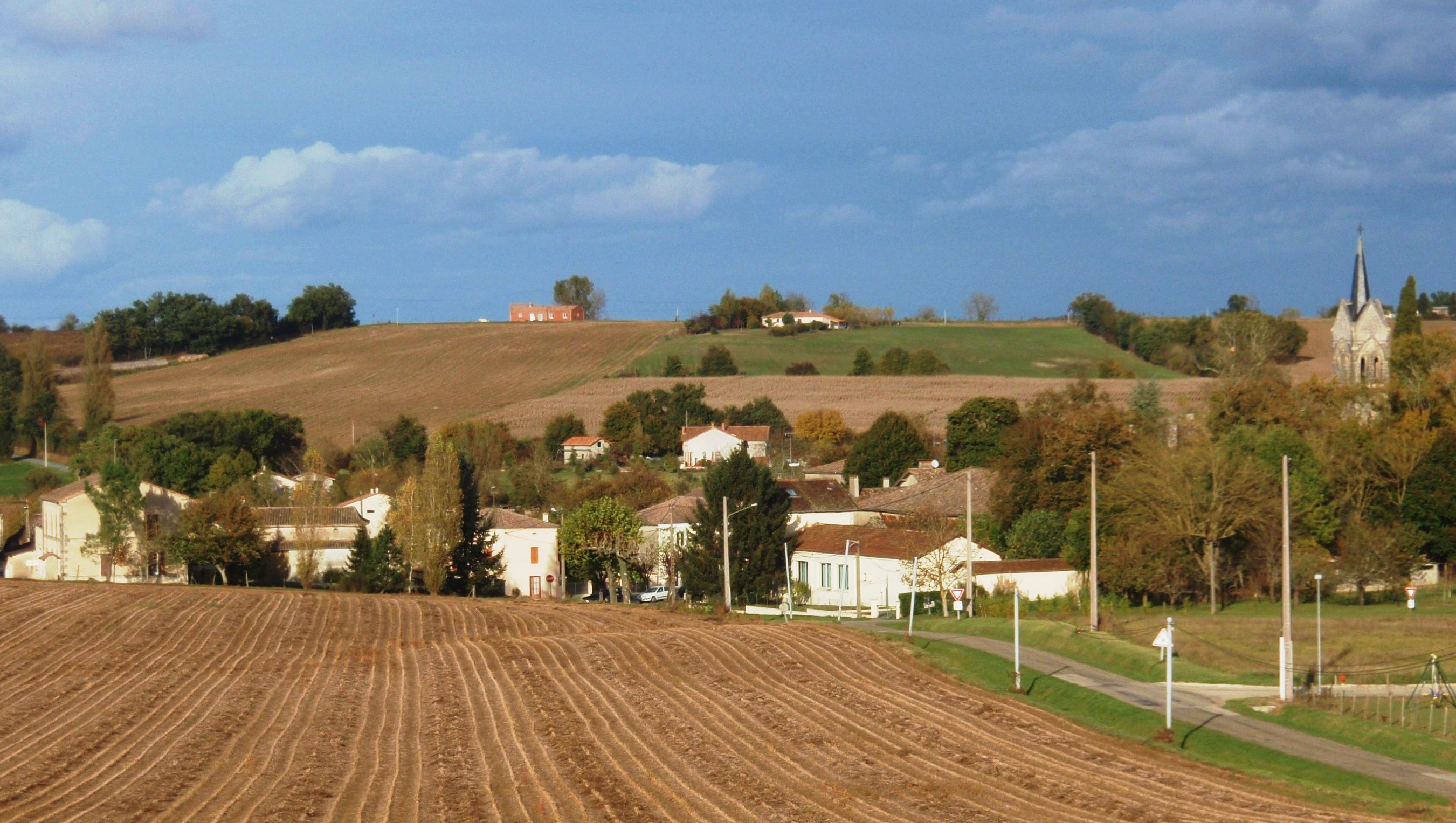
- A general view of Montignac-de-Lauzun
- Location of Montignac-de-Lauzun
- Location within France Location within Nouvelle-Aquitaine
- Coordinates: 44°34′27″N 0°27′53″E
- Country: France
- Region: Nouvelle-Aquitaine
- Department: Lot-et-Garonne
- Arrondissement: Marmande
- Canton: Le Val du Dropt
- Intercommunality: CC Pays de Lauzun

Government
  - Mayor (2020–2026): Jean-Marie Lenzi
- Area^{1}: 20.46 km^{2} (7.90 sq mi)
- Elevation: 190 m (620 ft)
- Highest elevation: 147 m (482 ft)
- Lowest elevation: 61 m (200 ft)
- Population (2023): 286
  - Density: 14.0/km^{2} (36.2/sq mi)
- Time zone: UTC+01:00 (CET)
  - Summer (DST): UTC+02:00 (CEST)
- INSEE/Postal code: 47188 /47800
- ^{1} French Land Register data, which excludes lakes, ponds, glaciers > 1 km^{2} (0.386 sq mi or 247 acres) and river estuaries.

Montignac-de-Lauzun (French pronunciation: [mɔ̃tiɲak də lozœ̃], literally Montignac of Lauzun; Occitan: Montinhac de Lausun) is a commune in the Lot-et-Garonne department in south-western France.

== See also ==
- Communes of the Lot-et-Garonne department
