= Ségalas =

Ségalas may refer to the following places in France:

- Ségalas, Lot-et-Garonne, a commune in the Lot-et-Garonne department
- Ségalas, Hautes-Pyrénées, a commune in the Hautes-Pyrénées department
