= Bourgougnague =

- Commune
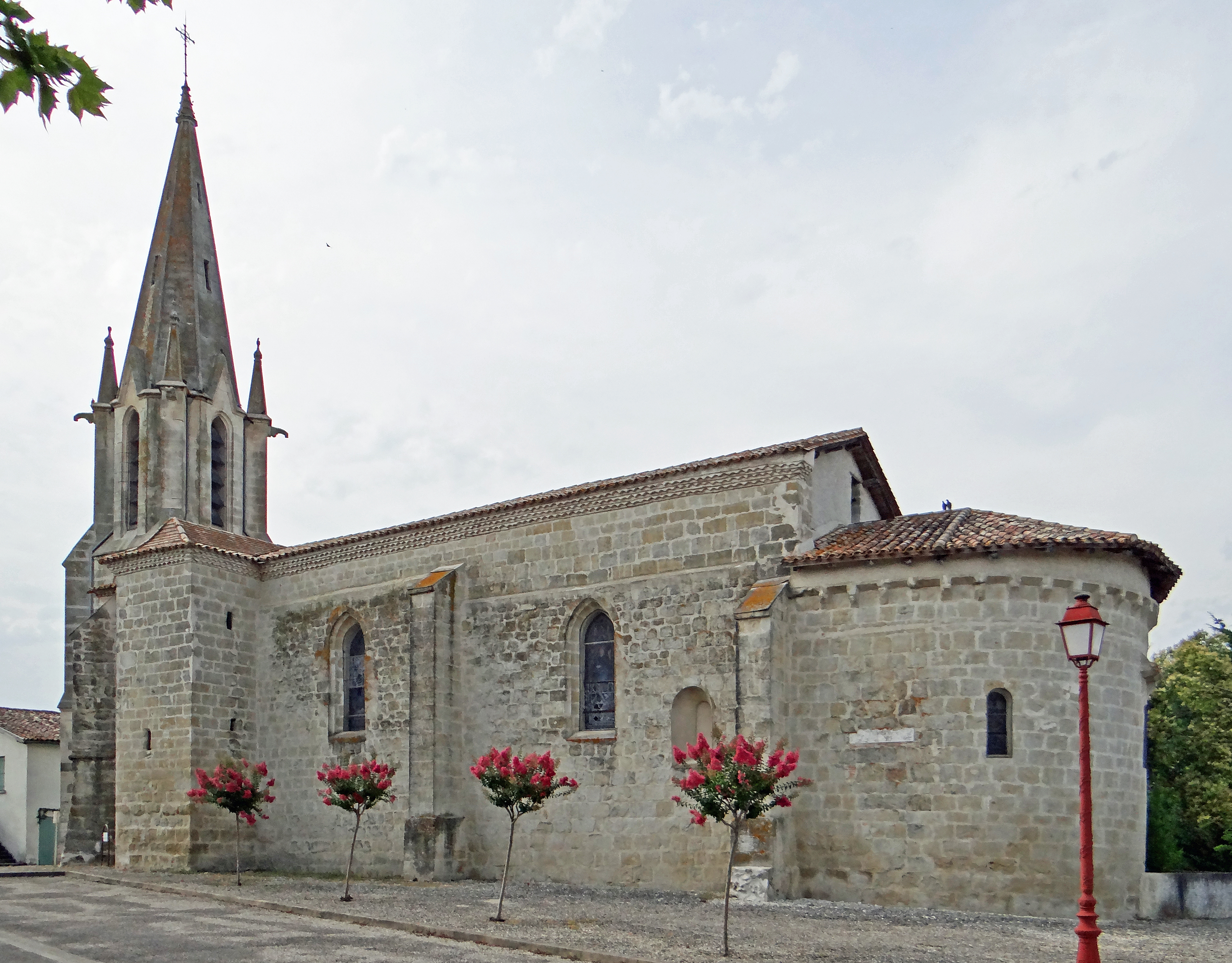
- The church in Bourgougnague
- Location of Bourgougnague
- Location within France Location within Nouvelle-Aquitaine
- Coordinates: 44°37′03″N 0°25′02″E
- Country: France
- Region: Nouvelle-Aquitaine
- Department: Lot-et-Garonne
- Arrondissement: Marmande
- Canton: Le Val du Dropt
- Intercommunality: Pays de Lauzun

Government
  - Mayor (2020–2026): Jean-Marie Constantin
- Area^{1}: 11.73 km^{2} (4.53 sq mi)
- Elevation: 125 m (410 ft)
- Highest elevation: 131 m (430 ft)
- Lowest elevation: 53 m (174 ft)
- Population (2023): 285
  - Density: 24.3/km^{2} (62.9/sq mi)
- Time zone: UTC+01:00 (CET)
  - Summer (DST): UTC+02:00 (CEST)
- INSEE/Postal code: 47035 /47410
- ^{1} French Land Register data, which excludes lakes, ponds, glaciers > 1 km^{2} (0.386 sq mi or 247 acres) and river estuaries.

Bourgougnague (French pronunciation: [buʁɡuɲaɡ]; Occitan: Bergonhagas) is a commune in the Lot-et-Garonne department in southwestern France.

== Population ==
Historical population
| Year | Pop. | ±% p.a. |
|---|---|---|
| 1968 | 239 | — |
| 1975 | 224 | −0.92% |
| 1982 | 254 | +1.81% |
| 1990 | 256 | +0.10% |
| 1999 | 233 | −1.04% |
| 2007 | 276 | +2.14% |
| 2012 | 263 | −0.96% |
| 2017 | 321 | +4.07% |
| 2023 | 285 | −1.96% |
Source: INSEE

== History ==
From the 4th century AD, barbarians swept into the Gallic Empire. In the 5th century, the Germanic peoples and Burgundians settled in the area. The town owes its name to these people: the pronunciation in Germanic gave "Burgundiaca" meaning "field of the Burgundians."

== Sites and Monuments ==
- The Church of Our Lady of Bourgougnague (Église Notre-Dame de Bourgougnague) from the 13th century. The choir was painted before World War II by the Italian painter Giovanni Masutti, from Stevana in the Treviso region.
- The Church of St. Lawrence (Église de Saint-Laurent).
- Jolibert Castle (Château de Jolibert) which houses the first of the Rural Family Homes (Maison familiale rurale - an association devoted to educate young people) in Europe.
- The manor of the great moor with its chapel dating from the 16th century. This area is a dependency of the Lauzun castle but was also a hunting reserve of King Henry IV.

== See also ==
- Communes of the Lot-et-Garonne department
