= Cahuzac =

Cahuzac is the name or part of the name of the following communes in France:

- Cahuzac, Aude, in the Aude department
- Cahuzac, Lot-et-Garonne, in the Lot-et-Garonne department
- Cahuzac, Tarn, in the Tarn department
- Cahuzac-sur-Adour, in the Gers department
- Cahuzac-sur-Vère, in the Tarn department

People named Cahuzac:

- Jérôme Cahuzac, French cosmetic surgeon and politician
- Louis Cahuzac, French clarinetist and composer
- Pierre Cahuzac, French professional football player
- Yannick Cahuzac, French professional football player

See also

- Louis de Cahusac (1706–1759), French playwright and librettist, fellow worker of the composer Jean-Philippe Rameau.
