= Ferrensac =

- Commune
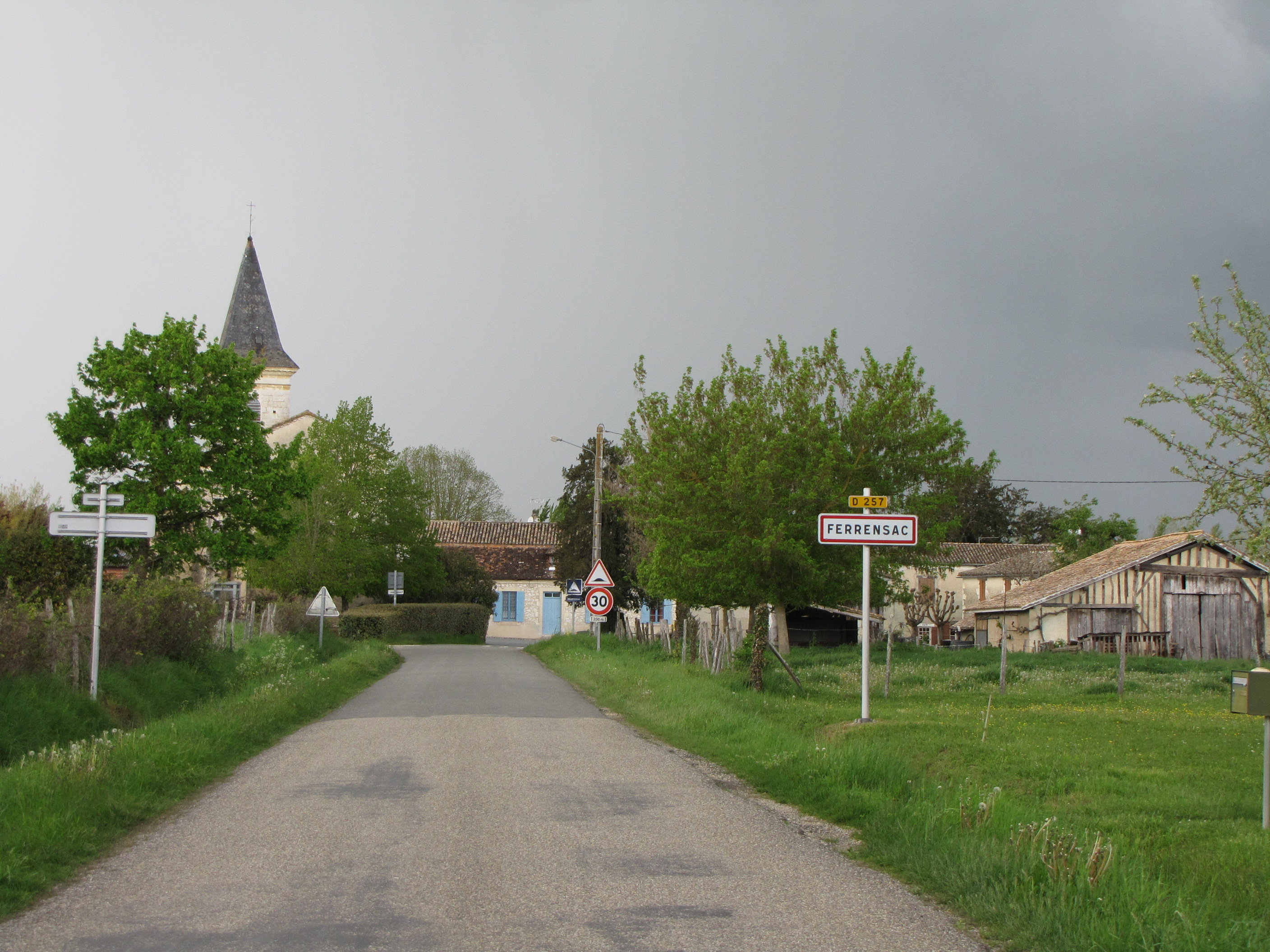
- The road into Ferrensac
- Location of Ferrensac
- Location within France Location within Nouvelle-Aquitaine
- Coordinates: 44°38′32″N 0°37′56″E
- Country: France
- Region: Nouvelle-Aquitaine
- Department: Lot-et-Garonne
- Arrondissement: Villeneuve-sur-Lot
- Canton: Le Val du Dropt

Government
  - Mayor (2020–2026): Jean-Pierre Paillé
- Area^{1}: 12.32 km^{2} (4.76 sq mi)
- Elevation: 77 m (253 ft)
- Highest elevation: 151 m (495 ft)
- Lowest elevation: 65 m (213 ft)
- Population (2023): 205
  - Density: 16.6/km^{2} (43.1/sq mi)
- Time zone: UTC+01:00 (CET)
  - Summer (DST): UTC+02:00 (CEST)
- INSEE/Postal code: 47096 /47330
- ^{1} French Land Register data, which excludes lakes, ponds, glaciers > 1 km^{2} (0.386 sq mi or 247 acres) and river estuaries.

Ferrensac (French pronunciation: [fɛʁɑ̃sak]; Languedocien: Ferrançac) is a commune in the Lot-et-Garonne department in south-western France.

== See also ==
- Communes of the Lot-et-Garonne department
