= Lougratte =

- Commune
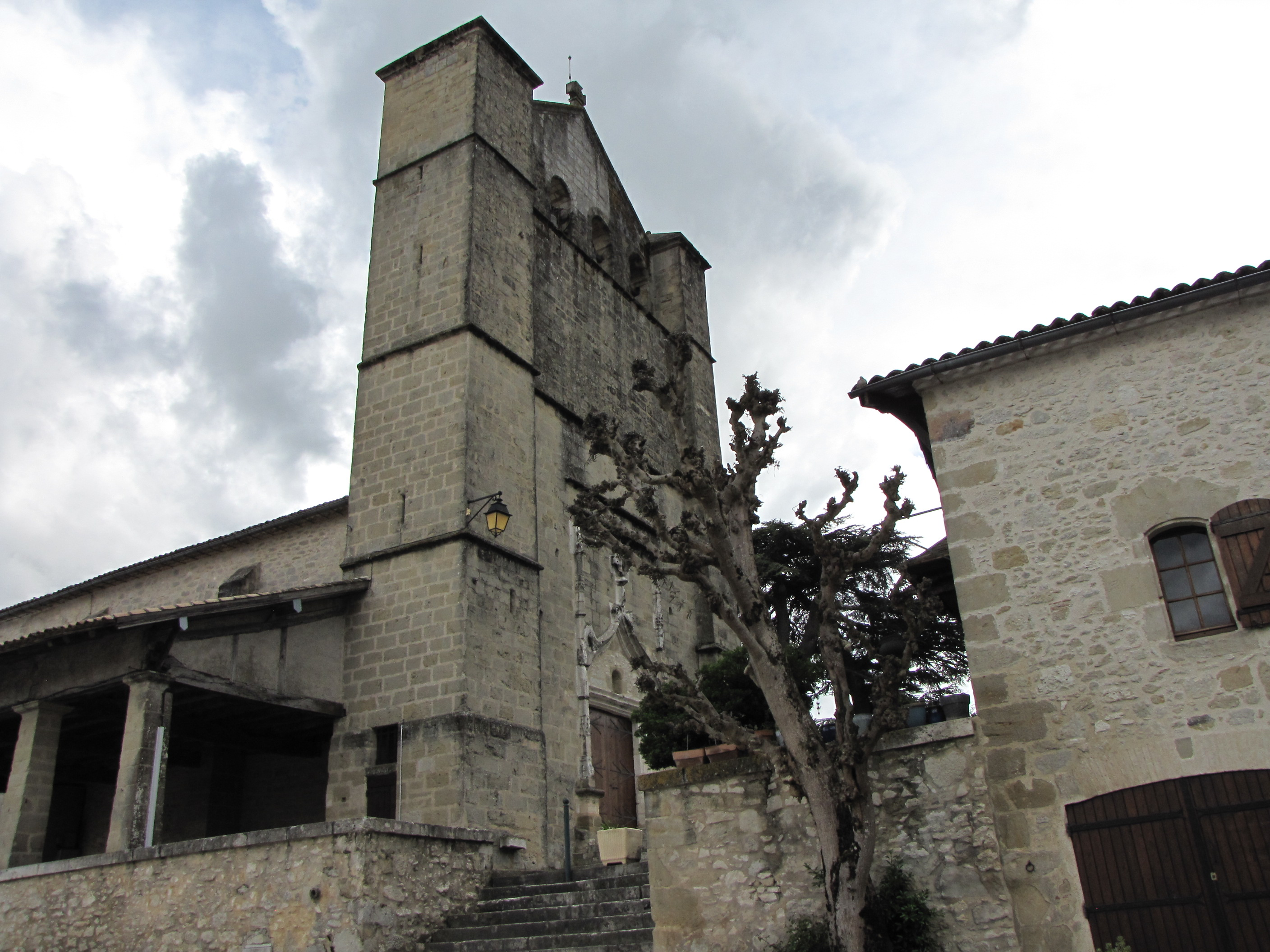
- The church in Lougratte
- Location of Lougratte
- Location within France Location within Nouvelle-Aquitaine
- Coordinates: 44°35′04″N 0°37′28″E
- Country: France
- Region: Nouvelle-Aquitaine
- Department: Lot-et-Garonne
- Arrondissement: Villeneuve-sur-Lot
- Canton: Le Val du Dropt

Government
  - Mayor (2020–2026): Isabelle Labonne
- Area^{1}: 20.45 km^{2} (7.90 sq mi)
- Elevation: 80 m (260 ft)
- Highest elevation: 183 m (600 ft)
- Lowest elevation: 82 m (269 ft)
- Population (2023): 421
  - Density: 20.6/km^{2} (53.3/sq mi)
- Time zone: UTC+01:00 (CET)
  - Summer (DST): UTC+02:00 (CEST)
- INSEE/Postal code: 47152 /47290
- ^{1} French Land Register data, which excludes lakes, ponds, glaciers > 1 km^{2} (0.386 sq mi or 247 acres) and river estuaries.

Lougratte (French pronunciation: [luɡʁat]; Occitan: Lograta) is a commune and a village in the Lot-et-Garonne department in south-western France.

== See also ==
- Communes of the Lot-et-Garonne department
