= Saint-Quentin-du-Dropt =

- Commune
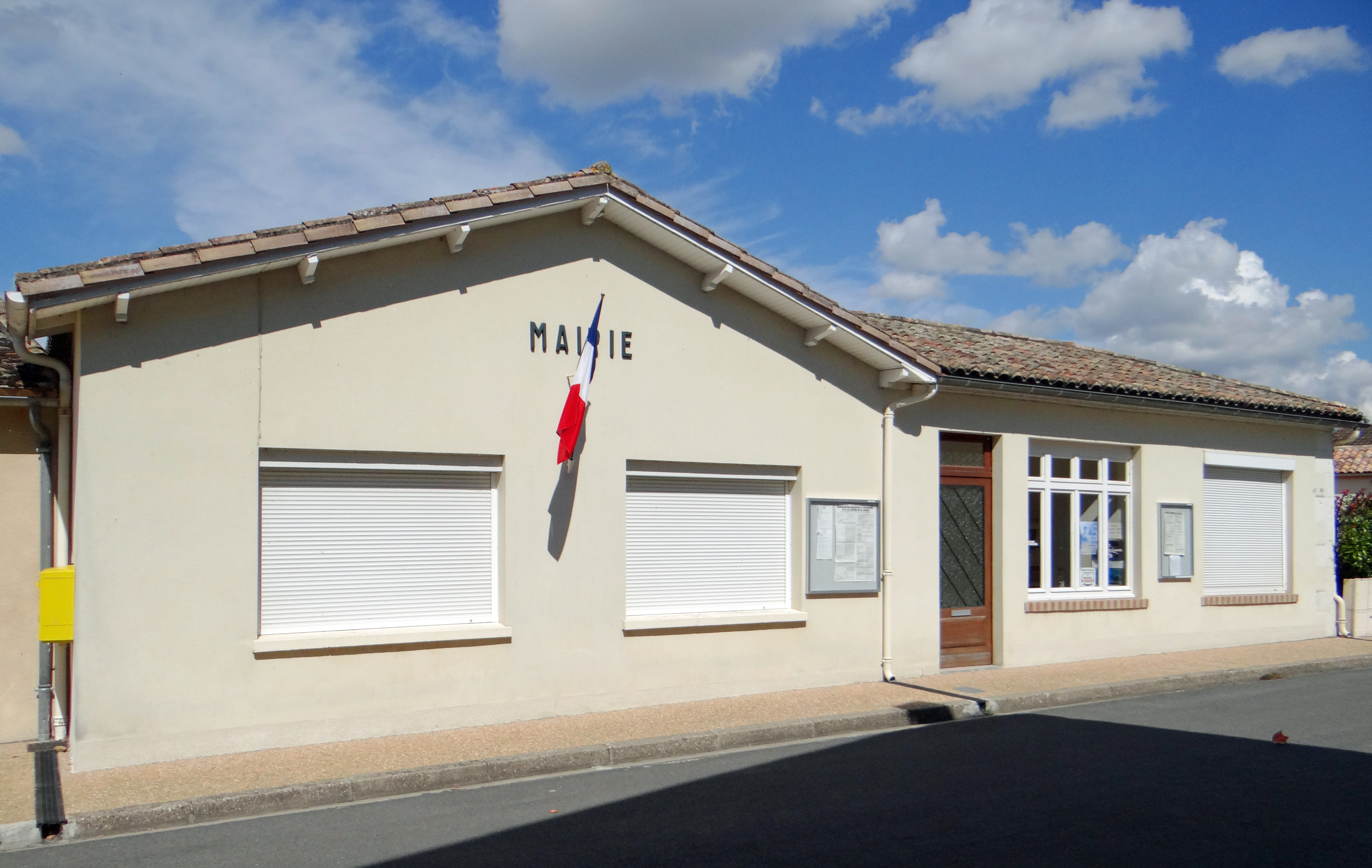
- The town hall in Saint-Quentin-du-Dropt
- Location of Saint-Quentin-du-Dropt
- Location within France Location within Nouvelle-Aquitaine
- Coordinates: 44°41′07″N 0°36′03″E
- Country: France
- Region: Nouvelle-Aquitaine
- Department: Lot-et-Garonne
- Arrondissement: Villeneuve-sur-Lot
- Canton: Le Val du Dropt

Government
  - Mayor (2020–2026): Frédéric Perletti
- Area^{1}: 11.9 km^{2} (4.6 sq mi)
- Elevation: 120 m (390 ft)
- Highest elevation: 127 m (417 ft)
- Lowest elevation: 61 m (200 ft)
- Population (2023): 180
  - Density: 15/km^{2} (39/sq mi)
- Time zone: UTC+01:00 (CET)
  - Summer (DST): UTC+02:00 (CEST)
- INSEE/Postal code: 47272 /47330
- ^{1} French Land Register data, which excludes lakes, ponds, glaciers > 1 km^{2} (0.386 sq mi or 247 acres) and river estuaries.

Saint-Quentin-du-Dropt (French pronunciation: [sɛ̃ kɑ̃tɛ̃ dy dʁo], literally Saint-Quentin of the Dropt; Languedocien: Sent Quentin de Dròt) is a commune in the Lot-et-Garonne department in south-western France.

== See also ==
- Communes of the Lot-et-Garonne department
