= Sérignac-Péboudou =

- Commune
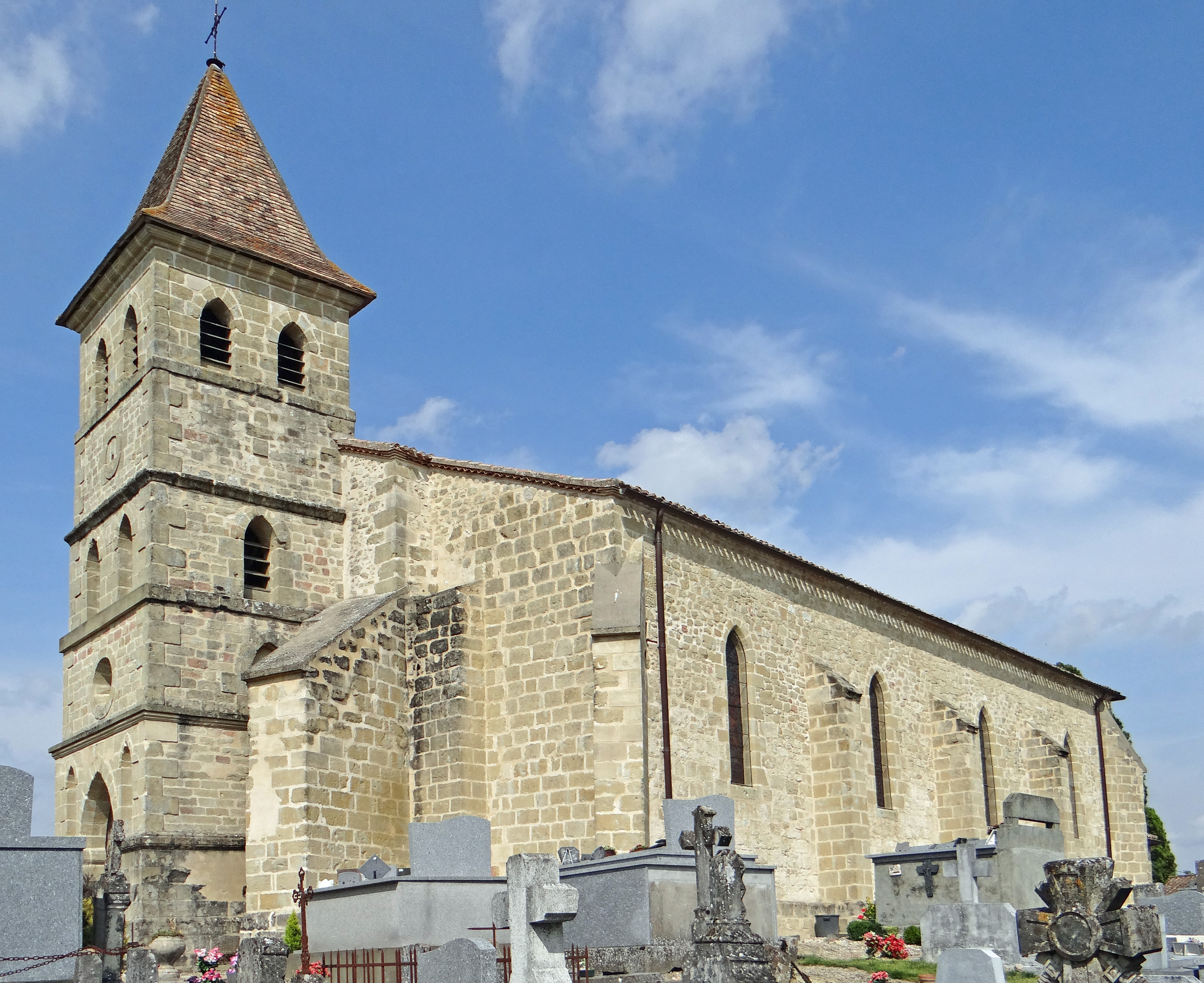
- The church in Sérignac

- Coat of arms
- Location of Sérignac-Péboudou
- Location within France Location within Nouvelle-Aquitaine
- Coordinates: 44°36′56″N 0°32′27″E
- Country: France
- Region: Nouvelle-Aquitaine
- Department: Lot-et-Garonne
- Arrondissement: Villeneuve-sur-Lot
- Canton: Le Val du Dropt

Government
  - Mayor (2020–2026): Guy Peyrat
- Area^{1}: 12.12 km^{2} (4.68 sq mi)
- Elevation: 148 m (486 ft)
- Highest elevation: 185 m (607 ft)
- Lowest elevation: 69 m (226 ft)
- Population (2023): 178
  - Density: 14.7/km^{2} (38.0/sq mi)
- Time zone: UTC+01:00 (CET)
  - Summer (DST): UTC+02:00 (CEST)
- INSEE/Postal code: 47299 /47410
- ^{1} French Land Register data, which excludes lakes, ponds, glaciers > 1 km^{2} (0.386 sq mi or 247 acres) and river estuaries.

Sérignac-Péboudou (French pronunciation: [seʁiɲak pebudu]; Occitan: Serinhac del Puègbodon) is a commune in the Lot-et-Garonne department in south-western France.

== See also ==
- Communes of the Lot-et-Garonne department
