= Lalandusse =

- Commune
- Location of Lalandusse
- Location within France Location within Nouvelle-Aquitaine
- Coordinates: 44°39′27″N 0°31′54″E
- Country: France
- Region: Nouvelle-Aquitaine
- Department: Lot-et-Garonne
- Arrondissement: Villeneuve-sur-Lot
- Canton: Le Val du Dropt

Government
  - Mayor (2020–2026): Christian Dieudonné
- Area^{1}: 9.37 km^{2} (3.62 sq mi)
- Elevation: 126 m (413 ft)
- Highest elevation: 143 m (469 ft)
- Lowest elevation: 56 m (184 ft)
- Population (2023): 219
  - Density: 23.4/km^{2} (60.5/sq mi)
- Time zone: UTC+01:00 (CET)
  - Summer (DST): UTC+02:00 (CEST)
- INSEE/Postal code: 47132 /47330
- ^{1} French Land Register data, which excludes lakes, ponds, glaciers > 1 km^{2} (0.386 sq mi or 247 acres) and river estuaries.

Lalandusse (French pronunciation: [lalɑ̃dys]; Occitan: La Landussa) is a commune in the Lot-et-Garonne department in south-western France. It is around 20 km south of Bergerac. It has 224 inhabitants (2019).

== See also ==
- Communes of the Lot-et-Garonne department
