= Agnac =

- Commune
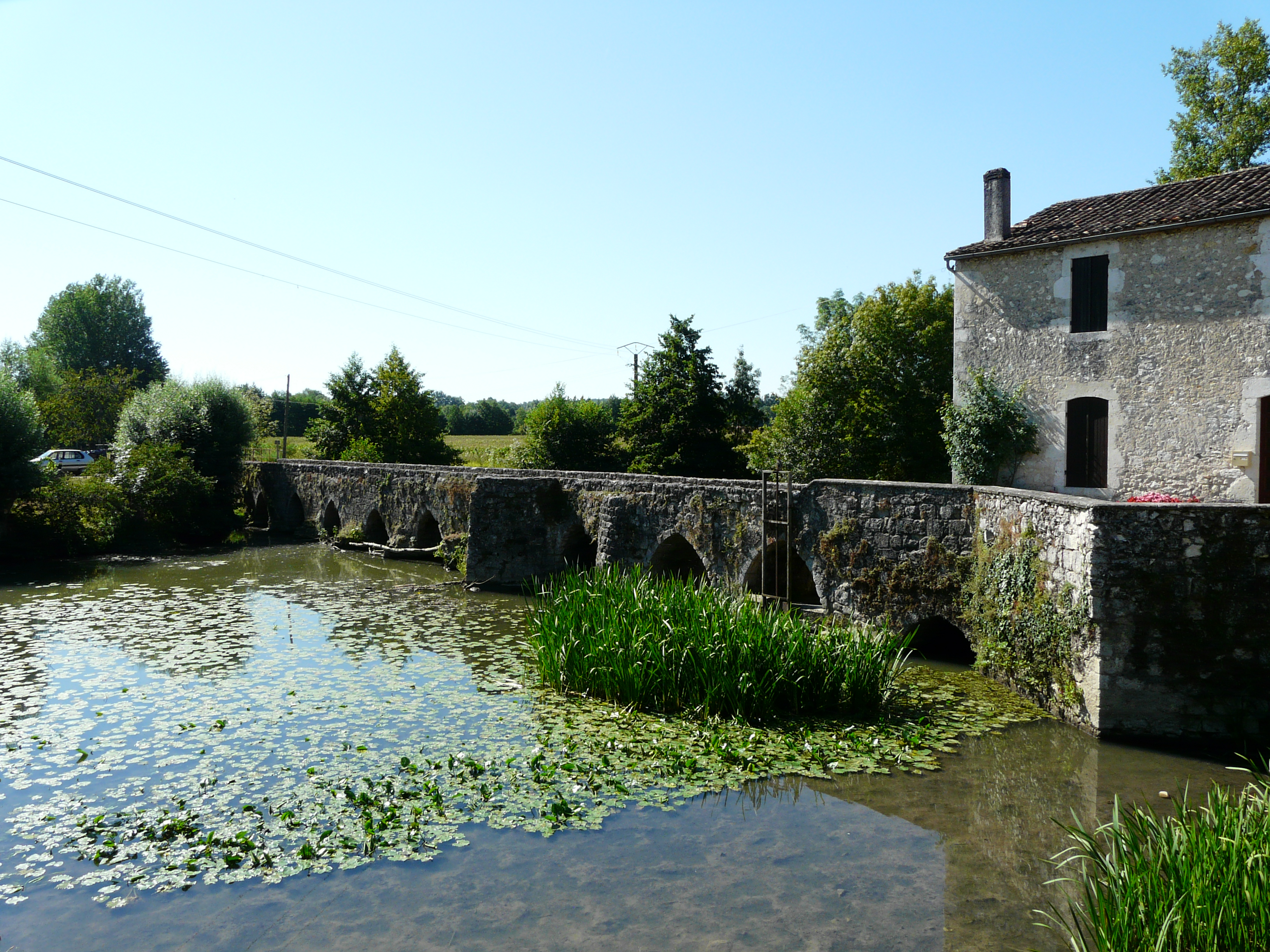
- The old bridge in Agnac
- Location of Agnac
- Location within France Location within Nouvelle-Aquitaine
- Coordinates: 44°38′36″N 0°23′13″E
- Country: France
- Region: Nouvelle-Aquitaine
- Department: Lot-et-Garonne
- Arrondissement: Marmande
- Canton: Le Val du Dropt
- Intercommunality: Pays de Lauzun

Government
  - Mayor (2020–2026): Guillaume Pouliquen
- Area^{1}: 13.84 km^{2} (5.34 sq mi)
- Elevation: 56 m (184 ft)
- Highest elevation: 125 m (410 ft)
- Lowest elevation: 39 m (128 ft)
- Population (2023): 482
  - Density: 34.8/km^{2} (90.2/sq mi)
- Time zone: UTC+01:00 (CET)
  - Summer (DST): UTC+02:00 (CEST)
- INSEE/Postal code: 47003 /47800
- ^{1} French Land Register data, which excludes lakes, ponds, glaciers > 1 km^{2} (0.386 sq mi or 247 acres) and river estuaries.

Agnac (French pronunciation: [aɲak]; Occitan: Anhac) is a commune of the Lot-et-Garonne department in southwestern France.

== Population ==
Historical population
Year	Pop.	±% p.a.
1968	350	—
1975	367	+0.68%
1982	408	+1.52%
1990	381	−0.85%
1999	388	+0.20%
2007	405	+0.54%
2012	461	+2.62%
2017	422	−1.75%
2023	482	+2.24%
Source: INSEE

== See also ==
- Communes of the Lot-et-Garonne department
