= Cavarc =

- Commune
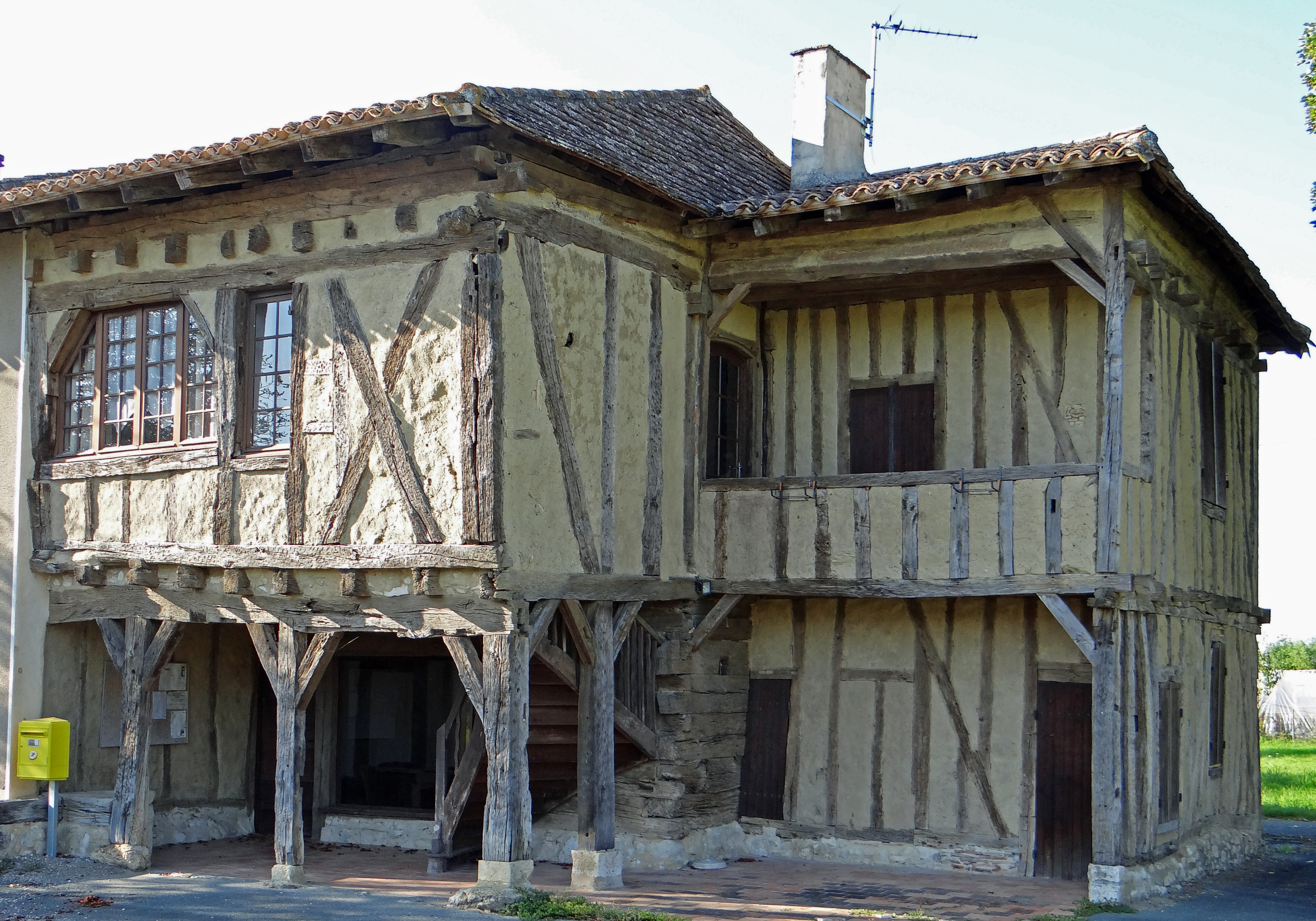
- A timbered house in Cavarc
- Location of Cavarc
- Location within France Location within Nouvelle-Aquitaine
- Coordinates: 44°41′27″N 0°38′32″E
- Country: France
- Region: Nouvelle-Aquitaine
- Department: Lot-et-Garonne
- Arrondissement: Villeneuve-sur-Lot
- Canton: Le Val du Dropt

Government
  - Mayor (2020–2026): Laurent Delpech
- Area^{1}: 11.99 km^{2} (4.63 sq mi)
- Elevation: 100 m (330 ft)
- Highest elevation: 143 m (469 ft)
- Lowest elevation: 67 m (220 ft)
- Population (2023): 155
  - Density: 12.9/km^{2} (33.5/sq mi)
- Time zone: UTC+01:00 (CET)
  - Summer (DST): UTC+02:00 (CEST)
- INSEE/Postal code: 47063 /47330
- ^{1} French Land Register data, which excludes lakes, ponds, glaciers > 1 km^{2} (0.386 sq mi or 247 acres) and river estuaries.

Cavarc (French pronunciation: [kavaʁk]) is a commune in the Lot-et-Garonne department in south-western France.

== See also ==
- Communes of the Lot-et-Garonne department
