= Raphaël Trémouilhe =

French politician

Raphaël Trémouilhe (27 January 1891 in Allemans-du-Dropt – 12 December 1978) was a French politician. He represented the Democratic and Socialist Union of the Resistance (UDSR) (from 1951 to 1955) and the Radical Party (1956 to 1958) in the National Assembly.
