= Roumagne =

Roumagne Romanha
- Commune
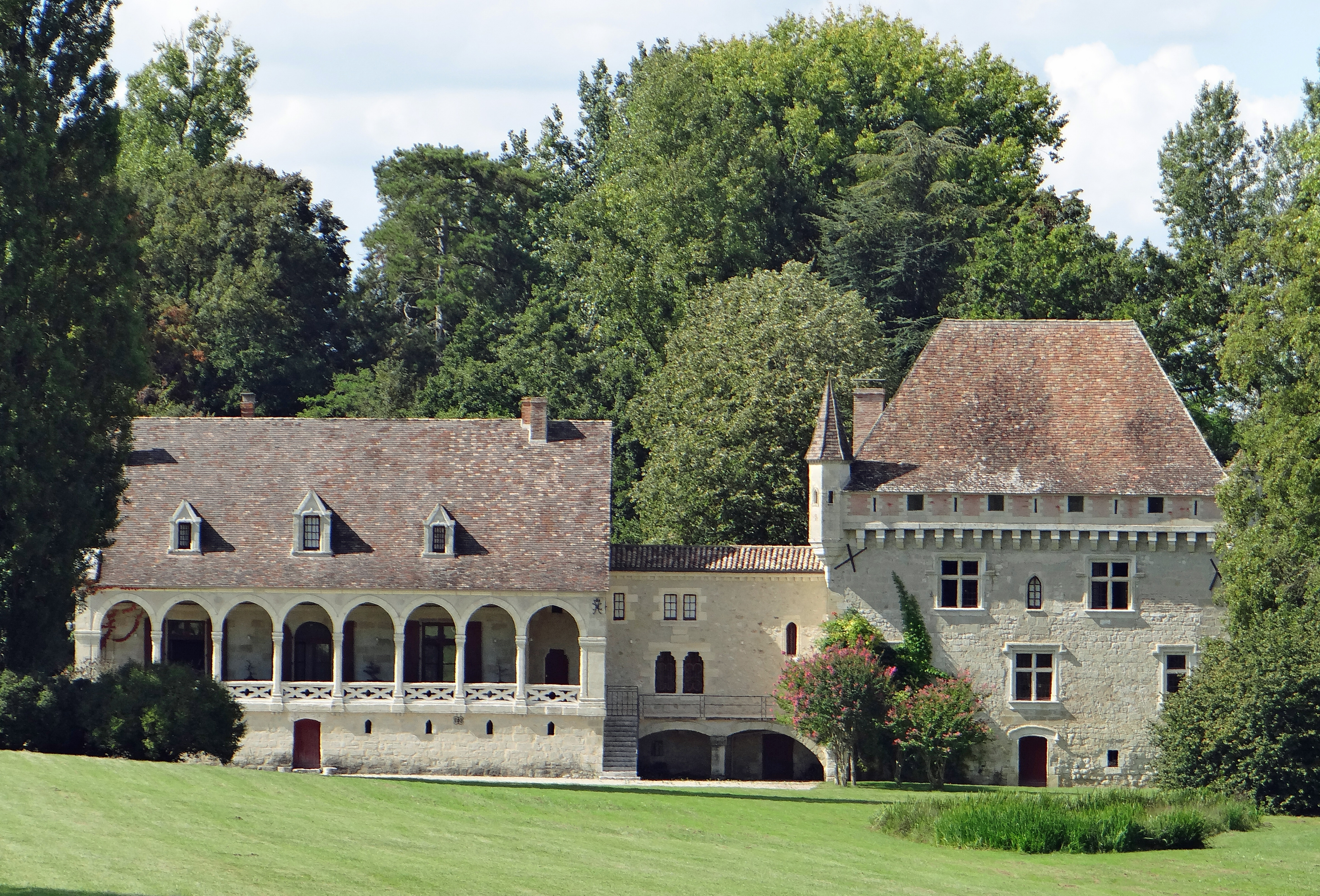
- The Château of Frémauret, in Roumagne

- Coat of arms
- Location of Roumagne
- Location within France Location within Nouvelle-Aquitaine
- Coordinates: 44°37′07″N 0°20′17″E
- Country: France
- Region: Nouvelle-Aquitaine
- Department: Lot-et-Garonne
- Arrondissement: Marmande
- Canton: Le Val du Dropt
- Intercommunality: CC du Pays de Lauzun

Government
  - Mayor (2020–2026): Eric Trellu
- Area^{1}: 10.54 km^{2} (4.07 sq mi)
- Elevation: 62 m (203 ft)
- Highest elevation: 115 m (377 ft)
- Lowest elevation: 35 m (115 ft)
- Population (2023): 539
  - Density: 51.1/km^{2} (132/sq mi)
- Time zone: UTC+01:00 (CET)
  - Summer (DST): UTC+02:00 (CEST)
- INSEE/Postal code: 47226 /47800
- ^{1} French Land Register data, which excludes lakes, ponds, glaciers > 1 km^{2} (0.386 sq mi or 247 acres) and river estuaries.

Roumagne (French pronunciation: [ʁumaɲ]; Occitan: Romanha) is a commune in the Lot-et-Garonne department in south-western France.

== See also ==
- Communes of the Lot-et-Garonne department
