= Puysserampion =

- Commune
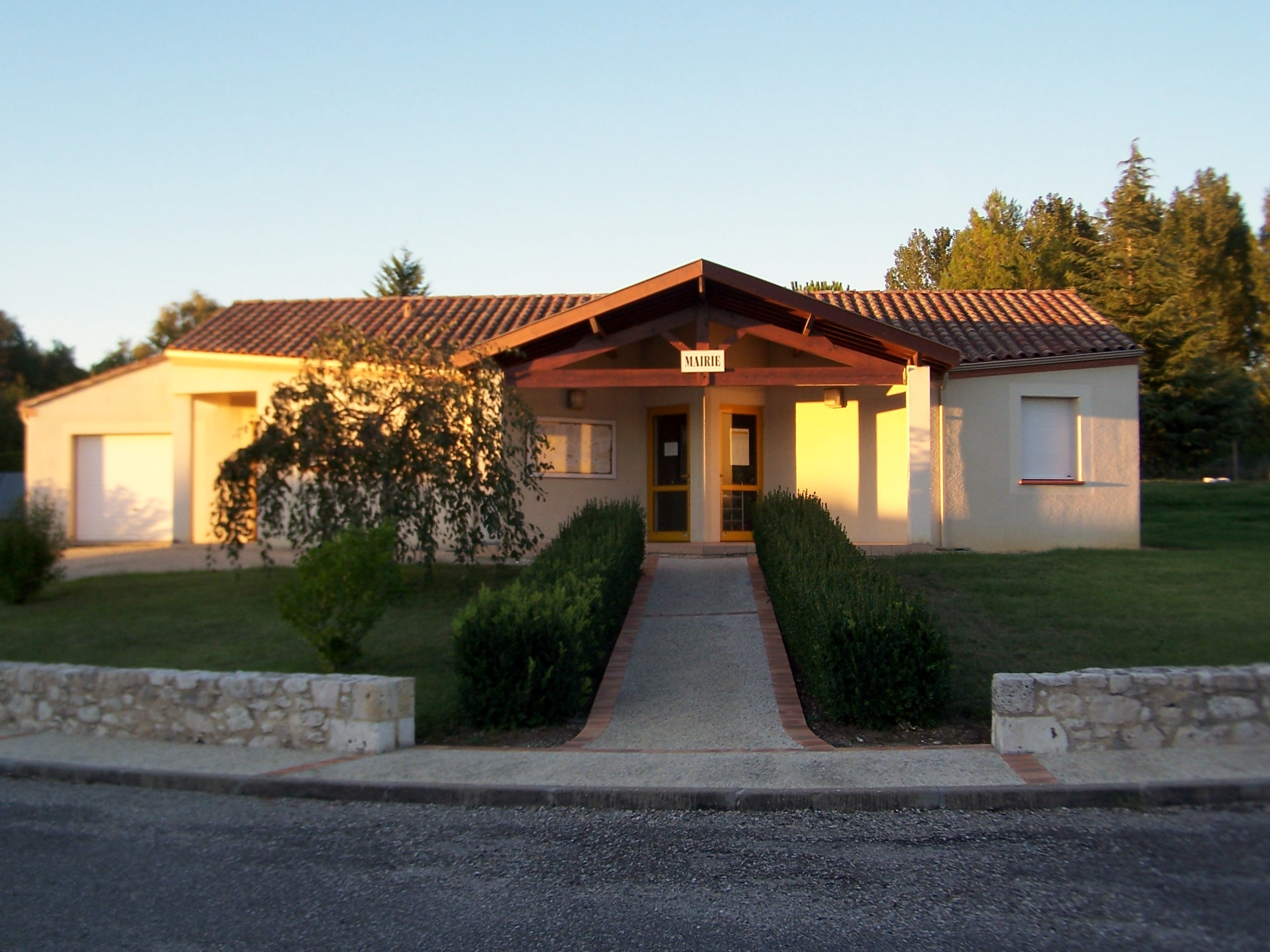
- Puysserampion Town hall
- Location of Puysserampion
- Location within France Location within Nouvelle-Aquitaine
- Coordinates: 44°36′15″N 0°18′33″E
- Country: France
- Region: Nouvelle-Aquitaine
- Department: Lot-et-Garonne
- Arrondissement: Marmande
- Canton: Le Val du Dropt

Government
  - Mayor (2020–2026): Christian Penot
- Area^{1}: 10.72 km^{2} (4.14 sq mi)
- Elevation: 68 m (223 ft)
- Highest elevation: 116 m (381 ft)
- Lowest elevation: 44 m (144 ft)
- Population (2023): 265
  - Density: 24.7/km^{2} (64.0/sq mi)
- Time zone: UTC+01:00 (CET)
  - Summer (DST): UTC+02:00 (CEST)
- INSEE/Postal code: 47218 /47800
- ^{1} French Land Register data, which excludes lakes, ponds, glaciers > 1 km^{2} (0.386 sq mi or 247 acres) and river estuaries.

Puysserampion (French pronunciation: [pɥisʁɑ̃pjɔ̃]; Occitan: Puèg Arampion) is a commune in the Lot-et-Garonne department in south-western France.

== See also ==
- Communes of the Lot-et-Garonne department
