= Canton of Le Val du Dropt =

Coordinates: 44.60°N 0.36°E

The canton of Le Val du Dropt is an administrative division of the Lot-et-Garonne department, southwestern France. It was created at the French canton reorganisation which came into effect in March 2015. Its seat is in Miramont-de-Guyenne.

It consists of the following communes:

1. Agnac
2. Allemans-du-Dropt
3. Armillac
4. Bourgougnague
5. Cahuzac
6. Castillonnès
7. Cavarc
8. Douzains
9. Ferrensac
10. Lalandusse
11. Laperche
12. Lauzun
13. Lavergne
14. Lougratte
15. Miramont-de-Guyenne
16. Montauriol
17. Montignac-de-Lauzun
18. Peyrière
19. Puysserampion
20. Roumagne
21. Saint-Colomb-de-Lauzun
22. Saint-Pardoux-Isaac
23. Saint-Quentin-du-Dropt
24. Ségalas
25. Sérignac-Péboudou
