= Montauriol, Lot-et-Garonne =

Montauriol
- Commune
- Location of Montauriol
- Location within France Location within Nouvelle-Aquitaine
- Coordinates: 44°37′07″N 0°34′53″E
- Country: France
- Region: Nouvelle-Aquitaine
- Department: Lot-et-Garonne
- Arrondissement: Villeneuve-sur-Lot
- Canton: Le Val du Dropt

Government
  - Mayor (2020–2026): Serge Lescombe
- Area^{1}: 9.92 km^{2} (3.83 sq mi)
- Elevation: 85 m (279 ft)
- Highest elevation: 152 m (499 ft)
- Lowest elevation: 74 m (243 ft)
- Population (2023): 226
  - Density: 22.8/km^{2} (59.0/sq mi)
- Time zone: UTC+01:00 (CET)
  - Summer (DST): UTC+02:00 (CEST)
- INSEE/Postal code: 47183 /47330
- ^{1} French Land Register data, which excludes lakes, ponds, glaciers > 1 km^{2} (0.386 sq mi or 247 acres) and river estuaries.

Montauriol (French pronunciation: [mɔ̃toʁjɔl]; Occitan: Montauriòl) is a commune in the Lot-et-Garonne department in south-western France.

== See also ==
- Communes of the Lot-et-Garonne department
