= Laperche =

- Commune
- Location of Laperche
- Location within France Location within Nouvelle-Aquitaine
- Coordinates: 44°32′24″N 0°24′54″E
- Country: France
- Region: Nouvelle-Aquitaine
- Department: Lot-et-Garonne
- Arrondissement: Marmande
- Canton: Le Val du Dropt
- Intercommunality: CC Pays de Lauzun

Government
  - Mayor (2020–2026): Mickaël Guern
- Area^{1}: 8.42 km^{2} (3.25 sq mi)
- Elevation: 55 m (180 ft)
- Highest elevation: 141 m (463 ft)
- Lowest elevation: 62 m (203 ft)
- Population (2023): 141
  - Density: 16.7/km^{2} (43.4/sq mi)
- Time zone: UTC+01:00 (CET)
  - Summer (DST): UTC+02:00 (CEST)
- INSEE/Postal code: 47136 /47800
- ^{1} French Land Register data, which excludes lakes, ponds, glaciers > 1 km^{2} (0.386 sq mi or 247 acres) and river estuaries.

Laperche (French pronunciation: [lapɛʁʃ]; Occitan: La Pèrcha) is a commune in the Lot-et-Garonne department in south-western France.

== See also ==
- Communes of the Lot-et-Garonne department
