= Armillac =

- Commune
- Location of Armillac
- Location within France Location within Nouvelle-Aquitaine
- Coordinates: 44°33′29″N 0°23′13″E
- Country: France
- Region: Nouvelle-Aquitaine
- Department: Lot-et-Garonne
- Arrondissement: Marmande
- Canton: Le Val du Dropt
- Intercommunality: CC Pays Lauzun

Government
  - Mayor (2020–2026): Daniel Baury
- Area^{1}: 7.77 km^{2} (3.00 sq mi)
- Elevation: 110 m (360 ft)
- Highest elevation: 139 m (456 ft)
- Lowest elevation: 60 m (200 ft)
- Population (2023): 209
  - Density: 26.9/km^{2} (69.7/sq mi)
- Time zone: UTC+01:00 (CET)
  - Summer (DST): UTC+02:00 (CEST)
- INSEE/Postal code: 47014 /47800
- ^{1} French Land Register data, which excludes lakes, ponds, glaciers > 1 km^{2} (0.386 sq mi or 247 acres) and river estuaries.

Armillac (French pronunciation: [aʁmijak]; Occitan: Armilhac) is a commune in the Lot-et-Garonne department in southwestern France.

== Population ==
Historical population
Year	Pop.	±% p.a.
1968	166	—
1975	148	−1.63%
1982	174	+2.34%
1990	151	−1.76%
1999	141	−0.76%
2007	163	+1.83%
2012	197	+3.86%
2017	198	+0.10%
2023	209	+0.91%
Source: INSEE

== See also ==
- Communes of the Lot-et-Garonne department
