= Allemans-du-Dropt =

- Commune
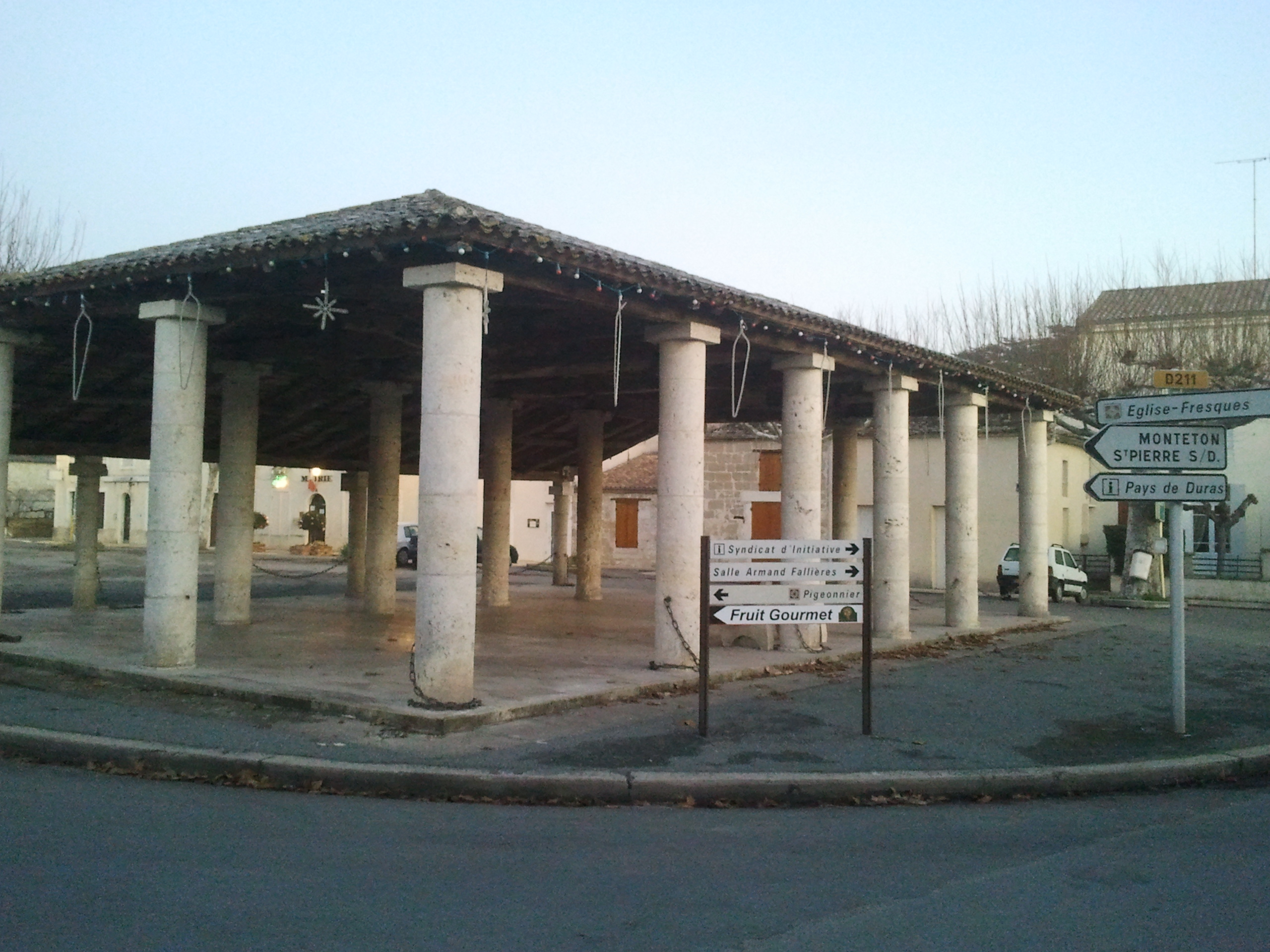
- The covered market in Allemans-du-Dropt

- Coat of arms
- Location of Allemans-du-Dropt
- Location within France Location within Nouvelle-Aquitaine
- Coordinates: 44°37′40″N 0°17′24″E
- Country: France
- Region: Nouvelle-Aquitaine
- Department: Lot-et-Garonne
- Arrondissement: Marmande
- Canton: Le Val du Dropt
- Intercommunality: Pays de Lauzun

Government
  - Mayor (2020–2026): Émilien Roso
- Area^{1}: 6.4 km^{2} (2.5 sq mi)
- Elevation: 42 m (138 ft)
- Highest elevation: 89 m (292 ft)
- Lowest elevation: 33 m (108 ft)
- Population (2023): 490
  - Density: 77/km^{2} (200/sq mi)
- Time zone: UTC+01:00 (CET)
  - Summer (DST): UTC+02:00 (CEST)
- INSEE/Postal code: 47005 /47800
- ^{1} French Land Register data, which excludes lakes, ponds, glaciers > 1 km^{2} (0.386 sq mi or 247 acres) and river estuaries.

Allemans-du-Dropt (French pronunciation: [almɑ̃ dy dʁo], literally Allemans of the Dropt; Occitan: Alamans de Dròt) is a commune of the Lot-et-Garonne department in southwestern France.

== Population ==
Historical population
Year	Pop.	±% p.a.
1968	537	—
1975	536	−0.03%
1982	455	−2.31%
1990	455	+0.00%
1999	447	−0.20%
2007	463	+0.44%
2012	509	+1.91%
2017	493	−0.64%
2023	490	−0.10%
Source: INSEE

== Notable people ==
- Raphaël Trémouilhe (1891–1978), politician

== See also ==
- Communes of the Lot-et-Garonne department
