= Peyrière =

- Commune
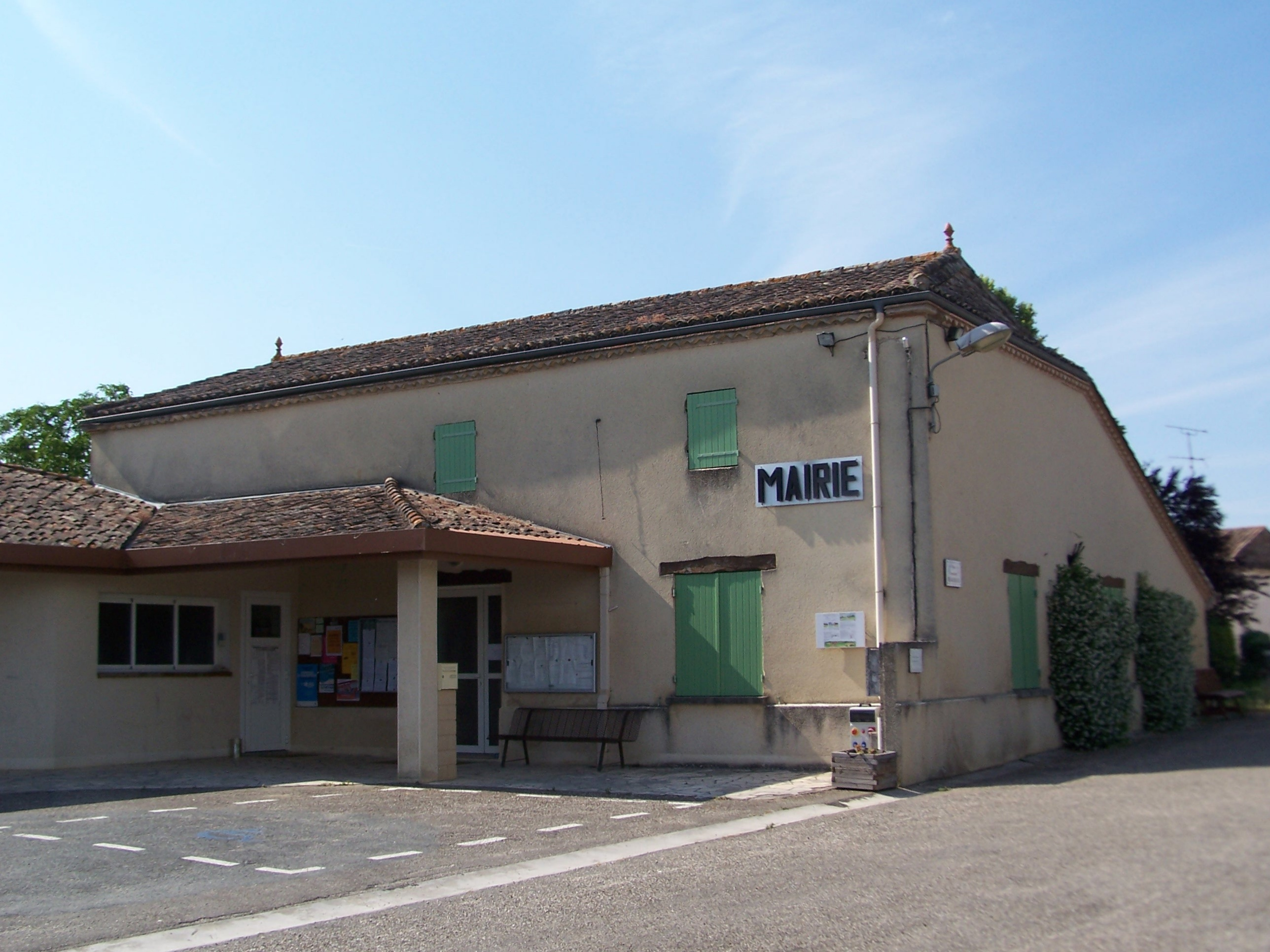
- Peyrière Town hall
- Location of Peyrière
- Location within France Location within Nouvelle-Aquitaine
- Coordinates: 44°34′35″N 0°19′07″E
- Country: France
- Region: Nouvelle-Aquitaine
- Department: Lot-et-Garonne
- Arrondissement: Marmande
- Canton: Le Val du Dropt
- Intercommunality: CC Pays de Lauzun

Government
  - Mayor (2020–2026): Christel Piccolo
- Area^{1}: 8.14 km^{2} (3.14 sq mi)
- Elevation: 76 m (249 ft)
- Highest elevation: 132 m (433 ft)
- Lowest elevation: 63 m (207 ft)
- Population (2023): 293
  - Density: 36.0/km^{2} (93.2/sq mi)
- Time zone: UTC+01:00 (CET)
  - Summer (DST): UTC+02:00 (CEST)
- INSEE/Postal code: 47204 /47350
- ^{1} French Land Register data, which excludes lakes, ponds, glaciers > 1 km^{2} (0.386 sq mi or 247 acres) and river estuaries.

Peyrière (French pronunciation: [peʁjɛʁ]; Occitan: Peirièras) is a commune in the Lot-et-Garonne department in south-western France.

== See also ==
- Communes of the Lot-et-Garonne department
