= Saint-Pardoux-Isaac =

- Commune
- Location of Saint-Pardoux-Isaac
- Location within France Location within Nouvelle-Aquitaine
- Coordinates: 44°36′45″N 0°22′26″E
- Country: France
- Region: Nouvelle-Aquitaine
- Department: Lot-et-Garonne
- Arrondissement: Marmande
- Canton: Le Val du Dropt
- Intercommunality: Pays de Lauzun

Government
  - Mayor (2020–2026): Marie-José Bonadona
- Area^{1}: 7.26 km^{2} (2.80 sq mi)
- Elevation: 51 m (167 ft)
- Highest elevation: 122 m (400 ft)
- Lowest elevation: 44 m (144 ft)
- Population (2023): 1,111
  - Density: 153/km^{2} (396/sq mi)
- Time zone: UTC+01:00 (CET)
  - Summer (DST): UTC+02:00 (CEST)
- INSEE/Postal code: 47264 /47800
- ^{1} French Land Register data, which excludes lakes, ponds, glaciers > 1 km^{2} (0.386 sq mi or 247 acres) and river estuaries.

Saint-Pardoux-Isaac (French pronunciation: [sɛ̃ paʁdu izaak]; Occitan: Sent Perdon e Eisac) is a commune in the Lot-et-Garonne department in the Nouvelle-Aquitaine region of south-western France.

== Demography ==
Historical population
Year	Pop.	±% p.a.
1968	910	—
1975	1,363	+5.94%
1982	1,372	+0.09%
1990	1,348	−0.22%
1999	1,215	−1.15%
2007	1,163	−0.55%
2012	1,198	+0.59%
2017	1,141	−0.97%
2023	1,111	−0.44%
Source: INSEE

== Places of interest ==
- The church of St Pardoux
- The thirteenth century church of Isaac, under the patronage of Saint Léger.

== See also ==
- Communes of the Lot-et-Garonne department
