= Ségalas, Lot-et-Garonne =

Ségalas
- Commune
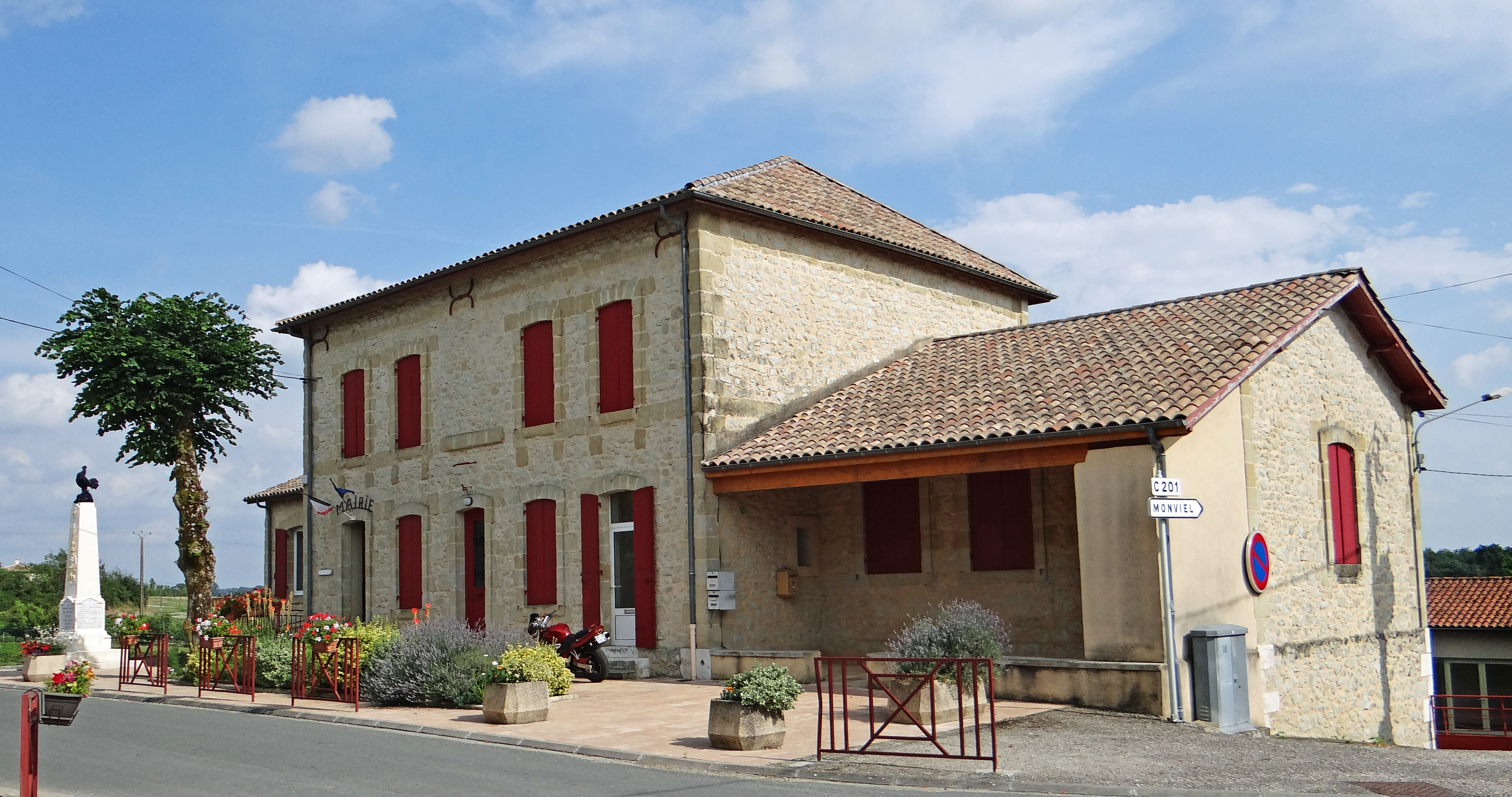
- The town hall in Ségalas
- Location of Ségalas
- Location within France Location within Nouvelle-Aquitaine
- Coordinates: 44°35′18″N 0°31′55″E
- Country: France
- Region: Nouvelle-Aquitaine
- Department: Lot-et-Garonne
- Arrondissement: Marmande
- Canton: Le Val du Dropt
- Intercommunality: CC Pays de Lauzun

Government
  - Mayor (2020–2026): Annick Callewaert
- Area^{1}: 12.84 km^{2} (4.96 sq mi)
- Elevation: 138 m (453 ft)
- Highest elevation: 153 m (502 ft)
- Lowest elevation: 77 m (253 ft)
- Population (2023): 155
  - Density: 12.1/km^{2} (31.3/sq mi)
- Time zone: UTC+01:00 (CET)
  - Summer (DST): UTC+02:00 (CEST)
- INSEE/Postal code: 47296 /47410
- ^{1} French Land Register data, which excludes lakes, ponds, glaciers > 1 km^{2} (0.386 sq mi or 247 acres) and river estuaries.

Ségalas is a commune in the Lot-et-Garonne department in south-western France.

== See also ==
- Communes of the Lot-et-Garonne department
