= Lauzun =

- Commune
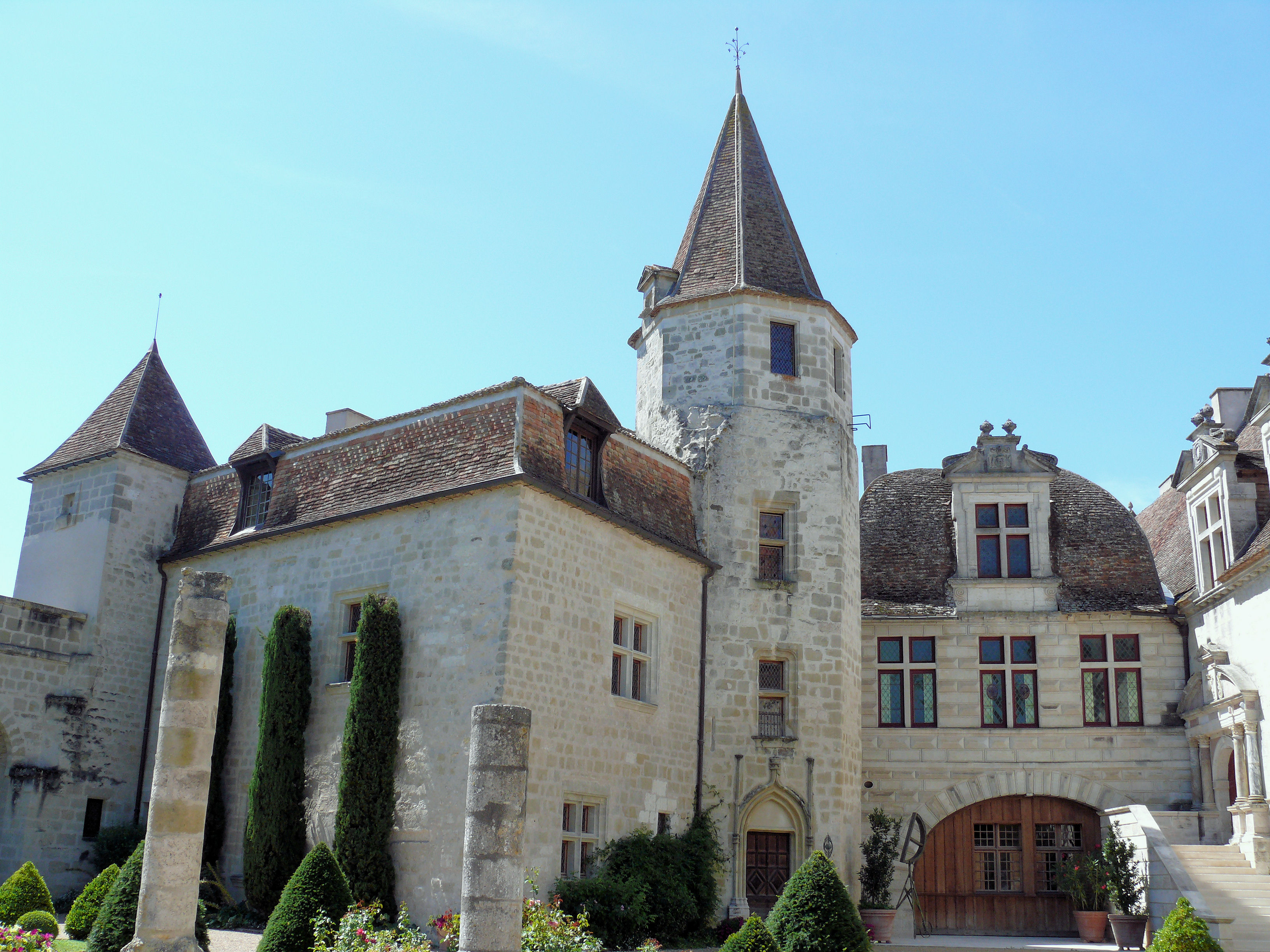
- The château in Lauzun

- Coat of arms
- Location of Lauzun
- Location within France Location within Nouvelle-Aquitaine
- Coordinates: 44°37′51″N 0°27′41″E
- Country: France
- Region: Nouvelle-Aquitaine
- Department: Lot-et-Garonne
- Arrondissement: Marmande
- Canton: Le Val du Dropt
- Intercommunality: Pays de Lauzun

Government
  - Mayor (2020–2026): Jean-Pierre Barjou
- Area^{1}: 24.09 km^{2} (9.30 sq mi)
- Elevation: 98 m (322 ft)
- Highest elevation: 122 m (400 ft)
- Lowest elevation: 53 m (174 ft)
- Population (2023): 735
  - Density: 30.5/km^{2} (79.0/sq mi)
- Time zone: UTC+01:00 (CET)
  - Summer (DST): UTC+02:00 (CEST)
- INSEE/Postal code: 47142 /47410
- ^{1} French Land Register data, which excludes lakes, ponds, glaciers > 1 km^{2} (0.386 sq mi or 247 acres) and river estuaries.

Lauzun (French pronunciation: [lozœ̃]; Languedocien: Lausun) is a commune in the Lot-et-Garonne department in south-western France. The village of Lauzun is located in the north of Lot et Garonne, in the Nouvelle-Aquitaine region. It is separated from Périgord (Dordogne) by the river Dropt. It is on the D1 road, between Miramont and Castillonnes.

== History ==
Lauzun's strategic hilltop position was the site of a Gallo-Roman settlement, with a castle developed from the 6th century.

The de Caumont family were the lords of Lauzun from the 12th century until the French Revolution. The title Baron de Lauzun was elevated to become Comte de Lauzon from 1570 and Duc de Lauzun from 1692.

The Chateau de Lauzun was developed from the original medieval fortress as a Renaissance palace, hosting visits from Catherine de Medicis and her son, the future King Charles IX.

The church of St Etienne has a 15th-century Madonna & child sculpture, a 16th-century polychrome statue of Christ and a 17th-century altar and pulpit, commissioned by Nompar de Caumont, Compte de Lauzun, in 1623.

In 1793, Lauzun was made a district centre of the Lot and Garonne department, with a law court and a post office.

=== Notable residents ===
- Antonin Nompar de Caumont, Duke of Lauzun (1633–1723), courtier, general, Governor of Berry and husband of Anne of Orleans.
- Armand Louis de Gontaut-Biron, Duke of Lauzun (1747–1793), general in both the US and French revolutions.
- Pierre Boussion (1753–1829), doctor and member of the revolutionary Assemblee Generale.
- François-Peloubet Chabrier (1789–1871), senator and archivist.

== Elections ==
In the 2007 presidential elections, Lauzun voted narrowly for Segolene Royal (50.11%) ahead of the eventual victor, Nicolas Sarkozy (49.89%).

In the 2012 presidential elections, Lauzun voted narrowly for Nicolas Sarkozy (51.94%) ahead of the eventual victor, Francois Hollande (48.06%).

== See also ==
- Communes of the Lot-et-Garonne department
