= Cahuzac, Lot-et-Garonne =

Cahuzac
- Commune
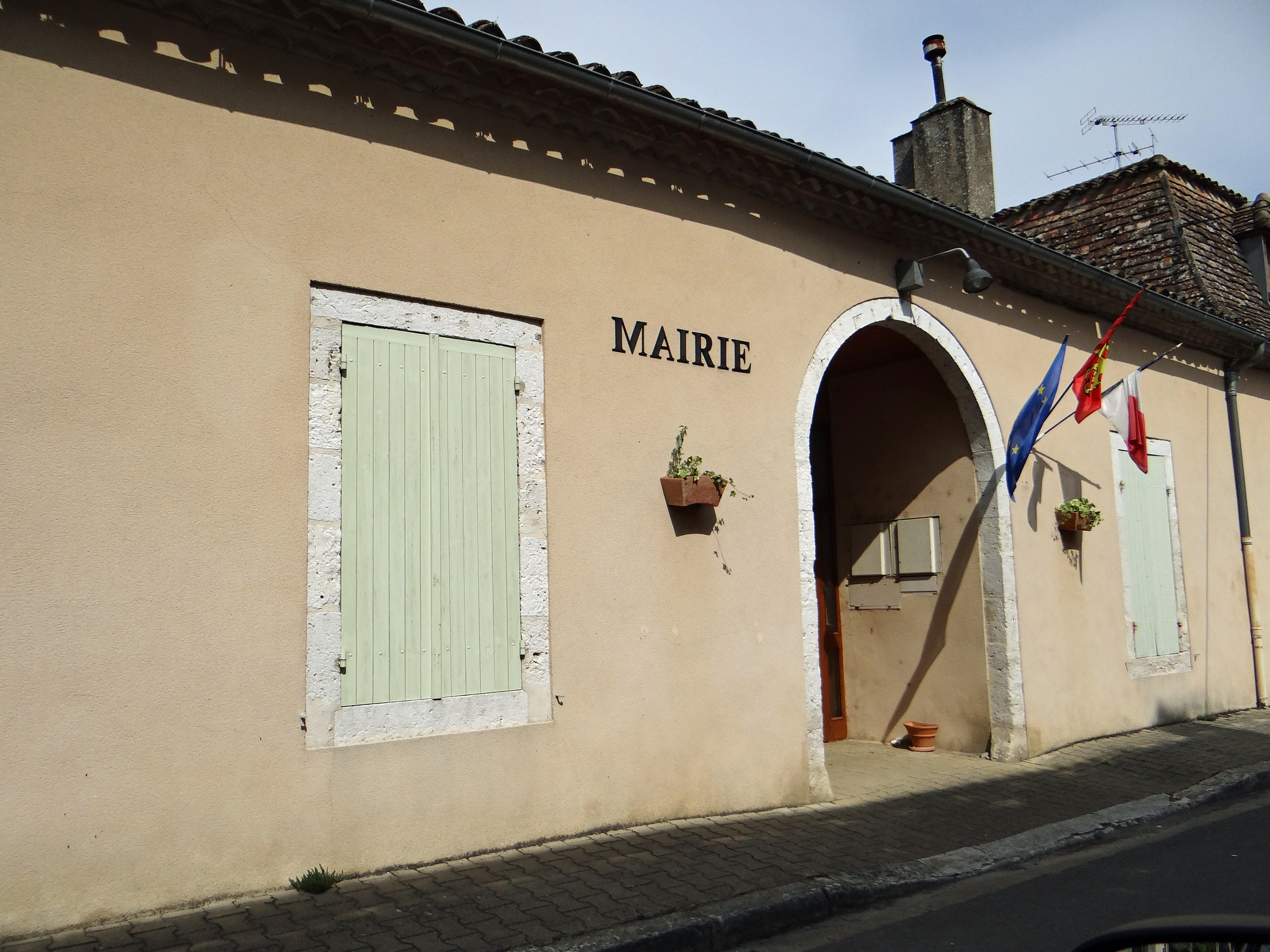
- The town hall in Cahuzac
- Location of Cahuzac
- Location within France Location within Nouvelle-Aquitaine
- Coordinates: 44°39′39″N 0°33′36″E
- Country: France
- Region: Nouvelle-Aquitaine
- Department: Lot-et-Garonne
- Arrondissement: Villeneuve-sur-Lot
- Canton: Le Val du Dropt

Government
  - Mayor (2020–2026): Jean-Pierre Testut
- Area^{1}: 8.04 km^{2} (3.10 sq mi)
- Elevation: 123 m (404 ft)
- Highest elevation: 144 m (472 ft)
- Lowest elevation: 58 m (190 ft)
- Population (2023): 308
  - Density: 38.3/km^{2} (99.2/sq mi)
- Time zone: UTC+01:00 (CET)
  - Summer (DST): UTC+02:00 (CEST)
- INSEE/Postal code: 47044 /47330
- ^{1} French Land Register data, which excludes lakes, ponds, glaciers > 1 km^{2} (0.386 sq mi or 247 acres) and river estuaries.

Cahuzac (French pronunciation: [ka.yzak]; Occitan: Caüsac) is a commune in the Lot-et-Garonne department in south-western France.

== See also ==
- Communes of the Lot-et-Garonne department
