= Castillonnès =

- Commune
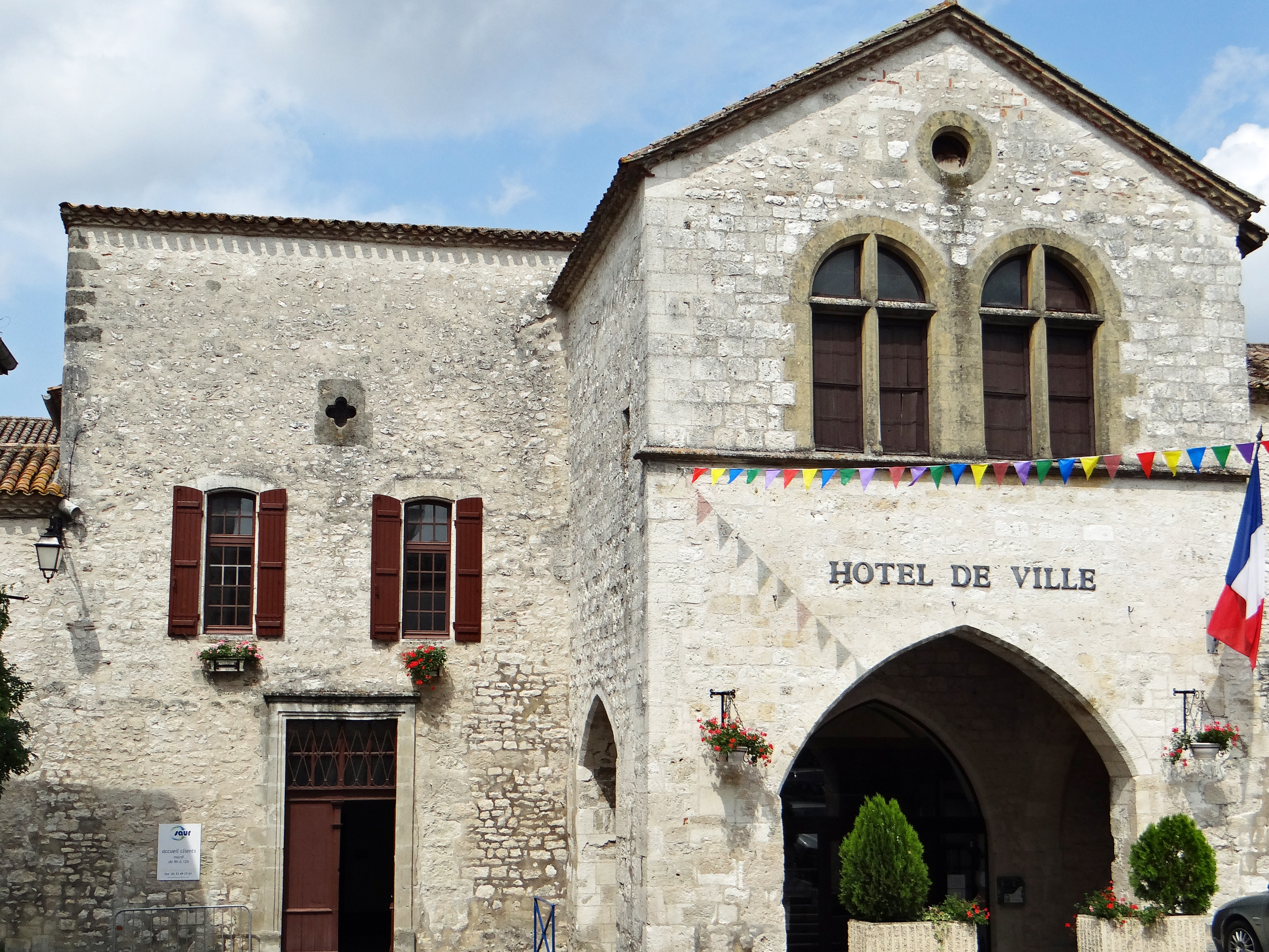
- The town hall in Castillonnès

- Coat of arms
- Location of Castillonnès
- Location within France Location within Nouvelle-Aquitaine
- Coordinates: 44°39′11″N 0°35′33″E
- Country: France
- Region: Nouvelle-Aquitaine
- Department: Lot-et-Garonne
- Arrondissement: Villeneuve-sur-Lot
- Canton: Le Val du Dropt

Government
  - Mayor (2020–2026): Pierre Sicaud
- Area^{1}: 19.4 km^{2} (7.5 sq mi)
- Elevation: 131 m (430 ft)
- Highest elevation: 145 m (476 ft)
- Lowest elevation: 62 m (203 ft)
- Population (2023): 1,346
  - Density: 69.4/km^{2} (180/sq mi)
- Time zone: UTC+01:00 (CET)
  - Summer (DST): UTC+02:00 (CEST)
- INSEE/Postal code: 47057 /47330
- ^{1} French Land Register data, which excludes lakes, ponds, glaciers > 1 km^{2} (0.386 sq mi or 247 acres) and river estuaries.

Castillonnès (French pronunciation: [kastijɔnɛs]; Occitan: Castilhonés) is a commune in the Lot-et-Garonne department in south-western France.

== See also ==
- Communes of the Lot-et-Garonne department
