= Verteuil-d'Agenais =

- Commune
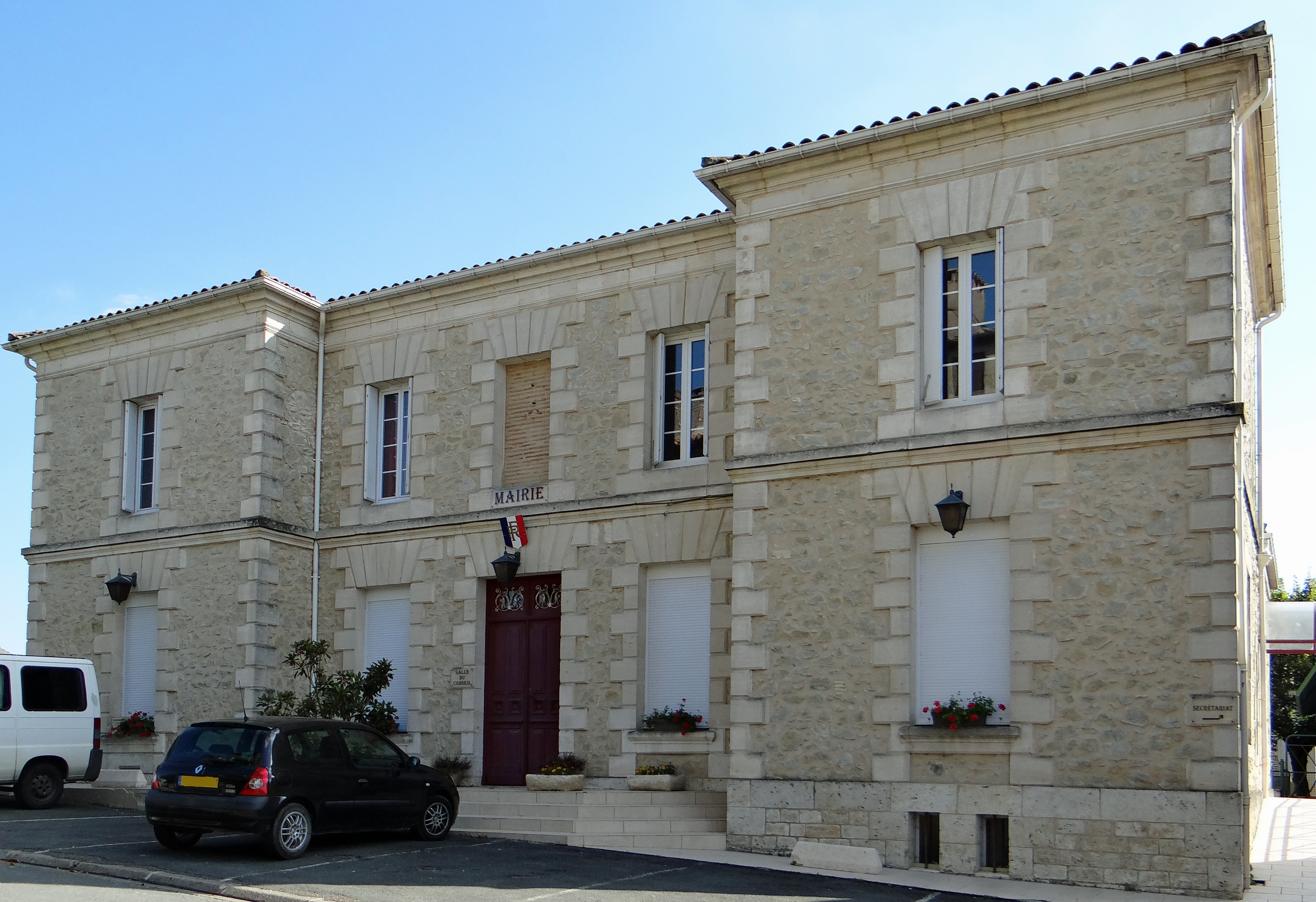
- Verteuil-d'Agenais Town hall

- Coat of arms
- Location of Verteuil-d'Agenais
- Location within France Location within Nouvelle-Aquitaine
- Coordinates: 44°27′56″N 0°24′56″E
- Country: France
- Region: Nouvelle-Aquitaine
- Department: Lot-et-Garonne
- Arrondissement: Marmande
- Canton: Tonneins
- Intercommunality: CC Lot et Tolzac

Government
  - Mayor (2020–2026): Jean-Claude Blay
- Area^{1}: 22.42 km^{2} (8.66 sq mi)
- Elevation: 80 m (260 ft)
- Highest elevation: 137 m (449 ft)
- Lowest elevation: 43 m (141 ft)
- Population (2023): 539
  - Density: 24.0/km^{2} (62.3/sq mi)
- Time zone: UTC+01:00 (CET)
  - Summer (DST): UTC+02:00 (CEST)
- INSEE/Postal code: 47317 /47260
- ^{1} French Land Register data, which excludes lakes, ponds, glaciers > 1 km^{2} (0.386 sq mi or 247 acres) and river estuaries.

Verteuil-d'Agenais (French pronunciation: [vɛʁtœj daʒ(ə)nɛ], literally Verteuil of Agenais; Occitan: Vertuèlh d'Agenés) is a commune in the Lot-et-Garonne department in south-western France.

== Monuments ==
- Château de Verteuil

== See also ==
- Communes of the Lot-et-Garonne department
