= Château de Verteuil (Lot-et-Garonne) =

Château in Verteuil-d'Agenais, France

Coordinates: 44°27′52″N 00°24′55″E

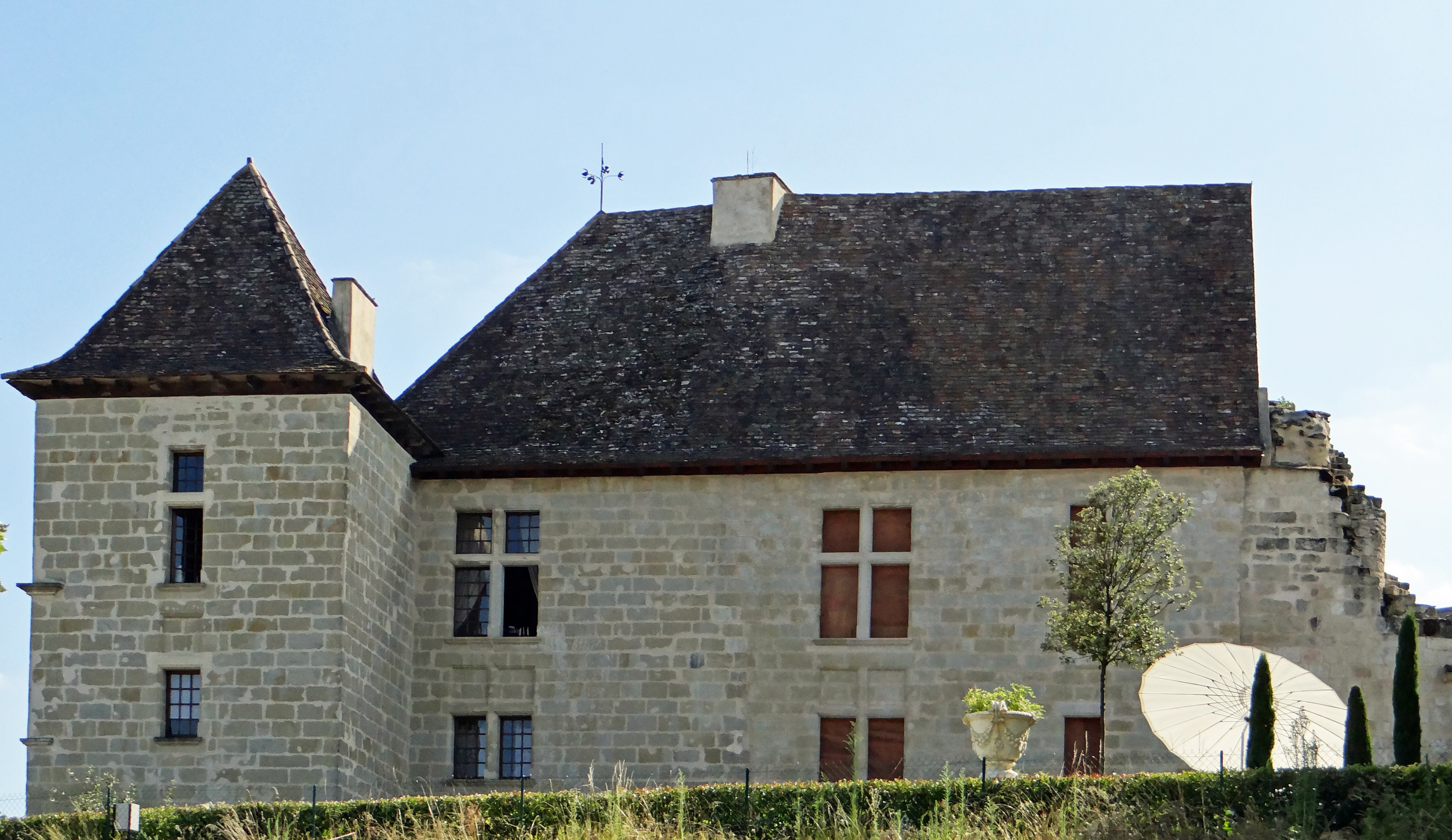
Château de Verteuil, otherwise Château des Vallons

The Château de Verteuil, also known as Château des Vallons, is a château in Verteuil-d'Agenais, Lot-et-Garonne, France.

== History ==
A castrum or small fort was documented there in 1259, around the motte. The village developed around the motte. From 1259 to 1390, the Château was in the possession of De Pis family. The Château was in a state of ruin at the end of the Hundred Years' War.

It was given in 1460 to Aymeric of Caumont, Lord of Lauzun. He began the construction of the present château after 1460.

== Design ==
The medieval remains comprise a rocky escarpment of stone, dressed and in places built up, forming a first walled fortification of around 80 metres in diameter, against which lean the village houses on the north side. In the centre a curtain wall links with the heptagonal and vaulted north-west tower, probably dating from the 15th century.

To the east is a section of wall of a room with a ceiling of groined vaults on sculpted corbels columns, probably dating from the end of the Middle Ages.

The main structure to the south-east, which is the main building, with a wing in ruins at right-angles to the north, was constructed around the turn of the 16th and 17th centuries by the then-owners, the De Caumont family. According to the date of a building estimate established by Sarrazi, the west side of the corps de logis was refurbished in 1839 for use as a school.

The château had been abandoned by 1996. It was purchased by Patrice Durandet in 2002 and one wing has since been restored as a hotel under the name "Château des Vallons".

The château was listed as a monument historique on 10 January 1996.
