= Almont-les-Junies =

Commune in Occitanie, France

- Commune
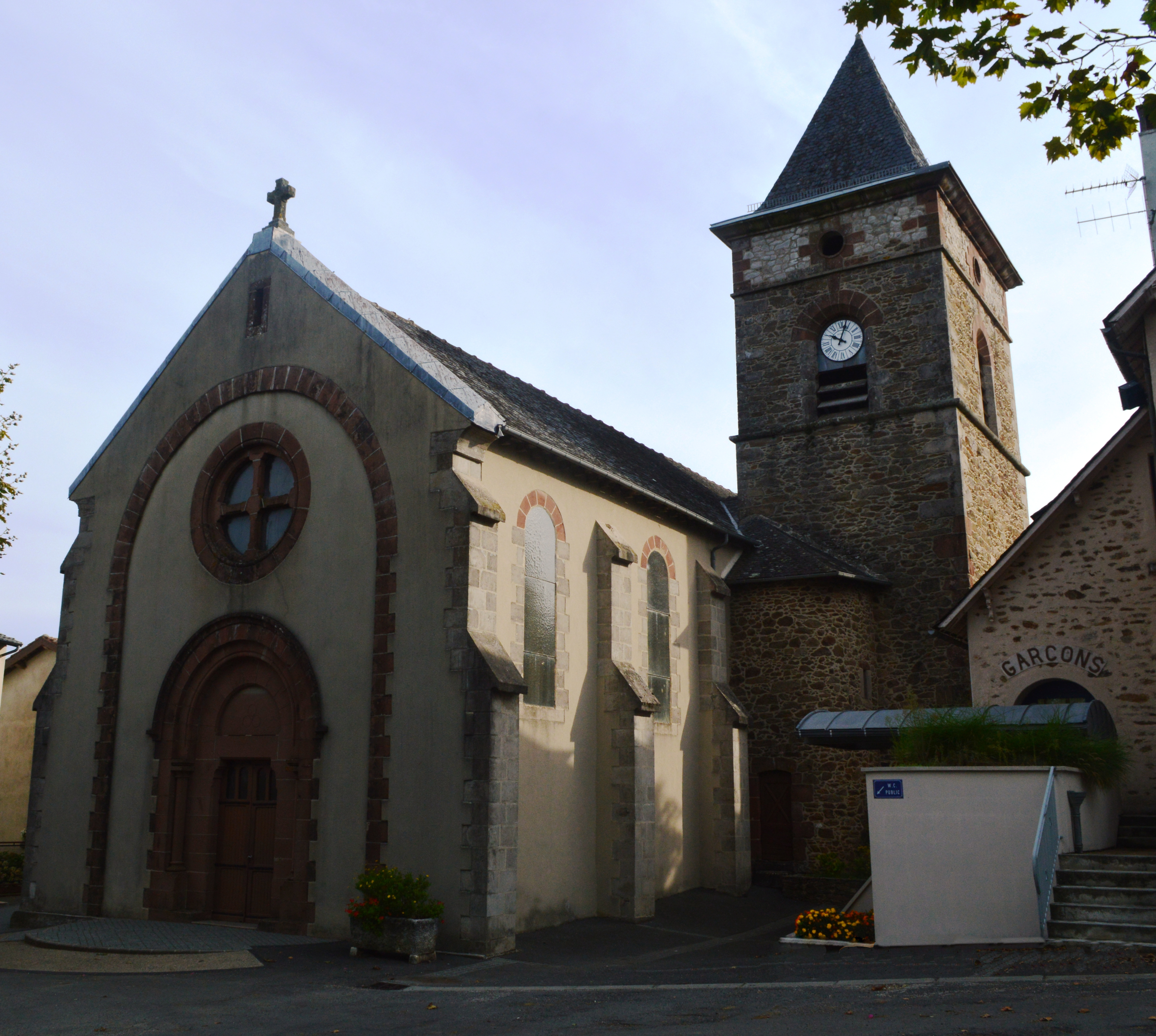
- The church in Almont-les-Junies
- Location of Almont-les-Junies
- Location within France Location within Occitanie
- Coordinates: 44°35′49″N 2°17′38″E
- Country: France
- Region: Occitania
- Department: Aveyron
- Arrondissement: Villefranche-de-Rouergue
- Canton: Lot et Dourdou
- Intercommunality: Decazeville Communauté

Government
  - Mayor (2020–2026): Bruno Cavaignac
- Area^{1}: 23.75 km^{2} (9.17 sq mi)
- Elevation: 470 m (1,540 ft)
- Highest elevation: 556 m (1,824 ft)
- Lowest elevation: 180 m (590 ft)
- Population (2023): 437
  - Density: 18.4/km^{2} (47.7/sq mi)
- Time zone: UTC+01:00 (CET)
  - Summer (DST): UTC+02:00 (CEST)
- INSEE/Postal code: 12004 /12300
- ^{1} French Land Register data, which excludes lakes, ponds, glaciers > 1 km^{2} (0.386 sq mi or 247 acres) and river estuaries.

Almont-les-Junies (French pronunciation: [almɔ̃ le ʒyni]; Occitan: Las Juniás) is a commune in the Aveyron department in the Occitanie region of southern France.

== Geography ==
Almont-les-Junies is located some 20 km east of Figeac and 40 km north-east of Rodez. The commune can be accessed by road D508 which runs east from Flagnac through the commune and changes to road D606 before exiting east and forming the south-eastern border as it runs south-east to Noailhac. The D183 road also runs through the south of the commune running west to east. The village can be reached by a number of country roads which cover most of the commune. The most direct perhaps is the Graville-et-Courbies road which runs south from the D508.

The commune contains both large areas of farmland as well as mountain slopes with forests.

There are many streams in the commune - the southern border is marked by the Rousseau de Limou which flows into the Lot river just west of the commune. The Lot river itself also forms the northern border of the commune and all of the many streams flow into this river.

There are a number of hamlets and villages in the commune. These are:

- Aumont
- Ginouilhac
- La Mole Haute
- La Plane
- Laval
- Le Fau
- Les Clementies
- L'Hom
- Mazac
- Sainte Catherine

== History ==
In March 1993, the town of Almon-les-Junies was renamed Almont-les-Junies with a "t" to be closer to the Latin root of Almontis. Road signs in the area remained unchanged for some years.

== Administration ==
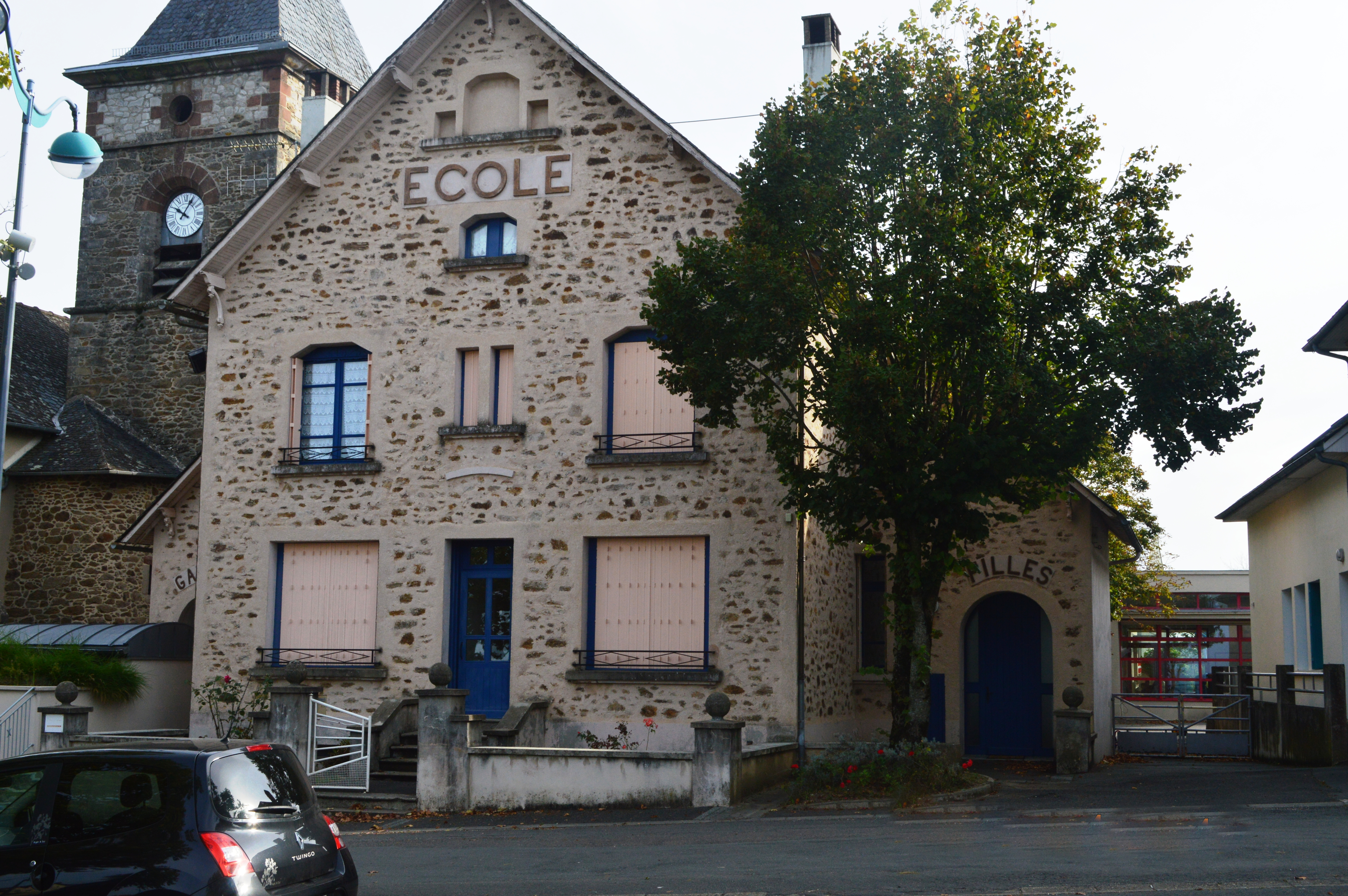
Almont-les-Junies School

List of Successive Mayors of Almont-les-Junies

From	To	Name	Party
1860	1876	Adolphe Centres	
1876	1881	Benjamin Rols	
1881	1888	Grégoire Romiguiere	
1888	1892	Germain Griffouliere	
1892	1912	Charles Centres	
1912	1919	Philippe Dalmon	
1919	1925	Charles Centres	
1925	1944	Firmin Cerles	
1944	1945	Justin Romiguiere	
1945	1971	Jean-Marie Centres	
1971	2001	Gabriel Romiguiere	
2001	2020	Patrick Grialou	DVD
2020	2026	Bruno Cavaignac	

== Population ==
The inhabitants of the commune are known as Junhalmontois or Junhalmontoises in French.

Historical population
Year	Pop.	±% p.a.
1968	565	—
1975	541	−0.62%
1982	518	−0.62%
1990	472	−1.16%
1999	425	−1.16%
2007	489	+1.77%
2012	482	−0.29%
2017	464	−0.76%
2023	437	−0.99%
Source: INSEE

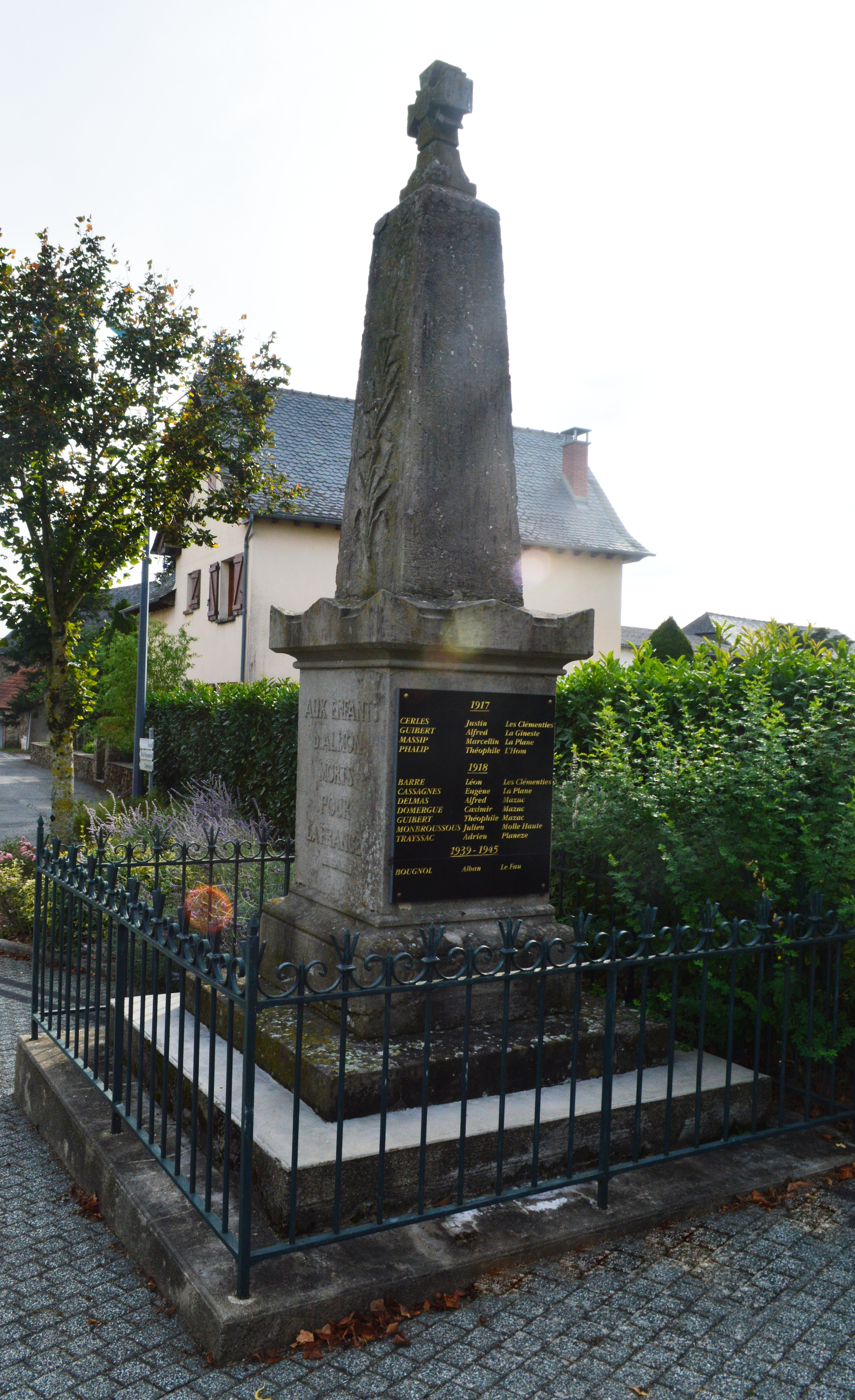
Almont-les-Junies War Memorial

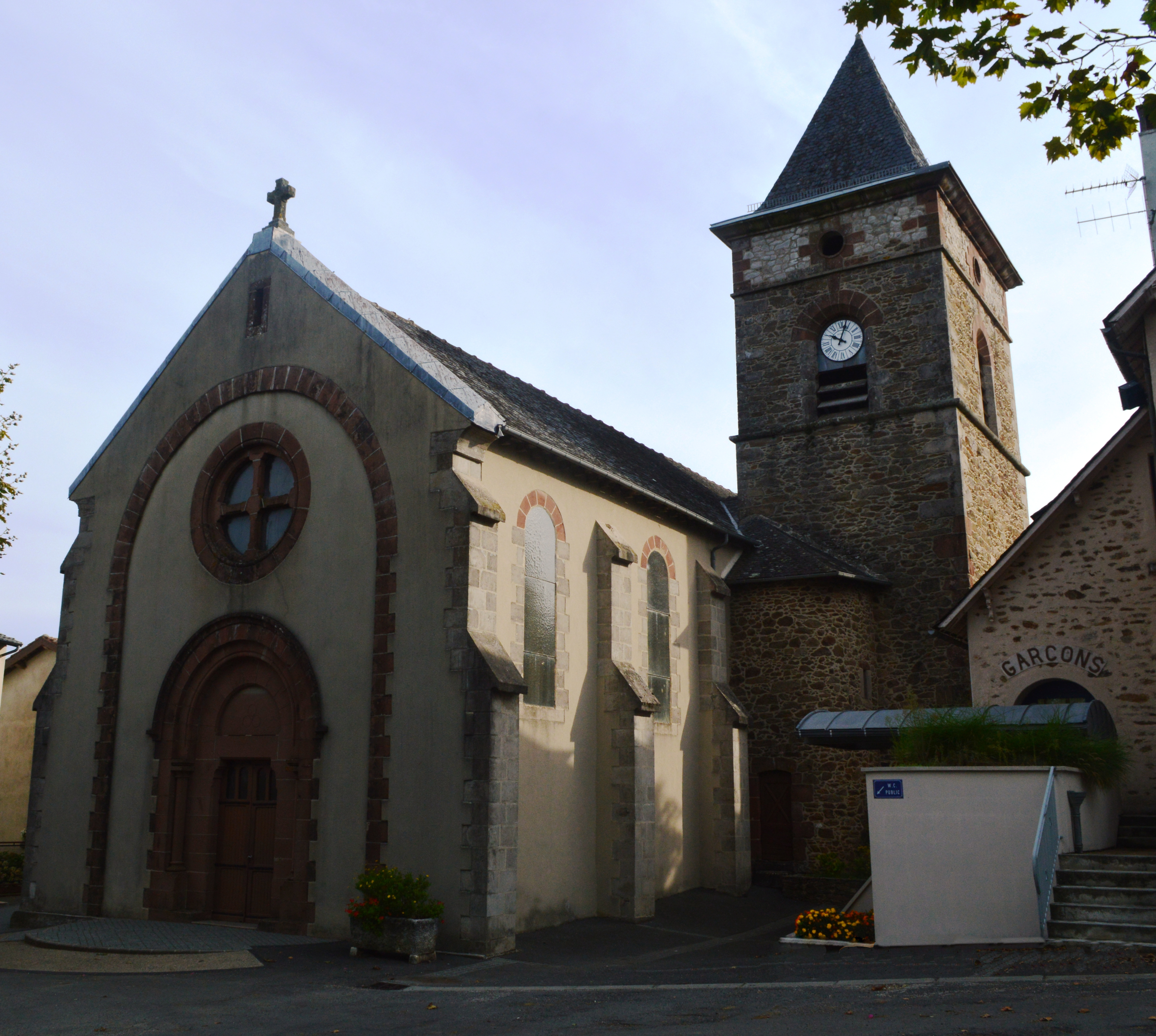
Almont-les-Junies Church

== See also ==
- Communes of the Aveyron department
