= Saint-Cyprien-sur-Dourdou =

Part of Conques-en-Rouergue in Occitanie, France

- Part of Conques-en-Rouergue
- Former abbatial residence

- Coat of arms
- Location of Saint-Cyprien-sur-Dourdou
- Location within France Location within Occitanie
- Coordinates: 44°32′53″N 2°24′46″E
- Country: France
- Region: Occitania
- Department: Aveyron
- Arrondissement: Rodez
- Canton: Lot et Dourdou
- Commune: Conques-en-Rouergue
- Area^{1}: 30.23 km^{2} (11.67 sq mi)
- Elevation: 248 m (814 ft)
- Highest elevation: 645 m (2,116 ft)
- Lowest elevation: 229 m (751 ft)
- Population (2023): 806
  - Density: 26.7/km^{2} (69.1/sq mi)
- Time zone: UTC+01:00 (CET)
  - Summer (DST): UTC+02:00 (CEST)
- Postal code: 12320
- ^{1} French Land Register data, which excludes lakes, ponds, glaciers > 1 km^{2} (0.386 sq mi or 247 acres) and river estuaries.

Saint-Cyprien-sur-Dourdou (French pronunciation: [sɛ̃ sipʁijɛ̃ syʁ duʁdu], literally Saint-Cyprien on Dourdou; Occitan: Sent Cebrian) is a former commune in the Aveyron department in southern France. On 1 January 2016, it was merged into the new commune of Conques-en-Rouergue.

== See also ==
- Communes of the Aveyron department
