= Seyssel Canton =

Seyssel Canton may refer to:

- Seyssel, Ain
- Seyssel, Haute-Savoie
