= Noailhac =

Noailhac may refer to the following places in France:

- Noailhac, Aveyron, a commune in the department of Aveyron
- Noailhac, Corrèze, a commune in the department of Corrèze
- Noailhac, Tarn, a commune in the department of Tarn
