= Grand-Vabre =

Part of Conques-en-Rouergue in Occitanie, France

- Part of Conques-en-Rouergue
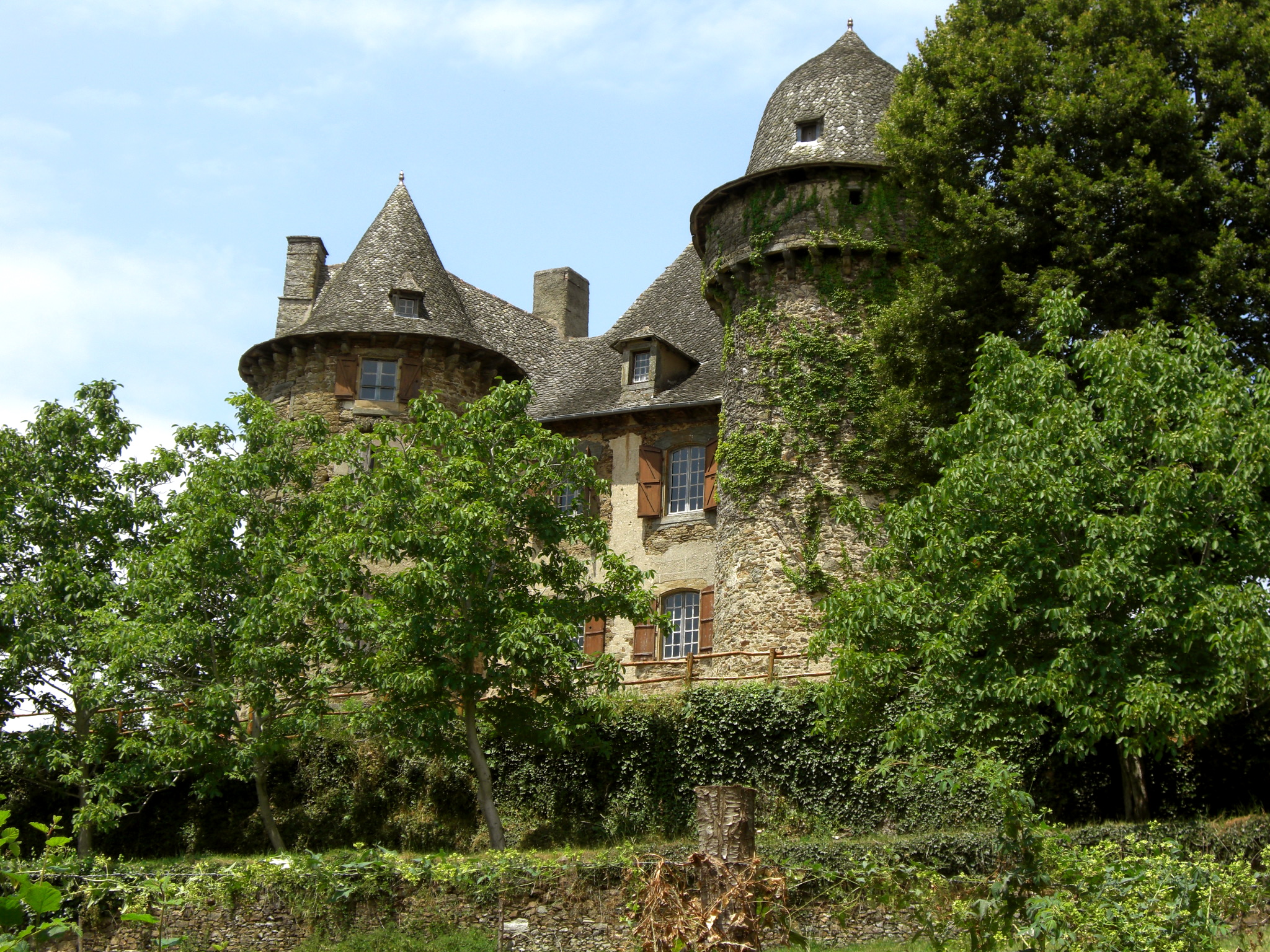
- Chateau of Selves

- Coat of arms
- Location of Grand-Vabre
- Location within France Location within Occitanie
- Coordinates: 44°37′48″N 2°21′32″E
- Country: France
- Region: Occitania
- Department: Aveyron
- Arrondissement: Rodez
- Canton: Lot et Dourdou
- Commune: Conques-en-Rouergue
- Area^{1}: 29.53 km^{2} (11.40 sq mi)
- Elevation: 220 m (720 ft)
- Highest elevation: 629 m (2,064 ft)
- Lowest elevation: 180 m (590 ft)
- Population (2023): 358
  - Density: 12.1/km^{2} (31.4/sq mi)
- Time zone: UTC+01:00 (CET)
  - Summer (DST): UTC+02:00 (CEST)
- Postal code: 12320
- ^{1} French Land Register data, which excludes lakes, ponds, glaciers > 1 km^{2} (0.386 sq mi or 247 acres) and river estuaries.

- Grand-Vabre (French pronunciation: [ɡʁɑ̃ vabʁ]; Occitan: Gandvabre) is a former commune in the Aveyron department in southern France. On 1 January 2016, it was merged into the new commune of Conques-en-Rouergue.

== Site: ==
The municipality of Grand Vabre is located at the confluence of the Lot and the Dourdou, in the immediate vicinity of Conques. It consists of the village of Grand Vabre itself, on the banks of the Dourdou, whose relatively encased valley protects from the winds of the north and generates a micro-climate that can be quite hot in summer and relatively mild in winter, and farms or hamlets spread over the surrounding hills, overlooking the Dourdou or the Lot, and featuring panoramas like in La Vinzelle.

== Important Places and Monuments: ==
- Pont des Cazelles, located at the confluence of the 2 rivers, the Lot and the Dourdou. The bridge was designed to integrate as well as possible into the environment. This discreet structure delicately rests on the banks of the Lot with a steel and concrete apron used wisely to anchor the bridge.
- Dadon Chapel, located in the village's center.
- Château de Selves, situated in the hamlet of La Vinzelle. (top picture in the description above)
- Saint-Pierre Church, dating from the fifteenth century. It is also presides near the heart of the village.
- Pont de Coursavy, which is a bridge that is unfortunately, not passable at the moment.

== Coat of Arms ==
To the 1st half cut, there is a natural insulated bridge of four arches with a background of silver, the 2nd with a sailboat outlined with silver and a background of azure. At the top, there is a band of gules with three silver seashells.

== See also ==
- Communes of the Aveyron department
