= Conques =

Commune in Aveyron, France

Conques Concas (Occitan)
- Part of Conques-en-Rouergue
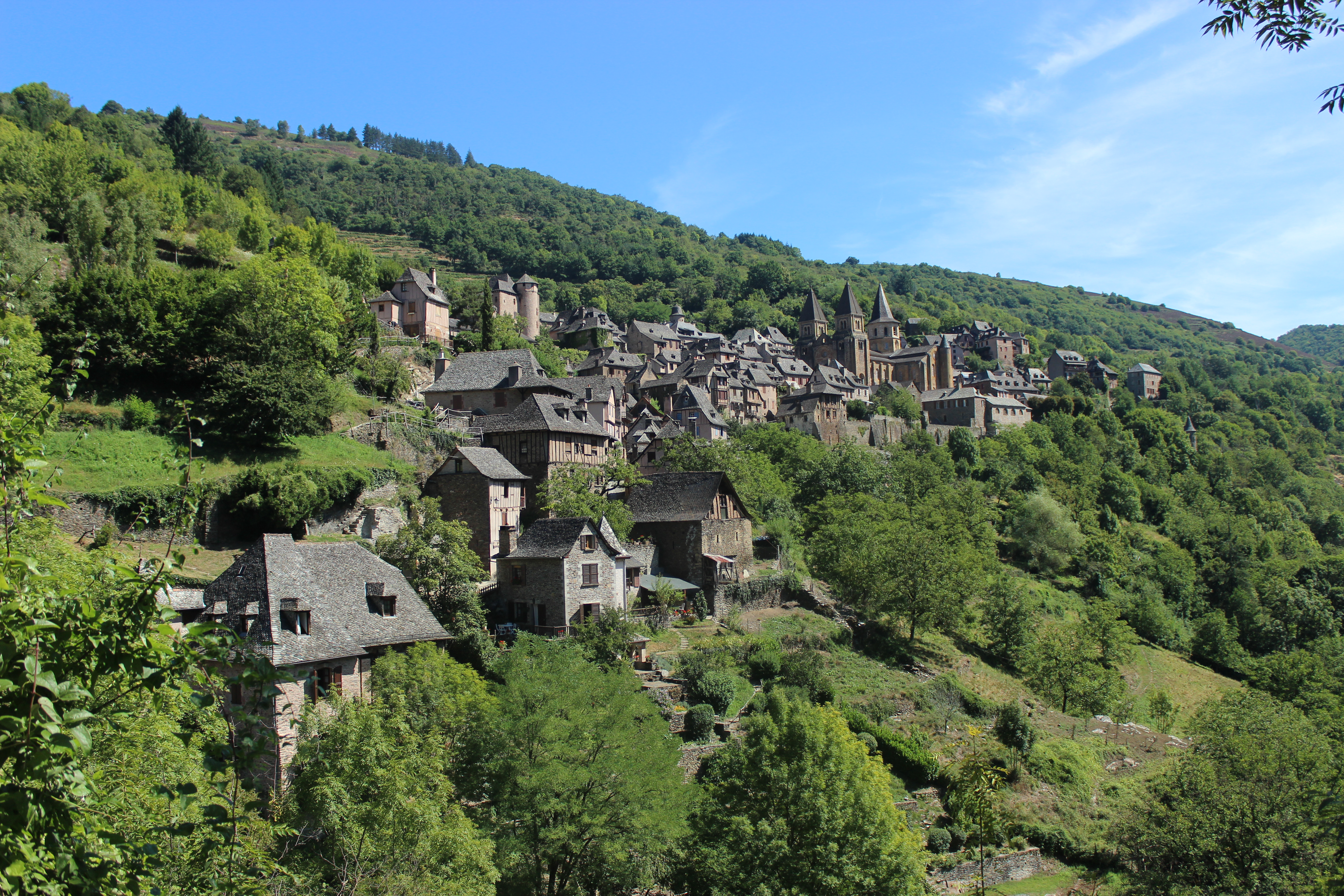
- A view of Conques

- Coat of arms
- Location of Conques
- Location within France Location within Occitanie
- Coordinates: 44°36′01″N 2°23′50″E
- Country: France
- Region: Occitania
- Department: Aveyron
- Arrondissement: Rodez
- Canton: Lot et Dourdou
- Commune: Conques-en-Rouergue
- Area^{1}: 30.51 km^{2} (11.78 sq mi)
- Elevation: 442 m (1,450 ft)
- Highest elevation: 663 m (2,175 ft)
- Lowest elevation: 221 m (725 ft)
- Population (2021): 237
  - Density: 7.77/km^{2} (20.1/sq mi)
- Time zone: UTC+01:00 (CET)
  - Summer (DST): UTC+02:00 (CEST)
- Postal code: 12320
- ^{1} French Land Register data, which excludes lakes, ponds, glaciers > 1 km^{2} (0.386 sq mi or 247 acres) and river estuaries.

Conques (French pronunciation: [kɔ̃k]; Languedocien: Concas) is a former commune in the Aveyron department in Southern France, in the Occitania region. On 1 January 2016, it was merged into the new commune of Conques-en-Rouergue.

== Geography ==
The village is located at the confluence of the rivers Dourdou de Conques and Ouche. It is built on a hillside and has classic narrow medieval streets. As a result, large vehicles such as buses cannot enter the historic town centre and must park outside. Consequently, most day visitors enter on foot. The town was largely passed by in the nineteenth century, and was saved from oblivion by the efforts of a small number of dedicated people. As a result, the historic core of the town has very little construction dating from between 1800 and 1950, leaving the medieval structures remarkably intact. The roads have been paved, and modern-day utility lines are buried. It is one of Les Plus Beaux Villages de France (most beautiful villages of France).

The town is situated in a valley. Its name originates from Occitan conca 'basin', which is derived from Latin concha 'shell'.

== Abbey Church of Sainte-Foy ==
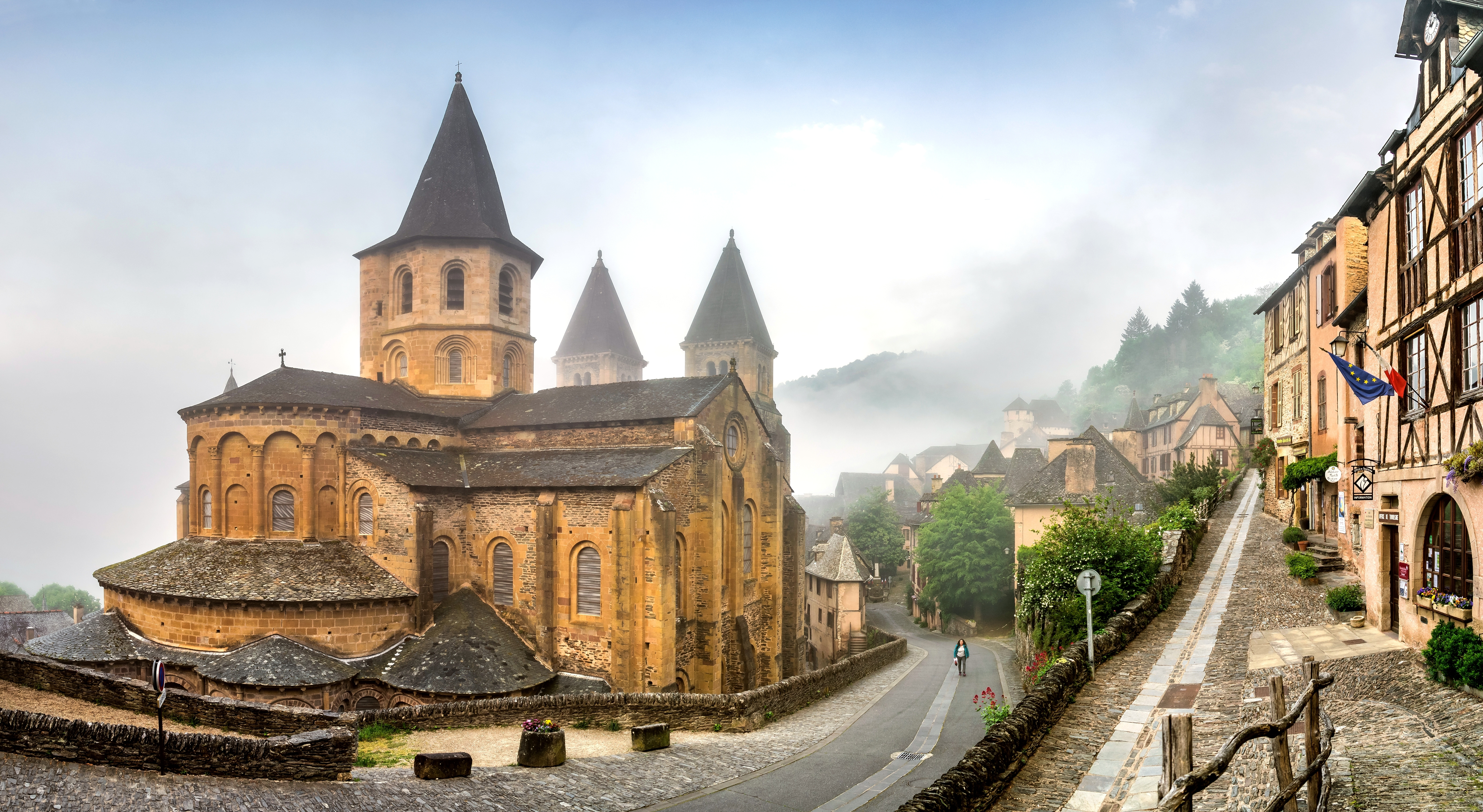
The Sainte-Foy abbey church in Conques

The Abbey Church of Sainte-Foy in Conques was a popular stop for pilgrims on the Camino de Santiago on their way to Santiago de Compostela in what is now Spain. The main draw for medieval pilgrims at Conques were the remains of Saint Faith ("Sainte-Foy"), a martyred young woman from the fourth century.

The original monastery building at Conques was an eighth-century oratory built by monks fleeing the Saracens in Spain. The original chapel was destroyed in the eleventh century in order to facilitate the creation of a much larger church as the arrival of the relics of Sainte-Foy caused the pilgrimage route to shift from Agen to Conques. The second phase of construction, which was completed by the end of the eleventh-century, included the building of the five radiating chapels, the ambulatory with a lower roof, the choir without the gallery and the nave without the galleries. The third phase of construction, which was completed early in the twelfth-century, was inspired by the churches of Toulouse and Santiago Compostela. Like most pilgrimage churches Conques is a basilica plan that has been modified into a cruciform plan. Galleries were added over the aisle and the roof was raised over the transept and choir to allow people to circulate at the gallery level. The western aisle was also added to allow for increased pilgrim traffic. The exterior length of the church is 59 meters. The interior length is 56 meters. the width of each transept is 4 meters. The height of the crossing tower is 26.40 meters tall.

The Abbey Church of Sainte-Foy was added to the UNESCO World Heritage Sites in 1998, as part of the World Heritage Sites of the Routes of Santiago de Compostela in France. Its Romanesque architecture, albeit somewhat updated in places, is displayed in periodic self-guided tour opportunities, especially of the upper level, some of which occur at night with live music and appropriately-adjusted light levels.

== Population ==
Historical population

Year	Pop.	±% p.a.
1793	1,055	—
1800	1,107	+0.69%
1806	1,234	+1.83%
1821	1,317	+0.43%
1831	1,309	−0.06%
1836	1,360	+0.77%
1841	1,418	+0.84%
1846	1,387	−0.44%
1851	1,117	−4.24%
1856	1,388	+4.44%
1861	1,288	−1.48%
1866	1,301	+0.20%
1872	1,220	−1.07%
1876	1,267	+0.95%
1881	1,282	+0.24%
1886	1,286	+0.06%
1891	1,211	−1.19%

Year	Pop.	±% p.a.
1896	561	−14.26%
1901	993	+12.10%
1906	990	−0.06%
1911	902	−1.84%
1921	755	−1.76%
1926	725	−0.81%
1931	709	−0.45%
1936	686	−0.66%
1946	647	−0.58%
1954	561	−1.77%
1962	529	−0.73%
1968	479	−1.64%
1975	420	−1.86%
1982	404	−0.55%
1990	362	−1.36%
1999	302	−1.99%
2021	237	−1.10%

Source: EHESS and INSEE

== Media ==
American author Hannah Green wrote a non-fiction work about Conques and the church entitled Little Saint, based on her visit to the town in 1975.

The massive movie set of the fictional provincial town of Villeneuve in Beauty and the Beast was inspired by the town of Conques.

== Gallery ==
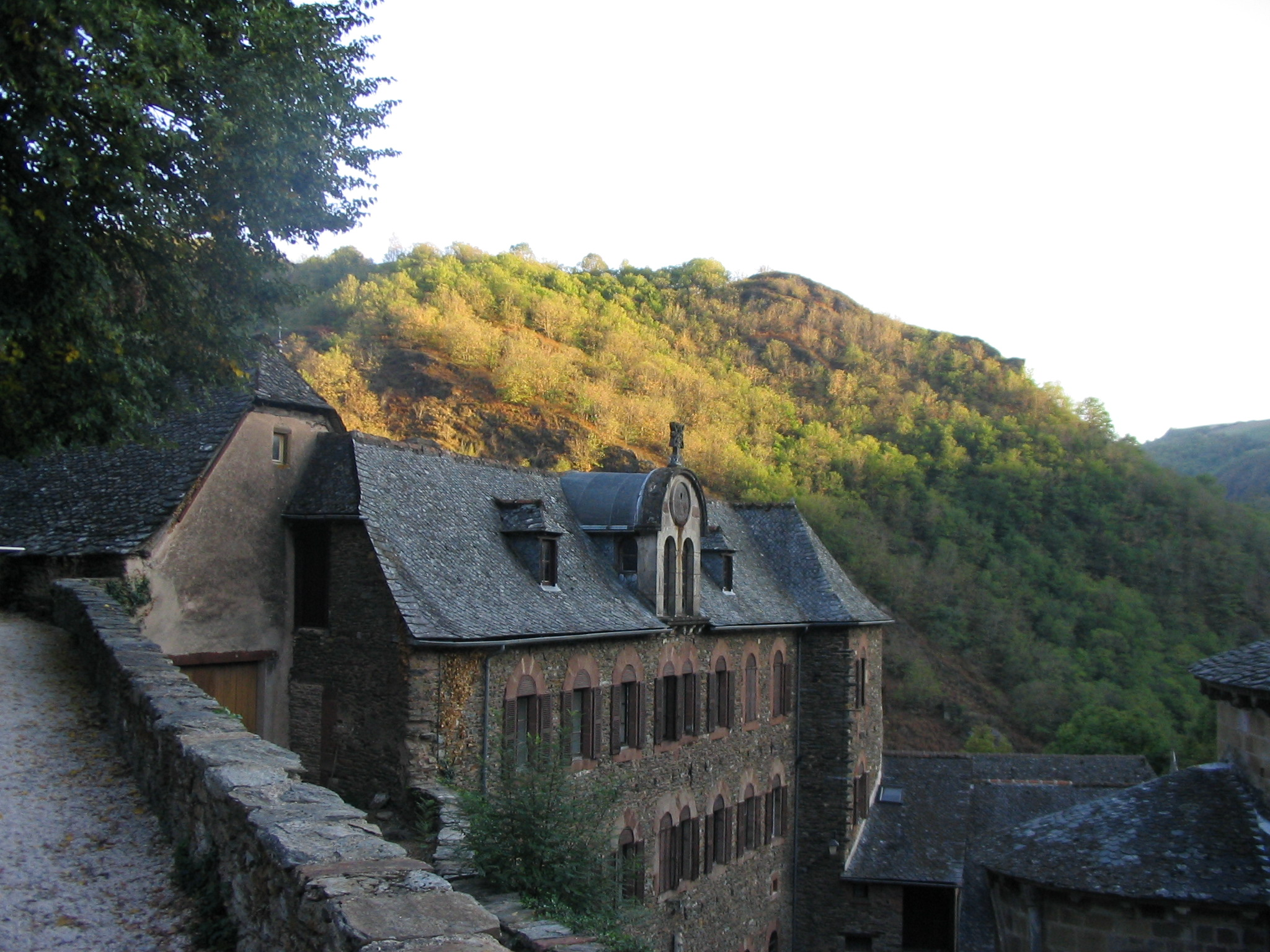
Conques hermitage

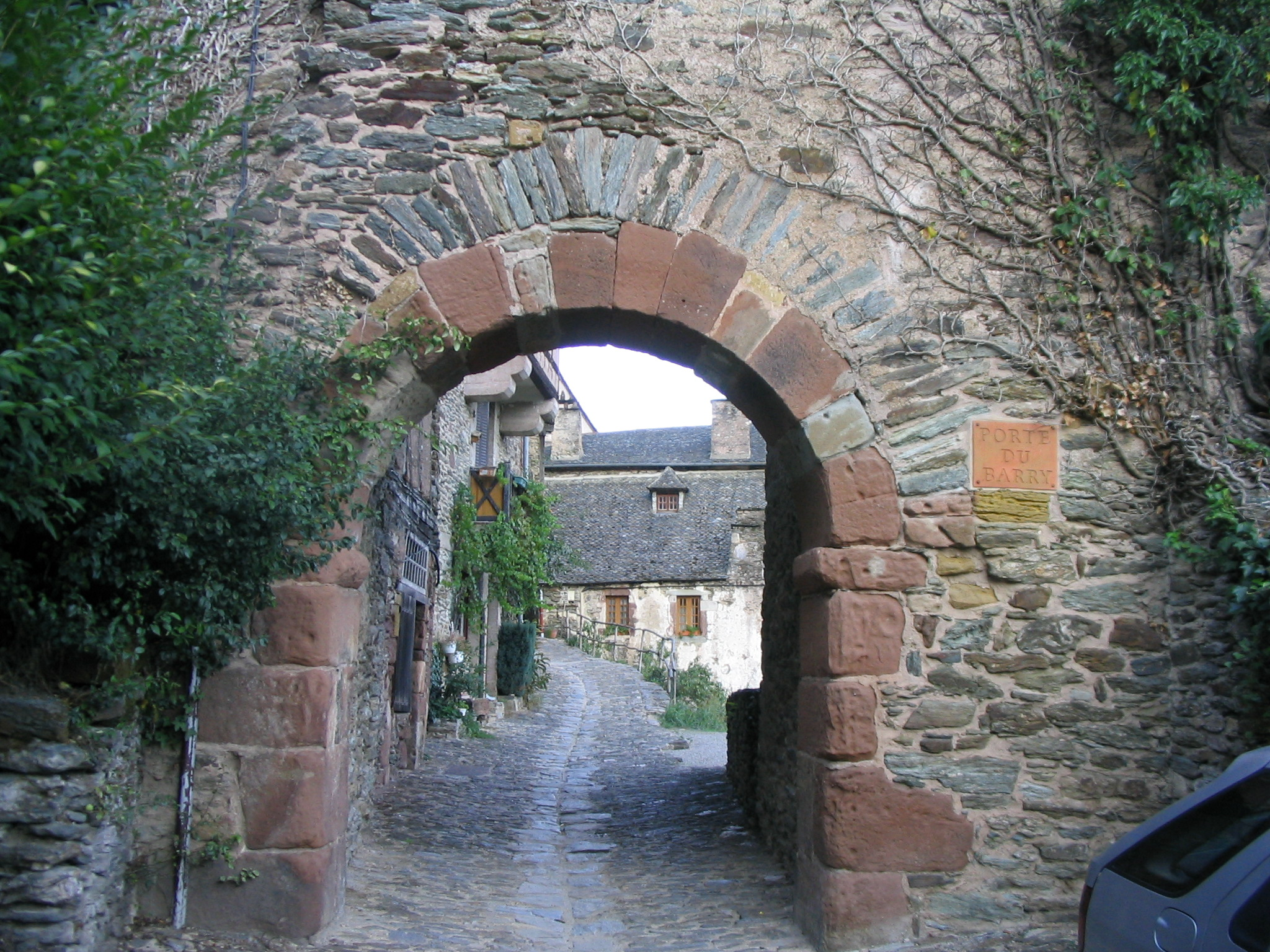
Entrance gate to Conques - the Port du Barry

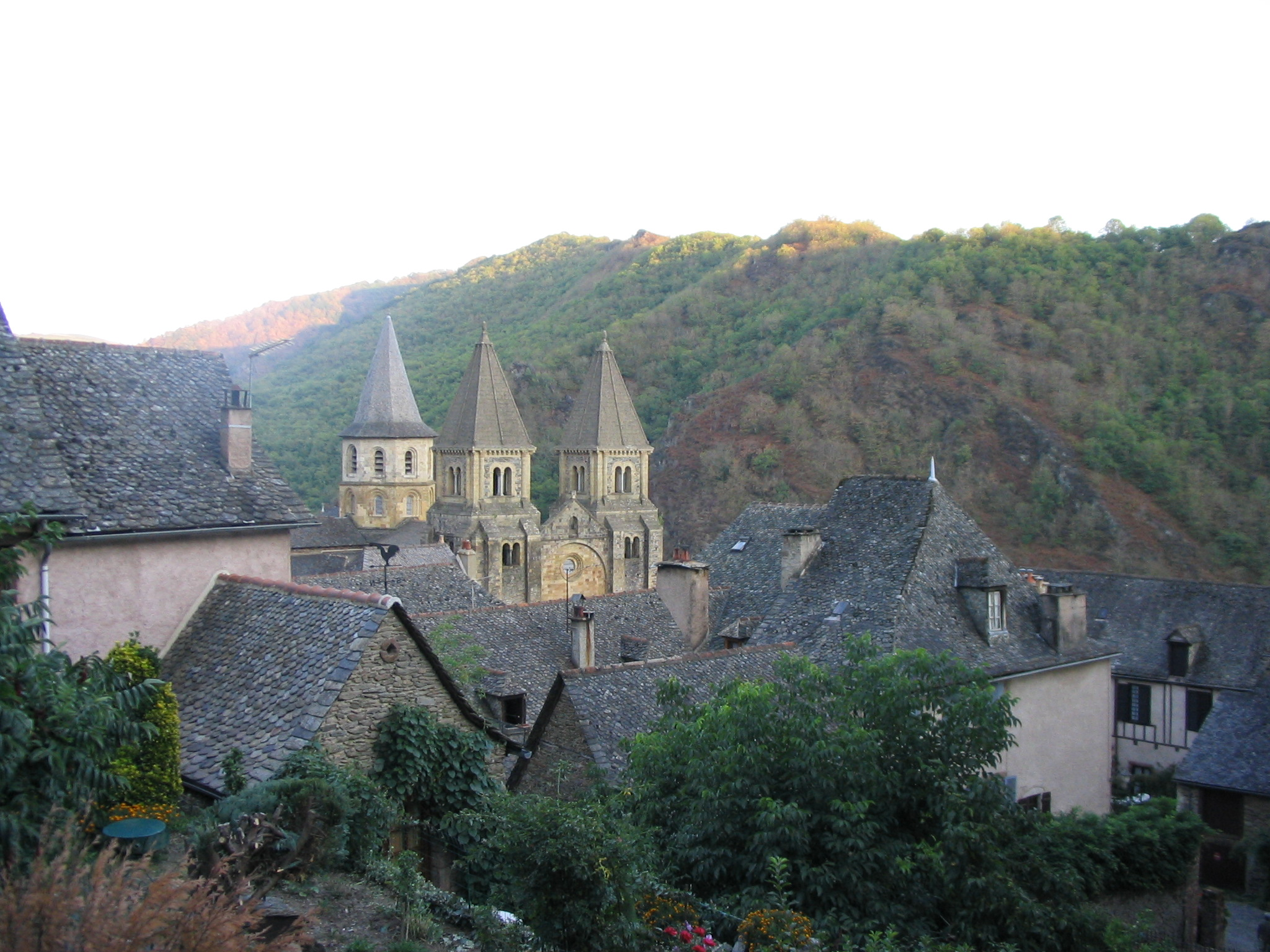
Conques rooftop vista

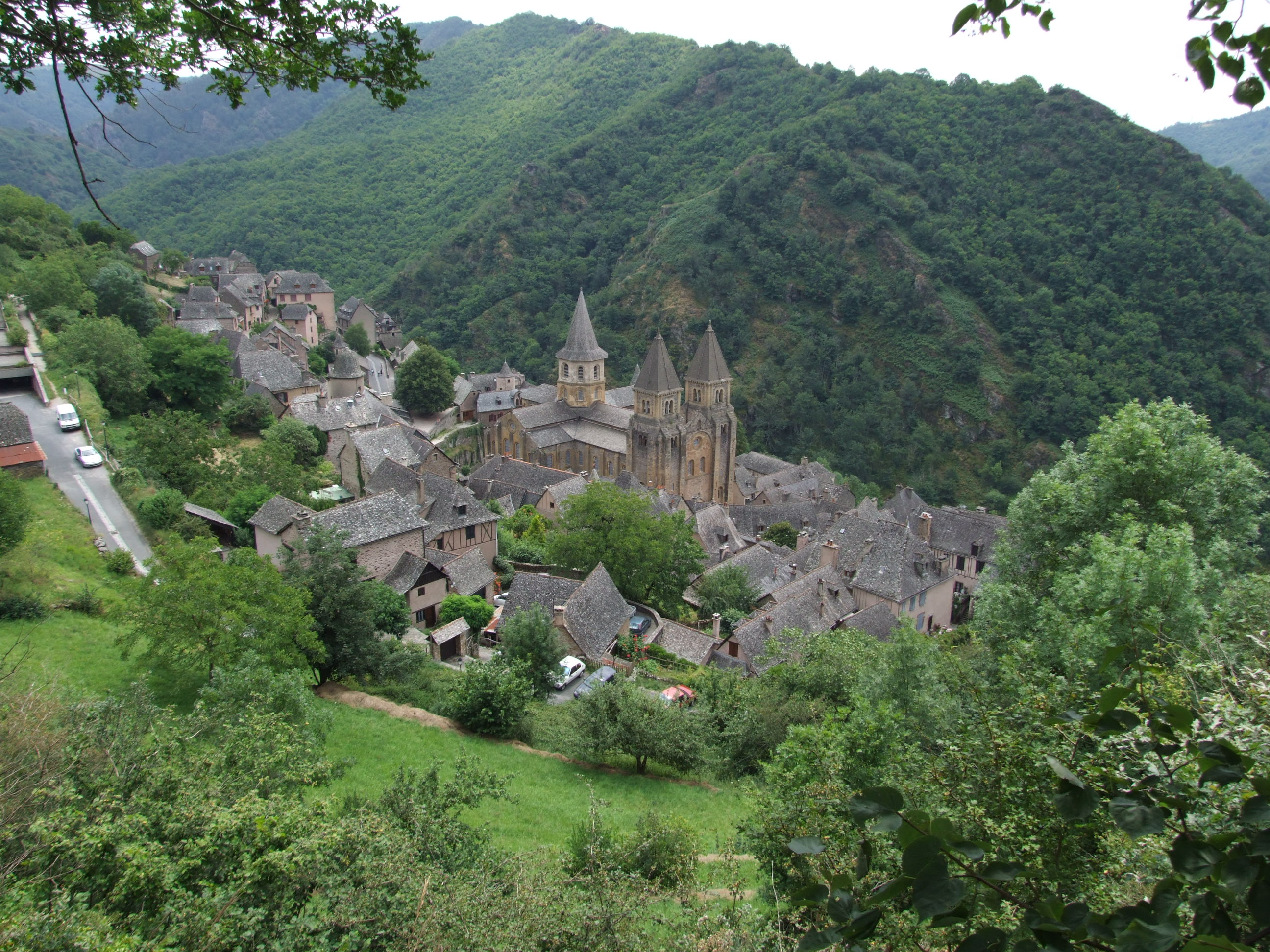
Conques panorama

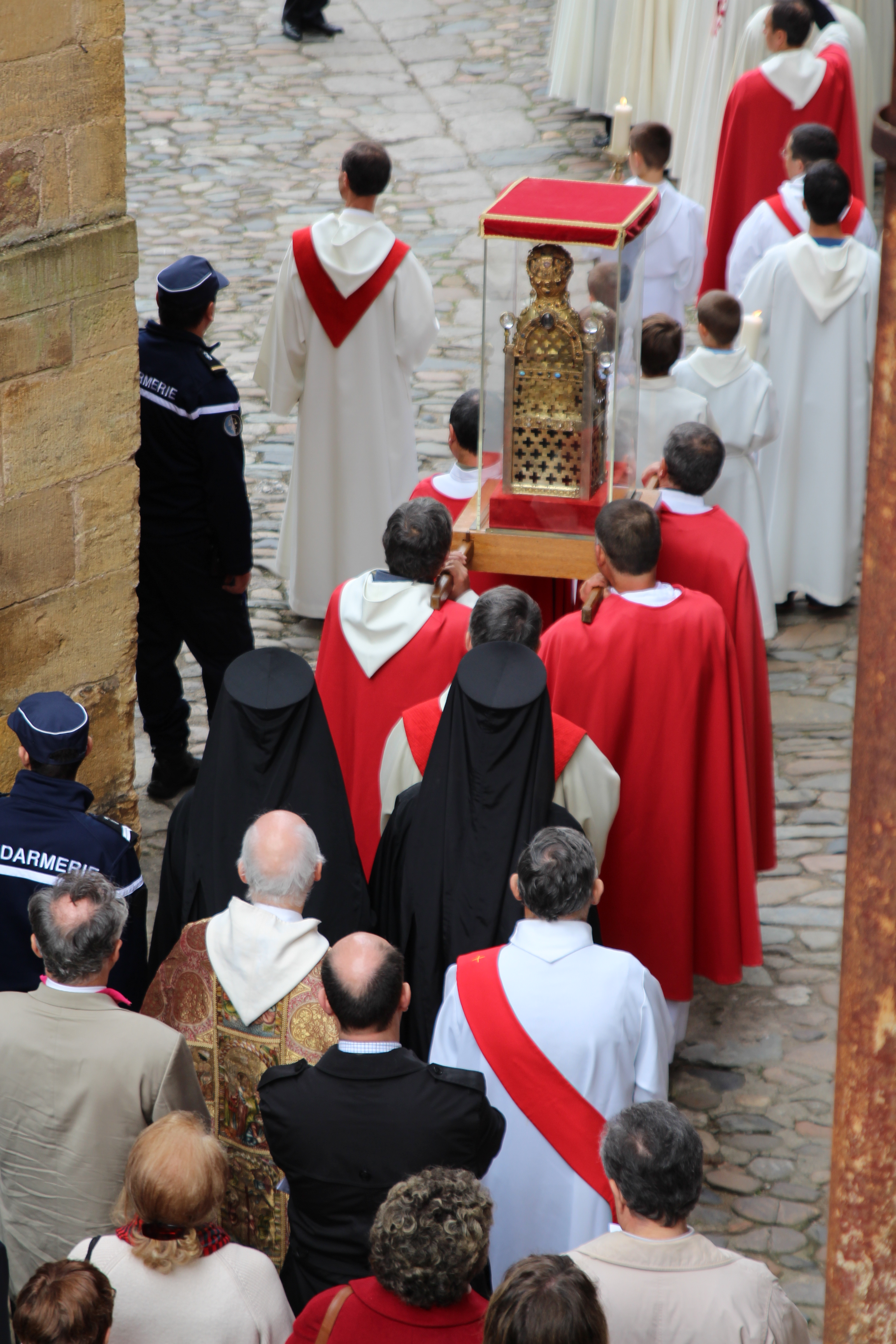
Procession on Saint-Foy day in Conques on 6 October 2013

== See also ==
- Communes of the Aveyron department
