= Dourdou =

Dourdou may refer to the following rivers:

- Dourdou de Camarès, tributary of the Tarn in southern France
- Dourdou de Conques, tributary of the Lot in southern France
