= Flagnac =

Commune in Occitanie, France

- Commune
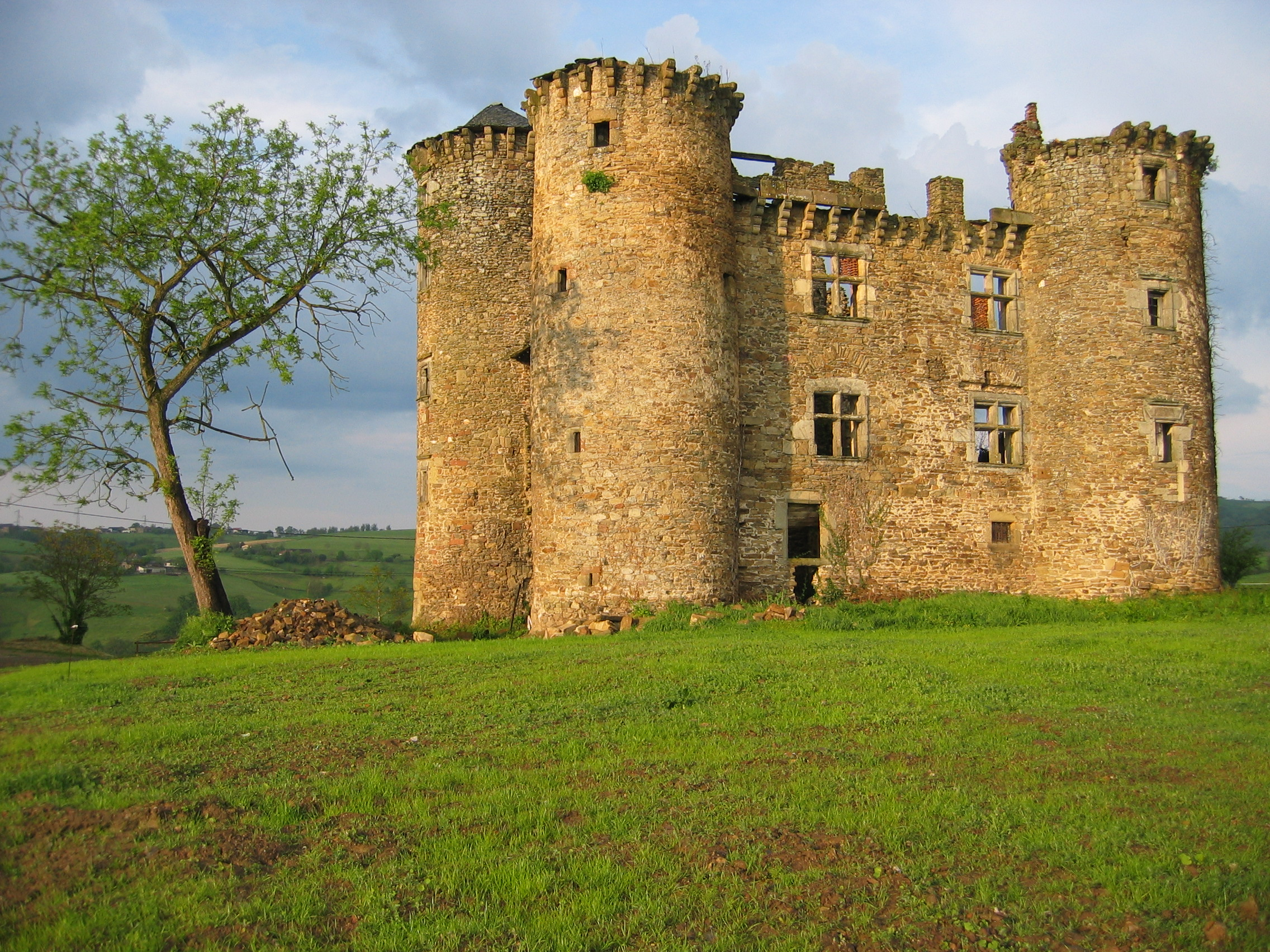
- Chateau of Pagax
- Location of Flagnac
- Location within France Location within Occitanie
- Coordinates: 44°36′30″N 2°15′07″E
- Country: France
- Region: Occitania
- Department: Aveyron
- Arrondissement: Villefranche-de-Rouergue
- Canton: Lot et Dourdou
- Intercommunality: Decazeville Communauté

Government
  - Mayor (2022–2026): Olivier Lantuejoul
- Area^{1}: 12.93 km^{2} (4.99 sq mi)
- Elevation: 275 m (902 ft)
- Highest elevation: 466 m (1,529 ft)
- Lowest elevation: 180 m (590 ft)
- Population (2023): 1,084
  - Density: 83.84/km^{2} (217.1/sq mi)
- Time zone: UTC+01:00 (CET)
  - Summer (DST): UTC+02:00 (CEST)
- INSEE/Postal code: 12101 /12300
- ^{1} French Land Register data, which excludes lakes, ponds, glaciers > 1 km^{2} (0.386 sq mi or 247 acres) and river estuaries.

Flagnac (French pronunciation: [flaɲak]; Occitan: Flanhac) is a commune in the Aveyron department in southern France. Flagnac is home to the Château de Pagax which has been considered a historical monument since 1978. The Lot river flows directly through the commune and has historically been the source of local flooding.

== Population ==
Historical population
Year	Pop.	±% p.a.
1968	788	—
1975	902	+1.95%
1982	988	+1.31%
1990	905	−1.09%
1999	888	−0.21%
2007	935	+0.65%
2012	1,035	+2.05%
2017	1,060	+0.48%
2023	1,084	+0.37%
Source: INSEE

== See also ==
- Communes of the Aveyron department
