= Cassan =

Cassan may refer to:

- Cassan Abbey, Aveyron, France
- Fiachrae Cássan, a legendary king of Ireland
- Gabriel Cassan (1884–1942), French cyclist
- Kashan, Iran
