= Dourdou de Conques =

River in southern France

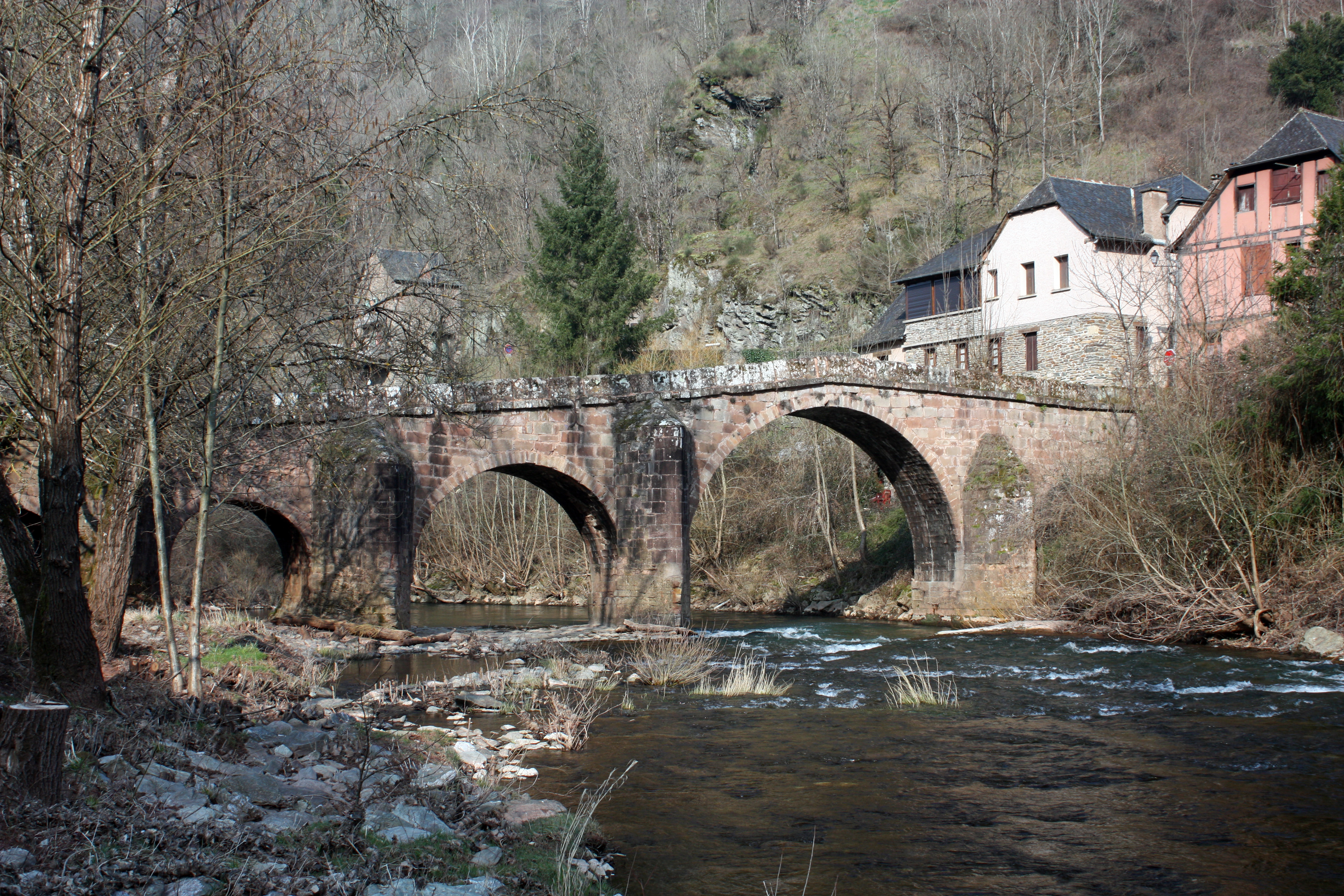
- Old bridge in Conques

- Location within France Location within Occitanie

Location
- Country: France

Physical characteristics
- Source
  - location: in Lassouts
  - coordinates: 44.4872°N 2.8577°E
- Mouth
  - location: Lot
  - coordinates: 44.6357°N 2.3532°E
- Length: 83.7 km (52.0 mi)
- Basin size: 601 km^{2} (232 sq mi)

Basin features
- Progression: Lot→ Garonne→ Gironde estuary→ Atlantic Ocean

The Dourdou de Conques (French pronunciation: [duʁdu də kɔ̃k], Dourdou of Conques) is an 83.7 km (52.0 mi) long river in the department of Aveyron, southern France. Its source is near the village of Lassouts. It flows generally west. It is a left tributary of the Lot, into which it flows near Grand-Vabre.

== Communes along its course ==
The following list is ordered from source to mouth:

- Aveyron: Lassouts, Palmas-d'Aveyron, Gabriac, Bozouls, Rodelle, Muret-le-Château, Villecomtal, Pruines, Mouret, Nauviale, Conques-en-Rouergue
