= Gabriel Cassan =

French cyclist

Personal information
- Full name: Etienne Gabriel Cassan
- Born: 7 January 1884 Boisse-Penchot, France
- Died: 3 March 1942 (aged 58) Bolougne, France

Cycling career
- Sport: Cycling
- Discipline: Road
- Role: Rider

Etienne Gabriel Cassan (7 January 1884 – 3 March 1942) was a French racing cyclist. He rode in the 1909 Paris–Roubaix. He and his wife died in a British air raid in 1942 during World War II.
