= Seyssel, Haute-Savoie =

Seyssel Sèssél (Arpitan)
- Commune
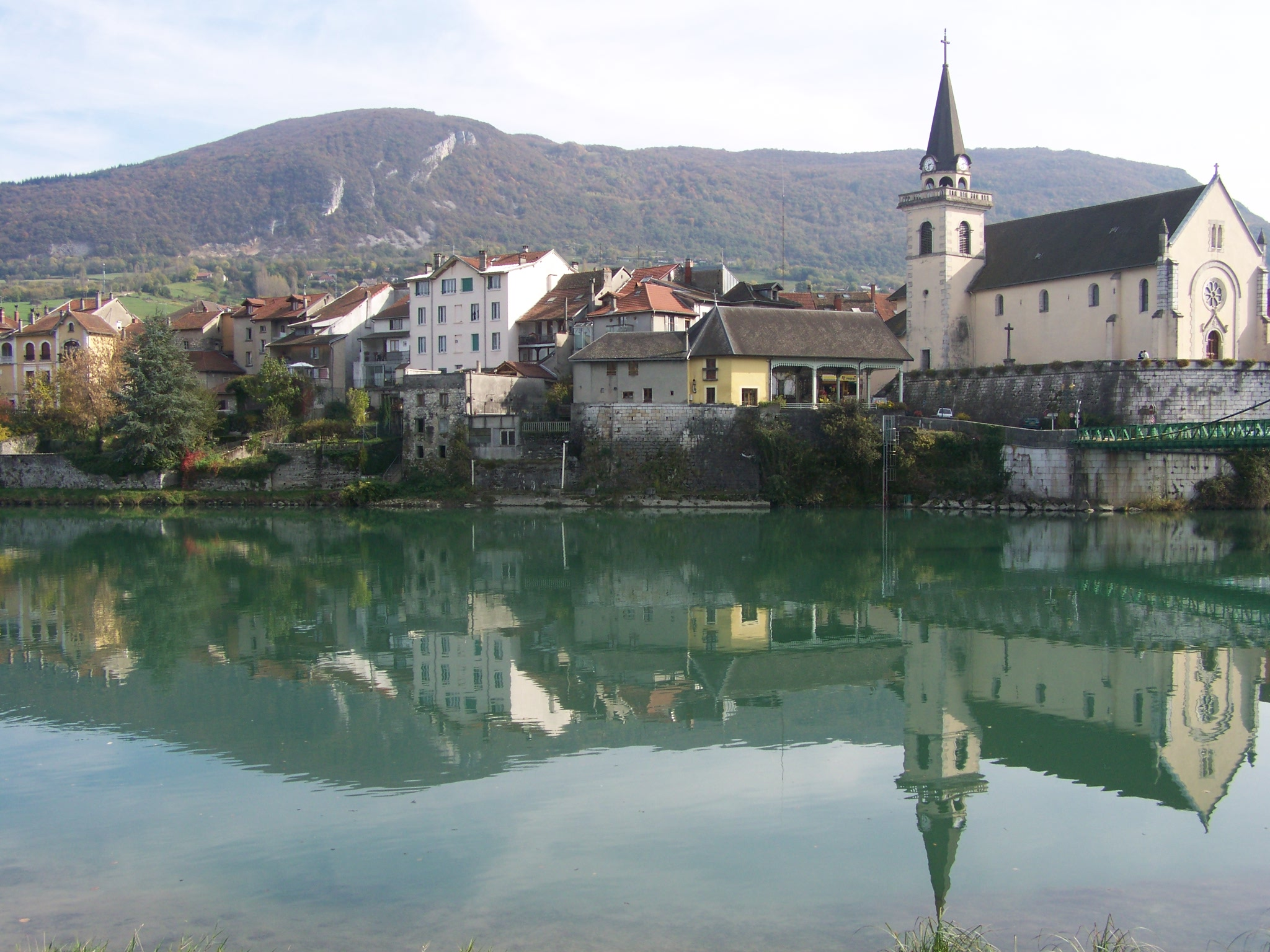
- The village seen from the West

- Coat of arms
- Location of Seyssel
- Location within France Location within Auvergne-Rhône-Alpes
- Coordinates: 45°57′35″N 5°50′14″E
- Country: France
- Region: Auvergne-Rhône-Alpes
- Department: Haute-Savoie
- Arrondissement: Saint-Julien-en-Genevois
- Canton: Saint-Julien-en-Genevois
- Intercommunality: CC Usses et Rhône

Government
  - Mayor (2020–2026): Gérard Lambert
- Area^{1}: 16.86 km^{2} (6.51 sq mi)
- Elevation: 265 m (869 ft)
- Highest elevation: 937 m (3,074 ft)
- Lowest elevation: 250 m (820 ft)
- Population (2023): 2,321
  - Density: 137.7/km^{2} (356.5/sq mi)
- Time zone: UTC+01:00 (CET)
  - Summer (DST): UTC+02:00 (CEST)
- INSEE/Postal code: 74269 /74910
- ^{1} French Land Register data, which excludes lakes, ponds, glaciers > 1 km^{2} (0.386 sq mi or 247 acres) and river estuaries.

Seyssel (French pronunciation: [sɛsɛl]; Arpitan: Sèssél) is a commune in the Haute-Savoie department in the Auvergne-Rhône-Alpes region in south-eastern France.

The part of the town across the Rhône is also named Seyssel but located on the western bank of the Rhône in the Ain department. It is a rare case in France of two homonymous communes adjacent to each other, similar to the situation of the village of Saint-Santin, divided between the communes of Saint-Santin (Aveyron) and Saint-Santin-de-Maurs (Cantal).

== Geography ==
The Fier forms most of the commune's southern border, then flows into the Rhône, which forms the commune's western border.

== Population ==
Historical population
Year	Pop.	±% p.a.
1968	1,717	—
1975	1,725	+0.07%
1982	1,558	−1.44%
1990	1,630	+0.57%
1999	1,793	+1.06%
2007	2,069	+1.81%
2012	2,295	+2.09%
2017	2,325	+0.26%
2023	2,321	−0.03%
Source: INSEE

== See also ==
- Communes of the Haute-Savoie department
- List of medieval bridges in France
