= Sénergues =

Commune in Occitanie, France

- Commune
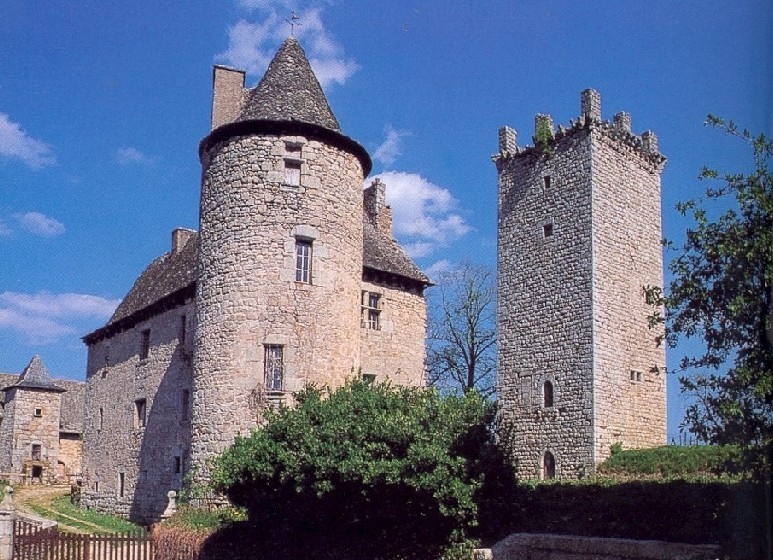
- The chateau in Sénergues
- Location of Sénergues
- Location within France Location within Occitanie
- Coordinates: 44°36′24″N 2°29′08″E
- Country: France
- Region: Occitania
- Department: Aveyron
- Arrondissement: Rodez
- Canton: Lot et Dourdou

Government
  - Mayor (2020–2026): Daniel Joulia
- Area^{1}: 44.9 km^{2} (17.3 sq mi)
- Elevation: 550 m (1,800 ft)
- Highest elevation: 664 m (2,178 ft)
- Lowest elevation: 188 m (617 ft)
- Population (2023): 423
  - Density: 9.42/km^{2} (24.4/sq mi)
- Time zone: UTC+01:00 (CET)
  - Summer (DST): UTC+02:00 (CEST)
- INSEE/Postal code: 12268 /12320
- ^{1} French Land Register data, which excludes lakes, ponds, glaciers > 1 km^{2} (0.386 sq mi or 247 acres) and river estuaries.

Sénergues (French pronunciation: [senɛʁg]; Languedocien: Senèrgas) is a commune in the Aveyron department in southern France.

== Population ==
Historical population
Year	Pop.	±% p.a.
1968	898	—
1975	815	−1.38%
1982	732	−1.52%
1990	608	−2.29%
1999	545	−1.21%
2007	494	−1.22%
2012	443	−2.16%
2017	421	−1.01%
2023	423	+0.08%
Source: INSEE

== See also ==
- Communes of the Aveyron department
