= Château de Pagax =

- Rouergue (now Aveyron)
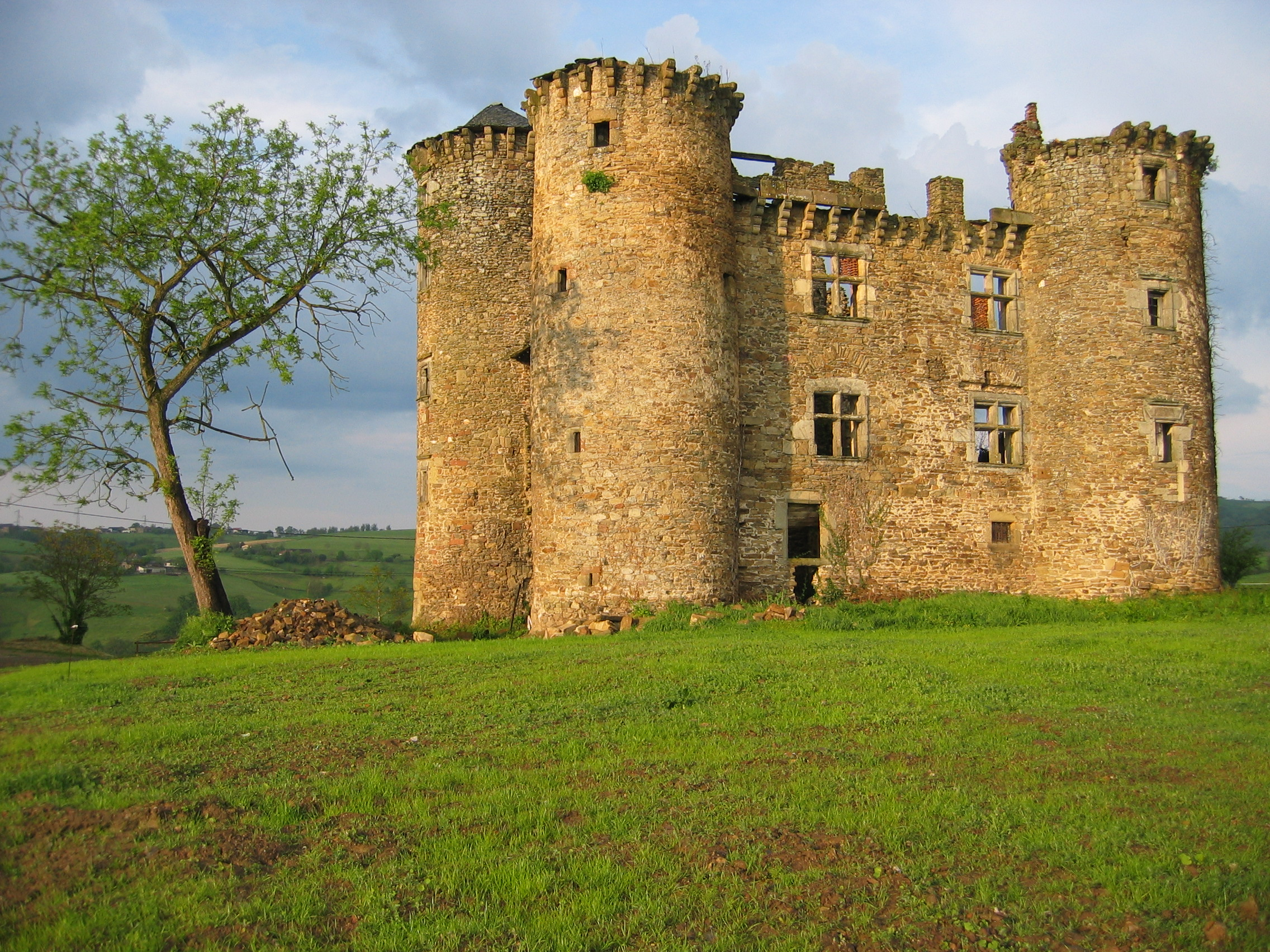

Location
- Coordinates: 44°36′30″N 2°15′07″E

The château de Pagax is located in the ancient province of Rouergue. It dominates the valley of the River Lot.

== Architecture ==
The architecture is typical of fortresses built between the 12th and 14th centuries. The main building is square with a tower at each of its corners and stands 3 storeys high. The castle was remodelled in the Renaissance, and large mullioned windows were added. A chapel dedicated to Saint Peter was founded in 1327.

== History ==
The castle was first mentioned in 1259. It was originally owned by a royal official, built to support the authority of the King of France in the region. Pagax was formerly written Pagas and still today it is pronounced "Pagasse". Pagas, from the Latin "Pagus", fiscal, payment, means a point of passage. In the Middle Ages it was under the control of the powerful Montarnal family.

Château de Pagax descended to the Moret family through marriage in the 15th century.

== Gallery ==
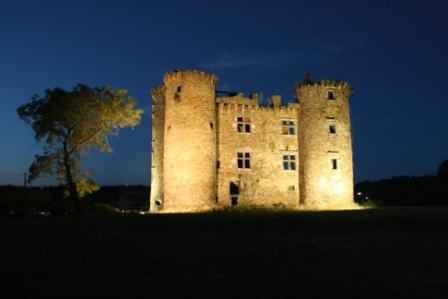

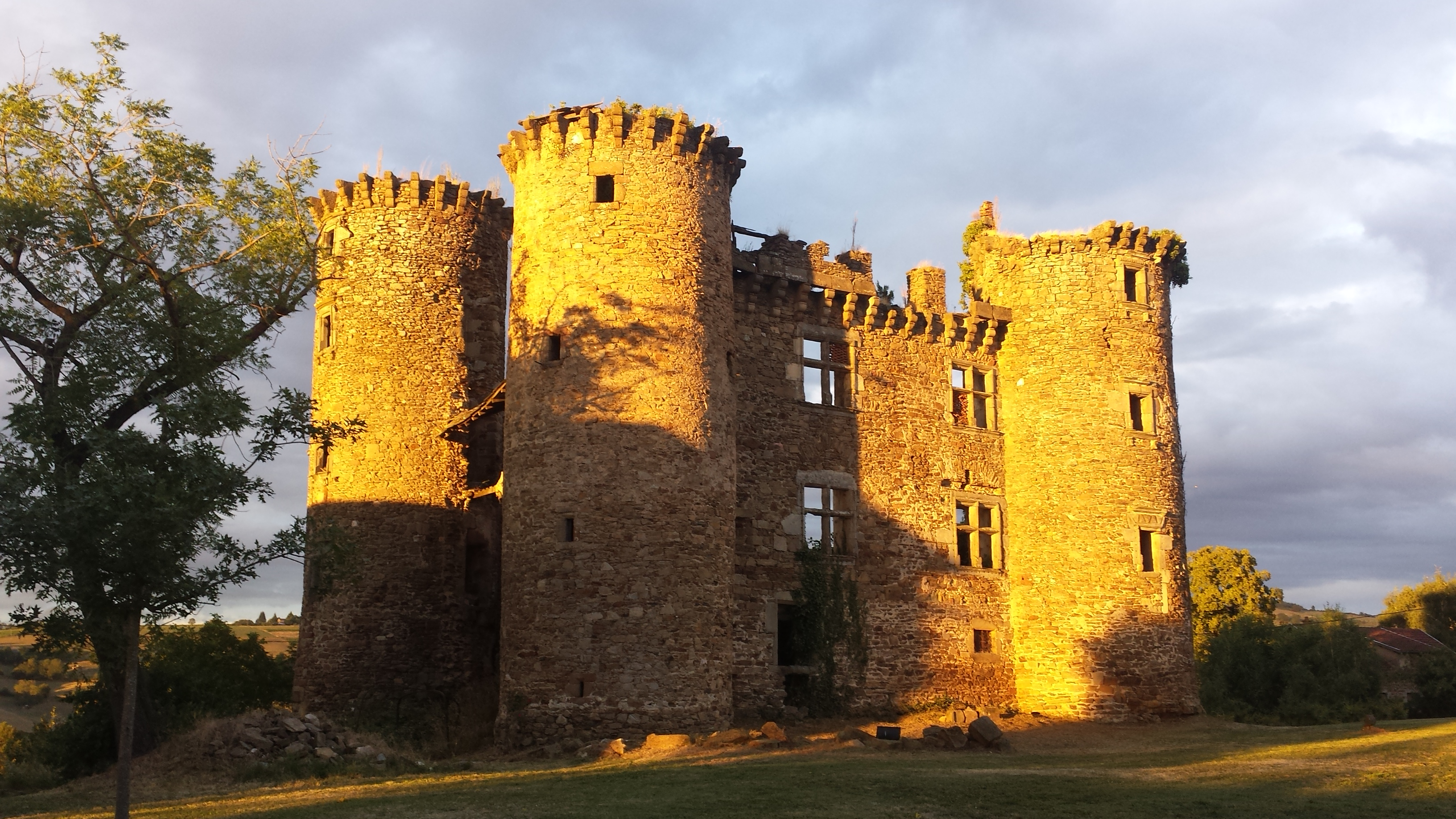

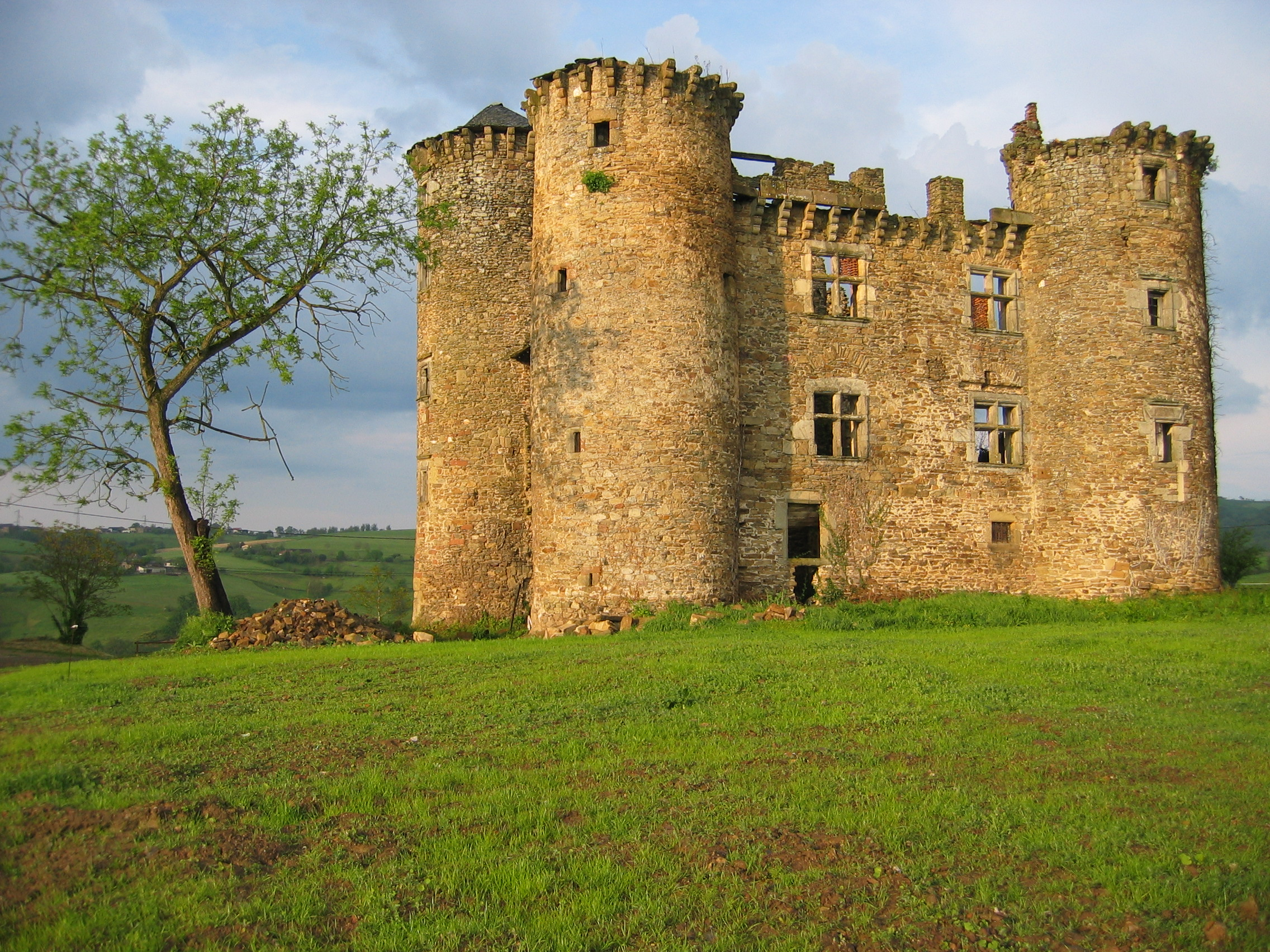

== See also ==
- List of monuments historiques in Aveyron
