= Conques-en-Rouergue =

Commune in Occitanie, France

- Commune
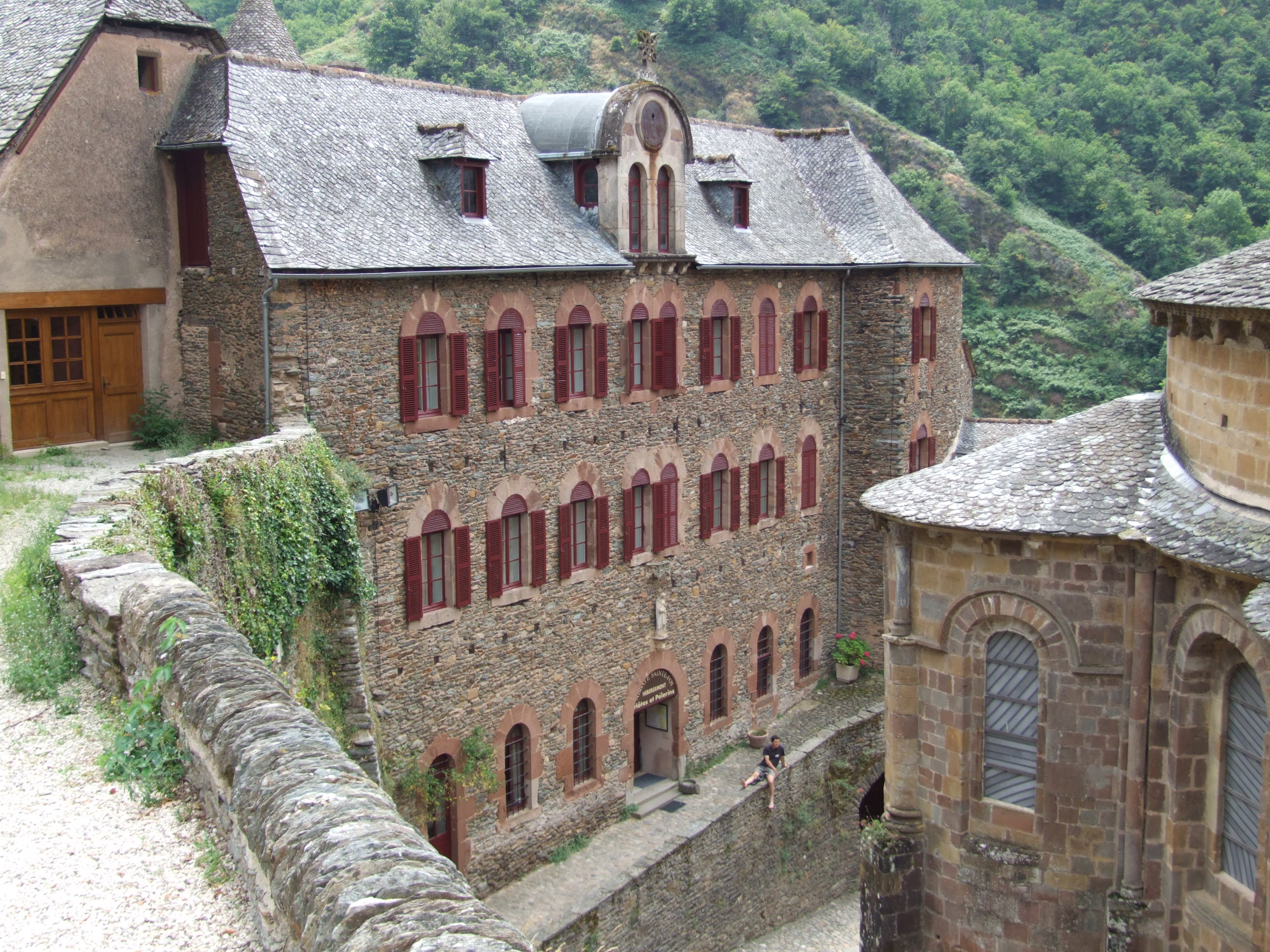
- Location of Conques-en-Rouergue
- Location within France Location within Occitanie
- Coordinates: 44°35′56″N 2°23′53″E
- Country: France
- Region: Occitania
- Department: Aveyron
- Arrondissement: Rodez
- Canton: Lot et Dourdou

Government
  - Mayor (2024–2026): Davy Lagrange
- Area^{1}: 106.23 km^{2} (41.02 sq mi)
- Population (2023): 1,540
  - Density: 14.5/km^{2} (37.5/sq mi)
- Time zone: UTC+01:00 (CET)
  - Summer (DST): UTC+02:00 (CEST)
- INSEE/Postal code: 12218 /12320
- ^{1} French Land Register data, which excludes lakes, ponds, glaciers > 1 km^{2} (0.386 sq mi or 247 acres) and river estuaries.

Conques-en-Rouergue (French pronunciation: [kɔ̃k ɑ̃ ʁwɛʁɡ], literally Conques in Rouergue; Occitan: Concas de Roergue) is a commune in the department of Aveyron, southern France. It lies on the Lot river. The municipality was established on 1 January 2016 by merger of the former communes of Conques, Grand-Vabre, Noailhac and Saint-Cyprien-sur-Dourdou.

== See also ==
- Communes of the Aveyron department
