= Bozouls =

Commune in the French department of Aveyron

- Commune
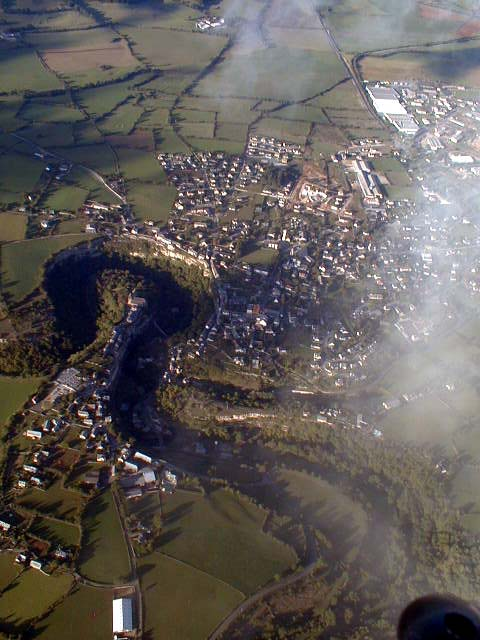
- An aerial view of Bozouls

- Coat of arms
- Location of Bozouls
- Location within France Location within Occitanie
- Coordinates: 44°28′17″N 2°43′17″E
- Country: France
- Region: Occitania
- Department: Aveyron
- Arrondissement: Rodez
- Canton: Causse-Comtal

Government
  - Mayor (2020–2026): Jean-Luc Calmelly
- Area^{1}: 69.69 km^{2} (26.91 sq mi)
- Elevation: 640 m (2,100 ft)
- Highest elevation: 711 m (2,333 ft)
- Lowest elevation: 355 m (1,165 ft)
- Population (2023): 3,001
  - Density: 43.06/km^{2} (111.5/sq mi)
- Time zone: UTC+01:00 (CET)
  - Summer (DST): UTC+02:00 (CEST)
- INSEE/Postal code: 12033 /12340
- ^{1} French Land Register data, which excludes lakes, ponds, glaciers > 1 km^{2} (0.386 sq mi or 247 acres) and river estuaries.

Bozouls (French pronunciation: [bozul]; Occitan: Boason or Bòsols) is a commune in the French department of Aveyron, in Occitania.

It is located on Route Maquis de Jean Pierre (D20), 23 kilometers northeast of Rodez.

It sits on the edge of a gorge created by the river Dourdou de Conques.

Bozouls is the setting of the 2024 neo-noir television series Monsieur Spade from AMC and Canal+.

== Population ==
Historical population
Year	Pop.	±% p.a.
1968	1,701	—
1975	1,817	+0.95%
1982	2,032	+1.61%
1990	2,060	+0.17%
1999	2,329	+1.37%
2007	2,759	+2.14%
2012	2,742	−0.12%
2017	2,871	+0.92%
2023	3,001	+0.74%
Source: INSEE

== Notable people and residents in Bozouls ==
- Richard Belzer – American actor

== See also ==
- Communes of the Aveyron department
