= Livinhac-le-Haut =

Commune in Occitanie, France

- Commune
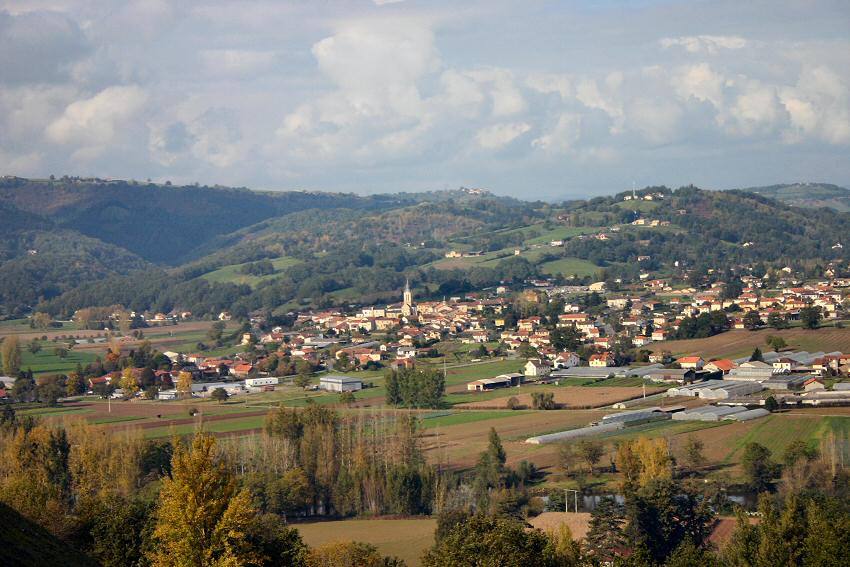
- A general view of Livinhac-le-Haut
- Location of Livinhac-le-Haut
- Location within France Location within Occitanie
- Coordinates: 44°35′32″N 2°14′06″E
- Country: France
- Region: Occitania
- Department: Aveyron
- Arrondissement: Villefranche-de-Rouergue
- Canton: Lot et Dourdou

Government
  - Mayor (2020–2026): Roland Joffre
- Area^{1}: 10.97 km^{2} (4.24 sq mi)
- Elevation: 200 m (660 ft)
- Highest elevation: 472 m (1,549 ft)
- Lowest elevation: 169 m (554 ft)
- Population (2023): 1,091
  - Density: 99.45/km^{2} (257.6/sq mi)
- Time zone: UTC+01:00 (CET)
  - Summer (DST): UTC+02:00 (CEST)
- INSEE/Postal code: 12130 /12300
- ^{1} French Land Register data, which excludes lakes, ponds, glaciers > 1 km^{2} (0.386 sq mi or 247 acres) and river estuaries.

Livinhac-le-Haut (from Latin Livinius, name of the Roman general who had a camp in (ac) the area) is a commune in the Aveyron department in southern France.

== Population ==
Historical population
Year	Pop.	±% p.a.
1968	1,423	—
1975	1,384	−0.40%
1982	1,320	−0.67%
1990	1,179	−1.40%
1999	1,126	−0.51%
2007	1,068	−0.66%
2012	1,199	+2.34%
2017	1,123	−1.30%
2023	1,091	−0.48%
Source: INSEE

== Personalities ==
Livinhac-Le-Haut is the birthplace of several great thinkers and philosophers:

- Pierre Laromiguiere (1756–1837) was amongst other things a member of the Academy of Moral and Political Science.
- Prosper Alfaric (1876–1955) started as a priest then left the church. He taught history of religions at Strasbourg University and was a member of the Union rationaliste.
- Camille Couderc (1860–1933) archivist at la Bibliothèque Nationale, professor of bibliographie ecole des Chartes, president of the Societe des lettres, Science et Art de l'Aveyron.

== Sights ==
Livinhac used to be known as the garden of the Aveyron because of its fertile fields by the beautiful river Lot and was famous for its suspension bridge built at the beginning of the 19th century when the neighbouring town of Decazeville developed as an important industrial town because of its coal mines.

== See also ==
- Communes of the Aveyron department
