= Saint-Félix-de-Lunel =

Commune in Occitanie, France

- Commune
- Coat of arms
- Location of Saint-Félix-de-Lunel
- Location within France Location within Occitanie
- Coordinates: 44°33′46″N 2°32′22″E
- Country: France
- Region: Occitania
- Department: Aveyron
- Arrondissement: Rodez
- Canton: Lot et Dourdou

Government
  - Mayor (2020–2026): Guy Visseq
- Area^{1}: 18.98 km^{2} (7.33 sq mi)
- Elevation: 600 m (2,000 ft)
- Highest elevation: 684 m (2,244 ft)
- Lowest elevation: 388 m (1,273 ft)
- Population (2023): 387
  - Density: 20.4/km^{2} (52.8/sq mi)
- Time zone: UTC+01:00 (CET)
  - Summer (DST): UTC+02:00 (CEST)
- INSEE/Postal code: 12221 /12320
- ^{1} French Land Register data, which excludes lakes, ponds, glaciers > 1 km^{2} (0.386 sq mi or 247 acres) and river estuaries.

Saint-Félix-de-Lunel (Languedocien: Sant Faliç) is a commune in the Aveyron department in southern France.

== Population ==
Historical population
Year	Pop.	±% p.a.
1968	481	—
1975	472	−0.27%
1982	466	−0.18%
1990	430	−1.00%
1999	401	−0.77%
2007	387	−0.44%
2012	414	+1.36%
2017	347	−3.47%
2023	387	+1.83%
Source: INSEE

== See also ==
- Communes of the Aveyron department
