= Lot (river) =

River in France

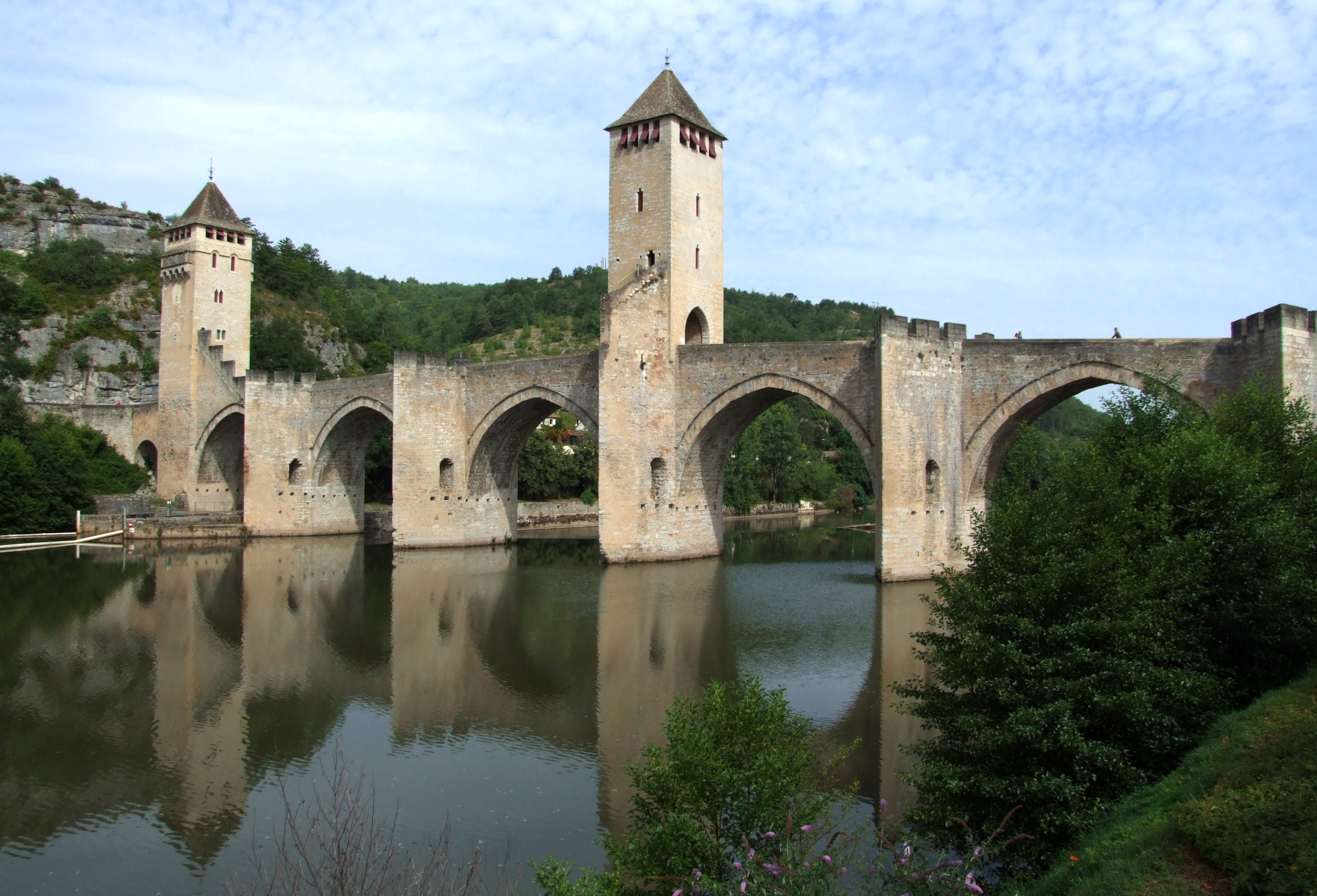
- Pont Valentré in Cahors

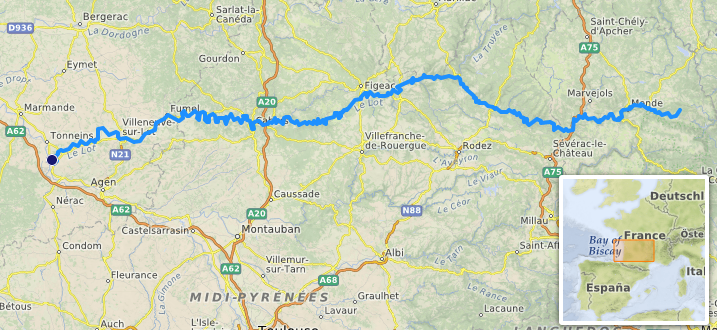

Location
- Country: France

Physical characteristics
- Source
  - location: Cévennes
  - coordinates: 44.51493°N 3.78462°E
  - elevation: 1,499 m (4,918 ft)
- Mouth
  - location: Garonne
  - coordinates: 44°19′0″N 0°20′6″E
- Length: 485 km (301 mi)
- Basin size: 11,254 km^{2} (4,345 mi^{2})
- Discharge
  - average: 155 m^{3}/s (5,500 cu ft/s)

Basin features
- Progression: Garonne→ Gironde estuary→ Atlantic Ocean

The Lot (pronounced [lɔt]), originally the Olt (Occitan: Òlt; Latin: Oltis), is a river in France. It is a right-bank tributary of the Garonne. It rises in the Cévennes mountains, flowing west through Quercy, where it flows into the Garonne near Aiguillon, a total distance of 485 kilometres (301 mi). It gives its name to the départements of Lot and Lot-et-Garonne.

The Lot is prone to flooding in the winter and spring, and has many dams in its upper catchment area, mainly on the Truyère, which produce hydroelectric power of strategic importance for the French national grid. Turbining can cause additional variations in flow throughout the 275 km of the river that has been extensively developed as an asset for tourism in the region. The major project to restore navigability of the river Lot was conceived by local stakeholders in Decazeville and Cahors in the 1970s. It meant restoring the many locks, and bypassing the medium-head dams built at five locations along the former waterway.

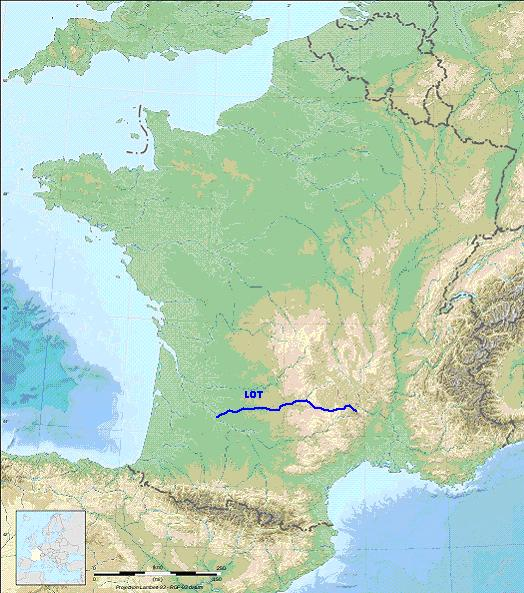
Course of the river Lot (from French page), showing how it rises deep in the Massif Central

Olt is also the name of a river in Romania (Romanian: Olt; German: Alt; Latin: Aluta or Alutus, Turkish: Oltu, Ancient Greek: Ἄλυτος Alytos).

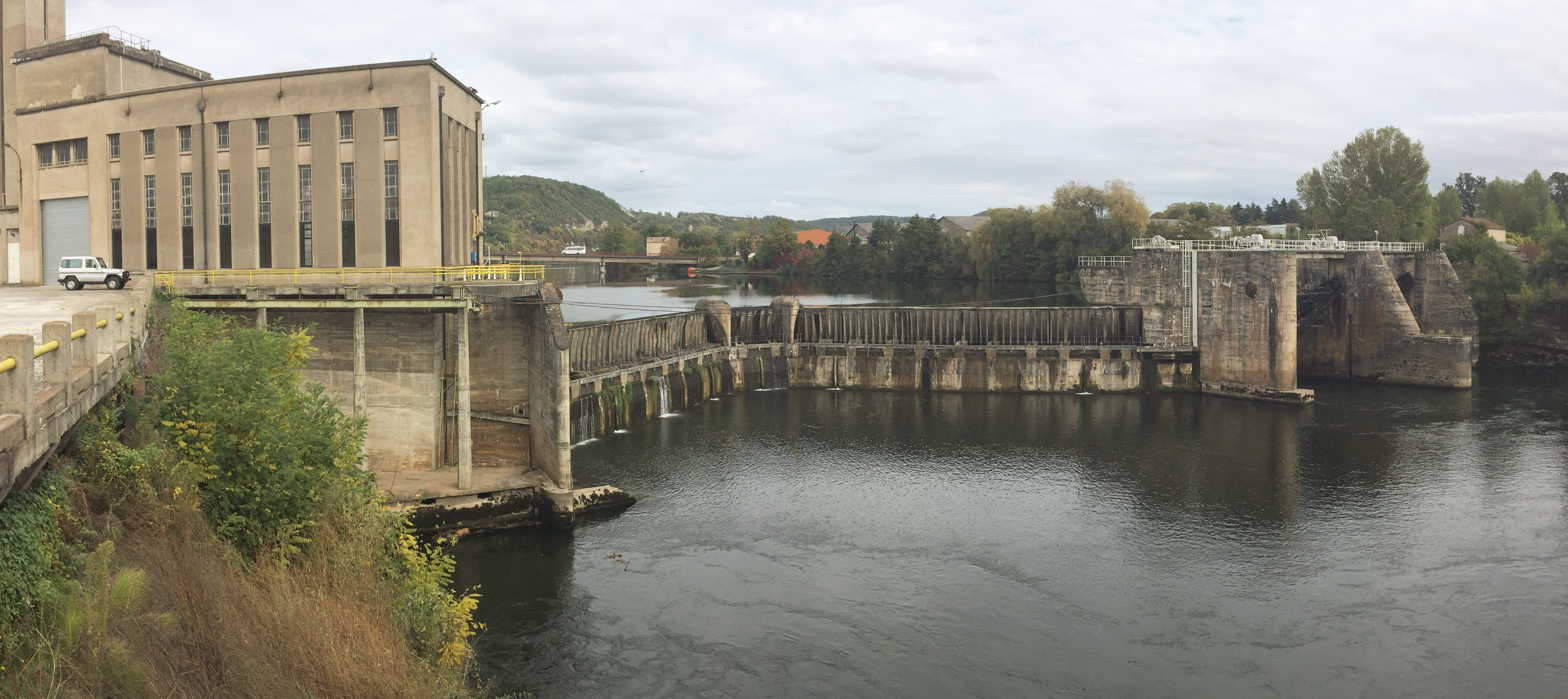
Different possibilities for bypassing the dam in Fumel, to provide continuity of navigation on the Lower Lot, are still under study

== Main tributaries ==
- Lède (near Villeneuve-sur-Lot)
- Célé (near Cabrerets)
- Dourdou de Conques (in Grand-Vabre)
- Truyère (in Entraygues-sur-Truyère)
- Colagne (in Le Monastier-Pin-Moriès)

== Departments and towns ==
The Lot flows through the following départements and towns: Lozère (Mende), Cantal, Aveyron (Entraygues-sur-Truyère, Flagnac, Capdenac-Gare), Lot (Cahors) and Lot-et-Garonne (Villeneuve-sur-Lot, Aiguillon).

== Navigation ==
From the Middle Ages flat-bottomed gabarres traded between Entraygues and the Garonne, a distance of 297 km. In the late 17th century Jean-Baptiste Colbert ordered improvements to navigation. A second phase of canalisation became necessary when the open-cast coal mines in Decazeville started supplying coal to fuel the industrial revolution, from 1840. About 75 weirs (chaussées) and locks were built over the 270 km up to Bouquiès near Decazeville. Barges continued to ply the river after the first railway was opened from Montauban to Capdenac in 1858. Canals were then built to bypass the river’s meanders at Luzech, Cajarc, Montbrun and Capdenac. The short reprieve for river navigation came to end when the railway was opened along the valley in sections from 1869. The navigation was abandoned in 1926. An association was founded by Christian Bernad in 1971 to promote restoration for tourism. A study to assess the feasibility of developing waterway tourism on the river was undertaken in 1985-86, and led to the first 64 km length being restored and opened in 1990. The Lot is now open to recreational navigation and passenger boats in three sections, with long-term plans to interconnect them currently floundering for lack of political support and funding.

=== The Lower River Lot ===
The lower river Lot is a 120 km (74.5 mi) route from Nicole to Albas, currently with 17 locks restored, but a gap of 3 km from PK 76-79, where one lock remains to be restored, and a lock or other structure to bypass the dam at Fumel. Development of boat traffic on the river has been affected by poor conditions of navigation on the Garonne, to be crossed over a length of 5 km to gain access to the entrance lock at Nicole.

=== The Central River Lot ===
This central river Lot is a 74 km (46 mi) route, with 17 locks, from Luzech to Larnagol. The length originally reopened in May 1990 was 64 km long, to Crégols above Saint-Cirq-Lapopie. It was extended in 2008.

=== The Upper River Lot ===
The upper river Lot is a short length of 11 km (7 mi) in the département Aveyron, from la Roque-Bouillac in the commune of Livinhac-le-Haut to Port d'Agrès in the commune of Saint-Parthem, including two restored locks and a completely new lock beside the hydroelectric plant at Marcenac.

The industrial history of the river weighs heavily on today's development, since pollution has left heavy metals in the silt at locations such as Fumel (Lower Lot) and Bouillac (Upper Lot). Costly processes are required to remove these sediments, as a prerequisite for continuing restoration works on the river. The current situation with the three separate navigable sections is likely to continue into the foreseeable future.

== See also ==
- List of canals in France
- List of rivers of France
- Olt river in Romania
