= Seyssel, Ain =

Commune in Auvergne-Rhône-Alpes, France

Seyssel
- Commune
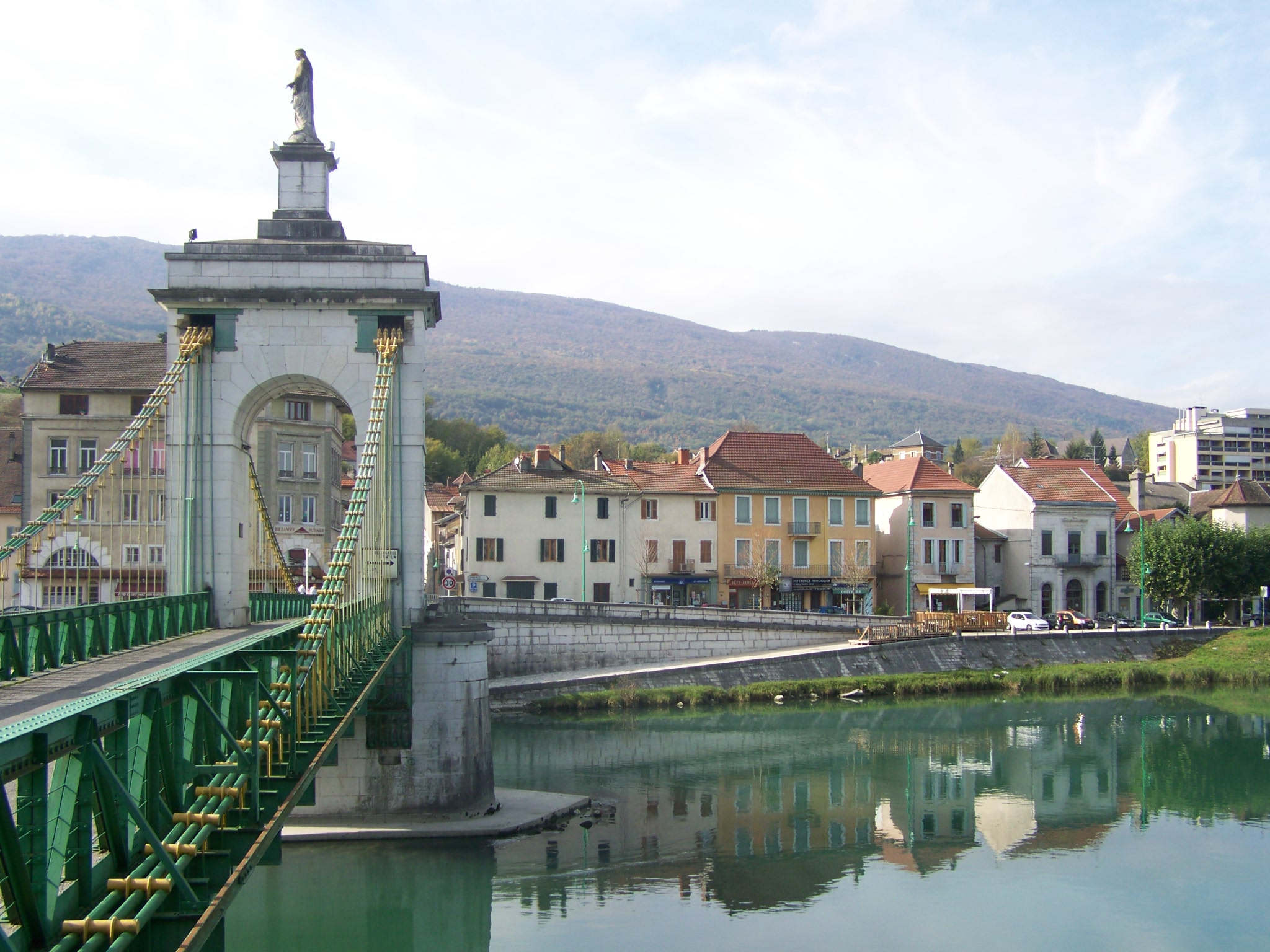
- Town center seen from Seyssel, Haute-Savoie

- Coat of arms
- Location of Seyssel
- Location within France Location within Auvergne-Rhône-Alpes
- Coordinates: 45°57′21″N 5°49′55″E
- Country: France
- Region: Auvergne-Rhône-Alpes
- Department: Ain
- Arrondissement: Belley
- Canton: Plateau d'Hauteville
- Intercommunality: CC Usses et Rhône

Government
  - Mayor (2026–32): Michel Botteri
- Area^{1}: 2.40 km^{2} (0.93 sq mi)
- Elevation: 258 m (846 ft)
- Highest elevation: 332 m (1,089 ft)
- Lowest elevation: 250 m (820 ft)
- Population (2023): 1,008
  - Density: 420/km^{2} (1,090/sq mi)
- Time zone: UTC+01:00 (CET)
  - Summer (DST): UTC+02:00 (CEST)
- INSEE/Postal code: 01407 /01420
- ^{1} French Land Register data, which excludes lakes, ponds, glaciers > 1 km^{2} (0.386 sq mi or 247 acres) and river estuaries.

Seyssel (French pronunciation: [sɛsɛl]; Arpitan: Sèssél) is a commune in the Ain department in eastern France. It lies on the west (right) bank of the Rhône.

The part of the town across the Rhône is also named Seyssel but located in the Haute-Savoie department, and is locally referred as Seyssel-Savoie. It is a rare case in France of two homonymous communes adjacent to each other, similar to the situation of the village of Saint-Pierre-d'Entremont, divided between the communes of Saint-Pierre-d'Entremont (Isère) and Saint-Pierre-d'Entremont (Savoie).

== Population ==
Historical population
Year	Pop.	±% p.a.
1968	1,029	—
1975	1,043	+0.19%
1982	831	−3.19%
1990	817	−0.21%
1999	801	−0.22%
2007	917	+1.70%
2012	950	+0.71%
2017	999	+1.01%
2023	1,008	+0.15%
Source: INSEE

== See also ==
- Communes of the Ain department
- Pont de la Vierge noire
- Pont de Seyssel
