= Noailhac, Aveyron =

Part of Conques-en-Rouergue in Occitanie, France

Noailhac
- Part of Conques-en-Rouergue
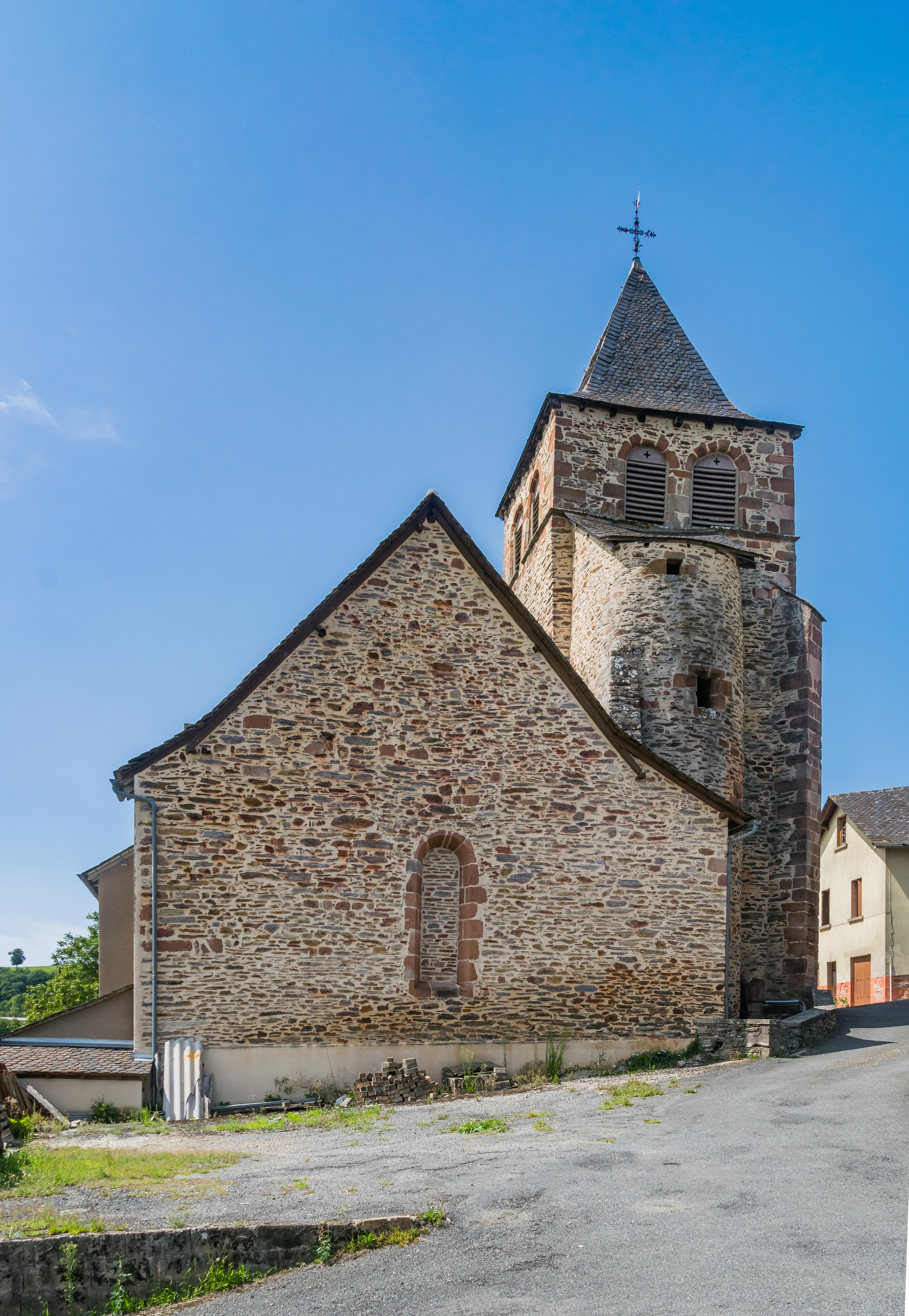
- Saint Jean Baptiste Church
- Location of Noailhac
- Location within France Location within Occitanie
- Coordinates: 44°34′01″N 2°22′34″E
- Country: France
- Region: Occitania
- Department: Aveyron
- Arrondissement: Rodez
- Canton: Lot et Dourdou
- Commune: Conques-en-Rouergue
- Area^{1}: 15.96 km^{2} (6.16 sq mi)
- Elevation: 588 m (1,929 ft)
- Highest elevation: 625 m (2,051 ft)
- Lowest elevation: 280 m (920 ft)
- Population (2023): 145
  - Density: 9.09/km^{2} (23.5/sq mi)
- Time zone: UTC+01:00 (CET)
  - Summer (DST): UTC+02:00 (CEST)
- Postal code: 12320
- ^{1} French Land Register data, which excludes lakes, ponds, glaciers > 1 km^{2} (0.386 sq mi or 247 acres) and river estuaries.

Noailhac (French pronunciation: [nɔajak], Languedocien: Noalhac) is a former commune in the Aveyron department in southern France. On 1 January 2016, it was merged into the new commune of Conques-en-Rouergue.

== See also ==
- Communes of the Aveyron department
