= Saint-Parthem =

Commune in Occitanie, France

- Commune
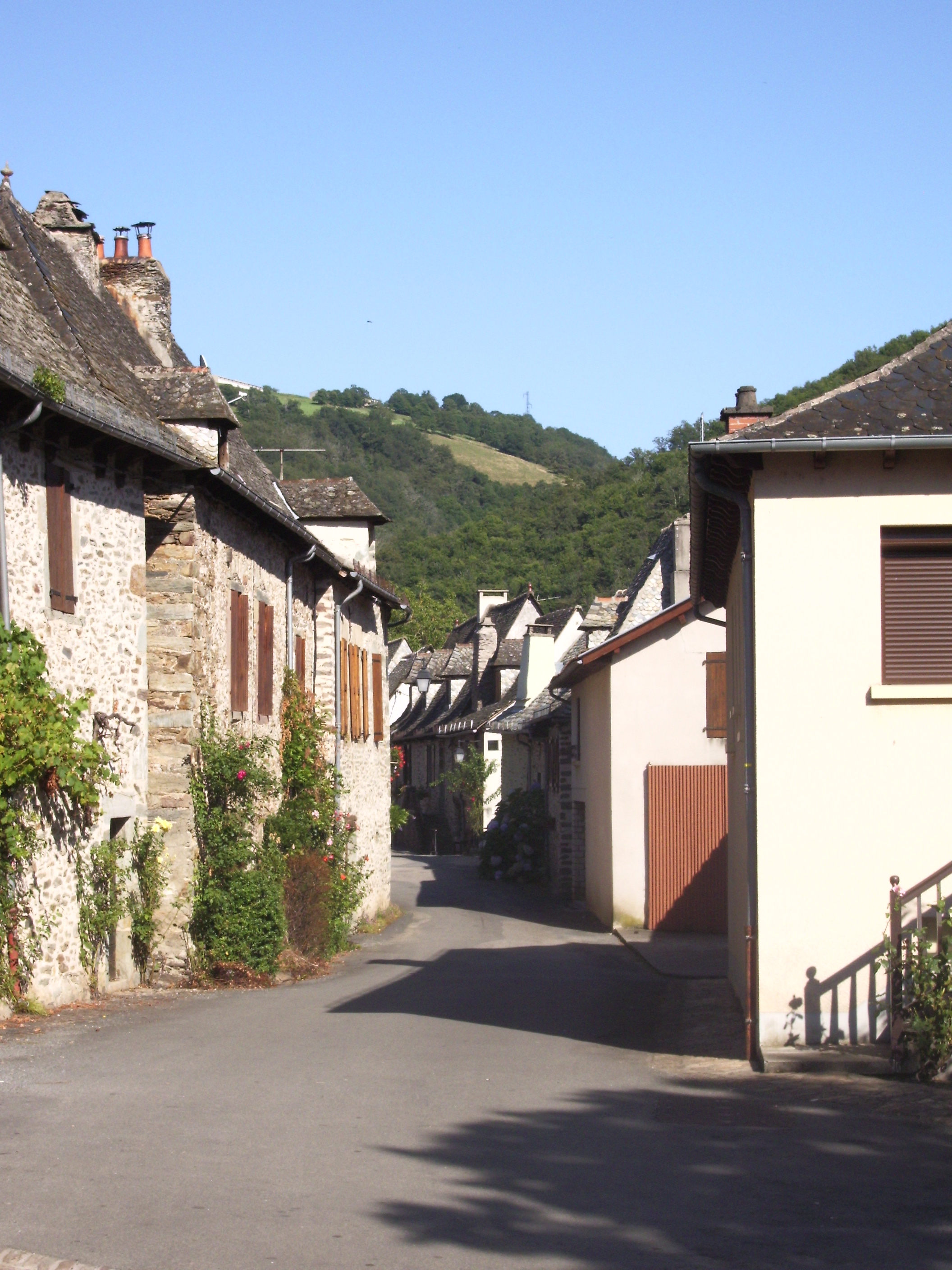
- The main street in Saint-Parthem
- Location of Saint-Parthem
- Location within France Location within Occitanie
- Coordinates: 44°37′37″N 2°18′57″E
- Country: France
- Region: Occitania
- Department: Aveyron
- Arrondissement: Villefranche-de-Rouergue
- Canton: Lot et Dourdou

Government
  - Mayor (2020–2026): Jean-Michael Reynes
- Area^{1}: 20.43 km^{2} (7.89 sq mi)
- Elevation: 204 m (669 ft)
- Highest elevation: 592 m (1,942 ft)
- Lowest elevation: 180 m (590 ft)
- Population (2023): 399
  - Density: 19.5/km^{2} (50.6/sq mi)
- Time zone: UTC+01:00 (CET)
  - Summer (DST): UTC+02:00 (CEST)
- INSEE/Postal code: 12240 /12300
- ^{1} French Land Register data, which excludes lakes, ponds, glaciers > 1 km^{2} (0.386 sq mi or 247 acres) and river estuaries.

Saint-Parthem (French pronunciation: [sɛ̃ paʁtɛm]; Occitan: Sent Partèm) is a commune in the Aveyron department in southern France.

== Population ==
Historical population
Year	Pop.	±% p.a.
1968	569	—
1975	540	−0.74%
1982	515	−0.67%
1990	466	−1.24%
1999	445	−0.51%
2007	430	−0.43%
2012	406	−1.14%
2017	406	+0.00%
2023	399	−0.29%
Source: INSEE

== See also ==
- Communes of the Aveyron department
