= Saint-Santin =

Commune in Occitanie, France

- Commune
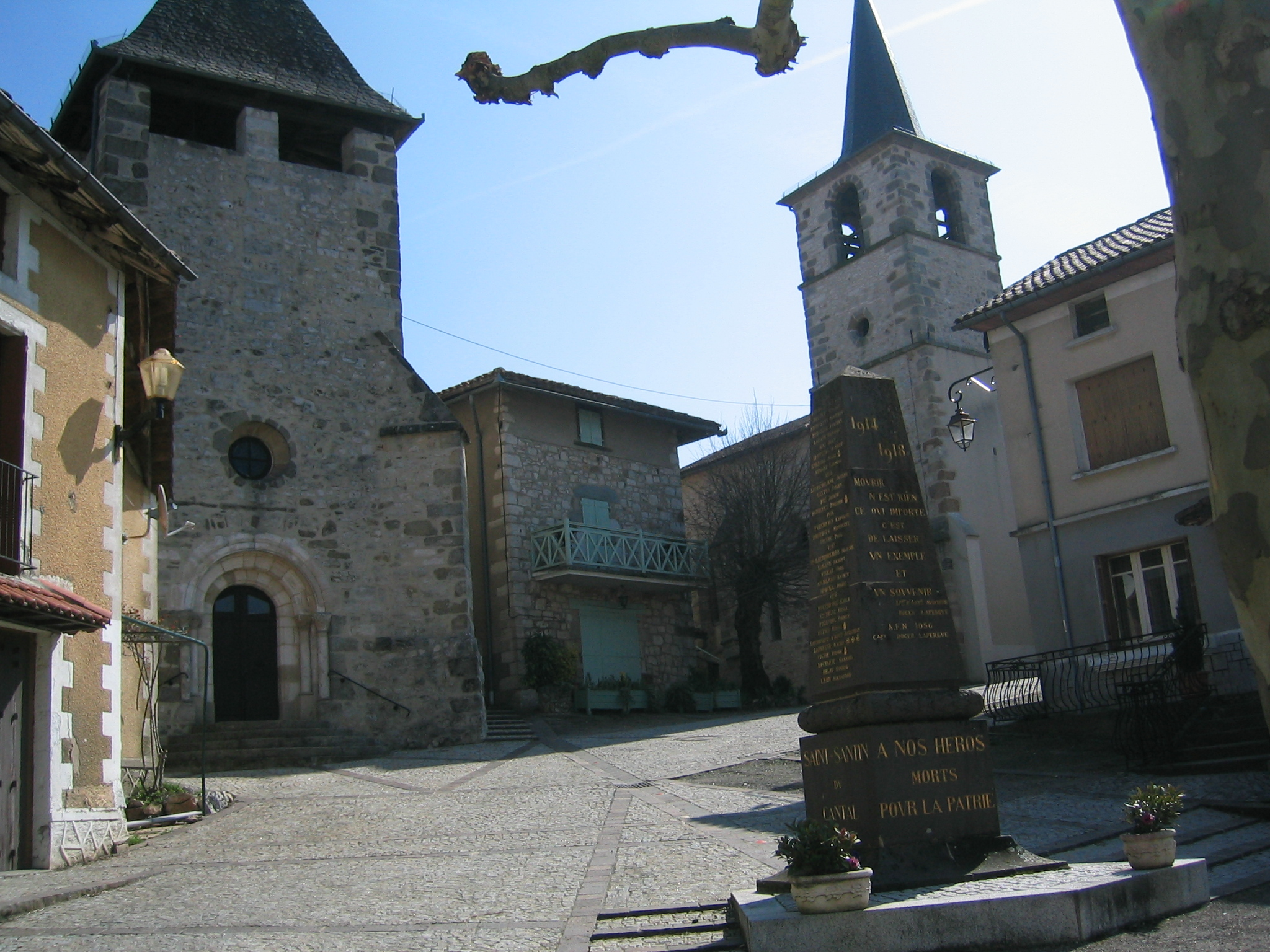
- The main square and the two churches
- Location of Saint-Santin
- Location within France Location within Occitanie
- Coordinates: 44°38′59″N 2°13′09″E
- Country: France
- Region: Occitania
- Department: Aveyron
- Arrondissement: Villefranche-de-Rouergue
- Canton: Lot et Dourdou
- Intercommunality: Decazeville Communauté

Government
  - Mayor (2020–2026): Michèle Couderc
- Area^{1}: 22.78 km^{2} (8.80 sq mi)
- Highest elevation: 592 m (1,942 ft)
- Lowest elevation: 187 m (614 ft)
- Population (2023): 514
  - Density: 22.6/km^{2} (58.4/sq mi)
- Time zone: UTC+01:00 (CET)
  - Summer (DST): UTC+02:00 (CEST)
- INSEE/Postal code: 12246 /12300
- ^{1} French Land Register data, which excludes lakes, ponds, glaciers > 1 km^{2} (0.386 sq mi or 247 acres) and river estuaries.

Saint-Santin (French pronunciation: [sɛ̃ sɑ̃tɛ̃]; Languedocien: Sent Antin), or Saint-Santin d'Aveyron, is a commune in the Aveyron department in southern France.

Since the French revolution, the town of Saint-Santin has been split into two communes in neighbouring departments, Saint-Santin d'Aveyron and Saint-Santin-de-Maurs in the department of Cantal.

== Population ==
Historical population
Year	Pop.	±% p.a.
1968	696	—
1975	664	−0.67%
1982	643	−0.46%
1990	575	−1.39%
1999	534	−0.82%
2007	570	+0.82%
2012	551	−0.68%
2017	555	+0.14%
2023	514	−1.27%
Source: INSEE

== See also ==
- Communes of the Aveyron department
