= Lassouts =

Commune in Occitanie, France

- Commune
- Coat of arms
- Location of Lassouts
- Location within France Location within Occitanie
- Coordinates: 44°29′14″N 2°51′53″E
- Country: France
- Region: Occitania
- Department: Aveyron
- Arrondissement: Rodez
- Canton: Lot et Palanges

Government
  - Mayor (2020–2026): Elodie Gardes
- Area^{1}: 30.74 km^{2} (11.87 sq mi)
- Elevation: 652 m (2,139 ft)
- Highest elevation: 863 m (2,831 ft)
- Lowest elevation: 360 m (1,180 ft)
- Population (2023): 318
  - Density: 10.3/km^{2} (26.8/sq mi)
- Time zone: UTC+01:00 (CET)
  - Summer (DST): UTC+02:00 (CEST)
- INSEE/Postal code: 12124 /12500
- ^{1} French Land Register data, which excludes lakes, ponds, glaciers > 1 km^{2} (0.386 sq mi or 247 acres) and river estuaries.

Lassouts (Occitan: Las Sots) is a commune in the Aveyron department in southern France.

== Population ==
Historical population
Year	Pop.	±% p.a.
1968	513	—
1975	420	−2.82%
1982	382	−1.35%
1990	349	−1.12%
1999	326	−0.75%
2007	314	−0.47%
2012	317	+0.19%
2017	289	−1.83%
2023	318	+1.61%
Source: INSEE

== See also ==
- Communes of the Aveyron department
