= Boisse-Penchot =

Commune in Occitanie, France

- Commune
- Coat of arms
- Location of Boisse-Penchot
- Location within France Location within Occitanie
- Coordinates: 44°35′31″N 2°12′27″E
- Country: France
- Region: Occitania
- Department: Aveyron
- Arrondissement: Villefranche-de-Rouergue
- Canton: Lot et Dourdou

Government
  - Mayor (2020–2026): Francis Cayron
- Area^{1}: 4.64 km^{2} (1.79 sq mi)
- Elevation: 187 m (614 ft)
- Highest elevation: 463 m (1,519 ft)
- Lowest elevation: 172 m (564 ft)
- Population (2023): 514
  - Density: 111/km^{2} (287/sq mi)
- Time zone: UTC+01:00 (CET)
  - Summer (DST): UTC+02:00 (CEST)
- INSEE/Postal code: 12028 /12300
- ^{1} French Land Register data, which excludes lakes, ponds, glaciers > 1 km^{2} (0.386 sq mi or 247 acres) and river estuaries.

Boisse-Penchot is a commune in the Aveyron department in southern France.

== Population ==
Historical population
| Year | Pop. | ±% p.a. |
|---|---|---|
| 1968 | 735 | — |
| 1975 | 622 | −2.36% |
| 1982 | 646 | +0.54% |
| 1990 | 546 | −2.08% |
| 1999 | 509 | −0.78% |
| 2007 | 543 | +0.81% |
| 2012 | 538 | −0.18% |
| 2017 | 515 | −0.87% |
| 2023 | 514 | −0.03% |
Source: INSEE

== See also ==
- Communes of the Aveyron department
