= Decazeville =

Commune in Occitanie, France

- Commune
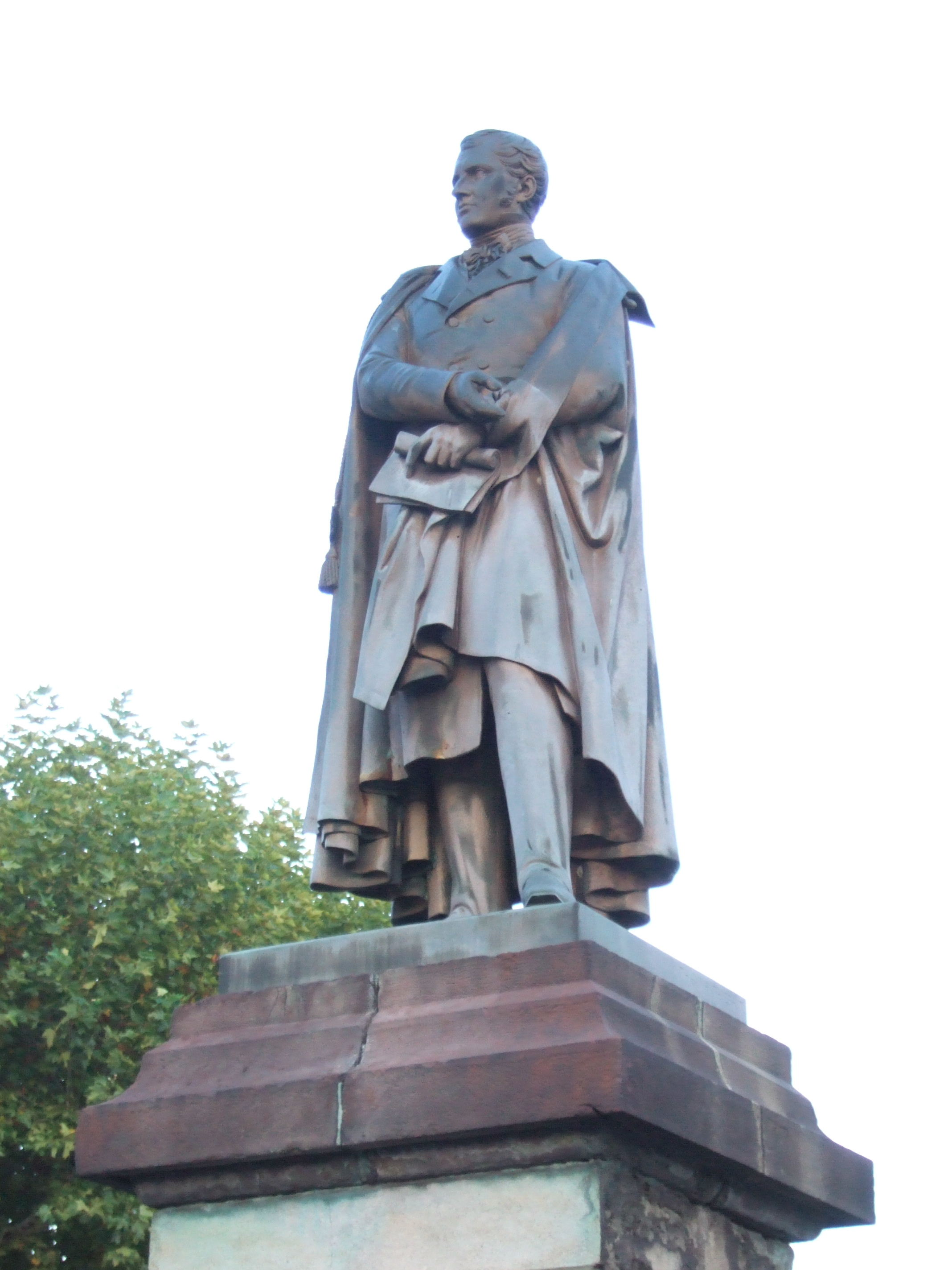
- Statue of Élie Decazes

- Coat of arms
- Location of Decazeville
- Location within France Location within Occitanie
- Coordinates: 44°33′35″N 2°15′23″E
- Country: France
- Region: Occitania
- Department: Aveyron
- Arrondissement: Villefranche-de-Rouergue
- Canton: Lot et Dourdou

Government
  - Mayor (2020–2026): François Marty
- Area^{1}: 13.88 km^{2} (5.36 sq mi)
- Elevation: 225 m (738 ft)
- Highest elevation: 454 m (1,490 ft)
- Lowest elevation: 163 m (535 ft)
- Population (2023): 5,020
  - Density: 362/km^{2} (937/sq mi)
- Time zone: UTC+01:00 (CET)
  - Summer (DST): UTC+02:00 (CEST)
- INSEE/Postal code: 12089 /12300
- ^{1} French Land Register data, which excludes lakes, ponds, glaciers > 1 km^{2} (0.386 sq mi or 247 acres) and river estuaries.

Decazeville (Occitan: La Sala) is a commune in the Aveyron department in the Occitanie region in southern France.

The commune was created in the 19th century because of the Industrial Revolution and was named after the Duke of Decazes (1780–1860), the founder of the factory that created the town. Viviez-Decazeville station has rail connections to Brive-la-Gaillarde, Figeac and Rodez.

== History ==
The town is built on coal. La Salle (the former name) produced coal since the 16th century. It was exported in small quantities to Bordeaux.

Louis XIV and his successors gave mines to their mistresses. The Duke of Decazes inherited such mines. In 1826 he created, with the help of a technician named Cabrol, the "Houillères et Fonderies de l'Aveyron" (Mines and Foundries of Aveyron) which developed to make this small village a center of ironworking and industry.

Under Napoléon III, the city took the name of Decazeville. A statue of Decazes dressed in a Roman toga was erected.

In 1894, the anarchists in the area were targeted during the repression of January and February 1894.

The high point of iron production was reached early in the 20th century, when some 9000 employees produced 1 million tons of steel. Production decreased after changes in the industry that shifted many jobs offshore. A noted strike of mine workers occurred from 1961 to 1962. Some 1500 miners spent 66 days in the mines from 23 December 1961 to 26 February 1962. The last mines closed in June 2001.

Although Decazeville felt the full brunt of the decline in the mining industry, the town has diversified its economy. It now has metallurgy, woodworking, metal fabrication, and production of steel tubing.

The town has a geological museum named after Pierre Vetter, its founder. It is dedicated to coal strata. The open-pit mine La Découverte is open to the public.

The modern church of Notre-Dame has a celebrated painting of the Way of the Cross by Gustave Moreau.

== Population ==
Historical population

Year	Pop.	±% p.a.
1836	2,715	—
1841	4,154	+8.88%
1846	6,323	+8.77%
1851	5,938	−1.25%
1856	8,842	+8.29%
1861	8,620	−0.51%
1866	7,106	−3.79%
1872	8,710	+3.45%
1876	9,547	+2.32%
1881	9,625	+0.16%
1886	10,702	+2.14%
1891	8,871	−3.68%
1896	9,634	+1.66%
1901	11,536	+3.67%
1906	12,961	+2.36%
1911	14,144	+1.76%

Year	Pop.	±% p.a.
1921	14,089	−0.04%
1926	14,261	+0.24%
1931	15,210	+1.30%
1936	12,365	−4.06%
1946	12,138	−0.19%
1954	11,510	−0.66%
1962	11,855	+0.37%
1968	10,532	−1.95%
1975	10,231	−0.41%
1982	8,804	−2.12%
1990	7,754	−1.57%
1999	6,805	−1.44%
2007	6,203	−1.15%
2012	5,935	−0.88%
2017	5,360	−2.02%
2023	5,020	−1.09%

Source: EHESS and INSEE (1968-2023)

== Twin towns ==
Decazeville is twinned with:

- Utrillas, Spain
- Coazze, Italy

== Personalities ==
- Élie Decazes (1780–1860), founder of the town and president of ministers under Louis XVIII.
- Maurice Frot (1928–2004), writer
- Jacques Monfrin (1924–1998), philologist born in Decazeville
- Paul Ramadier, mayor of Decazeville from 1919 to 1959, governor of Aveyron, and minister
- Jean-Pierre Timbaud (1904–1941), World War II Resistance fighter worked briefly in the mines as a child

== See also ==
- List of places named after people
- Héroïnes, a 1997 film partly set in Decazeville
- Virtual 3D tour in GE
- Communes of the Aveyron department
