= Canton of Lot et Dourdou =

Coordinates: 44.56°N 2.25°E

- Canton
- Situation of the canton of Lot et Dourdou in the department of Aveyron
- Country: France
- Region: Occitania
- Department: Aveyron
- No. of communes: {{{nbcomm}}}
- Population (2023): 12,619
- INSEE code: 1207

The canton of Lot et Dourdou is an administrative division of the Aveyron department, southern France. It was created at the French canton reorganisation which came into effect in March 2015. Its seat is in Decazeville.

It consists of the following communes:

1. Almont-les-Junies
2. Boisse-Penchot
3. Conques-en-Rouergue
4. Decazeville
5. Flagnac
6. Livinhac-le-Haut
7. Saint-Félix-de-Lunel
8. Saint-Parthem
9. Saint-Santin
10. Sénergues
11. Viviez
