= Canton of Montaigu-de-Quercy =

Coordinates: 44°20′06″N 0°57′41″E

Montaigu-de-Quercy
- Former canton
- Interactive map of Montaigu-de-Quercy
- Country: France
- Region: Occitania
- Department: Tarn-et-Garonne
- No. of communes: {{{nbcomm}}}
- Disbanded: 2015
- Population (2012): 2,570

The canton of Montaigu-de-Quercy is a French former administrative division in the department of Tarn-et-Garonne and region Midi-Pyrénées. It had 2,570 inhabitants (2012). It was disbanded following the French canton reorganisation which came into effect in March 2015. It consisted of 6 communes, which joined the canton of Pays de Serres Sud-Quercy in 2015.

== Communes ==
The communes in the canton of Montaigu-de-Quercy:

- Montaigu-de-Quercy
- Belvèze
- Roquecor
- Saint-Amans-du-Pech
- Saint-Beauzeil
- Valeilles
