= Montjoi, Tarn-et-Garonne =

Montjoi
- Commune
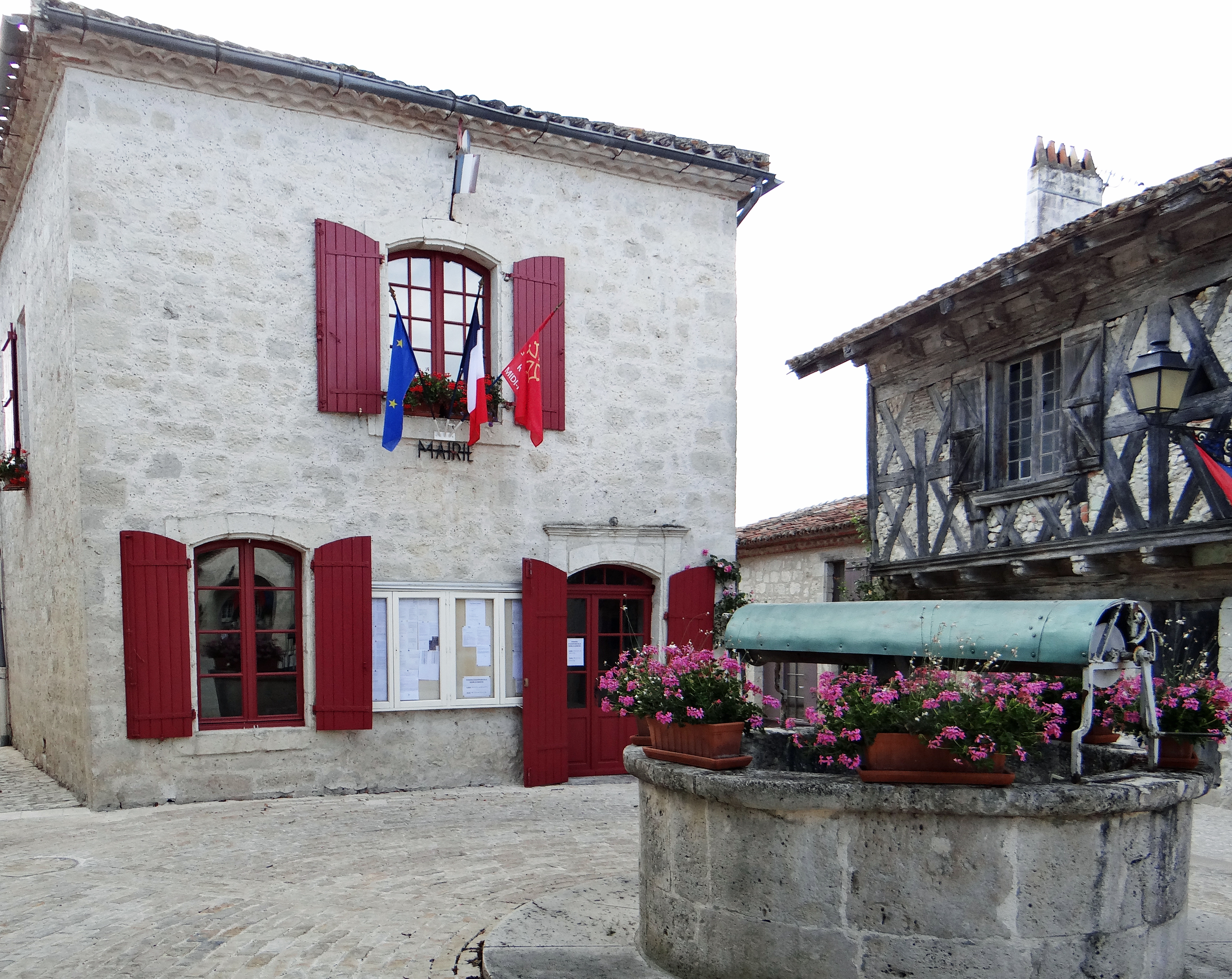
- The town hall of Montjoi

- Coat of arms
- Location of Montjoi
- Location within France Location within Occitanie
- Coordinates: 44°11′51″N 0°55′15″E
- Country: France
- Region: Occitania
- Department: Tarn-et-Garonne
- Arrondissement: Castelsarrasin
- Canton: Valence
- Intercommunality: Deux Rives

Government
  - Mayor (2026–32): Jean-Michel Pignon
- Area^{1}: 14.67 km^{2} (5.66 sq mi)
- Elevation: 165 m (541 ft)
- Highest elevation: 217 m (712 ft)
- Lowest elevation: 80 m (260 ft)
- Population (2023): 172
  - Density: 11.7/km^{2} (30.4/sq mi)
- Time zone: UTC+01:00 (CET)
  - Summer (DST): UTC+02:00 (CEST)
- INSEE/Postal code: 82130 /82400
- ^{1} French Land Register data, which excludes lakes, ponds, glaciers > 1 km^{2} (0.386 sq mi or 247 acres) and river estuaries.

Montjoi (French pronunciation: [mɔ̃ʒwa]; Occitan: Montjòi) is a commune in the Tarn-et-Garonne department in the Occitanie region in southern France

The inhabitants are called Montjoviens .

== Geography ==
Situated between the valleys of the Lot and Garonne rivers, Montjoi is an old Bastide village founded in 1256–1257 with half-timbered houses made of Quercy limestone and red brick from the local area, located on a rocky outcrop offering views over the surrounding countryside.

== See also ==
- Communes of the Tarn-et-Garonne department

=== Location ===
The town is located 16 km north-north-east of Valence-d'Agen, in the Quercy blanc region overlooking the Séoune River. It is near the border with the department of Lot et Garonne.

=== Hydrography ===
Monjoi overlooks the valley of the Séoune.

=== Bordering municipalities ===
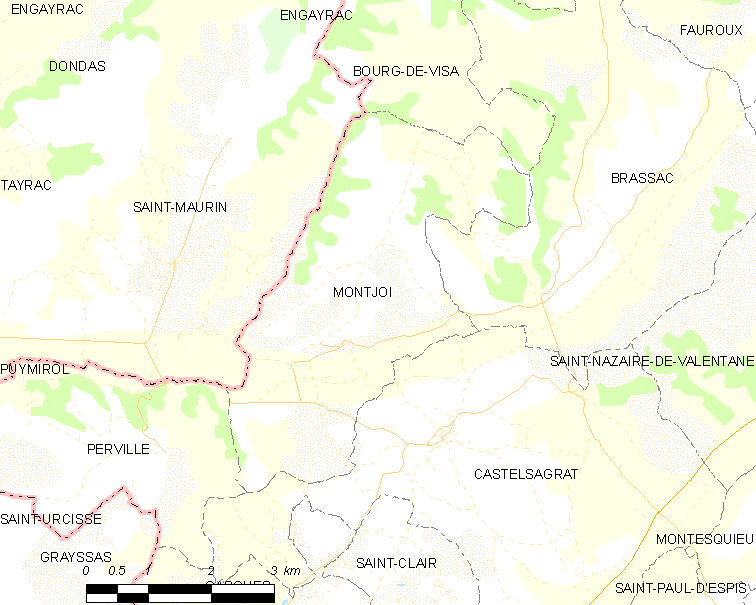
Map of the commune of Montjoi and close communes.

== Toponymy ==
The oldest form is "castri Montis Gaudii in 1255" then Montegaudii in 1272 to become Montis Jovis in 1326, then Montjoye in 1470. Some have seen a compound of the Latin montem (height) and the genitive of gaudium (joy). But in Occitan Montjoi designates a place said to be located on frequented paths.

== History ==
Perched on its rocky peak, a former castrum (Latin for Castle), Montjoi was founded in the 13th century by the Lord of Penne and Alphonse de Poitiers, count of Toulouse, who made it a royal bastide around 1255–1256. In 1287 it was ceded to Edward I of England. In 1337 the Hundred Years' War begins. It ends in 1475 (i.e. 138 years). It passed into the Beauville family in 1348. In 1622 Cardinal Richelieu ordered the destruction of the walls of all bastides.

== Politics and administration ==
The Mayor is Jean-Michel Pignon, elected to a 6-year term in 2026.

== Demographics ==
The town had more than 700 inhabitants in the middle of the 18th century but has continued to decline to the present 166 in the commune.

== Economy ==
The area economy is mainly agricultural with mixed farming including cereals, livestock, onions, strawberries, fruits, nuts, etc.

== Local culture and heritage ==
=== Places and monuments ===
- A walkway around the village dominates the surrounding countryside and the Séoune valley, passing through the 14th century ogival entrance door leading to the half-timbered and corbelled houses of the 14th and 15th centuries.
- The first church in Montjoi was built during the creation of the bastide and dedicated to Notre Dame (Our lady), but was ruined during the Wars of Religion, it disappeared so well that we do not know its exact location. It belonged to the diocese of Cahors but depended on the abbey of Saint-Maurin which had made it one of its priories. The present Saint Martin's Church outside the village walls was rebuilt in the 2nd half of the 15th century. The bell tower and vaulting of the nave was rebuilt between 1857 and 1870, stained glass by Victor Gesta of Toulouse, dated by historical works. The main church is that of Saint Martin de Posicastels; It consists of a choir with 5 sides and a nave of three bays joined by six side chapels. The vault is made of prismatic ribs. The old steeple wall has been replaced by a square tower, built on the north side of the apse which is damped by a spire covered with slates.
- Lavoir (the wash house) is still there, fed from a natural spring, where the women of the village would bring their clothes to wash. Situated behind the "Salle de Fêtes" just outside the entrance to the village. From the parking area go around the Salle de Fêtes to the right and down the hill along a path to the old lavoir.

=== Personalities linked to the municipality ===
- Pierre Perret came to summer camp in Montjoi in his youth.
- Jean-Michel Baylet, minister elected municipal councilor for Montjoi from 1995 to 2014.
- Christian Eurgal, artist, elected mayor of the town in 2014.
- Guilaume DESSAUX Retired cavalry officer of the imperial order who made 15 campaigns, the last for Napoleon 1st at Waterloo (1714–1843) was born in MONTJOI, a plaque in his memory appears on the house.
