= Château de Lastours (Lot) =

Ruined castle in Occitania, France

Coordinates: 44.3541°N 1.1368°E

The Château de Lastours is a ruined castle in the commune of Sainte-Croix in the Lot département of France.

The castle dates from the 13th century, with additions and alterations form the 14th and 17th centuries. It consists of a rectangular corps de logis with large double windows, flanked by two large square towers. The western tower houses a vaulted room which could have been a chapel. To the south of the corps de logis, a vast courtyard is enclosed in the south and west by the remains of an enceinte. In the south west corner, there is a square tower; in the south east corner, a round tower.

The castle is privately owned. It has been listed since 1993 as a monument historique by the French Ministry of Culture.

== See also ==
- List of castles in France
