= Sauzet, Lot =

Sauzet
- Commune
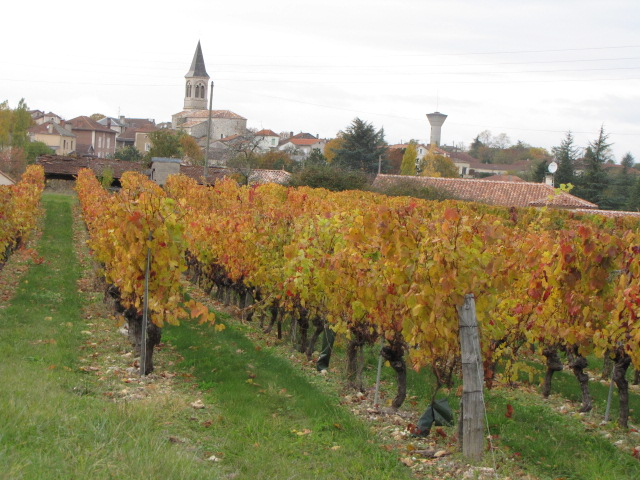
- A view from the Cahors vineyard
- Location of Sauzet
- Location within France Location within Occitanie
- Coordinates: 44°25′08″N 1°15′21″E
- Country: France
- Region: Occitania
- Department: Lot
- Arrondissement: Cahors
- Canton: Luzech
- Intercommunality: Vallée du Lot et Vignoble

Government
  - Mayor (2025–2026): Stéphane Lasjaunias
- Area^{1}: 11.09 km^{2} (4.28 sq mi)
- Elevation: 282 m (925 ft)
- Highest elevation: 312 m (1,024 ft)
- Lowest elevation: 176 m (577 ft)
- Population (2023): 531
  - Density: 47.9/km^{2} (124/sq mi)
- Time zone: UTC+01:00 (CET)
  - Summer (DST): UTC+02:00 (CEST)
- INSEE/Postal code: 46301 /46140
- ^{1} French Land Register data, which excludes lakes, ponds, glaciers > 1 km^{2} (0.386 sq mi or 247 acres) and river estuaries.

Sauzet (French pronunciation: [sozɛ]; Occitan: Sauset) is a commune in the Lot department in south-western France.

== Geography ==
The Séoune has its source in the commune and forms part of its south-western border.

== See also ==
- Communes of the Lot department
