= Lebreil =

- Part of Montcuq-en-Quercy-Blanc
- Location of Lebreil
- Location within France Location within Occitanie
- Coordinates: 44°19′26″N 1°10′08″E
- Country: France
- Region: Occitania
- Department: Lot
- Arrondissement: Cahors
- Canton: Luzech
- Commune: Montcuq-en-Quercy-Blanc
- Area^{1}: 10.2 km^{2} (3.9 sq mi)
- Elevation: 245 m (804 ft)
- Highest elevation: 278 m (912 ft)
- Lowest elevation: 127 m (417 ft)
- Population (2018): 160
  - Density: 16/km^{2} (41/sq mi)
- Time zone: UTC+01:00 (CET)
  - Summer (DST): UTC+02:00 (CEST)
- Postal code: 46800
- ^{1} French Land Register data, which excludes lakes, ponds, glaciers > 1 km^{2} (0.386 sq mi or 247 acres) and river estuaries.

Lebreil (French pronunciation: [ləbʁɛj]; Languedocien: Lebrèlh) is a former commune in the Lot department in south-western France. On 1 January 2016, it was merged into the new commune of Montcuq-en-Quercy-Blanc. Its population was 160 in 2018.

== Geography ==
The Barguelonnette flows south-southwestward through the eastern part of the commune.

== See also ==
- Communes of the Lot department
