= Lafrançaise =

- Commune
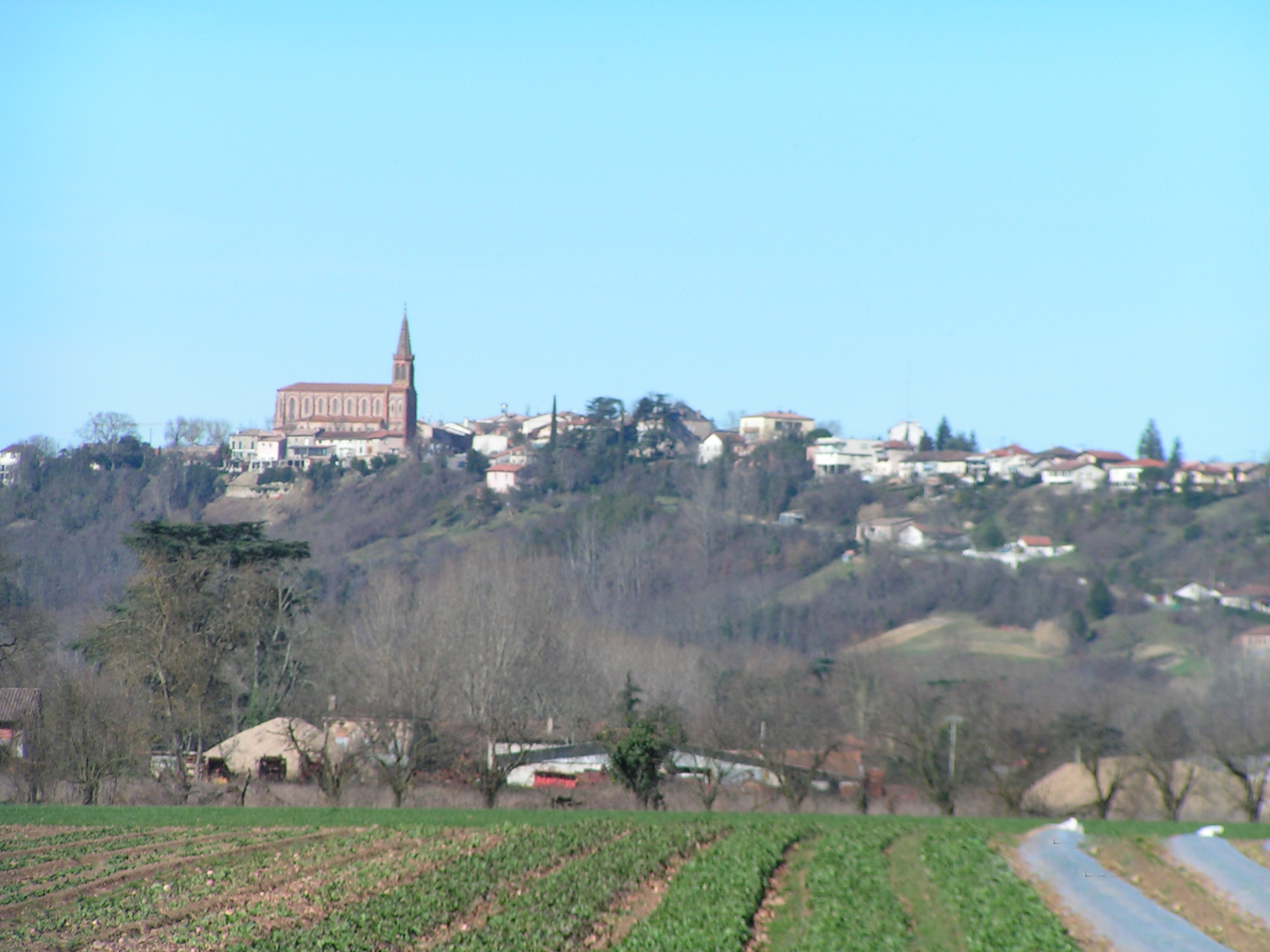
- A general view of Lafrançaise

- Coat of arms
- Location of Lafrançaise
- Location within France Location within Occitanie
- Coordinates: 44°07′43″N 1°14′29″E
- Country: France
- Region: Occitania
- Department: Tarn-et-Garonne
- Arrondissement: Montauban
- Canton: Pays de Serres Sud-Quercy
- Intercommunality: CC du Pays de Lafrançaise

Government
  - Mayor (2020–2026): Thierry Delbreil
- Area^{1}: 50.82 km^{2} (19.62 sq mi)
- Elevation: 190 m (620 ft)
- Highest elevation: 213 m (699 ft)
- Lowest elevation: 65 m (213 ft)
- Population (2023): 2,865
  - Density: 56.38/km^{2} (146.0/sq mi)
- Time zone: UTC+01:00 (CET)
  - Summer (DST): UTC+02:00 (CEST)
- INSEE/Postal code: 82087 /82130
- ^{1} French Land Register data, which excludes lakes, ponds, glaciers > 1 km^{2} (0.386 sq mi or 247 acres) and river estuaries.

Lafrançaise (French pronunciation: [lafʁɑ̃sɛz]; Languedocien: La Francesa) is a commune in the Tarn-et-Garonne department in the Occitanie region in southern France.

== Population ==
Historical population
Year	Pop.	±% p.a.
1968	2,481	—
1975	2,545	+0.36%
1982	2,604	+0.33%
1990	2,651	+0.22%
1999	2,692	+0.17%
2007	2,805	+0.52%
2012	2,870	+0.46%
2017	2,850	−0.14%
2023	2,865	+0.09%
Source: INSEE

== See also ==
- Communes of the Tarn-et-Garonne department
- André Abbal
