= Puycornet =

- Commune
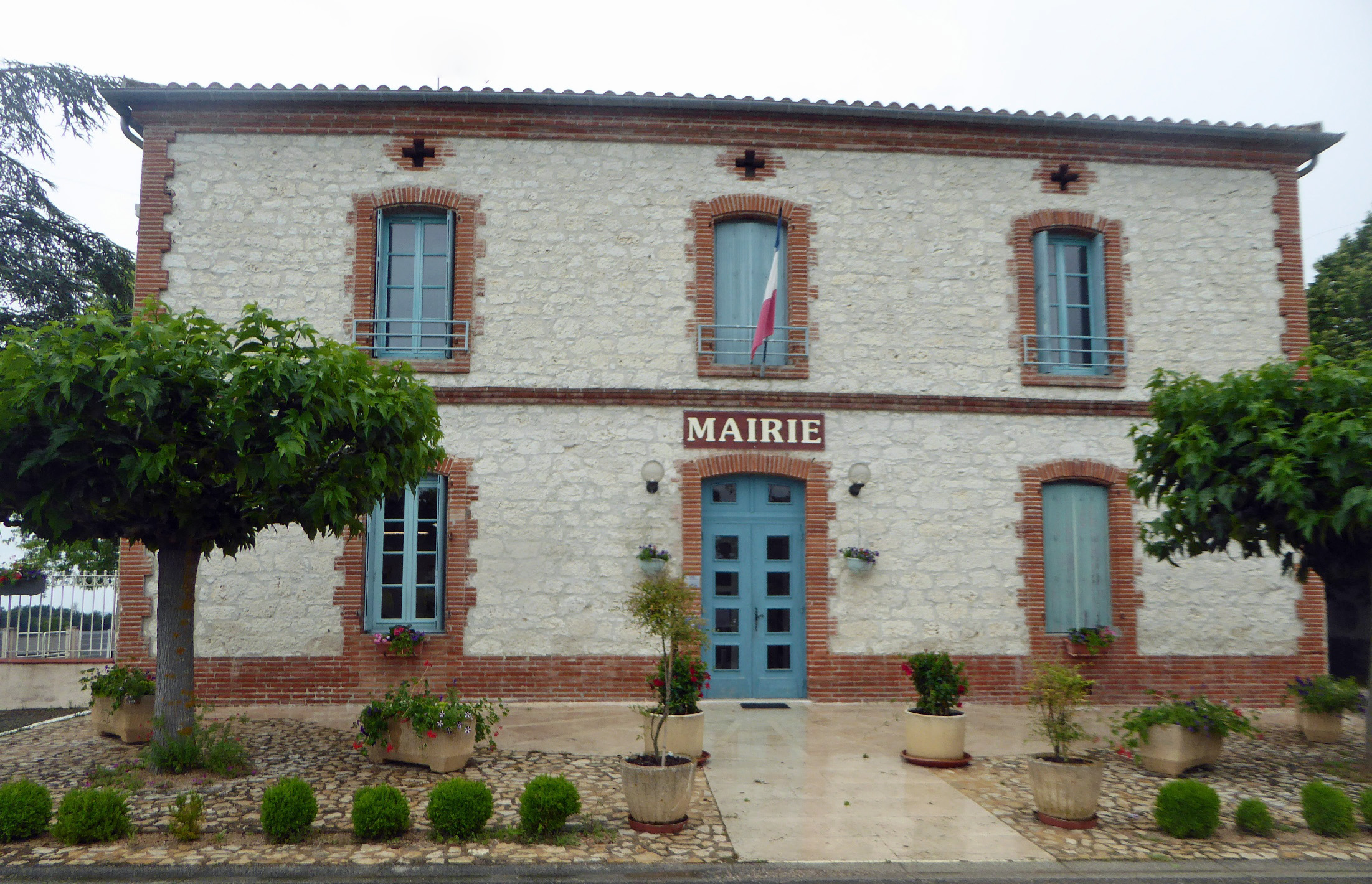
- Town hall
- Location of Puycornet
- Location within France Location within Occitanie
- Coordinates: 44°09′19″N 1°19′09″E
- Country: France
- Region: Occitania
- Department: Tarn-et-Garonne
- Arrondissement: Montauban
- Canton: Pays de Serres Sud-Quercy
- Intercommunality: CC du Pays de Lafrançaise

Government
  - Mayor (2020–2026): Jean-Michel Prayssac
- Area^{1}: 27.46 km^{2} (10.60 sq mi)
- Elevation: 169 m (554 ft)
- Highest elevation: 198 m (650 ft)
- Lowest elevation: 94 m (308 ft)
- Population (2023): 785
  - Density: 28.6/km^{2} (74.0/sq mi)
- Time zone: UTC+01:00 (CET)
  - Summer (DST): UTC+02:00 (CEST)
- INSEE/Postal code: 82144 /82220
- ^{1} French Land Register data, which excludes lakes, ponds, glaciers > 1 km^{2} (0.386 sq mi or 247 acres) and river estuaries.

Puycornet (French pronunciation: [pɥikɔʁnɛ]; Occitan: Puègcornet) is a commune in the Tarn-et-Garonne department in the Occitanie region in southern France.

== Points of Interest ==
- Saint-Étienne church in Cougournac
- Notre-Dame-de-l’Assomption church in Gibiniargues
- Saint-Romain church in Saint-Romain
- Kirche Saint-Saturnin church in Camareil
- Caste of Lisle from the 13th century
- Remains of an ancient Roman bridge at Sainte-Arthémie

== See also ==
- Communes of the Tarn-et-Garonne department
