= Séoune =

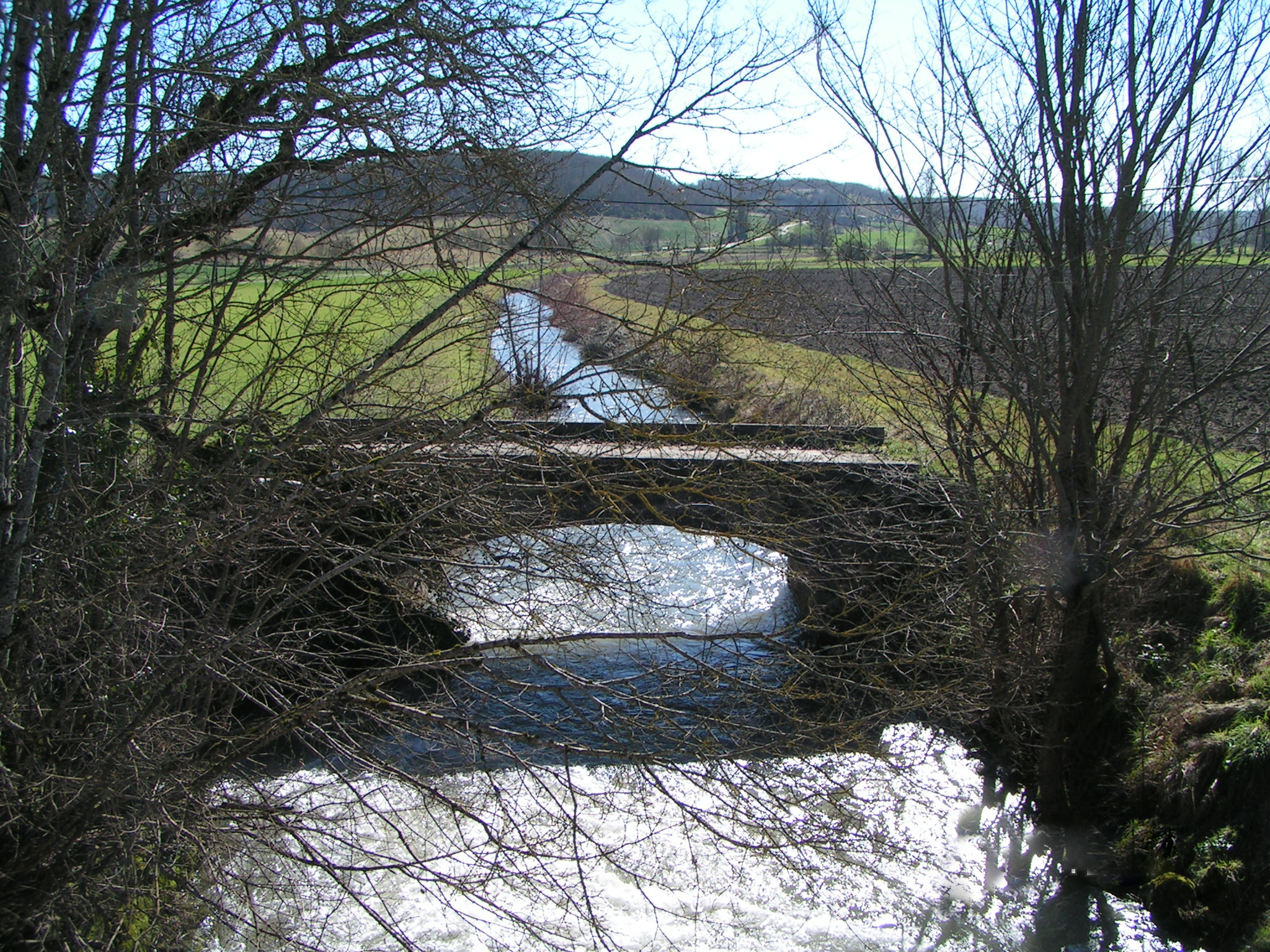

- Location within France Location within Nouvelle-Aquitaine

Location
- Country: France

Physical characteristics
- Source
  - location: Sauzet
  - coordinates: 44°24′07″N 01°15′44″E
  - elevation: 270 m (890 ft)
- Mouth
  - location: Garonne
  - coordinates: 44°09′43″N 0°40′21″E
  - elevation: 45 m (148 ft)
- Length: 65 km (40 mi)
- Basin size: 463 km^{2} (179 sq mi)
- Discharge
  - average: 3.07 m^{3}/s (108 cu ft/s)

Basin features
- Progression: Garonne→ Gironde estuary→ Atlantic Ocean

The Séoune (French pronunciation: [seun]; French: la Séoune) is a 65-kilometre (40 mi) long river in the Lot, Tarn-et-Garonne and Lot-et-Garonne départements, southwestern France. Its source is at Sauzet. It flows generally southwest. It is a right tributary of the Garonne into which it flows between Lafox and Boé, near Agen.

== Départements and communes along its course ==
This list is ordered from source to mouth:

- Lot: Sauzet, Carnac-Rouffiac, Bagat-en-Quercy, Fargues, Montcuq, Belmontet, Valprionde,
- Tarn-et-Garonne: Belvèze, Bouloc, Lauzerte, Montagudet, Touffailles, Miramont-de-Quercy, Fauroux, Brassac, Castelsagrat, Montjoi
- Lot-et-Garonne: Saint-Maurin
- Tarn-et-Garonne: Perville
- Lot-et-Garonne: Tayrac, Puymirol, Saint-Pierre-de-Clairac, Castelculier, Lafox, Boé
