= André Abbal =

French sculptor

André Abbal (1876–1953) was a French sculptor. He was commissioned to work on several war memorials. He is best known as a pioneer of "Direct carving" and became known as "L'Apôtre de la Taille Directe" (the apostle of direct carving).

== Biography ==
Born in Montech in the Tarn-et-Garonne department, the son and grandson of stonemasons, Abbal's parents were Léon Armand Abbal, who practiced as a sculptor, and Jeanne Cousteau. His paternal grandfather was Jacques Abbal, who worked with Violet-le-Duc restoring religious monuments. Abbal studied at the École des Beaux-Arts in Toulouse, then the École des Beaux-Arts in Paris where he was taught by Alexandre Falguière and Antonin Mercié. He was a frequent exhibitor at the Salon des Artistes Français, won the Chenavard prize twice, and was awarded two gold medals.

Abbal was an advocate of "Direct carving". In 1913 he first submitted a work which had been carved directly into stone, without the convention of starting with a model. This piece was called "Le Génie luttant" and it caused something of a controversy with his fellow sculptors, some being for the technique and others against it.

He tended to avoid the Parisien scene and after his marriage in 1921 he moved to Carbonne. Outside of the Paris Salon he exhibited little of his work. It was in 1937 that he exhibited three compositions at the International Fair in Paris- "La Moissoneuse" was shown at the Palais de Tokyo, the future Musée d'art Moderne, "Le Labour" was entered for the "Pavillon Languedoc-Roussillon", and "La Sculpture", a bas-relief was put at the front of the Palais de Chaillot. In the same year his work was shown at two of the year's most important exhibitions, and his work was shown alongside artists such as Bonnard, Duffy, Modigliani, Picasso and Rodin. After reaching the age of 61 he worked only in Carbonne but continued to receive commissions including "Le Centaure" and "La Femme sur Le boeuf". There is a museum in Carbonne dedicated to Abbal. It contains many sculptures and Abbal drawings, They have an excellent website.

== Main works ==
Abbal's work included the following:-

=== "La Vendangeuse" ===
This work is in white limestone and in his composition Abbal depicts a young woman carries an infant on her shoulder and holding a basket of the fruit of the Vendange. The work is located in Carbonne.

=== "Cariatide" ===
This is another composition in white limestone and located in Carbonne in the garden of the Musée Abbal.

=== "Milan sur un Rocher" ===
This terra cotta work executed in 1935 is held in the collection of the Mont-de-Marsan museum.

=== "Tête d'Enfant" ===
This terra cotta piece is also held in the Mont-de-Marsan museum.

=== Decoration to a building ===
In 1928 Abbal executed a sculptural decoration to the building at 51-55 rue Raynouard; 38 rue Berton in Paris. It was in this building that Auguste Perret lived.

=== "Moissonneuse" ===
This limestone sculpture depictis a woman carrying a bale of wheat. The work is dated 1937 and stands in the garden of the Abbal museum in Carbonne. This was the work exhibited at the 1937 "Exposition internationale des arts et techniques" in Paris.

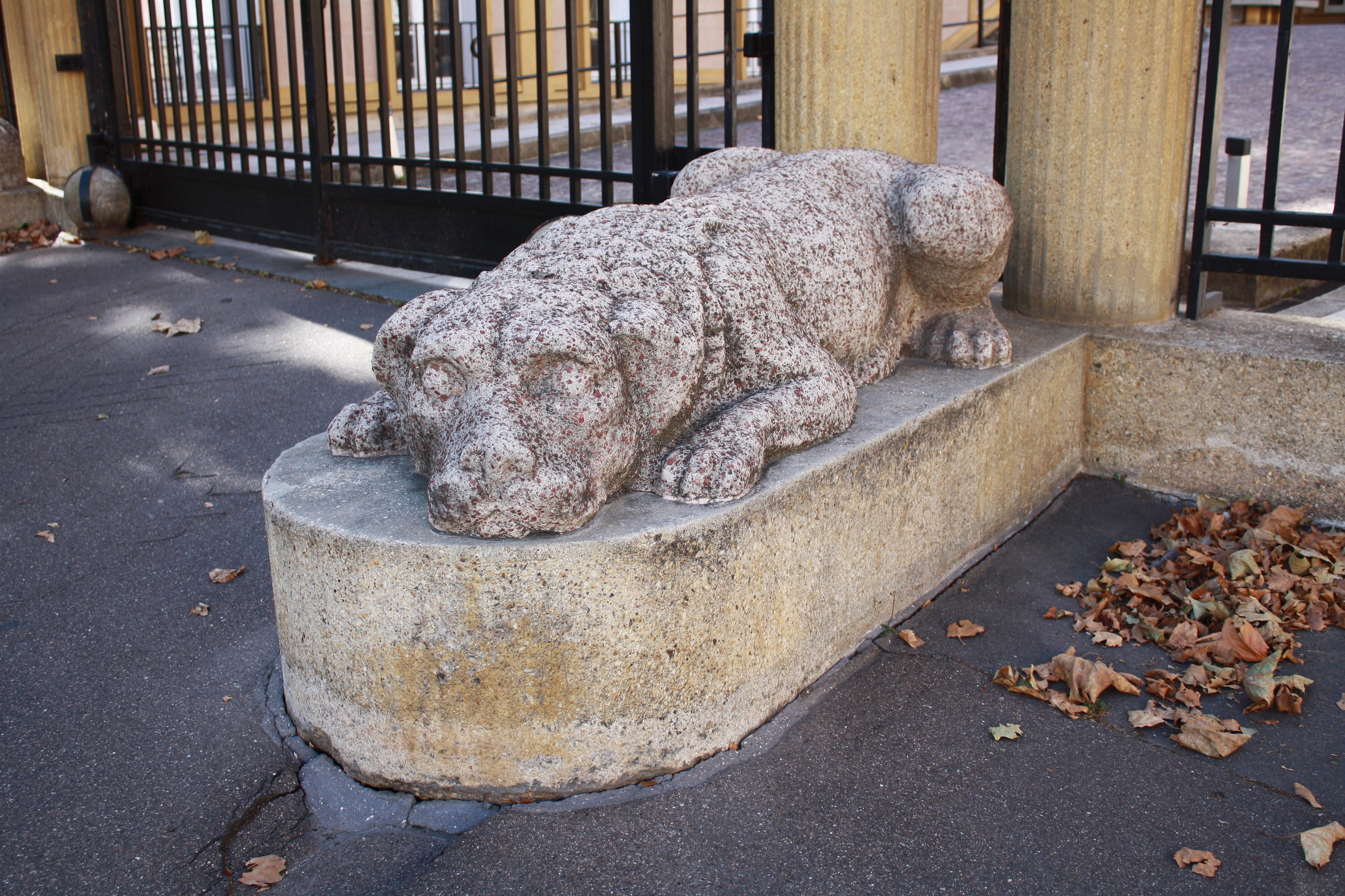
Sculpture of a dog (Mobilier national, Rue Berbier-du-Mets (Paris)

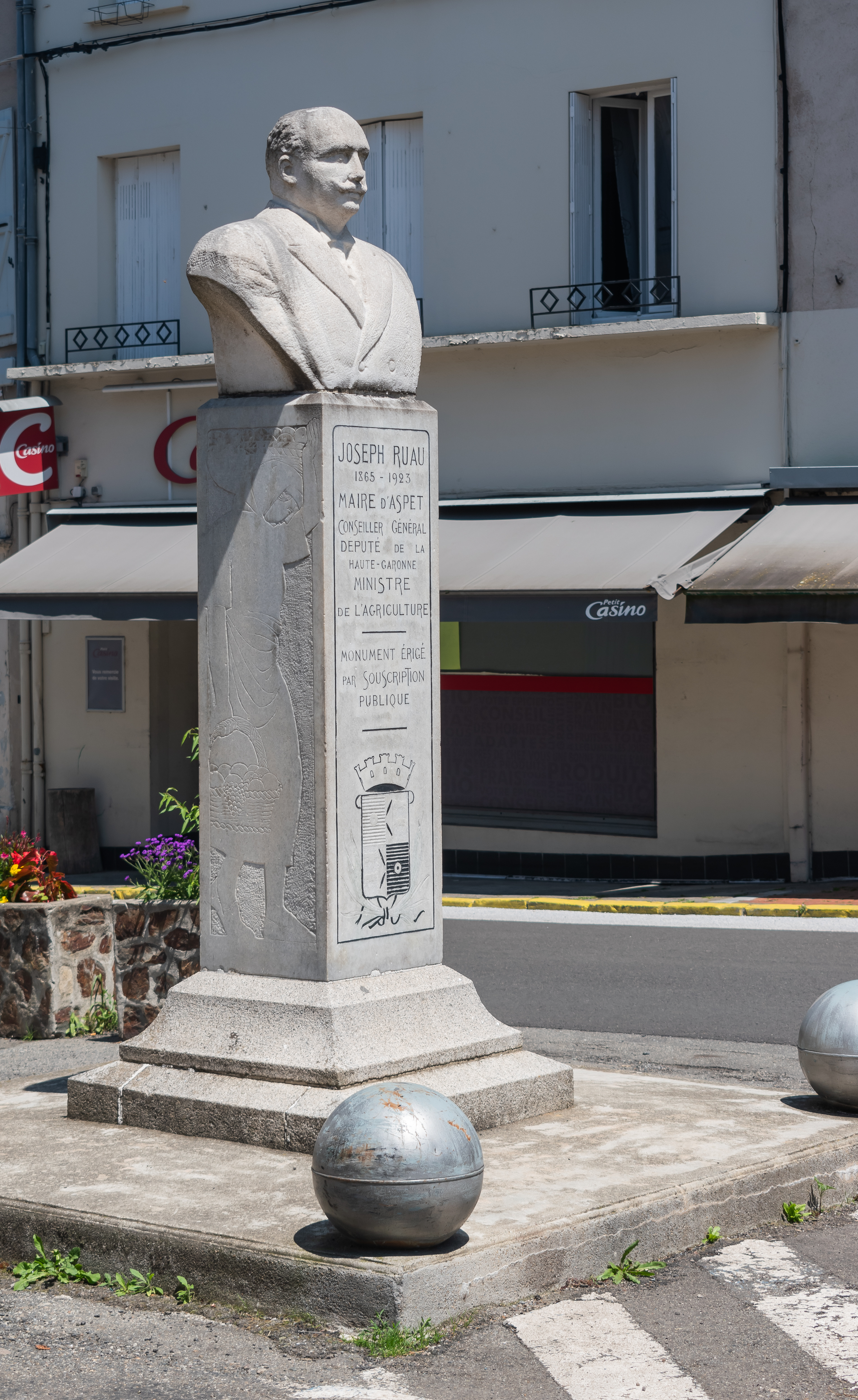
Statue of Joseph Ruau in Aspet

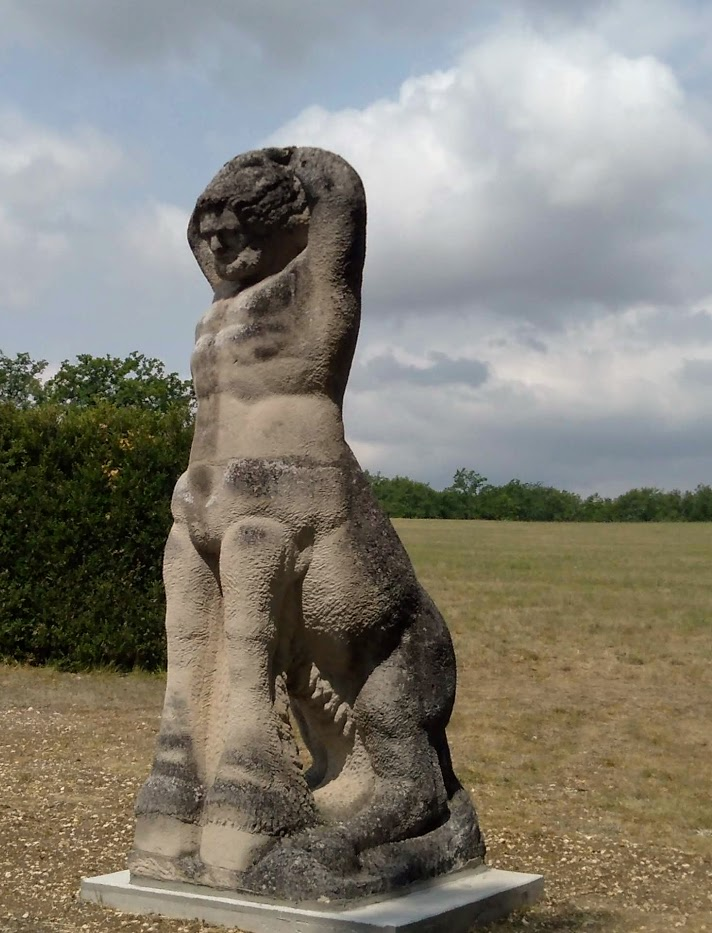
Centaur

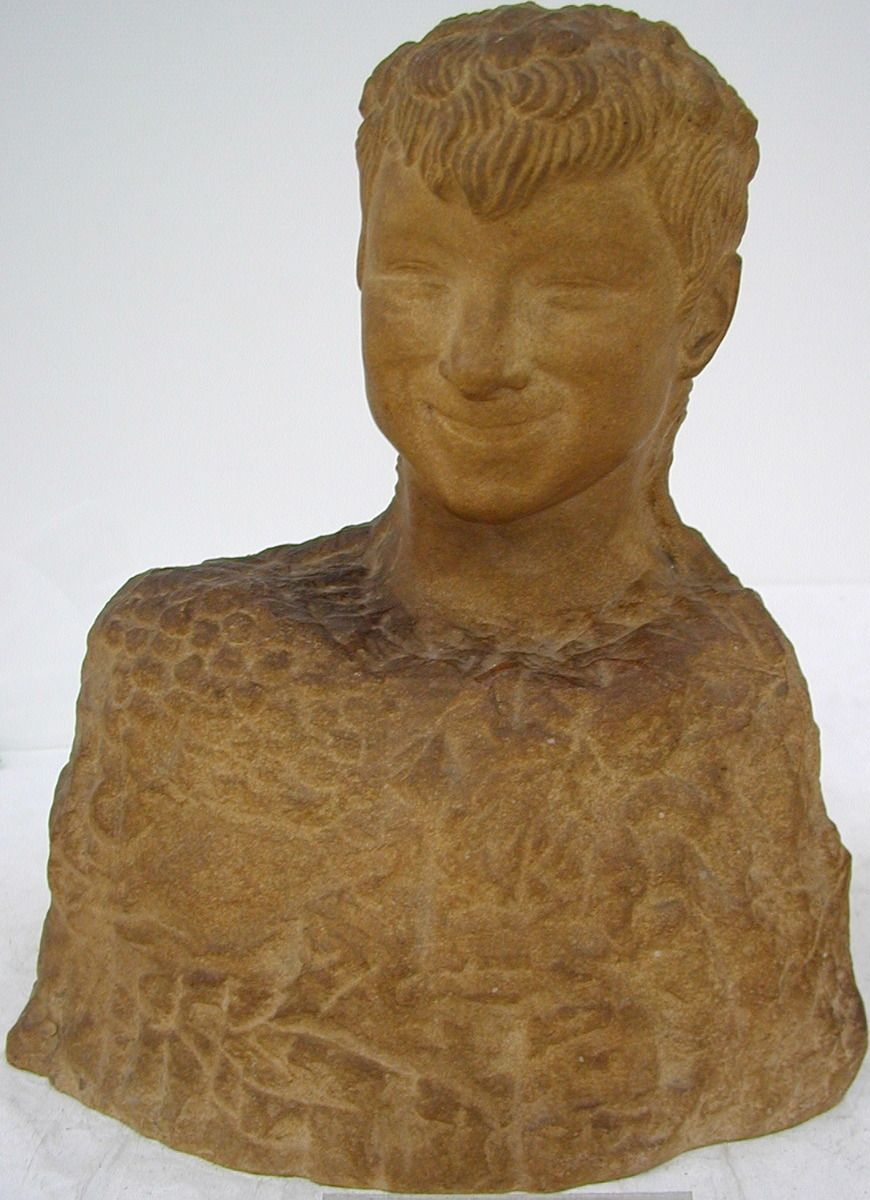
Faune

== War memorials ==
=== The war memorial of Saint-Nicolas-de-la-Grave ===
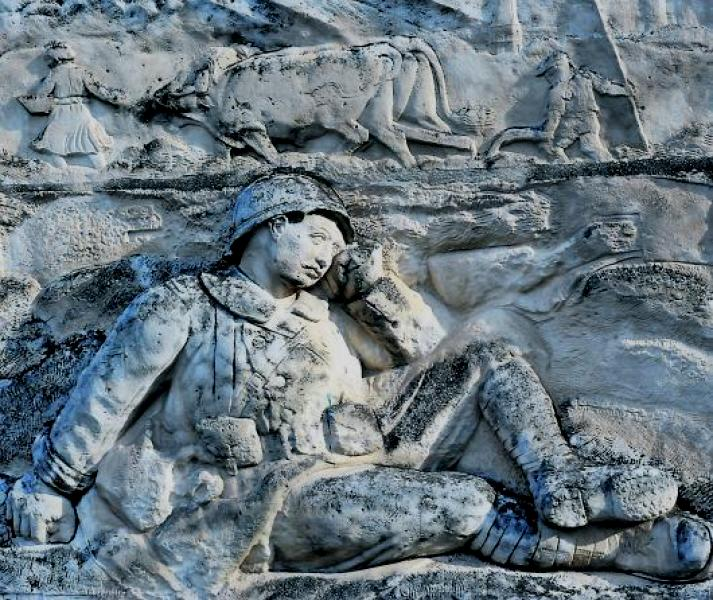
Abbal relief on Saint-Nicolas-de-la-Grave War Memorial. A soldier dreams of his farm and homeland

Abbal's composition shows a soldier in the trenches. He is sleeping and is dreaming of home and above his head we see what the soldier might well have been seeing in that dream; people at work on the farm. This war memorial was inaugurated in 1923.

=== The war memorial of Lafrançaise ===
This war memorial stands in Lafrançaise's allée du Combattant. A woman, an allegory of France, carries what appears to be an eagle's body and a German army helmet on her shoulders. A dying soldier is carved on the side of the memorial's base. The memorial has the inscriptions-"LA SOMME, LA MEUSE, VERDUN, L'ARTOIS, AUX ENFANTS DE LA FRANÇAISE, MORTS POUR LA PATRIE."

=== The war memorial at Toulouse ===
This war memorial, designed and executed by the architect Léon Jaussely, involves sculptural work by André Abbal, Camille Raynaud and Henri Raphaël Moncassin as well as ornamental sculptural work by Jean-Marie and Jean Foures. It was in August 1919 that the decision was made to erect a war memorial to remember the dead of the Haute-Garonne and initially there was much debate as to whether sculptors of a more modern style should be used or the more conservative and traditionalist sculptors such as Antoine Bourdelle. A competition was organised on the 2 October 1920 and as a result Camille Raynaud was commissioned to carry out the two high reliefs inside the memorial's arch, Abbal was asked to carve the frieze on the main face of the memorial and another on the right side whereas Moncassin was asked to carve the frieze on the reverse and left sides. It was decided to locate the memorial on the allées François-Verdier and building finally ended in 1931. The monument takes the form of an "arc de triomphe". As part of Abbal and Moncassin's friezes they include the names of some of the major battles fought- "Flandre" "Marne" "Arras" and around these names they depicted scenes associated with the battles. Abbal gave prominence to the role played by the aeroplane in the conflict and in his main scene a bi-plane takes centre stage. Moncassin gave prominence to the tank and an FT Renault tank figures in his frieze.

=== The war memorial at Canchy ===
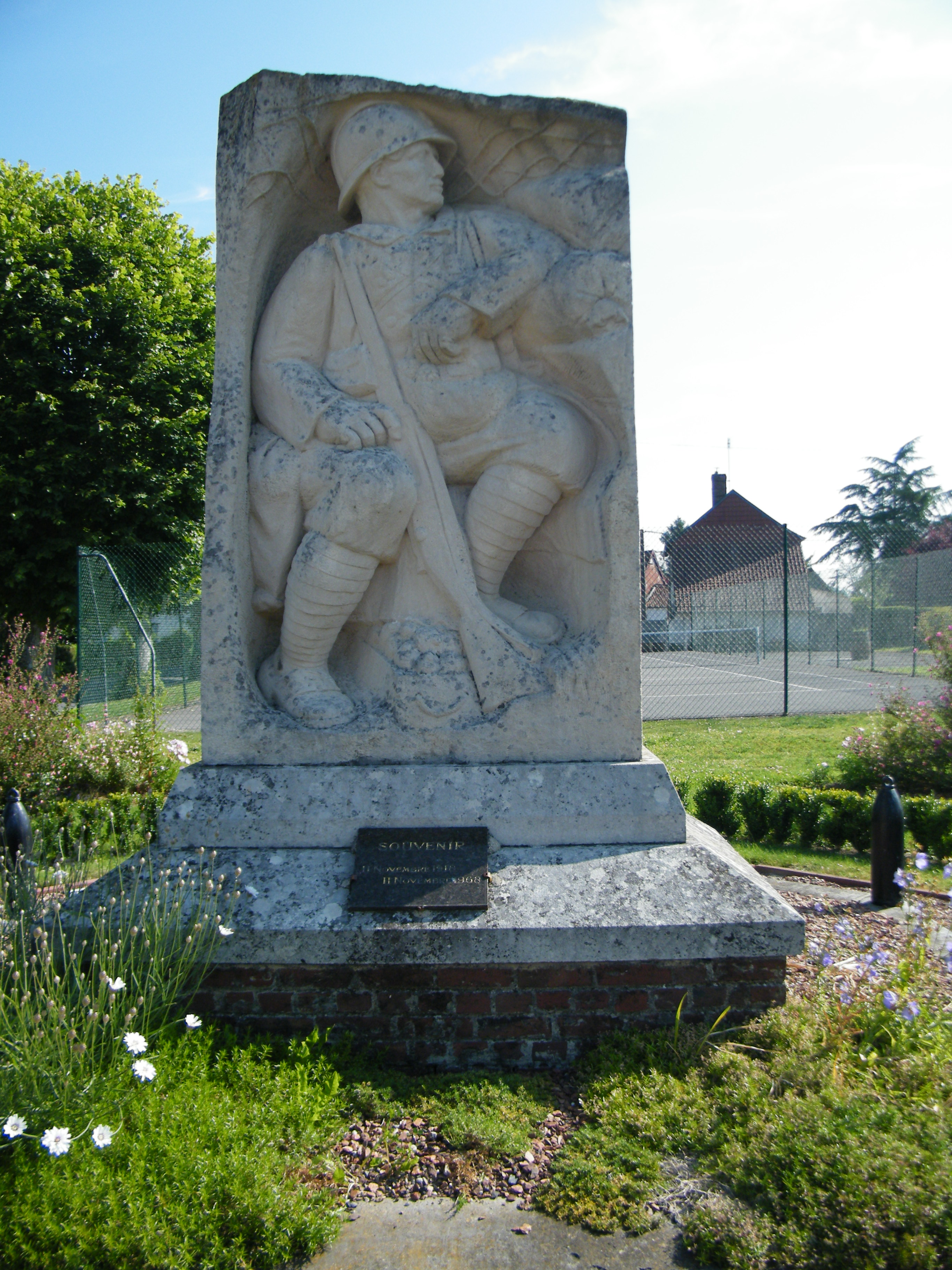
War memorial in Canchy

The war memorial of this Somme village in Picardy stands in the place Charles de Gaulle. It was erected in 1921 and Abbal carves, in relief, a soldier in his trench. On the face of the memorial Abbal carves the names of some of the main battles of the Great War of 1914-1918.

=== The war memorial at Moissac ===
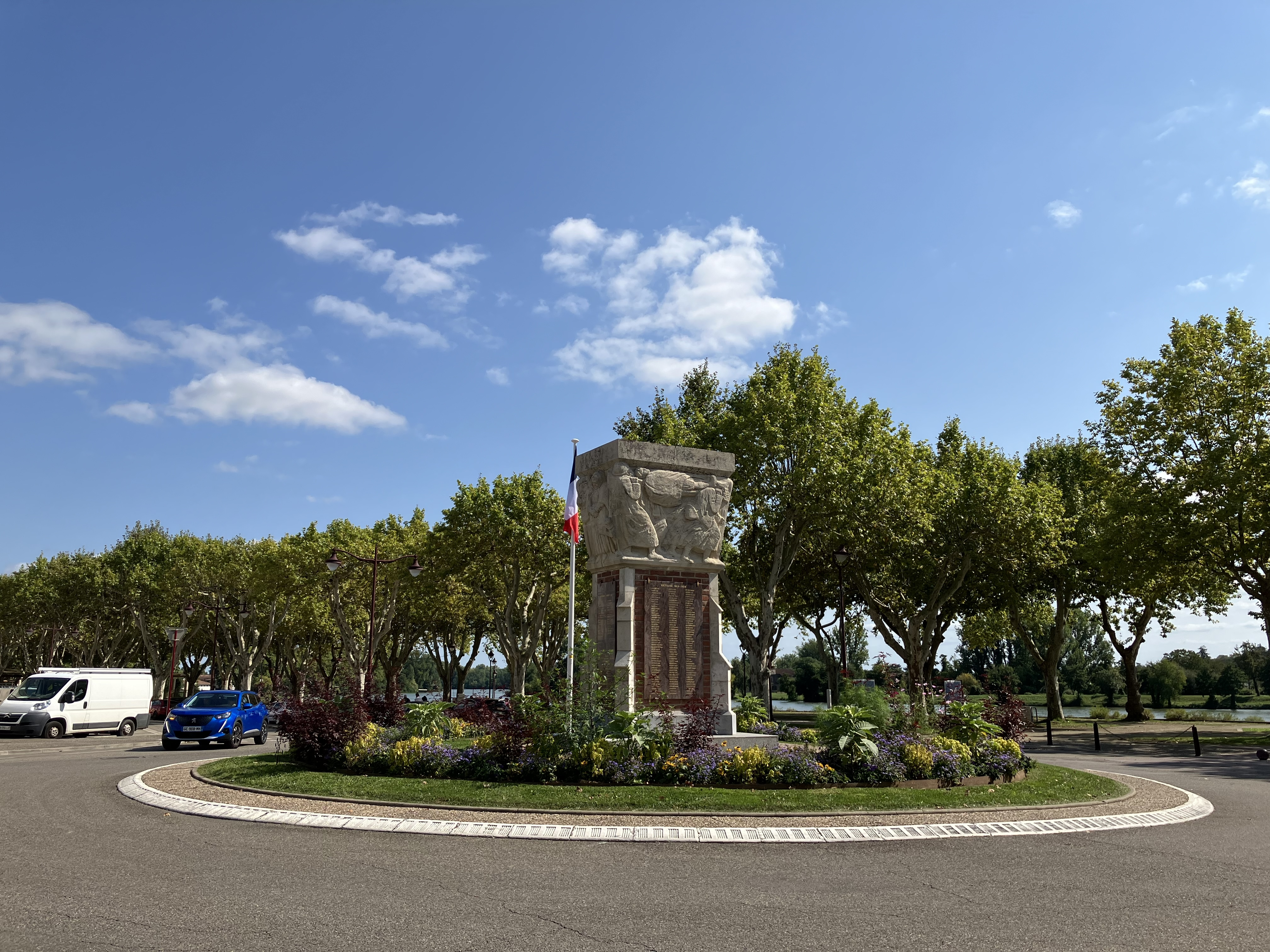
War memorial at Moissac

Abbal was chosen as the sculptor of the Moissec war memorial erected to honour those 280 men who had lain down their lives in the Great War of 1914-1918. Abbal was a natural choice having been born in the region and it possibly helped that he had himself seen service in that war: the committee organising the monument's erection would have consisted of several ex-soldiers. It was also decided by that committee that the memorial be erected in the Place de la Mairie, facing the église St Pierre and its cloister. It was in 1920 that Abbal submitted a maquette to the committee and this was placed in the mairie for the public to view. On 22 November 1925 the memorial was unveiled and at this ceremony the names of all 280 men were read out. Abbal's memorial consists of a column with bas-relief carvings on each side. On one face of the memorial, Abbal carved a scene showing a soldier departing for the front and on another Abbal depicts a grieving woman leaning over a wooden cross. On another face Abbal carves a battlefield scene with soldiers carrying one of their comrades. Finally, victory is celebrated and Abbal carves a winged angel. To the names of the 280 victims of the 1914-1918 war, another 33 names were subsequently added to cover those killed in the Second World War and 10 names of those who lost their lives in the fighting in North Africa. In 1986 it was decided to move the memorial and it now stands on the Promenade du Sancert, l'esplanade du Moulin, on the banks of the river Tarn.
