= Belmontet =

- Part of Montcuq-en-Quercy-Blanc
- Location of Belmontet
- Location within France Location within Occitanie
- Coordinates: 44°22′00″N 1°09′15″E
- Country: France
- Region: Occitania
- Department: Lot
- Arrondissement: Cahors
- Canton: Luzech
- Commune: Montcuq-en-Quercy-Blanc
- Area^{1}: 12.12 km^{2} (4.68 sq mi)
- Elevation: 194 m (636 ft)
- Highest elevation: 300 m (980 ft)
- Lowest elevation: 181 m (594 ft)
- Population (2018): 157
  - Density: 13.0/km^{2} (33.6/sq mi)
- Time zone: UTC+01:00 (CET)
  - Summer (DST): UTC+02:00 (CEST)
- Postal code: 46800
- ^{1} French Land Register data, which excludes lakes, ponds, glaciers > 1 km^{2} (0.386 sq mi or 247 acres) and river estuaries.

Belmontet (French pronunciation: [bɛlmɔ̃tɛ]; Languedocien: Bèlmontet) is a former commune in the Lot department in southwestern France. On 1 January 2016, it was merged into the new commune of Montcuq-en-Quercy-Blanc.

== Geography ==
The Séoune flows southwest through the southern part of the commune, then forms part of its southwestern border.

== See also ==
- Communes of the Lot department
