= Fauroux =

- Commune
- Coat of arms
- Location of Fauroux
- Location within France Location within Occitanie
- Coordinates: 44°14′39″N 1°00′19″E
- Country: France
- Region: Occitania
- Department: Tarn-et-Garonne
- Arrondissement: Castelsarrasin
- Canton: Pays de Serres Sud-Quercy

Government
  - Mayor (2020–2026): Pierre Vieillevigne
- Area^{1}: 13.12 km^{2} (5.07 sq mi)
- Elevation: 152 m (499 ft)
- Highest elevation: 237 m (778 ft)
- Lowest elevation: 106 m (348 ft)
- Population (2023): 189
  - Density: 14.4/km^{2} (37.3/sq mi)
- Time zone: UTC+01:00 (CET)
  - Summer (DST): UTC+02:00 (CEST)
- INSEE/Postal code: 82060 /82190
- ^{1} French Land Register data, which excludes lakes, ponds, glaciers > 1 km^{2} (0.386 sq mi or 247 acres) and river estuaries.

Fauroux (French pronunciation: [foʁu]; Occitan: Faurós) is a commune in the Tarn-et-Garonne department in the Occitanie region in southern France.

== Geography ==
The Séoune forms part of the commune's south-eastern border, then flows southwestward through the southern part of the commune.

== See also ==
- Communes of the Tarn-et-Garonne department
