= Lacour =

- Commune
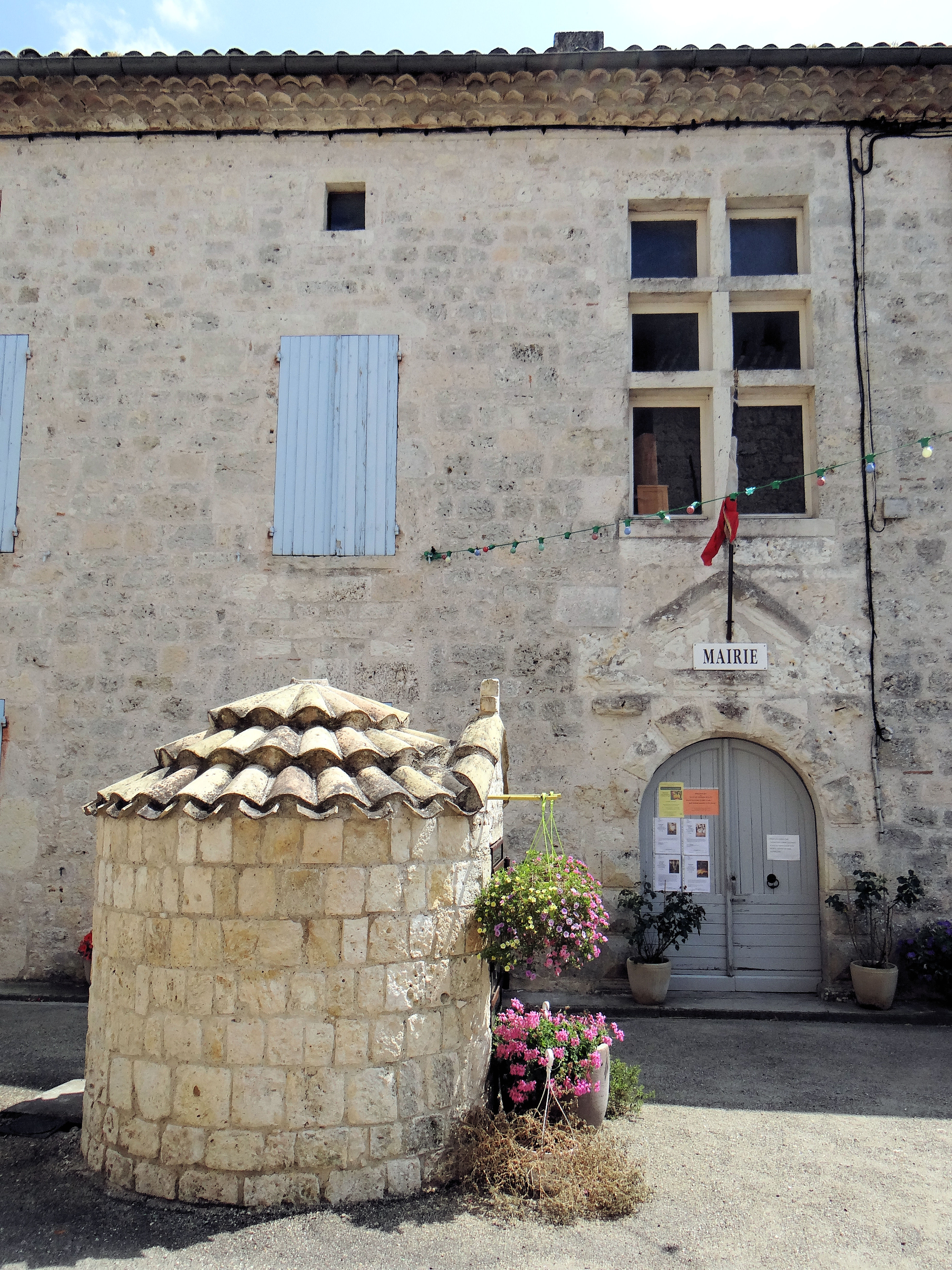
- The town hall of Lacour
- Location of Lacour
- Location within France Location within Occitanie
- Coordinates: 44°17′34″N 0°56′54″E
- Country: France
- Region: Occitania
- Department: Tarn-et-Garonne
- Arrondissement: Castelsarrasin
- Canton: Pays de Serres Sud-Quercy

Government
  - Mayor (2020–2026): Francis Vialaret
- Area^{1}: 14.33 km^{2} (5.53 sq mi)
- Elevation: 200 m (660 ft)
- Highest elevation: 233 m (764 ft)
- Lowest elevation: 106 m (348 ft)
- Population (2023): 171
  - Density: 11.9/km^{2} (30.9/sq mi)
- Time zone: UTC+01:00 (CET)
  - Summer (DST): UTC+02:00 (CEST)
- INSEE/Postal code: 82084 /82190
- ^{1} French Land Register data, which excludes lakes, ponds, glaciers > 1 km^{2} (0.386 sq mi or 247 acres) and river estuaries.

Lacour (Languedocien: La Cort) is a commune in the Tarn-et-Garonne department in the Occitanie region in southern France.

== See also ==
- Communes of the Tarn-et-Garonne department
