= Vazerac =

- Commune
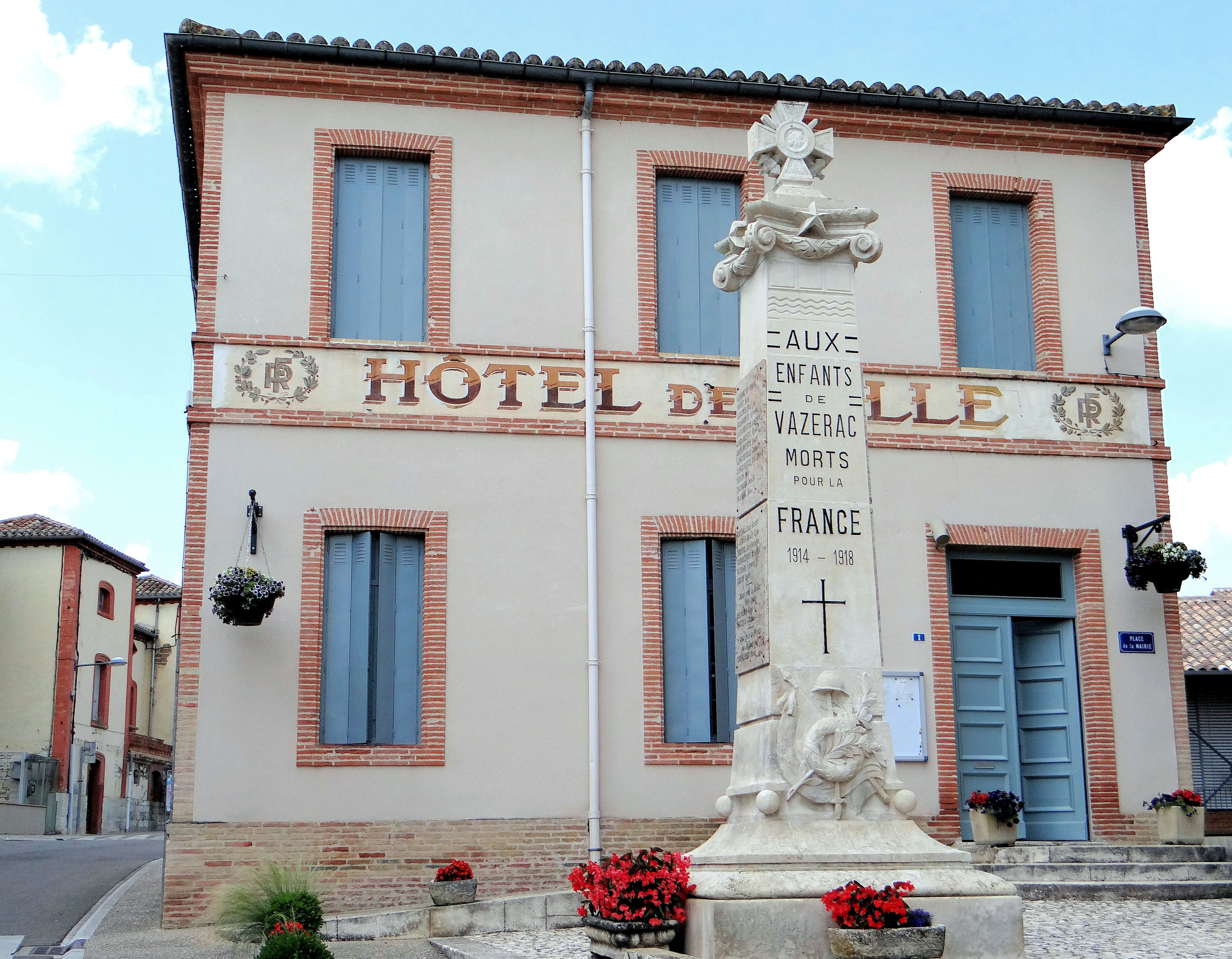
- The town hall of Vazerac and the war memorial
- Location of Vazerac
- Location within France Location within Occitanie
- Coordinates: 44°11′30″N 1°17′08″E
- Country: France
- Region: Occitania
- Department: Tarn-et-Garonne
- Arrondissement: Montauban
- Canton: Pays de Serres Sud-Quercy
- Intercommunality: CC du Pays de Lafrançaise

Government
  - Mayor (2020–2026): Christian Lestrade
- Area^{1}: 32.68 km^{2} (12.62 sq mi)
- Elevation: 83 m (272 ft)
- Highest elevation: 266 m (873 ft)
- Lowest elevation: 93 m (305 ft)
- Population (2023): 765
  - Density: 23.4/km^{2} (60.6/sq mi)
- Time zone: UTC+01:00 (CET)
  - Summer (DST): UTC+02:00 (CEST)
- INSEE/Postal code: 82189 /82220
- ^{1} French Land Register data, which excludes lakes, ponds, glaciers > 1 km^{2} (0.386 sq mi or 247 acres) and river estuaries.

Vazerac (French pronunciation: [vaz(ə)ʁak]; Occitan: Vasarac) is a commune in the Tarn-et-Garonne department in the Occitanie region in southern France.

== See also ==
- Communes of the Tarn-et-Garonne department
