= Montcuq =

Commune in Lot, France

- Part of Montcuq-en-Quercy-Blanc
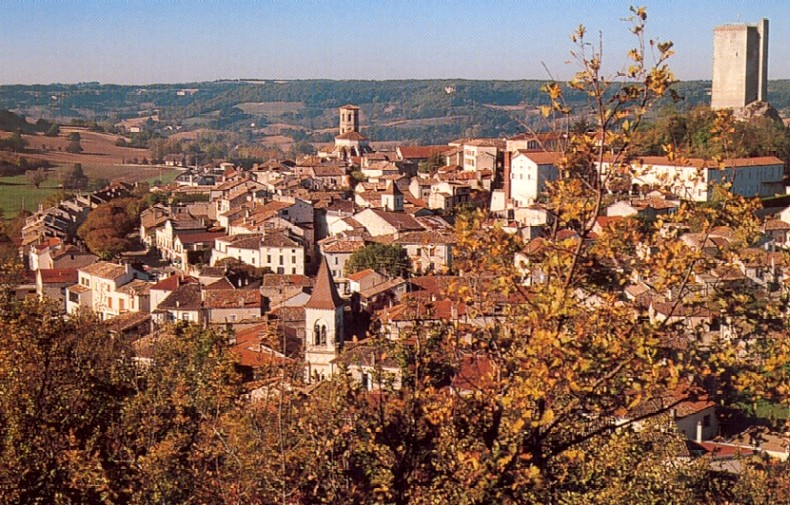
- A general view of Montcuq

- Coat of arms
- Location of Montcuq
- Location within France Location within Occitanie
- Coordinates: 44°20′23″N 1°12′37″E
- Country: France
- Region: Occitania
- Department: Lot
- Arrondissement: Cahors
- Canton: Luzech
- Commune: Montcuq-en-Quercy-Blanc
- Area^{1}: 32.22 km^{2} (12.44 sq mi)
- Elevation: 160 m (520 ft)
- Highest elevation: 291 m (955 ft)
- Lowest elevation: 135 m (443 ft)
- Population (2018): 1,220
  - Density: 37.9/km^{2} (98.1/sq mi)
- Time zone: UTC+01:00 (CET)
  - Summer (DST): UTC+02:00 (CEST)
- Postal code: 46800
- ^{1} French Land Register data, which excludes lakes, ponds, glaciers > 1 km^{2} (0.386 sq mi or 247 acres) and river estuaries.

Montcuq (French pronunciation: [mɔ̃kyk] or [mɔ̃ky]; Lengadocian: Montcuc) is a town and former commune in the Lot department in south-western France, lying 25 kilometres (16 mi) outside Cahors. On 1 January 2016, it was merged into the new commune of Montcuq-en-Quercy-Blanc. Its residents are known as Montcuquois.

The town remains vibrant and a popular tourist destination, in part because its name, in standard French pronunciation, is homophonic with mon cul, meaning my arse.

Montcuq still has a rich agricultural industry, and is known for its manufacture of meringues and gaufres de Saint Daumes waffles.

The town's name could derive from the Latin Mont Circus Vallium, Mont Cuneus or montem cuci, meaning "cuckoo mountain".

== History ==
The town's foundation dates back to at least Roman times.

A stronghold of the Cathars, Montcuq received its charter from Raymond VI in the 12th century. On 1 June 1212 Simon de Montfort took the castle after it had been deserted by its defenders, and gave it to Beaudouin, half-brother of the Count of Toulouse, an ally of the Crusaders.

On 17 February 1214 Beaudouin marched on the Château de Lolmie, and after a short battle was arrested by Ratier de Castelnau, despite also being an ally of Montfort. Transported to Montcuq and deprived of food, he refused to order his soldiers to surrender. The garrison offered to surrender if their lives were spared, but they were soon massacred. Beaudouin was taken to Montauban and hanged at his brother's command.

After the Treaty of Meaux in 1229, the French king rebuilt the walls of both the town and castle. Only the keep of the castle remains nowadays.

The castle was retaken several times by the English during the 14th century, and in the 16th century was plundered by the Huguenots.

Singer, actor and pop/rock musician Nino Ferrer lived in a bastide near Montcuq.

English writer, comedian and musician Neil Innes lived in Montcuq during the last years of his life, before dying there in December 2019.

== Geography ==
The village lies in the middle of the commune, above the left bank of the Barguelonnette, which flows southwestward through the commune. The Séoune forms part of the commune's northern border.

== In popular culture ==
In a well-known skit (1976), Daniel Prévost in the TV show Le petit rapporteur animated by Jacques Martin, visited the town and joked by asking the Montcuquois questions such as: "Is Montcuq well lit? Because I've heard that it is sometimes gloomy...". In standard French, Montcuq is pronounced the same as mon cul, meaning my arse. However, the locals used to speak Occitan in which language, and in the local dialect even today, the 'q' is pronounced [k].

In 2007, Hasbro, the company that manufactures the Monopoly game in France, had the idea to have the online community choose the cities that will appear on the new version of the game. Montcuq by far won the most votes (52879 votes), well ahead of Dunkirk with 30640 votes and Reims (20727 votes). Hasbro, however, decided it had "played long enough with web 2.0" and had "decided to maintain its editorial line and to develop products that fit a commercial demand", so decided to leave out Montcuq from the board game. Hasbro has nonetheless decided to issue an all-Montcuq edition.

== See also ==
- Communes of the Lot department
