= Touffailles =

- Commune
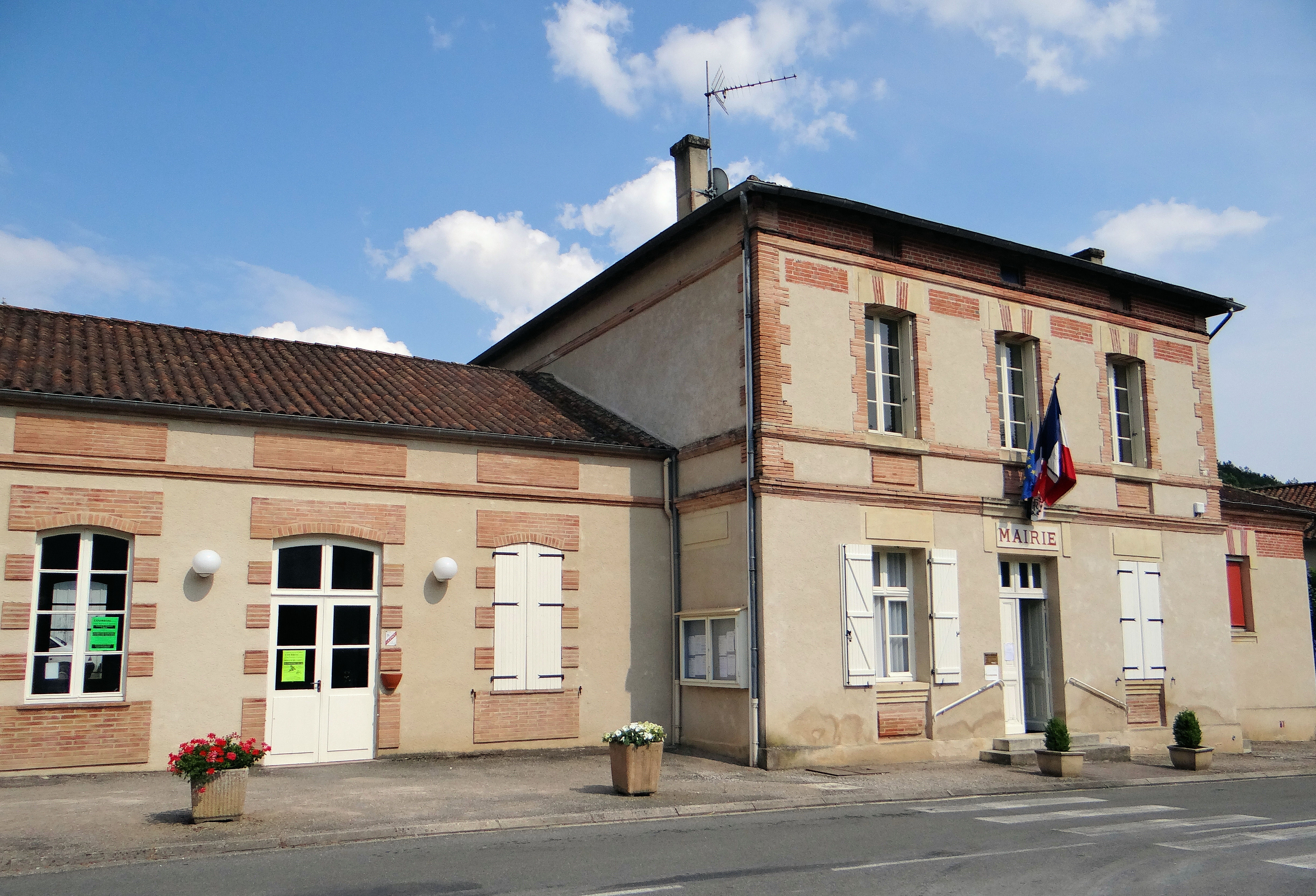
- The town hall of Touffailles

- Coat of arms
- Location of Touffailles
- Location within France Location within Occitanie
- Coordinates: 44°16′26″N 1°03′05″E
- Country: France
- Region: Occitania
- Department: Tarn-et-Garonne
- Arrondissement: Castelsarrasin
- Canton: Pays de Serres Sud-Quercy

Government
  - Mayor (2020–2026): Jean-Michel Barreau
- Area^{1}: 24.34 km^{2} (9.40 sq mi)
- Elevation: 220 m (720 ft)
- Highest elevation: 276 m (906 ft)
- Lowest elevation: 118 m (387 ft)
- Population (2023): 330
  - Density: 14/km^{2} (35/sq mi)
- Time zone: UTC+01:00 (CET)
  - Summer (DST): UTC+02:00 (CEST)
- INSEE/Postal code: 82182 /82190
- ^{1} French Land Register data, which excludes lakes, ponds, glaciers > 1 km^{2} (0.386 sq mi or 247 acres) and river estuaries.

Touffailles (French pronunciation: [tufaj]; Occitan: Tofalhas) is a commune in the Tarn-et-Garonne department in the Occitanie region in southern France.

== Geography ==
The Séoune forms parts of the commune's south-eastern border.

== See also ==
- Communes of the Tarn-et-Garonne department
