= Montcuq-en-Quercy-Blanc =

- Commune
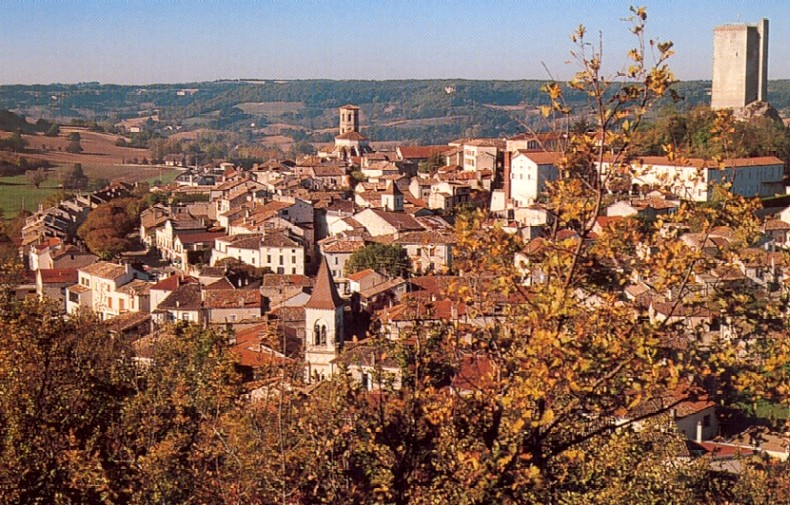
- A general view of Montcuq
- Location of Montcuq-en-Quercy-Blanc
- Location within France Location within Occitanie
- Coordinates: 44°20′17″N 1°12′36″E
- Country: France
- Region: Occitania
- Department: Lot
- Arrondissement: Cahors
- Canton: Luzech

Government
  - Mayor (2020–2026): Alain Lalabarde
- Area^{1}: 78.23 km^{2} (30.20 sq mi)
- Population (2023): 1,816
  - Density: 23.21/km^{2} (60.12/sq mi)
- Time zone: UTC+01:00 (CET)
  - Summer (DST): UTC+02:00 (CEST)
- INSEE/Postal code: 46201 /46800
- ^{1} French Land Register data, which excludes lakes, ponds, glaciers > 1 km^{2} (0.386 sq mi or 247 acres) and river estuaries.

Montcuq-en-Quercy-Blanc (French pronunciation: [mɔ̃kyk ɑ̃ kɛʁsi blɑ̃]; Languedocien: Montcuc en Carcin Blanc) is a commune in the department of Lot, southern France. The municipality was established on 1 January 2016 by merger of the former communes of Montcuq, Belmontet, Lebreil, Sainte-Croix and Valprionde.

== See also ==
- Communes of the Lot department
