= Valprionde =

- Part of Montcuq-en-Quercy-Blanc
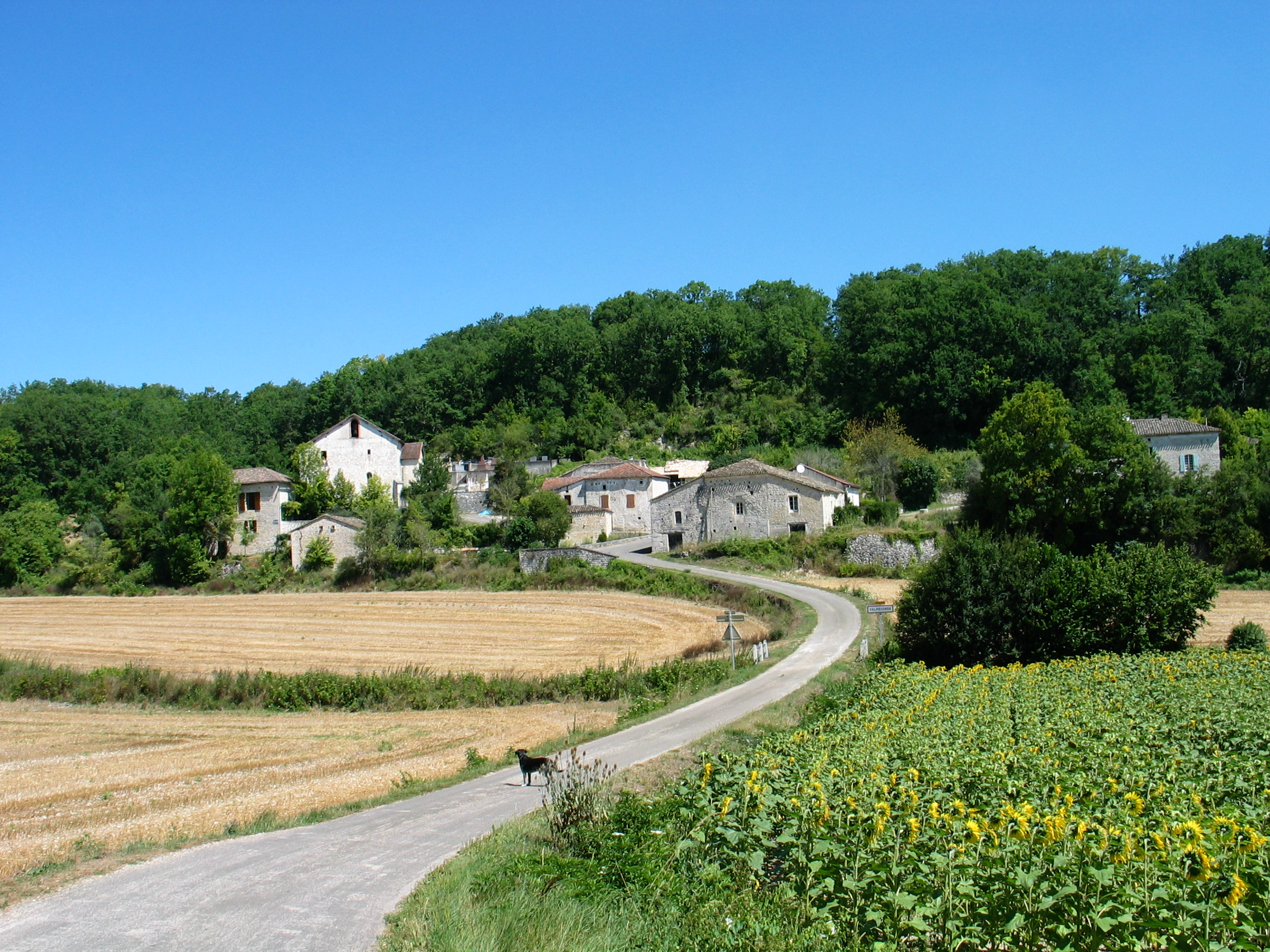
- The village and the church
- Location of Valprionde
- Location within France Location within Occitanie
- Coordinates: 44°20′59″N 1°07′12″E
- Country: France
- Region: Occitania
- Department: Lot
- Arrondissement: Cahors
- Canton: Luzech
- Commune: Montcuq-en-Quercy-Blanc
- Area^{1}: 15.92 km^{2} (6.15 sq mi)
- Elevation: 266 m (873 ft)
- Highest elevation: 285 m (935 ft)
- Lowest elevation: 167 m (548 ft)
- Population (2018): 126
  - Density: 7.91/km^{2} (20.5/sq mi)
- Time zone: UTC+01:00 (CET)
  - Summer (DST): UTC+02:00 (CEST)
- Postal code: 46800
- ^{1} French Land Register data, which excludes lakes, ponds, glaciers > 1 km^{2} (0.386 sq mi or 247 acres) and river estuaries.

Valprionde (French pronunciation: [valpʁijɔ̃d]; Languedocien: Valpronda) is a former commune in the Lot department in south-western France.

On 1 January 2016, it was merged into the new commune of Montcuq-en-Quercy-Blanc. Its population was 126 in 2018.

== Geography ==
The Séoune flows southwestward through the middle of the commune.

== See also ==
- Communes of the Lot department
