= Labarthe, Tarn-et-Garonne =

Labarthe
- Commune
- Location of Labarthe
- Location within France Location within Occitanie
- Coordinates: 44°12′33″N 1°19′06″E
- Country: France
- Region: Occitania
- Department: Tarn-et-Garonne
- Arrondissement: Montauban
- Canton: Pays de Serres Sud-Quercy
- Intercommunality: CC du Pays de Lafrançaise

Government
  - Mayor (2020–2026): André Bernadou
- Area^{1}: 23.24 km^{2} (8.97 sq mi)
- Elevation: 158 m (518 ft)
- Highest elevation: 242 m (794 ft)
- Lowest elevation: 105 m (344 ft)
- Population (2023): 381
  - Density: 16.4/km^{2} (42.5/sq mi)
- Time zone: UTC+01:00 (CET)
  - Summer (DST): UTC+02:00 (CEST)
- INSEE/Postal code: 82077 /82220
- ^{1} French Land Register data, which excludes lakes, ponds, glaciers > 1 km^{2} (0.386 sq mi or 247 acres) and river estuaries.

Labarthe (French pronunciation: [labaʁt]; Occitan: La Barta) is a commune in the Tarn-et-Garonne department in the Occitanie region in southern France.

== Geography ==
The town is located along the Upper Quercy bordering with the department of Lot on Lupte and Lemboulas.

The productions are very varied and include livestock, vineyards, orchards, market gardens, and organic crops. The terrain consists of hilly woods, and the farmland provides a wide variety of landscapes.

== See also ==
- Communes of the Tarn-et-Garonne department
