= Carnac-Rouffiac =

- Commune
- Location of Carnac-Rouffiac
- Location within France Location within Occitanie
- Coordinates: 44°24′53″N 1°13′57″E
- Country: France
- Region: Occitania
- Department: Lot
- Arrondissement: Cahors
- Canton: Luzech
- Intercommunality: Vallée du Lot et Vignoble

Government
  - Mayor (2020–2026): Mathieu Molinié
- Area^{1}: 13.57 km^{2} (5.24 sq mi)
- Elevation: 270 m (890 ft)
- Highest elevation: 300 m (980 ft)
- Lowest elevation: 130 m (430 ft)
- Population (2023): 231
  - Density: 17.0/km^{2} (44.1/sq mi)
- Time zone: UTC+01:00 (CET)
  - Summer (DST): UTC+02:00 (CEST)
- INSEE/Postal code: 46060 /46140
- ^{1} French Land Register data, which excludes lakes, ponds, glaciers > 1 km^{2} (0.386 sq mi or 247 acres) and river estuaries.

Carnac-Rouffiac (French pronunciation: [kaʁnak ʁufjak]; Occitan: Carnac e Rofiac) is a commune in the Lot department in south-western France.

== Geography ==
The Séoune forms most of the commune's south-eastern border.

== See also ==
- Communes of the Lot department
