= Saint-Beauzeil =

- Commune
- Location of Saint-Beauzeil
- Location within France Location within Occitanie
- Coordinates: 44°20′04″N 0°54′00″E
- Country: France
- Region: Occitania
- Department: Tarn-et-Garonne
- Arrondissement: Castelsarrasin
- Canton: Pays de Serres Sud-Quercy

Government
  - Mayor (2020–2026): Benjamin Bonifay
- Area^{1}: 9.84 km^{2} (3.80 sq mi)
- Elevation: 207 m (679 ft)
- Highest elevation: 240 m (790 ft)
- Lowest elevation: 127 m (417 ft)
- Population (2023): 117
  - Density: 11.9/km^{2} (30.8/sq mi)
- Time zone: UTC+01:00 (CET)
  - Summer (DST): UTC+02:00 (CEST)
- INSEE/Postal code: 82157 /82150
- ^{1} French Land Register data, which excludes lakes, ponds, glaciers > 1 km^{2} (0.386 sq mi or 247 acres) and river estuaries.

Saint-Beauzeil is a commune in the Tarn-et-Garonne department in the Occitania region in southern France. Saint-Beauzeil is a very sparsely populated rural commune.

Residents are called Saint-Beauzeillois in French.

== See also ==
- Communes of the Tarn-et-Garonne department
