= Sainte-Croix, Lot =

Sainte-Croix
- Part of Montcuq-en-Quercy-Blanc
- Location of Sainte-Croix
- Location within France Location within Occitanie
- Coordinates: 44°20′25″N 1°10′01″E
- Country: France
- Region: Occitania
- Department: Lot
- Arrondissement: Cahors
- Canton: Luzech
- Commune: Montcuq-en-Quercy-Blanc
- Area^{1}: 7.77 km^{2} (3.00 sq mi)
- Elevation: 200 m (660 ft)
- Highest elevation: 280 m (920 ft)
- Lowest elevation: 164 m (538 ft)
- Population (2018): 76
  - Density: 9.8/km^{2} (25/sq mi)
- Time zone: UTC+01:00 (CET)
  - Summer (DST): UTC+02:00 (CEST)
- Postal code: 46800
- ^{1} French Land Register data, which excludes lakes, ponds, glaciers > 1 km^{2} (0.386 sq mi or 247 acres) and river estuaries.

Sainte-Croix (French pronunciation: [sɛ̃t kʁwa]; Languedocien: Senta Crotz) is a former commune in the Lot department in south-western France. On 1 January 2016, it was merged into the new commune of Montcuq-en-Quercy-Blanc. Its population was 76 in 2018.

== See also ==
- Communes of the Lot department
