= Saint-Amans-du-Pech =

- Commune
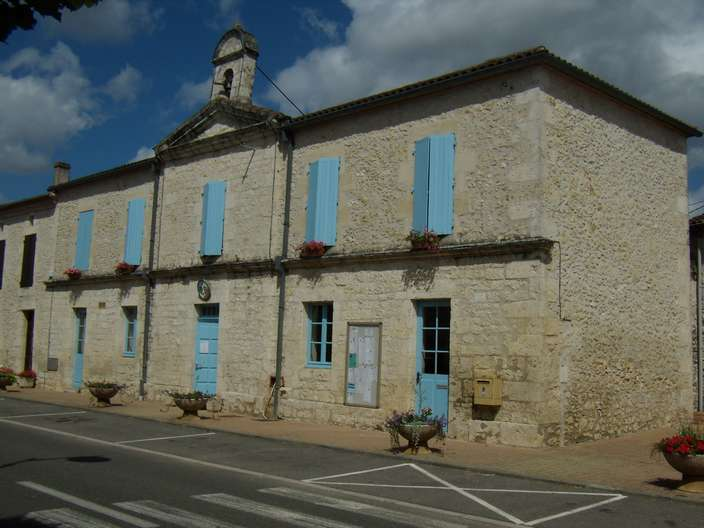
- The town hall of Saint-Amans-du-Pech

- Coat of arms
- Location of Saint-Amans-du-Pech
- Location within France Location within Occitanie
- Coordinates: 44°19′02″N 0°53′24″E
- Country: France
- Region: Occitania
- Department: Tarn-et-Garonne
- Arrondissement: Castelsarrasin
- Canton: Pays de Serres Sud-Quercy

Government
  - Mayor (2020–2026): Bernard Regnard
- Area^{1}: 6.76 km^{2} (2.61 sq mi)
- Elevation: 300 m (980 ft)
- Highest elevation: 228 m (748 ft)
- Lowest elevation: 99 m (325 ft)
- Population (2023): 236
  - Density: 34.9/km^{2} (90.4/sq mi)
- Time zone: UTC+01:00 (CET)
  - Summer (DST): UTC+02:00 (CEST)
- INSEE/Postal code: 82153 /82150
- ^{1} French Land Register data, which excludes lakes, ponds, glaciers > 1 km^{2} (0.386 sq mi or 247 acres) and river estuaries.

Saint-Amans-du-Pech (Languedocien: Sent Amanç del Puèg) is a commune in the Tarn-et-Garonne department in the Occitanie region in southern France.

== See also ==
- Communes of the Tarn-et-Garonne department
