= Roquecor =

- Commune
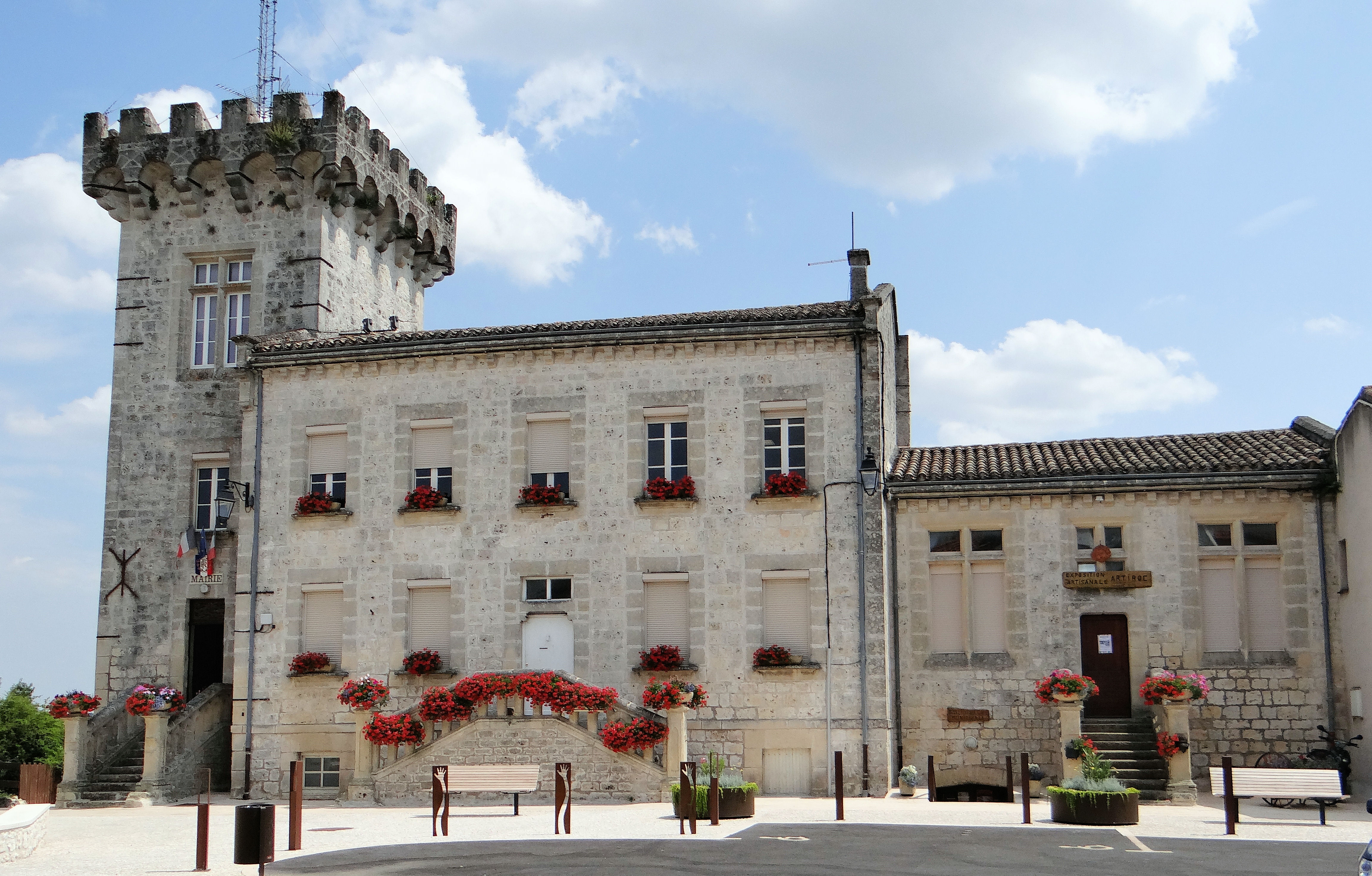
- The town hall of Roquecor

- Coat of arms
- Location of Roquecor
- Location within France Location within Occitanie
- Coordinates: 44°19′22″N 0°56′39″E
- Country: France
- Region: Occitania
- Department: Tarn-et-Garonne
- Arrondissement: Castelsarrasin
- Canton: Pays de Serres Sud-Quercy

Government
  - Mayor (2020–2026): Jean-Pierre Villeneuve
- Area^{1}: 20.55 km^{2} (7.93 sq mi)
- Elevation: 192 m (630 ft)
- Highest elevation: 265 m (869 ft)
- Lowest elevation: 106 m (348 ft)
- Population (2023): 400
  - Density: 19/km^{2} (50/sq mi)
- Time zone: UTC+01:00 (CET)
  - Summer (DST): UTC+02:00 (CEST)
- INSEE/Postal code: 82151 /82150
- ^{1} French Land Register data, which excludes lakes, ponds, glaciers > 1 km^{2} (0.386 sq mi or 247 acres) and river estuaries.

Roquecor (French pronunciation: [ʁɔk(ə)kɔʁ]; Occitan: Recacòrn) is a commune in the Tarn-et-Garonne department in the Occitanie region in southern France.

== See also ==
- Communes of the Tarn-et-Garonne department
