= Belvèze =

- Commune
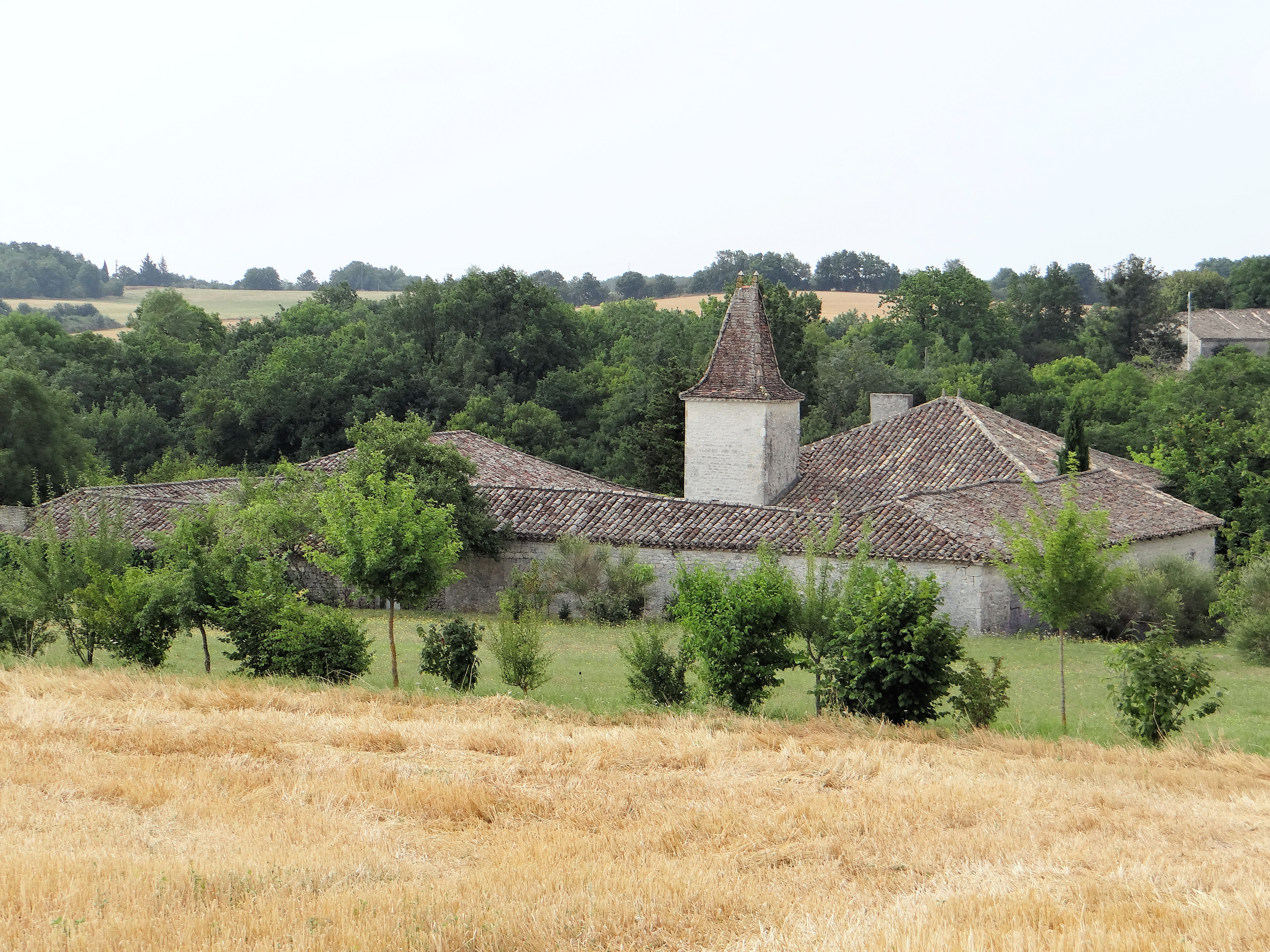
- A general view of Belvèze

- Coat of arms
- Location of Belvèze
- Location within France Location within Occitanie
- Coordinates: 44°19′50″N 1°05′32″E
- Country: France
- Region: Occitania
- Department: Tarn-et-Garonne
- Arrondissement: Castelsarrasin
- Canton: Pays de Serres Sud-Quercy
- Intercommunality: Pays de Serres en Quercy

Government
  - Mayor (2020–2026): Claude Veril
- Area^{1}: 13.88 km^{2} (5.36 sq mi)
- Elevation: 190 m (620 ft)
- Highest elevation: 271 m (889 ft)
- Lowest elevation: 154 m (505 ft)
- Population (2023): 221
  - Density: 15.9/km^{2} (41.2/sq mi)
- Time zone: UTC+01:00 (CET)
  - Summer (DST): UTC+02:00 (CEST)
- INSEE/Postal code: 82016 /82150
- ^{1} French Land Register data, which excludes lakes, ponds, glaciers > 1 km^{2} (0.386 sq mi or 247 acres) and river estuaries.

Belvèze (French pronunciation: [bɛlvɛz]; Occitan: Velbaser) is a commune in the Tarn-et-Garonne department in the Occitanie region in southern France.

== Geography ==
The Séoune flows southward through the eastern part of the commune.

== See also ==
- Communes of the Tarn-et-Garonne department
