= Canton of Pays de Serres Sud-Quercy =

Coordinates: 44.13°N 1.24°E

The canton of Pays de Serres Sud-Quercy is an administrative division of the Tarn-et-Garonne department, in southern France. It was created at the French canton reorganisation which came into effect in March 2015. Its seat is in Lafrançaise.

It consists of the following communes:

1. Belvèze
2. Bouloc-en-Quercy
3. Cazes-Mondenard
4. Durfort-Lacapelette
5. Fauroux
6. Labarthe
7. Lacour
8. Lafrançaise
9. Lauzerte
10. Miramont-de-Quercy
11. Montagudet
12. Montaigu-de-Quercy
13. Montbarla
14. Puycornet
15. Roquecor
16. Saint-Amans-de-Pellagal
17. Saint-Amans-du-Pech
18. Saint-Beauzeil
19. Sainte-Juliette
20. Sauveterre
21. Touffailles
22. Tréjouls
23. Valeilles
24. Vazerac
