= Saint-Maurin =

- Commune
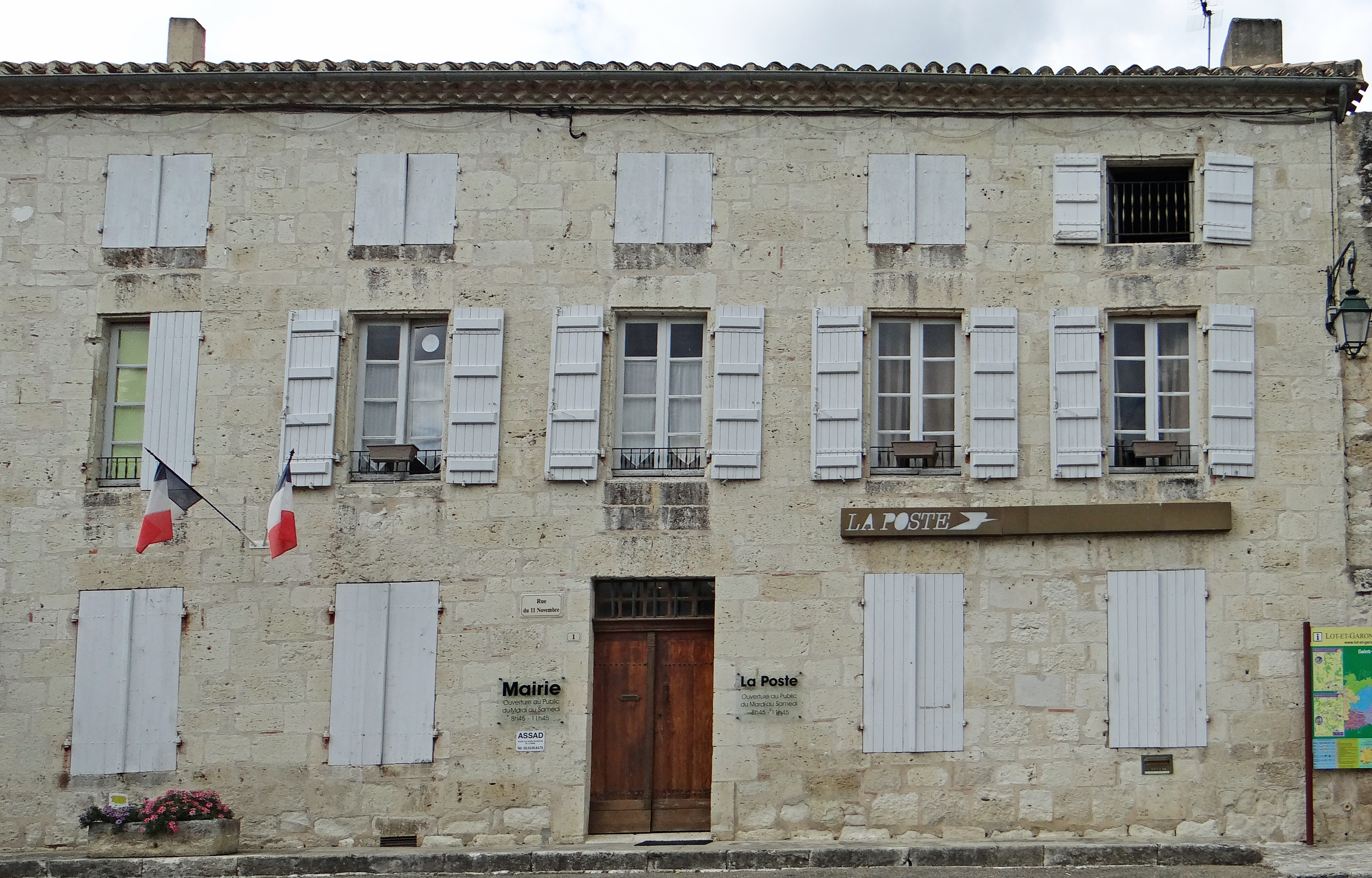
- The town hall in Saint-Maurin

- Coat of arms
- Location of Saint-Maurin
- Location within France Location within Nouvelle-Aquitaine
- Coordinates: 44°12′31″N 0°53′36″E
- Country: France
- Region: Nouvelle-Aquitaine
- Department: Lot-et-Garonne
- Arrondissement: Agen
- Canton: Le Pays de Serres
- Intercommunality: Agglomération d'Agen

Government
  - Mayor (2020–2026): Jean-Claude Malcayran
- Area^{1}: 21.74 km^{2} (8.39 sq mi)
- Elevation: 102 m (335 ft)
- Highest elevation: 220 m (720 ft)
- Lowest elevation: 72 m (236 ft)
- Population (2023): 377
  - Density: 17.3/km^{2} (44.9/sq mi)
- Time zone: UTC+01:00 (CET)
  - Summer (DST): UTC+02:00 (CEST)
- INSEE/Postal code: 47260 /47270
- ^{1} French Land Register data, which excludes lakes, ponds, glaciers > 1 km^{2} (0.386 sq mi or 247 acres) and river estuaries.

Saint-Maurin (French pronunciation: [sɛ̃ moʁɛ̃]; Occitan: Sent Maurin) is a commune in the Lot-et-Garonne department in south-western France.

The village lies on the road from Agen to Bourg-de-Visa in the valley of the Escornebœuf, a tributary of the Séoune. It is in the arrondissement of Agen and the region Nouvelle-Aquitaine. The population is around 450.

== History ==
Saint-Maurin, the only village in France of that name, is named after the saint to whom the village's 11th-century abbey is dedicated. The abbey, parts of which still stand beside the village square, was built by Benedictine monks. Reliefs cut into the stone of an archway portray Maurin having the top of his head cut off and his brain spooned out.

The abbey was destroyed in the Albigeois war against the cathars, then rebuilt. It was again ravaged in the 14th century by English troops in the Hundred Years War. It was again rebuilt in the 15th century and subsequently attacked by Huguenots in the French Wars of Religion.

The abbey passed into the ownership of the village in 1645 and was never rebuilt. Many of the walls were demolished as a source of building stone but much of the main arch still stands. The monks' garden exists and so do the stables, now houses. The abbey is now a Monument de France and is being restored.

Beneath and beside the town hall is a museum of artifacts from the village's agricultural past. The village has a school, sports ground, swimming pool and small businesses.

== Geography ==
The Séoune forms the commune's southern border.

== See also ==
- Communes of the Lot-et-Garonne department
