= Montaigu-de-Quercy =

- Commune
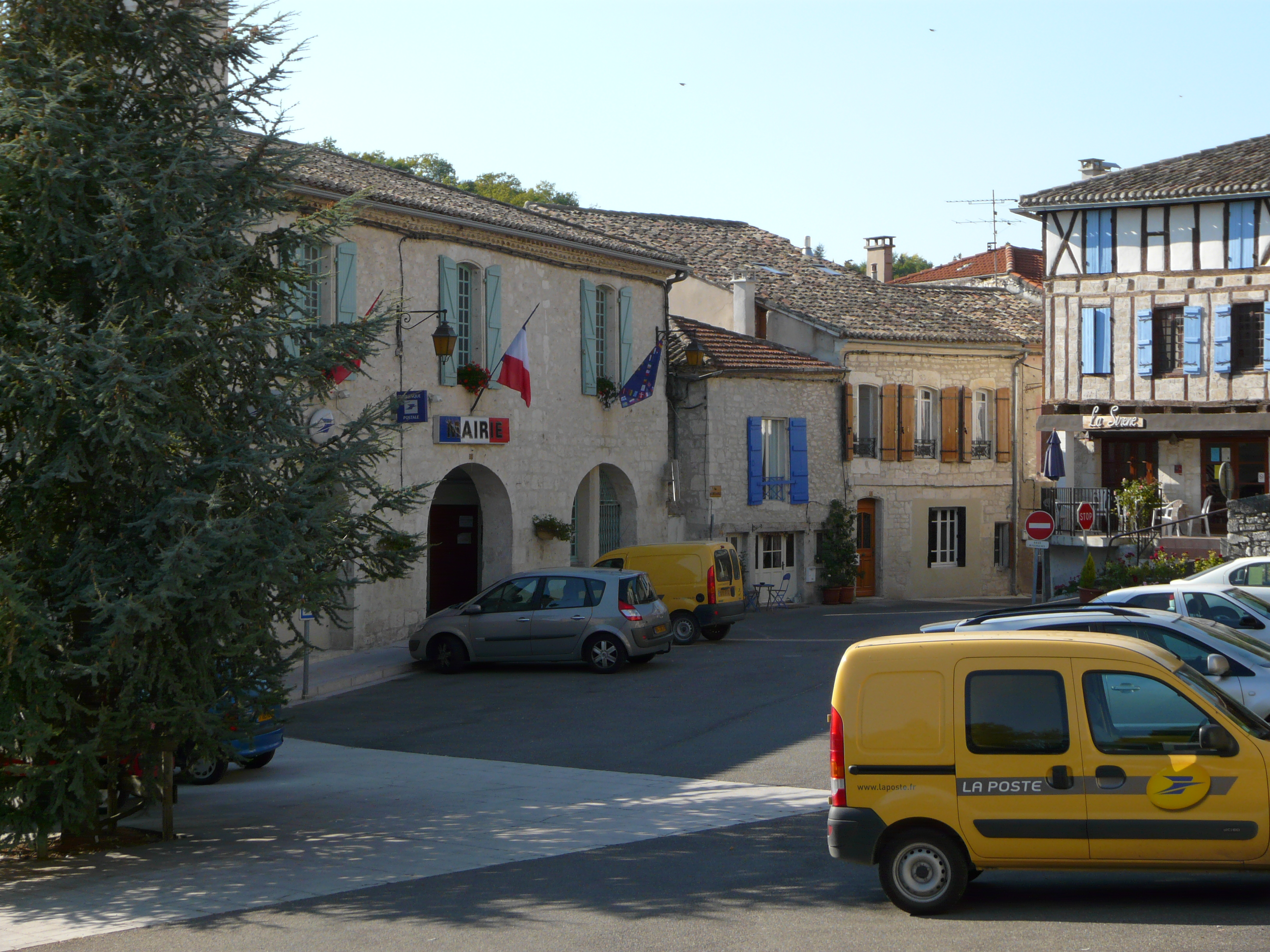
- The town hall of Montaigu-de-Quercy

- Coat of arms
- Location of Montaigu-de-Quercy
- Location within France Location within Occitanie
- Coordinates: 44°20′28″N 1°01′08″E
- Country: France
- Region: Occitania
- Department: Tarn-et-Garonne
- Arrondissement: Castelsarrasin
- Canton: Pays de Serres Sud-Quercy

Government
  - Mayor (2020–2026): Robert Alazard
- Area^{1}: 76.44 km^{2} (29.51 sq mi)
- Elevation: 250 m (820 ft)
- Highest elevation: 295 m (968 ft)
- Lowest elevation: 131 m (430 ft)
- Population (2023): 1,294
  - Density: 16.93/km^{2} (43.84/sq mi)
- Time zone: UTC+01:00 (CET)
  - Summer (DST): UTC+02:00 (CEST)
- INSEE/Postal code: 82117 /82150
- ^{1} French Land Register data, which excludes lakes, ponds, glaciers > 1 km^{2} (0.386 sq mi or 247 acres) and river estuaries.

Montaigu-de-Quercy (French pronunciation: [mɔ̃tɛɡy də kɛʁsi]; Occitan: Montagut de Carcin) is a commune in the Tarn-et-Garonne department in the Occitanie region in southern France.

== Bournac ==
Former French commune in Agenais reunited in 1828 with the commune of Montaigu-de-Quercy (formerly known as Montagut d'Agenés in occitan).
