= Valeilles =

- Commune
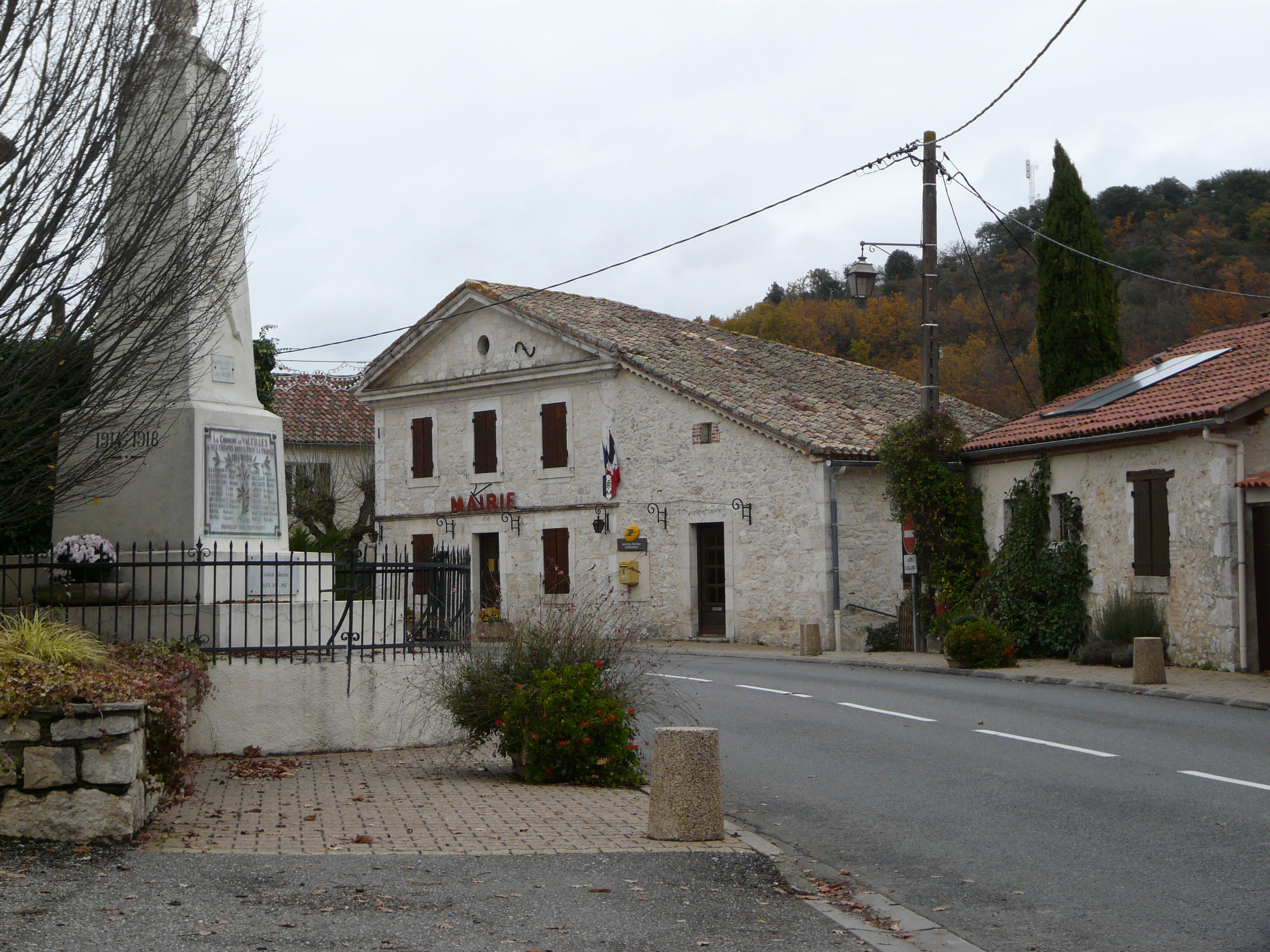
- The town hall of Valeilles
- Location of Valeilles
- Location within France Location within Occitanie
- Coordinates: 44°21′51″N 0°55′24″E
- Country: France
- Region: Occitania
- Department: Tarn-et-Garonne
- Arrondissement: Castelsarrasin
- Canton: Pays de Serres Sud-Quercy
- Intercommunality: Pays de Serres en Quercy

Government
  - Mayor (2020–2026): Michel Rouquier
- Area^{1}: 13.75 km^{2} (5.31 sq mi)
- Elevation: 110 m (360 ft)
- Highest elevation: 247 m (810 ft)
- Lowest elevation: 85 m (279 ft)
- Population (2023): 242
  - Density: 17.6/km^{2} (45.6/sq mi)
- Time zone: UTC+01:00 (CET)
  - Summer (DST): UTC+02:00 (CEST)
- INSEE/Postal code: 82185 /82150
- ^{1} French Land Register data, which excludes lakes, ponds, glaciers > 1 km^{2} (0.386 sq mi or 247 acres) and river estuaries.

Valeilles (French pronunciation: [valɛj]; Occitan: Valelhas) is a commune in the Tarn-et-Garonne department in the Occitanie region in southern France.

== See also ==
- Communes of the Tarn-et-Garonne department
