= Château de Luzech =

Ruined castle in Occitania, France

Coordinates: 44°28′45″N 1°17′16″E

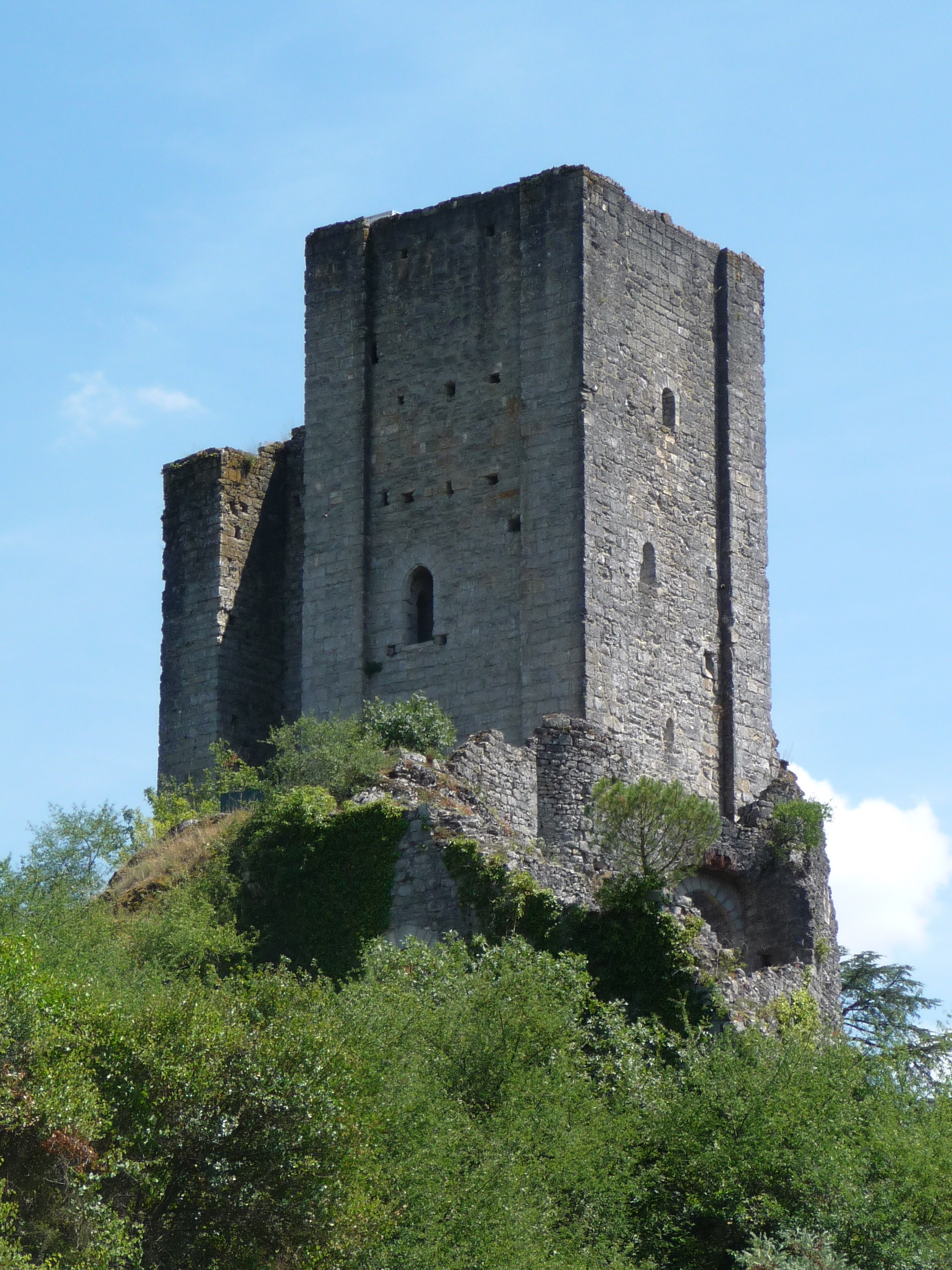
Tower of the old Luzech castle

The Château de Luzech (also known as the Tour de Luzech) is a ruined castle in the commune of Luzech in the Lot département of France.

The castle dates from the 13th century.

The castle is the property of the commune. It has been listed since 1905 as a monument historique by the French Ministry of Culture.

== See also ==
- List of castles in France
