= Lascabanes =

- Part of Lendou-en-Quercy
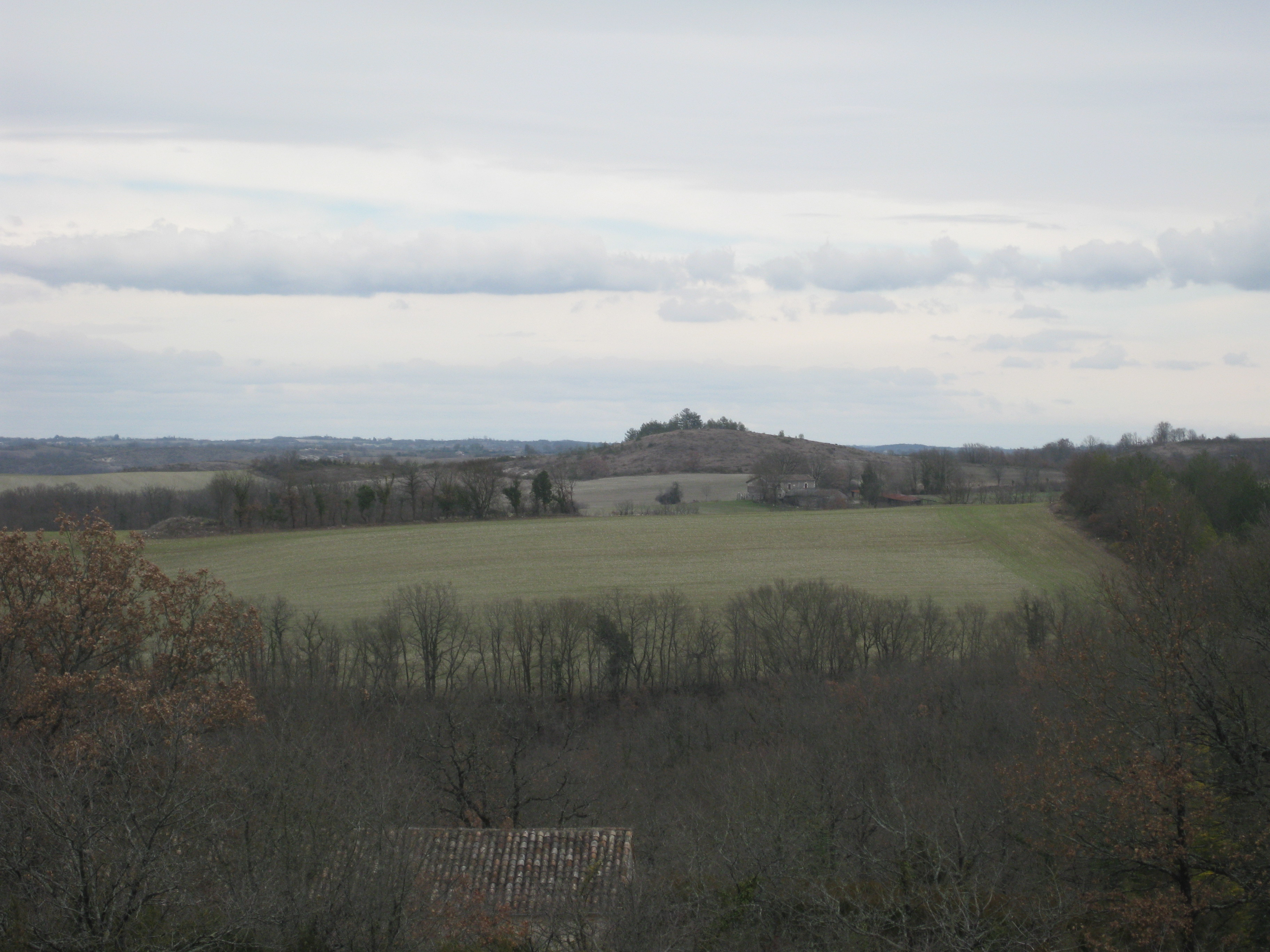
- The Tuque de Robert
- Location of Lascabanes
- Location within France Location within Occitanie
- Coordinates: 44°20′25″N 1°18′29″E
- Country: France
- Region: Occitania
- Department: Lot
- Arrondissement: Cahors
- Canton: Luzech
- Commune: Lendou-en-Quercy
- Area^{1}: 16.58 km^{2} (6.40 sq mi)
- Highest elevation: 298 m (978 ft)
- Lowest elevation: 162 m (531 ft)
- Population (2022): 205
  - Density: 12.4/km^{2} (32.0/sq mi)
- Time zone: UTC+01:00 (CET)
  - Summer (DST): UTC+02:00 (CEST)
- Postal code: 46800
- ^{1} French Land Register data, which excludes lakes, ponds, glaciers > 1 km^{2} (0.386 sq mi or 247 acres) and river estuaries.

Lascabanes (French pronunciation: [laskaban]; Languedocien: Las Cabanas) is a former commune in the Lot department in south-western France. On 1 January 2018, it was merged into the new commune of Lendou-en-Quercy.

== Geography ==
The village is partly located at the beginning of the Lendou valley and on a limestone plateau. It is crossed by the GR 65 which goes to Santiago de Compostela from Le Puy-en-Velay.

== Administration ==
List of mayors since 1802 :

- 1802-1808: Jean Lagineste
- 1809-1817: François Jacques Barayre
- 1817-1818: François Taillade
- 1818-1834: François Jacques Barayre
- 1834-1838: Antoine Combeles
- 1839-1852: Jean Barayre
- 1852-1860: Jean-Pierre Baffallie
- 1860-1865: Etienne Raynal
- 1865-1870: Bernard Autefage
- 1870-1871: Jean Vignals
- 1871-1876: Bernard Autefage
- 1876-1878: Antoine Lamouroux
- 1878-1890: Jean-Baptiste Denegre
- 1891-1892: Jean Vignals
- 1892-1902: Jean-Baptiste Denegre
- 1902-1907: Raymond Clary
- 1907-1919: Jean Alis
- 1919-1959: Henri Autefage
- 1959-1971: Georges Garrigues
- 1971-1989: Maurice Borredon
- 1989-1996: Christian Proust
- 1996-2001: Jean Fourniols
- 2001-2008: Marc Espitalié
- 2008-2017: Bernard Vignals

== See also ==
- Communes of the Lot department
