= Saint-Laurent-Lolmie =

- Part of Lendou-en-Quercy
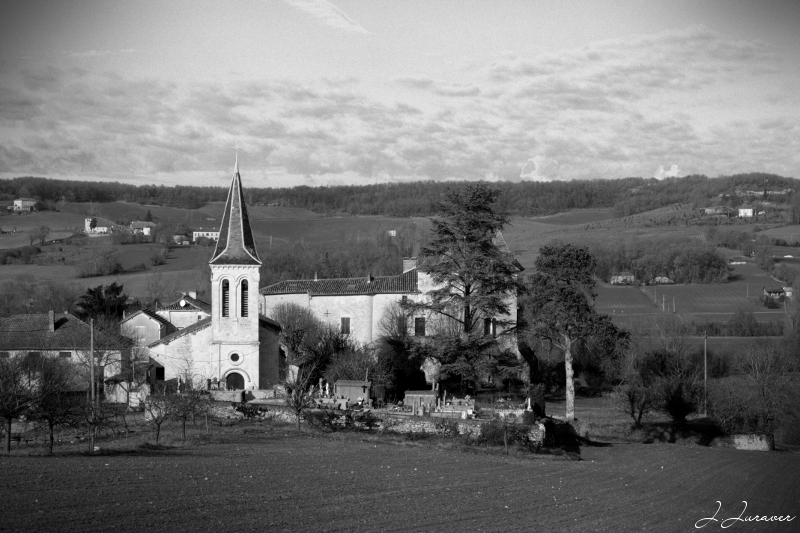
- The church, cemetery and castle of Lolmie
- Location of Saint-Laurent-Lolmie
- Location within France Location within Occitanie
- Coordinates: 44°17′35″N 1°13′45″E
- Country: France
- Region: Occitania
- Department: Lot
- Arrondissement: Cahors
- Canton: Luzech
- Commune: Lendou-en-Quercy
- Area^{1}: 10.81 km^{2} (4.17 sq mi)
- Elevation: 214 m (702 ft)
- Highest elevation: 270 m (890 ft)
- Lowest elevation: 127 m (417 ft)
- Population (2022): 174
  - Density: 16.1/km^{2} (41.7/sq mi)
- Time zone: UTC+01:00 (CET)
  - Summer (DST): UTC+02:00 (CEST)
- Postal code: 46800
- ^{1} French Land Register data, which excludes lakes, ponds, glaciers > 1 km^{2} (0.386 sq mi or 247 acres) and river estuaries.

Saint-Laurent-Lolmie (French pronunciation: [sɛ̃ loʁɑ̃ lɔlmi]; Languedocien: Sent Laurenç de l'Òrmia) is a former commune in the Lot department in south-western France. On 1 January 2018, it was merged into the new commune of Lendou-en-Quercy. Its population was 174 in 2022.

Originally known simply as Saint-Laurent, the commune was renamed Saint-Laurent-Lolmie by a decree dated December 25, 1918.

== Geography ==
Saint-Laurent and Lolmie are two different places a mile apart, and linked by the Lendou valley.

== See also ==
- Communes of the Lot department
