= Saint-Daunès =

- Part of Barguelonne-en-Quercy
- Coat of arms
- Location of Saint-Daunès
- Location within France Location within Occitanie
- Coordinates: 44°21′28″N 1°13′51″E
- Country: France
- Region: Occitania
- Department: Lot
- Arrondissement: Cahors
- Canton: Luzech
- Commune: Barguelonne-en-Quercy
- Area^{1}: 10.11 km^{2} (3.90 sq mi)
- Elevation: 238 m (781 ft)
- Highest elevation: 284 m (932 ft)
- Lowest elevation: 156 m (512 ft)
- Population (2022): 227
  - Density: 22.5/km^{2} (58.2/sq mi)
- Time zone: UTC+01:00 (CET)
  - Summer (DST): UTC+02:00 (CEST)
- Postal code: 46800
- ^{1} French Land Register data, which excludes lakes, ponds, glaciers > 1 km^{2} (0.386 sq mi or 247 acres) and river estuaries.

Saint-Daunès (French pronunciation: [sɛ̃ donɛs]; Languedocien: Sent Daunès) is a former commune in the Lot department in south-western France. On 1 January 2019, it was merged into the new commune Barguelonne-en-Quercy.

== Geography ==
The Barguelonnette flows southwestward through the commune and crosses the village.

== See also ==
- Communes of the Lot department
