= Gérard Bessière =

French diarist (1928–2024)

- Born: 27 January 1928; Luzech, France
- Died: 8 December 2024 (aged 96)
- Education: Institut Catholique de Paris
- Occupation(s): Priest, writer, journalist

Gérard Bessière (French: [ʒeʁaʁ bɛsjɛʁ]; 27 January 1928 – 8 December 2024) was a French diarist, poet, priest of the Diocese of Cahors, onetime national chaplain for the teaching staff of university parish, journalist of the weekly magazine La Vie, and author of numerous books on spirituality. He retired to a village in Lot.

== Life and career ==
Bessière was born in Luzech, Lot, in south-western France. His studies took place at the seminaries in Gourdon, in Cahors and the Institut Catholique de Paris. After studying theology, philosophy, exegesis and Biblical languages, he obtained a Philosophy Degree at the Sorbonne University, and was occupied for a long time with clergy training in the department of Lot. He collaborated with the publishing house Éditions du Cerf, for which he created the collection Jésus depuis Jésus. Together with Hyacinthe Vulliez he founded the magazine Notre Histoire. He made headlines in 2009 by excommunicating the pope.

Bessière was particularly interested in research on Jesus; he published several works at Éditions du Cerf, including Jésus est devant, Jésus insaisissable, Dieu est bien jeune, Le feu qui rafraîchit; and a richly illustrated monograph Jésus : Le dieu inattendu, published in the collection "Découvertes Gallimard".

Bessière died on 8 December 2024, at the age of 96.

== Selected publications ==
- Where is the Pope?, 1974
- Jesus Ahead, Burns and Oates, 1977
- Alors Jésus s'assit et dit…, collection « Contes du Ciel et de la Terre ». Gallimard Jeunesse, 1993
  - Jesus Sat Down and Said…, Creative Education, 1997
- Jésus : Le dieu inattendu, collection « Découvertes Gallimard » (nº 170), série Religions. Éditions Gallimard, 1993.
- With Francesco Chiovaro, Urbi et Orbi : Deux mille ans de papauté, collection « Découvertes Gallimard » (nº 269), série Religions. Éditions Gallimard, 1995.
- With Hyacinthe Vulliez, Frère François : Le saint d'Assise, collection « Découvertes Gallimard » (nº 354), série Religions. Éditions Gallimard, 1998.
- " L'Enfant hérétique ", 2004. Edition Albin Michel.
- " Jésus est à tout le monde " 2009. Edition Les Amis de Crespiat.
