= Saint-Pantaléon, Lot =

Saint-Pantaléon
- Part of Barguelonne-en-Quercy
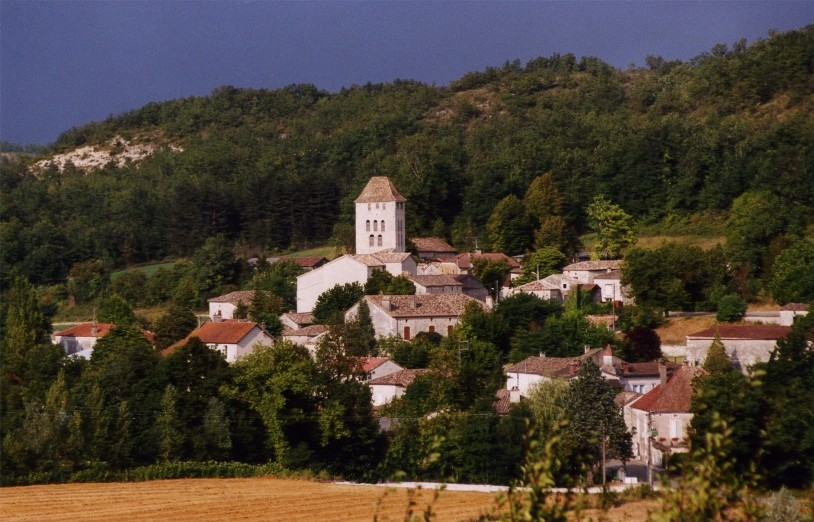
- A general view of Saint-Pantaléon
- Location of Saint-Pantaléon
- Location within France Location within Occitanie
- Coordinates: 44°22′09″N 1°16′00″E
- Country: France
- Region: Occitania
- Department: Lot
- Arrondissement: Cahors
- Canton: Luzech
- Commune: Barguelonne-en-Quercy
- Area^{1}: 19.37 km^{2} (7.48 sq mi)
- Elevation: 193 m (633 ft)
- Highest elevation: 305 m (1,001 ft)
- Lowest elevation: 175 m (574 ft)
- Population (2022): 285
  - Density: 14.7/km^{2} (38.1/sq mi)
- Time zone: UTC+01:00 (CET)
  - Summer (DST): UTC+02:00 (CEST)
- Postal code: 46800
- ^{1} French Land Register data, which excludes lakes, ponds, glaciers > 1 km^{2} (0.386 sq mi or 247 acres) and river estuaries.

Saint-Pantaléon (French pronunciation: [sɛ̃ pɑ̃taleɔ̃]; Languedocien: Sent Pantaleon) is a former commune in the Lot department in south-western France. On 1 January 2019, it was merged into the new commune Barguelonne-en-Quercy.

== Geography ==
The village lies in the valley of the ruisseau de Fraysse, a tributary of the Barguelonnette, which flows southwestward through the commune.

== See also ==
- Communes of the Lot department
