= Nino Ferrer =

Italian-French singer, recording artist, songwriter

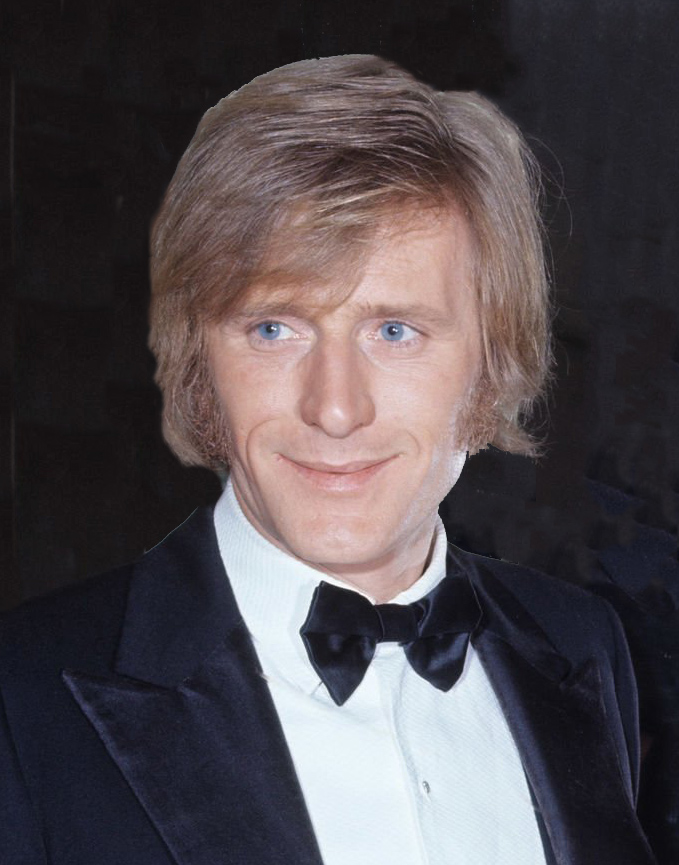
- Ferrer in 1970

Background information
- Born: Nino Agostino Arturo Maria Ferrari; 15 August 1934; Genoa, Liguria, Kingdom of Italy
- Died: 13 August 1998 (aged 63) Saint-Cyprien, Lot, France
- Genres: Pop; rock; jazz; R&B; soul
- Occupations: Singer-songwriter; author
- Instruments: Vocals; guitar; keyboards
- Years active: 1959–1998
- Labels: Riviera; CBS; WEA; Vogue; Fnac Music; Barclay
- Website: www.nino-ferrer.com

Nino Agostino Arturo Maria Ferrari (Italian: [ˈniːno aɡoˈstiːno arˈtuːro maˈriːa ferˈraːri]; 15 August 1934 – 13 August 1998), known as Nino Ferrer (Italian: [ˈniːno ferˈrɛr]), was an Italian-born French singer-songwriter and author.

== Biography and career ==
Nino Ferrer was born on 15 August 1934 in Genoa, Italy, but lived the first years of his life in New Caledonia (an overseas territory of France in the southwest Pacific Ocean), where his father, an engineer, was working. Jesuit religious schooling, first in Genoa and later in Saint-Jean de Passy, Paris, left him with a lifelong aversion to the Church. From 1947, the young Nino studied ethnology and archaeology in the Sorbonne university in Paris, also pursuing his interests in music and painting.

After completing his studies, Ferrer started traveling the world, working on a freighter ship. When he returned to France he immersed himself in music. A passion for jazz and the blues led him to worship the music of James Brown, Otis Redding and Ray Charles. He started to play the double bass in Bill Coleman's New Orleans Jazz Orchestra. He appeared on a recording for the first time in 1959, playing bass on two 45 singles by the Dixie Cats. The suggestion to take up solo singing came from the rhythm 'n' blues singer Nancy Holloway, whom he also accompanied.

In 1963, Ferrer recorded his own first record, the single "Pour oublier qu'on s'est aimé" ("To forget we were in love"). The B-side of that single had a song "C'est irréparable", which was translated for Italian superstar Mina as "Un anno d'amore" and became a big hit in 1965. Later again, in 1991, Spanish singer Luz Casal had a hit with "Un año de amor", translated from Italian by director Pedro Almodóvar for his film Tacones Lejanos (High Heels).

His first solo success came in 1965 with the song "Mirza". Other hits, such as "Cornichons" and "Oh! hé! hein! bon!" followed, establishing Ferrer as something of a comedic singer. The stereotyping and his eventual huge success made him feel "trapped", and unable to escape from the constant demands of huge audiences to hear the hits he himself despised. He started leading a life of "wine, women and song" while giving endless provocative performances in theatres, on television and on tour.

In Italy, he scored a major hit in 1967 with "La pelle nera" (the French version is "Je voudrais être un noir" ["I'd like to be a black man"]). This soul song, with its quasi-revolutionary lyrics imploring a series of Ferrer's black music idols to gift him their black skin for the benefit of music-making, achieved long-lasting iconic status in Italy.

"La pelle nera" was followed by a string of other semi-serious Italian songs, which included two appearances at the Sanremo Music Festival (in 1968 and 1970). In 1970, he returned to France and resumed his musical career there. Ferrer rebelled against the "gaudy frivolity" of French show business, filled with what he perceived as its "cynical technocrats and greedy exploiters of talent" (he had considered leaving show business altogether in 1967, when he left France for Italy). In his lesser-known songs, which the public largely ignored, he mocked life's absurdities. He agreed with Serge Gainsbourg and Claude Nougaro that songs are a "minor art" and "just background noise".

In 1975 he started breeding horses in Quercy, France. In 1989, Ferrer obtained French citizenship, which he explained as his "celebration of the bicentenary of the French Revolution." He went on to record the French national anthem, accompanied by a choir.

A couple of months after his mother died, Ferrer, on 13 August 1998, two days before his 64th birthday, took his hunting gun and walked to a field of corn, recently cut, near the neighbouring village of Saint-Cyprien. There, he laid down in a grove nearby and shot himself in the chest. His wife Kinou, with whom he had two sons, had already alerted the gendarmerie after finding a farewell letter in the house. Next day, there were front-page headlines in most French and Italian newspapers, such as "Adieu Nino!," "Nino Ferrer Hung Up His Telephone," "Our Nino Has Left for the South." They called him the Don Quixote and the Corto Maltese of French show business.

== Discography ==
=== Studio albums ===
- 1966: Enregistrement public
- 1967: Nino Ferrer
- 1969: Nino Ferrer
- 1972: Métronomie
- 1972: Nino Ferrer and Leggs
- 1974: Nino and Radiah
- 1975: Suite en œuf
- 1977: Véritables variétés verdâtres
- 1979: Blanat
- 1981: La carmencita
- 1982: Ex-libris
- 1983: Rock'n'roll cow-boy
- 1986: 13e album
- 1993: La désabusion
- 1993: La vie chez les automobiles

=== Live albums ===
- 1970: Rats and Rolls
- 1995: Concert chez Harry

=== 45RPM singles and 4-track EPs ===
- 1963 Pour oublier qu'on s'est aimé; Souviens-toi / C'est irréparable; 5 bougies bleues
- 1964 Ferme la porte; Je reviendrai / Oh ! Ne t'en va pas; Ce que tu as fait de moi (Nino Ferrer et les Jubilées)
- 1964 Les Dolly Brothers (Nino sings on Hello, Dolly! Though he isn't credited.
- 1965 Viens je t'attends; Au bout de mes vingt ans / Jennifer James; Tchouk-ou-tchouk
- 1966 Mirza; Les cornichons / Il me faudra… Natacha; Ma vie pour rien
- 1966 Le monkiss de la police; Monkiss est arrivé / Avec toi j'ai compris le monkiss; Y'a que toi monkiss (Nino Ferrer et les Gottamou)
- 1966 Alexandre; Oh ! hé ! hein ! bon ! / Le blues des rues désertes; Longtemps après
- 1966 Je veux être noir; Si tu m'aimes encore / La bande à Ferrer (parts 1 & 2)
- 1967 La pelle nera; Se mi vuoi sempre bene
- 1967 Le téléfon; Je cherche une petite fille / Madame Robert; Le millionnaire
- 1967 Mao et Moa; Je vous dis bonne chance / Mon copain Bismarck; N-F in trouble
- 1968 Le roi d'Angleterre; Il me faudra… Natacha / Les petites jeunes filles de bonne famille; Monsieur Machin
- 1968 Mamadou Mémé; Œrythia / Les yeux de Laurence; Non ti capisco più
- 1969 Je vends des robes; La rua Madureira / Tchouk-ou-tchouk; Le show-boat de nos amours
- 1969 Agata; Un premier jour sans toi / Justine; Les hommes à tout faire
- 1970 Oui mais ta mère n'est pas d'accord / Le blues anti-bourgeois
- 1970 Viens tous les soirs / L'amour, la mort, les enterrements
- 1971 Les Enfants de la patrie / La Maison près de la fontaine
- 1975 Le Sud / The garden (CBS) - appears only on post-1982 re-releases of the album Nino and Radiah - his biggest hit, reaching number 1 in March 1975
- 1975 Alcina de Jesus / Les morceaux de fer (CBS)
- 1976 Chanson pour Nathalie / Moon (CBS)
- 1978 Joseph Joseph / L'Inexpressible (CBS)
- 1981 Pour oublier qu'on s'est aimé / Michael et Jane (WEA)
- 1982 Semiramis / Micky Micky (WEA)
- 1983 Il pleut bergère / Blues des chiens (WEA)
- 1986 L'arche de Noé : Création; Chita Chita / L'arche de Noé
- 1989 La Marseillaise / Il pleut bergère (Barclay) - (the second track was recorded with the townsfolk of his home village)

=== Revival ===
- 2015 Le Sud
- 2019 La rua Madureira (credited to Bon Entendeur vs Nino Ferrer)

== Bibliography ==
- Christophe Conte and Joseph Ghosn, Nino Ferrer. Du Noir au Sud., Editions no. 1, 2005.
- Frank Maubert, La mélancolie de Nino, Éditions Scali, 2006.
- Henry Chartier, Nino Ferrer: c'est irréparable, Éditions Le Bord de l'eau, 2007.
