= Parnac =

Parnac may refer to the following places in France:

- Parnac, Indre, a commune in the Indre department
- Parnac, Lot, a commune in the Lot department
