= Bagat-en-Quercy =

- Part of Barguelonne-en-Quercy
- Location of Bagat-en-Quercy
- Location within France Location within Occitanie
- Coordinates: 44°22′17″N 1°14′29″E
- Country: France
- Region: Occitania
- Department: Lot
- Arrondissement: Cahors
- Canton: Luzech
- Commune: Barguelonne-en-Quercy
- Area^{1}: 16.63 km^{2} (6.42 sq mi)
- Elevation: 265 m (869 ft)
- Highest elevation: 302 m (991 ft)
- Lowest elevation: 173 m (568 ft)
- Population (2023): 194
  - Density: 11.7/km^{2} (30.2/sq mi)
- Time zone: UTC+01:00 (CET)
  - Summer (DST): UTC+02:00 (CEST)
- Postal code: 46800
- ^{1} French Land Register data, which excludes lakes, ponds, glaciers > 1 km^{2} (0.386 sq mi or 247 acres) and river estuaries.

Bagat-en-Quercy (French pronunciation: [baɡa ɑ̃ kɛʁsi], literally Bagat in Quercy; Languedocien: Bagat de Carcin) is a former commune in the Lot department in southwestern France. On 1 January 2019, it was merged into the new commune Barguelonne-en-Quercy.

== Geography ==
The Séoune forms parts of the commune's northern border. The small town of Montcuq is 3 km away and has a variety of shops and facilities including supermarkets, banks, petrol stations, pharmacy, doctors, restaurants, bars and a thriving Sunday market.

== See also ==
- Communes of the Lot department
