= Saint-Vincent-Rive-d'Olt =

- Commune
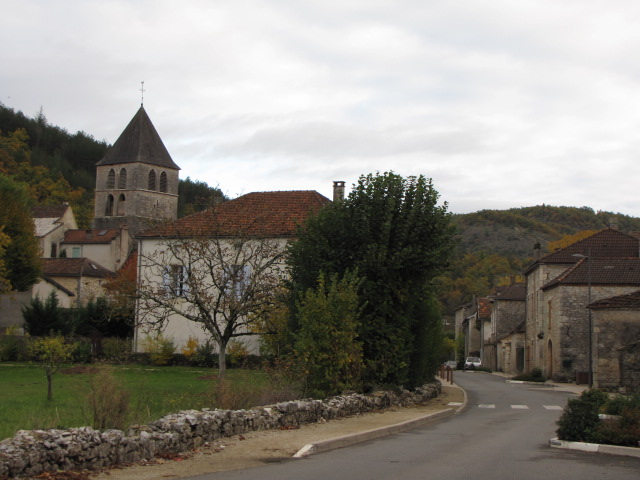
- A general view of Saint-Vincent-Rive-d'Olt
- Location of Saint-Vincent-Rive-d'Olt
- Location within France Location within Occitanie
- Coordinates: 44°27′57″N 1°18′02″E
- Country: France
- Region: Occitania
- Department: Lot
- Arrondissement: Cahors
- Canton: Luzech
- Intercommunality: Vallée du Lot et du Vignoble

Government
  - Mayor (2020–2026): Raoul Debar
- Area^{1}: 19.9 km^{2} (7.7 sq mi)
- Elevation: 150 m (490 ft)
- Highest elevation: 323 m (1,060 ft)
- Lowest elevation: 97 m (318 ft)
- Population (2023): 442
  - Density: 22.2/km^{2} (57.5/sq mi)
- Time zone: UTC+01:00 (CET)
  - Summer (DST): UTC+02:00 (CEST)
- INSEE/Postal code: 46296 /46140
- ^{1} French Land Register data, which excludes lakes, ponds, glaciers > 1 km^{2} (0.386 sq mi or 247 acres) and river estuaries.

Saint-Vincent-Rive-d'Olt is a commune in the Lot department in south-western France.

== See also ==
- Communes of the Lot department
