= Cambayrac =

- Commune
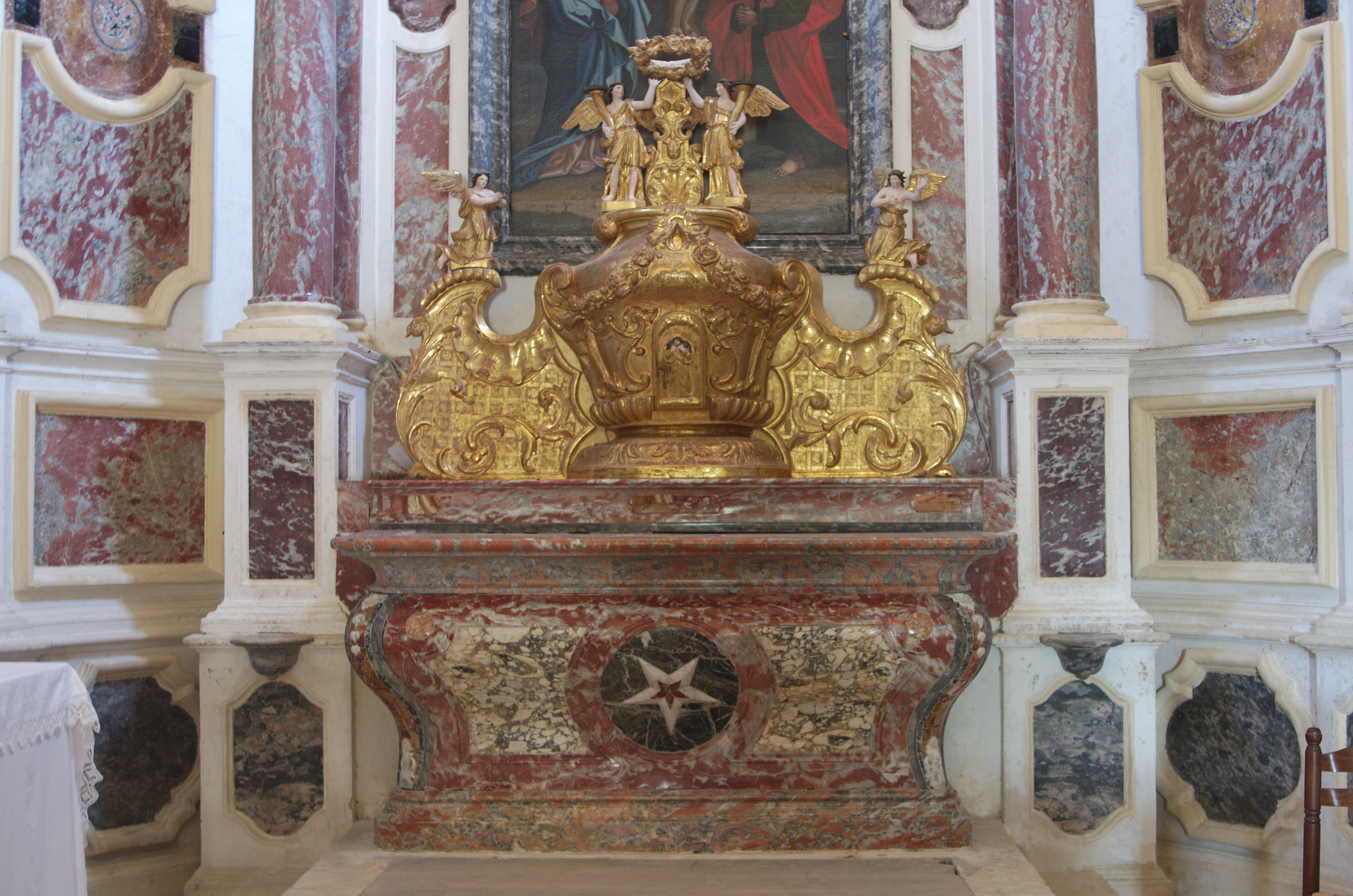
- Decoration inside the church in Cambayrac
- Location of Cambayrac
- Location within France Location within Occitanie
- Coordinates: 44°25′42″N 1°17′09″E
- Country: France
- Region: Occitania
- Department: Lot
- Arrondissement: Cahors
- Canton: Luzech
- Intercommunality: CC de la Vallée du Lot et du Vignoble

Government
  - Mayor (2020–2026): Jean-Jacques Maurès
- Area^{1}: 7.39 km^{2} (2.85 sq mi)
- Elevation: 266 m (873 ft)
- Highest elevation: 322 m (1,056 ft)
- Lowest elevation: 140 m (460 ft)
- Population (2023): 136
  - Density: 18.4/km^{2} (47.7/sq mi)
- Time zone: UTC+01:00 (CET)
  - Summer (DST): UTC+02:00 (CEST)
- INSEE/Postal code: 46050 /46140
- ^{1} French Land Register data, which excludes lakes, ponds, glaciers > 1 km^{2} (0.386 sq mi or 247 acres) and river estuaries.

Cambayrac is a commune in the Lot department in south-western France.

== See also ==
- Communes of the Lot department
