= Saint-Cyprien, Lot =

Former commune in Occitania, France

Saint-Cyprien
- Part of Lendou-en-Quercy
- Location of Saint-Cyprien
- Location within France Location within Occitanie
- Coordinates: 44°18′31″N 1°15′53″E
- Country: France
- Region: Occitania
- Department: Lot
- Arrondissement: Cahors
- Canton: Luzech
- Commune: Lendou-en-Quercy
- Area^{1}: 15.07 km^{2} (5.82 sq mi)
- Elevation: 222 m (728 ft)
- Highest elevation: 277 m (909 ft)
- Lowest elevation: 145 m (476 ft)
- Population (2022): 241
  - Density: 16.0/km^{2} (41.4/sq mi)
- Time zone: UTC+01:00 (CET)
  - Summer (DST): UTC+02:00 (CEST)
- Postal code: 46800
- ^{1} French Land Register data, which excludes lakes, ponds, glaciers > 1 km^{2} (0.386 sq mi or 247 acres) and river estuaries.

Saint-Cyprien (French pronunciation: [sɛ̃ sipʁijɛ̃]; Languedocien: Sent Çabrian) is a former commune in the Lot department in south-western France. On 1 January 2018, it was merged into the new commune of Lendou-en-Quercy.

== History ==
=== Legend of the relics of St. Cyprian ===
The village's name comes from the name of Cyprian, bishop of Carthage, whose relics are claimed to have been hidden here during two centuries before reportedly transferred to Moissac in 1122. This information comes from Aymeric de Peyrac in his Chronicle, and in an old lectionary of the abbey of Moissac, quoted by the Gallia Christiana, which says that the relics were transferred to Moissac from a place in the diocese of Cahors called Valles or Les Vaux. Alain de Solminihac probably did not believe the authenticity of the relics.

Before 1790, the parish's name was Saint-Cyprien des Vaux.

== Administration ==
List of mayors since 1793:

- Charles Bach
  - 1793-1796
- Jean Laroque
  - 1796-1799
- Jean Paul Joseph Rayet
  - 1799-1800
- Jean Laroque
  - 1800-1821
- Duc
  - 1821-1826
- Bernard Lacavalerie
    - 1826-1830
- Charles Mathieu de Tuller
  - 1830-1832
- Pierre Bousquet
  - 1832-1841
- Jean Pierre Gautié
  - 1841-1848
- Bousquet
  - 1848-1851
- Bernard Laroque
  - 1851-1852
- Antoine Sourbié
  - 1852-1862
- Gauthier J. Pierre Mercadié
  - 1862-1878
- Clément Delprat
  - 1878-1884
- Louis Verdier
  - 1884-1885
- Eugène Mercadié
  - 1885-1919
- Armand Mercadié
  - 1919-1948
- Henri Chazarin
  - 1948-1953
- Gilbert Borredon
  - 1953-1973
- Daniel Maury
  - 1973-1989
- Jean-Louis Vayssière
  - 1989-2017

== See also ==
- Communes of the Lot department
