= Bélaye =

- Commune
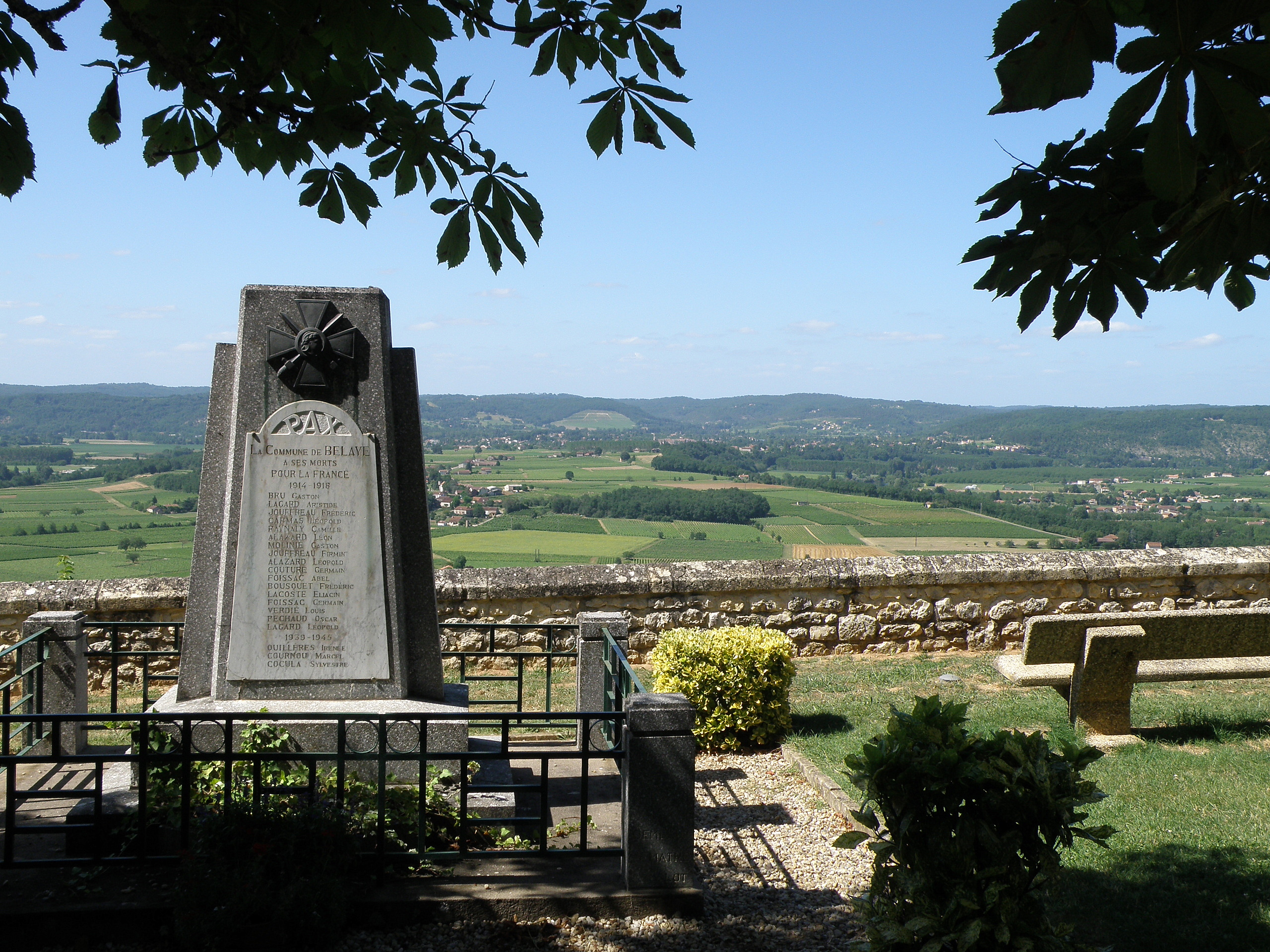
- The war memorial in Bélaye
- Location of Bélaye
- Location within France Location within Occitanie
- Coordinates: 44°27′57″N 1°11′37″E
- Country: France
- Region: Occitania
- Department: Lot
- Arrondissement: Cahors
- Canton: Luzech
- Intercommunality: Vallée du Lot et du Vignoble

Government
  - Mayor (2020–2026): Jacques Baijot
- Area^{1}: 18.69 km^{2} (7.22 sq mi)
- Elevation: 209 m (686 ft)
- Highest elevation: 274 m (899 ft)
- Lowest elevation: 80 m (260 ft)
- Population (2023): 214
  - Density: 11.4/km^{2} (29.7/sq mi)
- Time zone: UTC+01:00 (CET)
  - Summer (DST): UTC+02:00 (CEST)
- INSEE/Postal code: 46022 /46140
- ^{1} French Land Register data, which excludes lakes, ponds, glaciers > 1 km^{2} (0.386 sq mi or 247 acres) and river estuaries.

Bélaye (French pronunciation: [belaj]; Occitan: Belaiga) is a commune in the Lot department in southwestern France.

== Population ==
Historical population
Year	Pop.	±% p.a.
1968	255	—
1975	228	−1.59%
1982	204	−1.58%
1990	220	+0.95%
1999	223	+0.15%
2007	219	−0.23%
2012	223	+0.36%
2017	224	+0.09%
2023	214	−0.76%
Source: INSEE

== See also ==
- Communes of the Lot department
