= Douelle =

- Commune
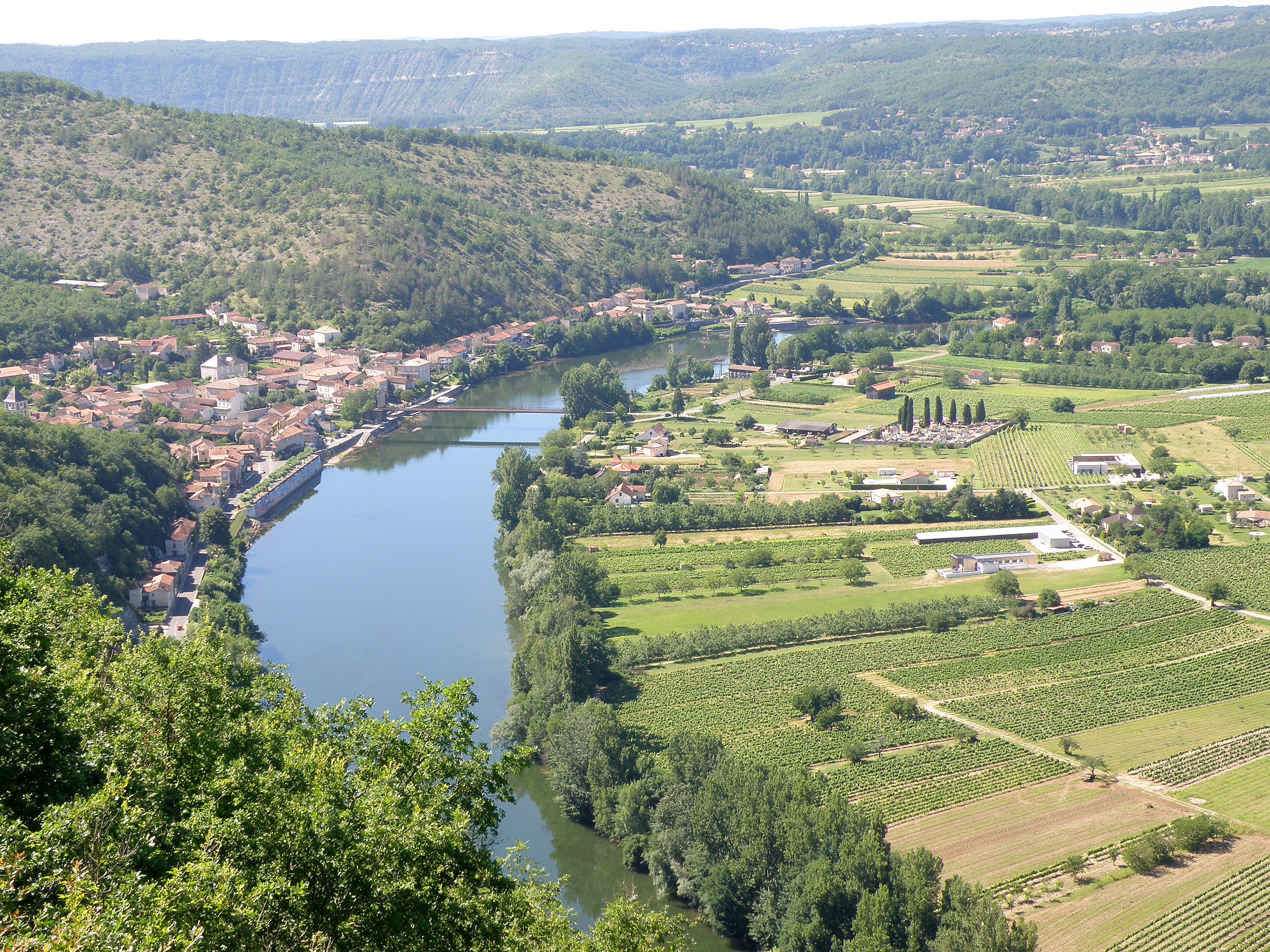
- A general view of Douelle
- Location of Douelle
- Location within France Location within Occitanie
- Coordinates: 44°28′12″N 1°21′38″E
- Country: France
- Region: Occitania
- Department: Lot
- Arrondissement: Cahors
- Canton: Luzech
- Intercommunality: CA Grand Cahors

Government
  - Mayor (2020–2026): Bénédicte Lanes
- Area^{1}: 8.77 km^{2} (3.39 sq mi)
- Elevation: 118 m (387 ft)
- Highest elevation: 310 m (1,020 ft)
- Lowest elevation: 100 m (330 ft)
- Population (2023): 830
  - Density: 95/km^{2} (250/sq mi)
- Time zone: UTC+01:00 (CET)
  - Summer (DST): UTC+02:00 (CEST)
- INSEE/Postal code: 46088 /46140
- ^{1} French Land Register data, which excludes lakes, ponds, glaciers > 1 km^{2} (0.386 sq mi or 247 acres) and river estuaries.

Douelle (French pronunciation: [dwɛl]; Occitan: Doèla) is a commune in the Lot department in south-western France.

It is a port on the left bank of the river Lot.

The village's history has been closely linked with the transport of local wine, as well as the manufacture of barrels. (The wooden stave of a barrel is named a Douelle).

== See also ==
- Communes of the Lot department
