= Albas, Lot =

Albas
- Commune
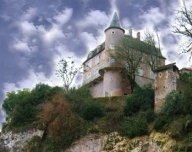
- Château de la Blainie
- Location of Albas
- Location within France Location within Occitanie
- Coordinates: 44°28′10″N 1°14′15″E
- Country: France
- Region: Occitania
- Department: Lot
- Arrondissement: Cahors
- Canton: Luzech
- Intercommunality: Vallée du Lot et du Vignoble

Government
  - Mayor (2020–2026): Jean-Pierre Alaux
- Area^{1}: 21.84 km^{2} (8.43 sq mi)
- Elevation: 107 m (351 ft)
- Highest elevation: 332 m (1,089 ft)
- Lowest elevation: 85 m (279 ft)
- Population (2023): 529
  - Density: 24.2/km^{2} (62.7/sq mi)
- Time zone: UTC+01:00 (CET)
  - Summer (DST): UTC+02:00 (CEST)
- INSEE/Postal code: 46001 /46140
- ^{1} French Land Register data, which excludes lakes, ponds, glaciers > 1 km^{2} (0.386 sq mi or 247 acres) and river estuaries.

Albas (French pronunciation: [albas]; Occitan: Albàs) is a commune in the Lot department in southwestern France.

== Population ==
Historical population
Year	Pop.	±% p.a.
1968	504	—
1975	522	+0.50%
1982	545	+0.62%
1990	507	−0.90%
1999	545	+0.81%
2007	511	−0.80%
2012	516	+0.19%
2017	525	+0.35%
2023	529	+0.13%
Source: INSEE

Inhabitants of Albas are called Albasois in French.

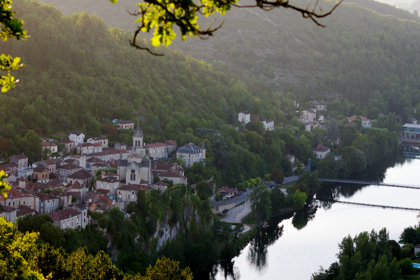

== See also ==
- Communes of the Lot department
