= Lendou-en-Quercy =

- Commune
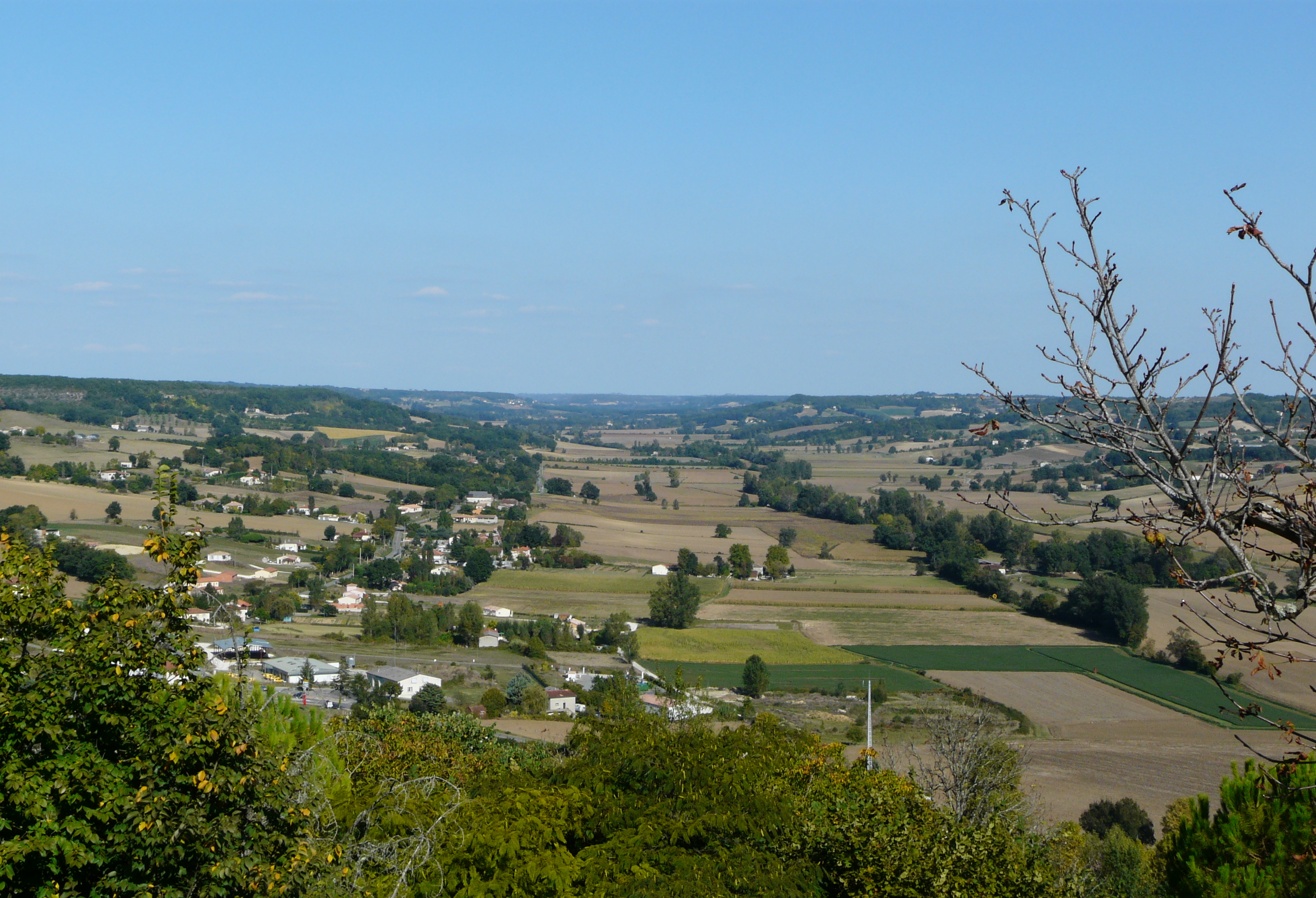
- Lendou valley
- Location of Lendou-en-Quercy
- Location within France Location within Occitanie
- Coordinates: 44°18′31″N 1°15′53″E
- Country: France
- Region: Occitania
- Department: Lot
- Arrondissement: Cahors
- Canton: Luzech
- Intercommunality: Quercy Blanc

Government
  - Mayor (2020–2026): Bernard Vignals
- Area^{1}: 42.46 km^{2} (16.39 sq mi)
- Highest elevation: 308 m (1,010 ft)
- Lowest elevation: 127 m (417 ft)
- Population (2023): 612
  - Density: 14.4/km^{2} (37.3/sq mi)
- Time zone: UTC+01:00 (CET)
  - Summer (DST): UTC+02:00 (CEST)
- INSEE/Postal code: 46262 /46800
- ^{1} French Land Register data, which excludes lakes, ponds, glaciers > 1 km^{2} (0.386 sq mi or 247 acres) and river estuaries.

Lendou-en-Quercy (French pronunciation: [lɑ̃du ɑ̃ kɛʁsi], literally Lendou in Quercy; Occitan: Lendon de Carcin) is a commune in the department of Lot, southern France. The municipality was established on 1 January 2018 by merger of the former communes of Saint-Cyprien, Saint-Laurent-Lolmie and Lascabanes.

The town hall is located in the village of Saint-Cyprien.

== Main sights ==
- Saint-Laurent church, built in the early 16th century
- The church of Lolmie, slightly modified in the 19th century

== See also ==
- Communes of the Lot department
