= Castelfranc =

- Commune
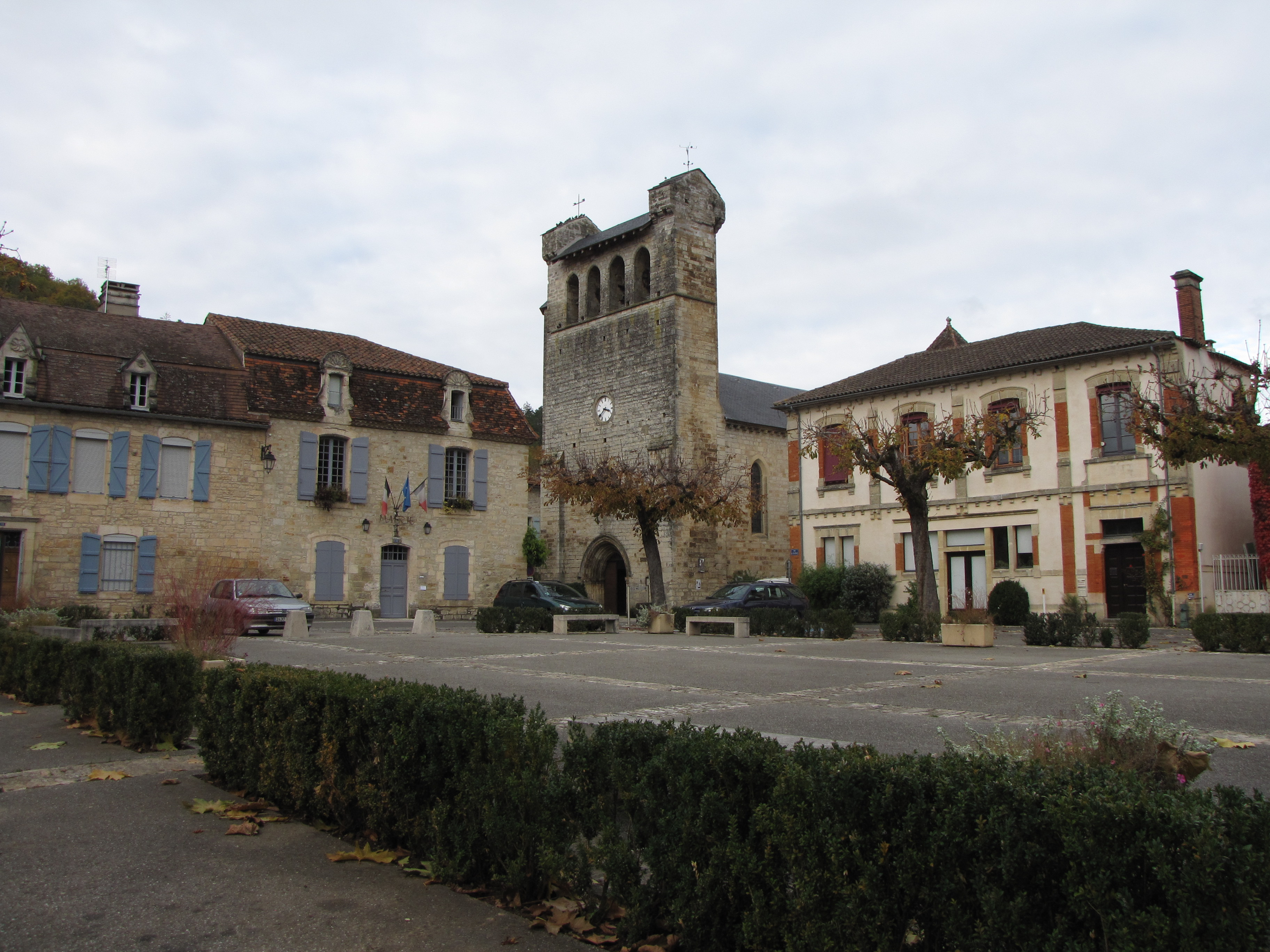
- The town hall and church in Castelfranc
- Location of Castelfranc
- Location within France Location within Occitanie
- Coordinates: 44°30′04″N 1°13′23″E
- Country: France
- Region: Occitania
- Department: Lot
- Arrondissement: Cahors
- Canton: Luzech
- Intercommunality: CC de la Vallée du Lot et du Vignoble

Government
  - Mayor (2020–2026): Laurent Bolos
- Area^{1}: 5.71 km^{2} (2.20 sq mi)
- Elevation: 110 m (360 ft)
- Highest elevation: 270 m (890 ft)
- Lowest elevation: 80 m (260 ft)
- Population (2023): 428
  - Density: 75.0/km^{2} (194/sq mi)
- Time zone: UTC+01:00 (CET)
  - Summer (DST): UTC+02:00 (CEST)
- INSEE/Postal code: 46062 /46140
- ^{1} French Land Register data, which excludes lakes, ponds, glaciers > 1 km^{2} (0.386 sq mi or 247 acres) and river estuaries.

Castelfranc (French pronunciation: [kastɛlfʁɑ̃]; Occitan: Castèlfranc) is a commune in the Lot department in south-western France.

== See also ==
- Communes of the Lot department
