= Barguelonne-en-Quercy =

- Commune
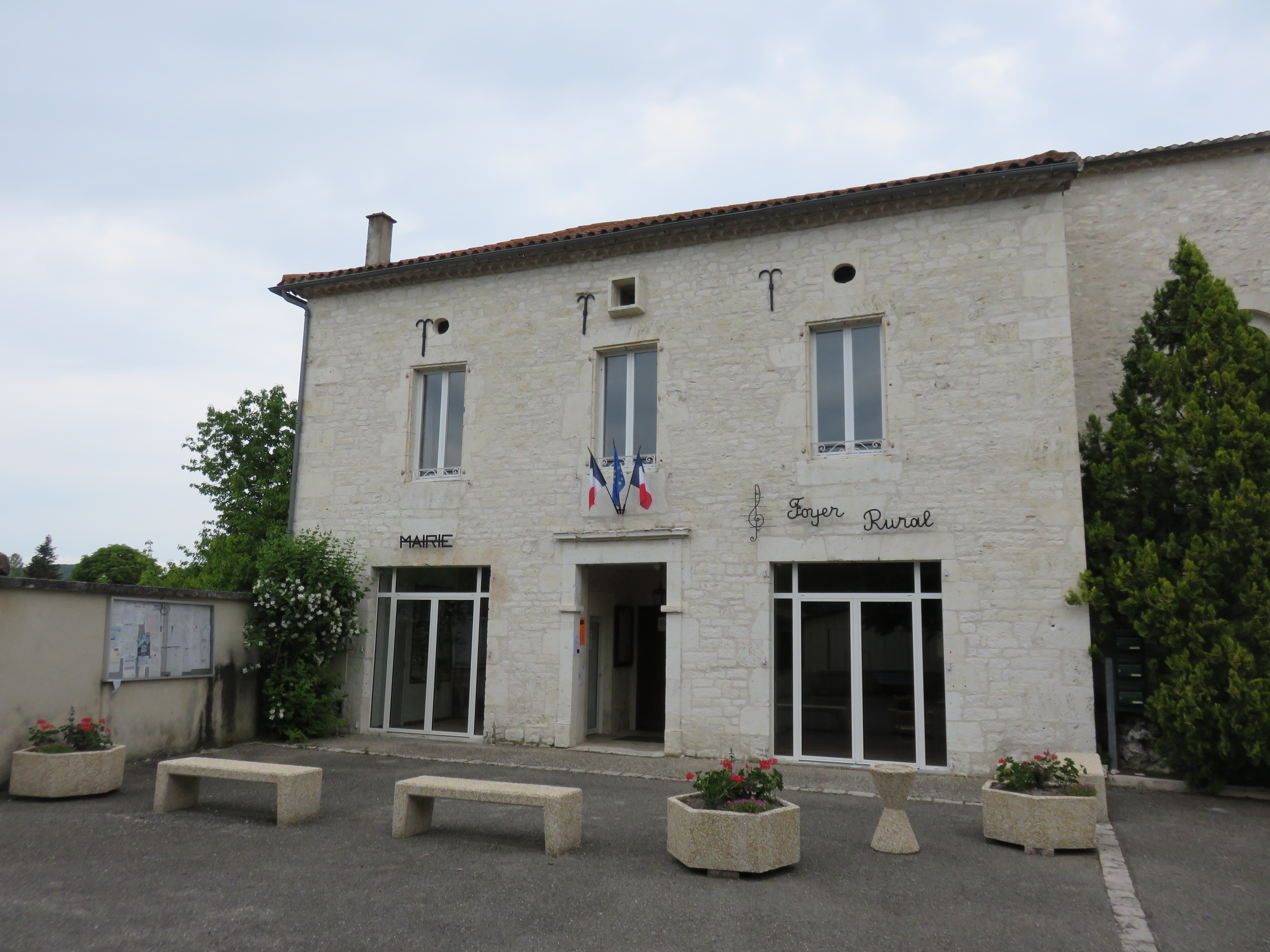
- Barguelonne-en-Quercy Town hall
- Location of Barguelonne-en-Quercy
- Location within France Location within Occitanie
- Coordinates: 44°21′28″N 1°13′51″E
- Country: France
- Region: Occitania
- Department: Lot
- Arrondissement: Cahors
- Canton: Luzech
- Intercommunality: Quercy Blanc

Government
  - Mayor (2020–2026): Christophe Canal
- Area^{1}: 46.11 km^{2} (17.80 sq mi)
- Highest elevation: 302 m (991 ft)
- Lowest elevation: 156 m (512 ft)
- Population (2023): 704
  - Density: 15.3/km^{2} (39.5/sq mi)
- Time zone: UTC+01:00 (CET)
  - Summer (DST): UTC+02:00 (CEST)
- INSEE/Postal code: 46263 /46800
- ^{1} French Land Register data, which excludes lakes, ponds, glaciers > 1 km^{2} (0.386 sq mi or 247 acres) and river estuaries.

Barguelonne-en-Quercy (French pronunciation: [baʁɡəlɔn ɑ̃ kɛʁsi], literally Barguelonne in Quercy; Occitan: Bargalona de Carcin) is a commune in the Lot department in south-western France. It was established on 1 January 2019 by merger of the former communes of Saint-Daunès (the seat), Bagat-en-Quercy and Saint-Pantaléon.

== See also ==
- Communes of the Lot department
