= Montlauzun =

- Commune
- Location of Montlauzun
- Location within France Location within Occitanie
- Coordinates: 44°17′38″N 1°11′47″E
- Country: France
- Region: Occitania
- Department: Lot
- Arrondissement: Cahors
- Canton: Luzech

Government
  - Mayor (2020–2026): Alain Lapèze
- Area^{1}: 6.48 km^{2} (2.50 sq mi)
- Elevation: 191 m (627 ft)
- Highest elevation: 250 m (820 ft)
- Lowest elevation: 128 m (420 ft)
- Population (2023): 121
  - Density: 18.7/km^{2} (48.4/sq mi)
- Time zone: UTC+01:00 (CET)
  - Summer (DST): UTC+02:00 (CEST)
- INSEE/Postal code: 46206 /46800
- ^{1} French Land Register data, which excludes lakes, ponds, glaciers > 1 km^{2} (0.386 sq mi or 247 acres) and river estuaries.

Montlauzun (French pronunciation: [mɔ̃lozœ̃]; Occitan: Montliausut) is a commune in the Lot department in south-western France.

== See also ==
- Communes of the Lot department
