= Anglars-Juillac =

- Commune
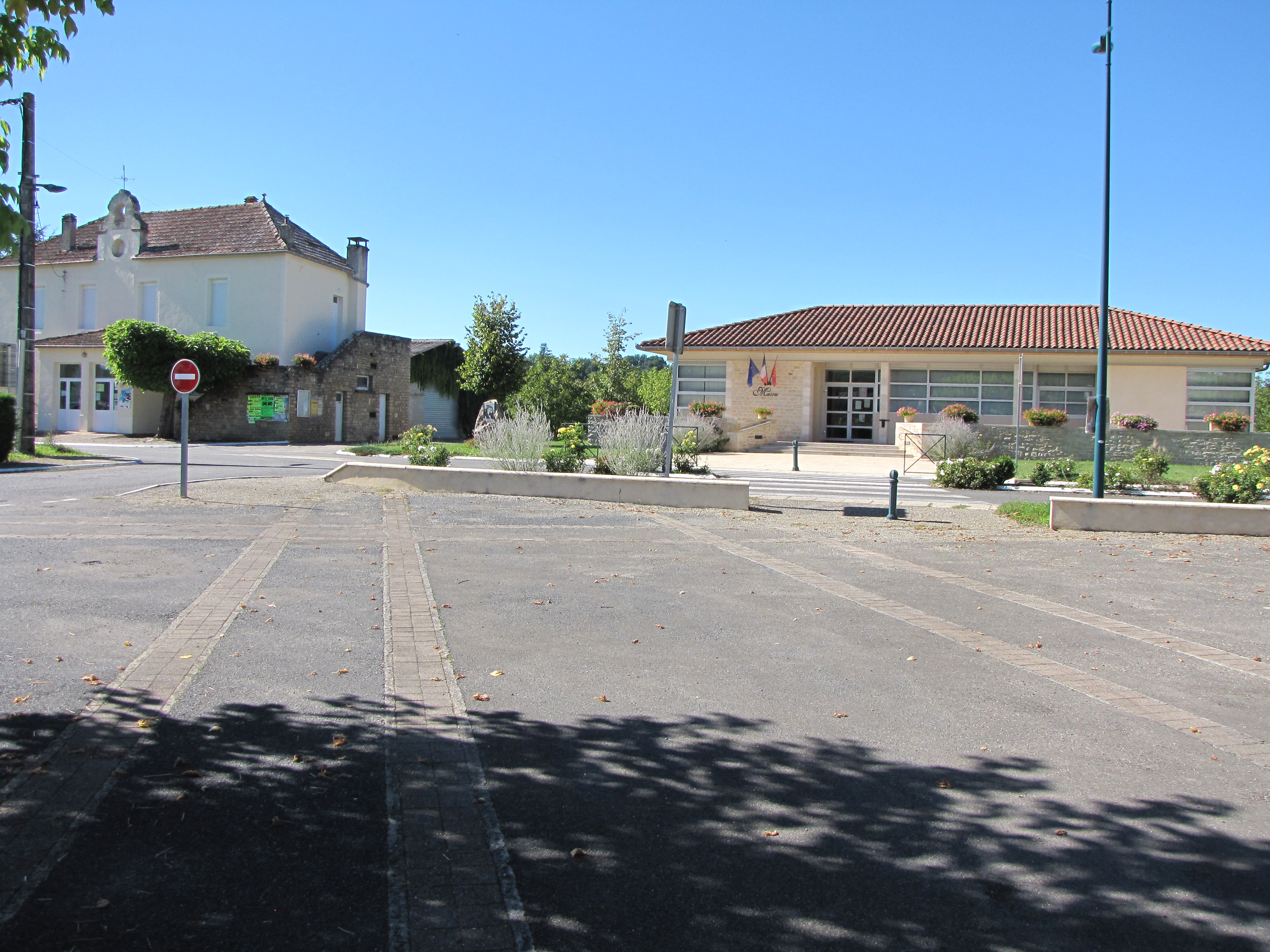
- The town hall in Anglars-Juillac
- Location of Anglars-Juillac
- Location within France Location within Occitanie
- Coordinates: 44°29′N 1°12′E
- Country: France
- Region: Occitania
- Department: Lot
- Arrondissement: Cahors
- Canton: Luzech
- Intercommunality: Vallée du Lot et du Vignoble

Government
  - Mayor (2020–2026): Francis Laffargue
- Area^{1}: 5.48 km^{2} (2.12 sq mi)
- Elevation: 98 m (322 ft)
- Highest elevation: 240 m (790 ft)
- Lowest elevation: 81 m (266 ft)
- Population (2023): 330
  - Density: 60/km^{2} (160/sq mi)
- Time zone: UTC+01:00 (CET)
  - Summer (DST): UTC+02:00 (CEST)
- INSEE/Postal code: 46005 /46140
- ^{1} French Land Register data, which excludes lakes, ponds, glaciers > 1 km^{2} (0.386 sq mi or 247 acres) and river estuaries.

Anglars-Juillac (French pronunciation: [ɑ̃ɡlaʁ ʒɥijak]; Occitan: Anglars e Julhac) is a commune in the Lot department in southwestern France.

== Population ==
Historical population
Year	Pop.	±% p.a.
1968	392	—
1975	340	−2.01%
1982	369	+1.18%
1990	329	−1.42%
1999	331	+0.07%
2007	339	+0.30%
2012	341	+0.12%
2017	326	−0.90%
2023	330	+0.20%
Source: INSEE

Inhabitants are called Anglacois in French.

== See also ==
- Communes of the Lot department
