= Parnac, Lot =

Parnac
- Commune
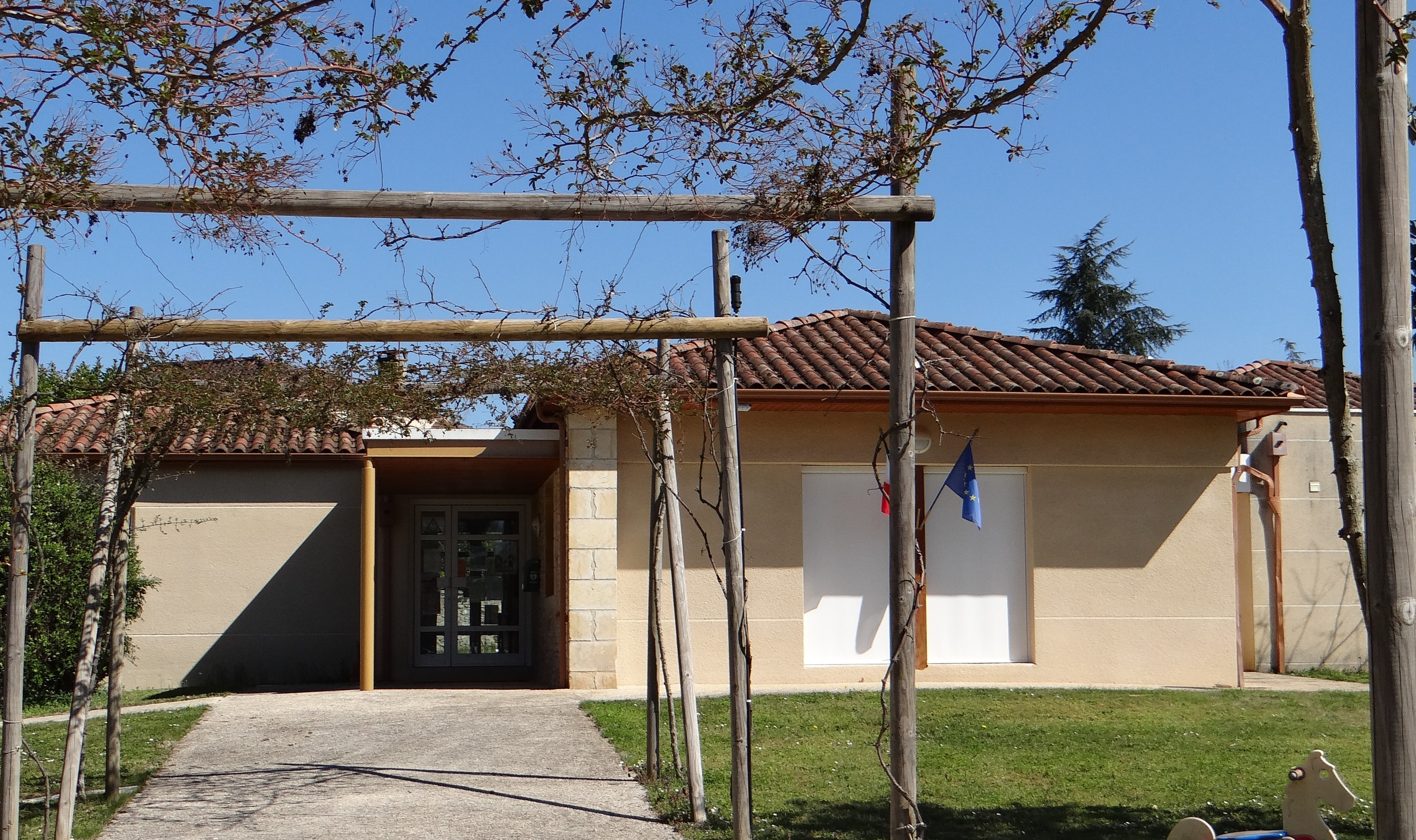
- Town hall
- Location of Parnac
- Location within France Location within Occitanie
- Coordinates: 44°29′27″N 1°18′55″E
- Country: France
- Region: Occitania
- Department: Lot
- Arrondissement: Cahors
- Canton: Luzech
- Intercommunality: CC Vallée du Lot et du Vignoble

Government
  - Mayor (2020–2026): Marc Gastal
- Area^{1}: 5.77 km^{2} (2.23 sq mi)
- Elevation: 139 m (456 ft)
- Highest elevation: 296 m (971 ft)
- Lowest elevation: 100 m (330 ft)
- Population (2023): 382
  - Density: 66.2/km^{2} (171/sq mi)
- Time zone: UTC+01:00 (CET)
  - Summer (DST): UTC+02:00 (CEST)
- INSEE/Postal code: 46214 /46140
- ^{1} French Land Register data, which excludes lakes, ponds, glaciers > 1 km^{2} (0.386 sq mi or 247 acres) and river estuaries.

Parnac (French pronunciation: [paʁnak]) is a commune in the Lot department in south-western France.

== See also ==
- Communes of the Lot department
