= Luzech =

- Commune
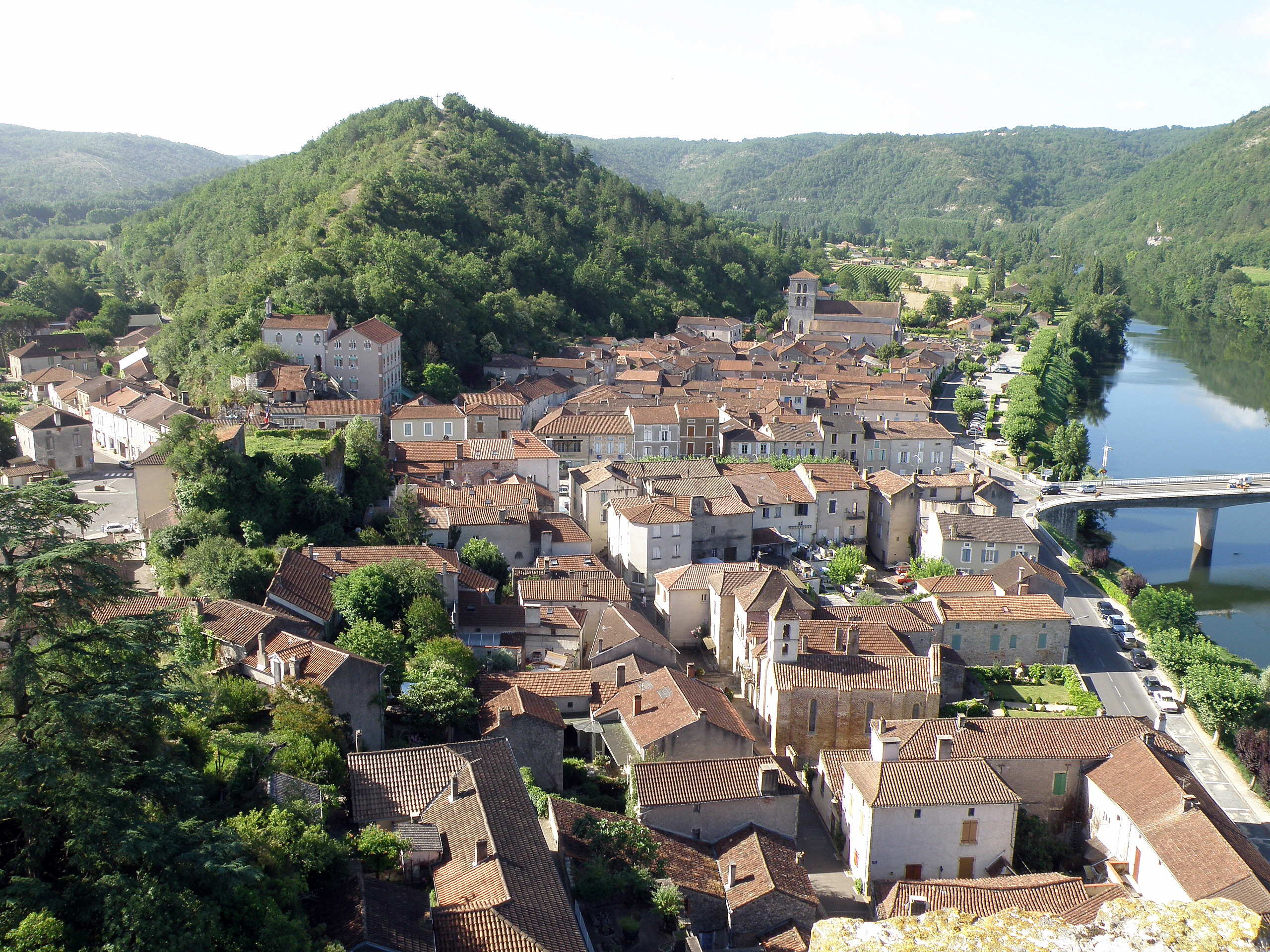
- A general view of Luzech

- Coat of arms
- Location of Luzech
- Location within France Location within Occitanie
- Coordinates: 44°28′45″N 1°17′16″E
- Country: France
- Region: Occitania
- Department: Lot
- Arrondissement: Cahors
- Canton: Luzech
- Intercommunality: CC de la Vallée du Lot et du Vignoble

Government
  - Mayor (2020–2026): Bernard Piaser
- Area^{1}: 22.13 km^{2} (8.54 sq mi)
- Elevation: 104 m (341 ft)
- Highest elevation: 323 m (1,060 ft)
- Lowest elevation: 84 m (276 ft)
- Population (2023): 1,750
  - Density: 79.1/km^{2} (205/sq mi)
- Time zone: UTC+01:00 (CET)
  - Summer (DST): UTC+02:00 (CEST)
- INSEE/Postal code: 46182 /46140
- ^{1} French Land Register data, which excludes lakes, ponds, glaciers > 1 km^{2} (0.386 sq mi or 247 acres) and river estuaries.

Luzech (French pronunciation: [lyzɛʃ] or [lyzɛk]; Languedocien: Lusèg) is a commune in the Lot department in south-western France.

== Geography ==
Luzech is a small town of around 1,750 inhabitants, located in Quercy at the heart of the vineyard of Cahors wine making region (AOC) on the ancient line Monsempron – Libos – Cahors between Fumel and Cahors. Encircled by the river Lot, Luzech is a peninsula, an inescapable stage on the circuit "Empowered by the Lot". A dam, the Barrage de Luzech was constructed in the late 1940s. Animated by very active associations, the town offers many socio-cultural and sporting activities, such as orienteering, fishing and kayaking. Luzech is situated on an isthmus formed by the Lot, 90 m wide (or 300 Roman feet), bordered to the north by the hill of the Impernal (150 m) and to the south by that of the Pistoule (70 m), so that the river bypasses a loop, called "cingle" (meander). The central square (main street) is built on the site of an old canal, created for navigation in 1840, and filled in between 1940 and 1950. It shortened the navigation on the Lot by around 5 km. As part of the navigation project of the Lot as far as Aiguillon, there is currently an impassable barrier at Luzech, but projects are underway to advance it.

== Place Names ==
The place name Luzech could be based on Gallic names such as Lucetios, Luteus or Lutos followed by -ecia 1.

== History ==
Luzech was already inhabited in prehistoric times, including the Pech de la Nène. Before the Roman conquest, the Gauls built an oppidum on the Impernal, naturally fortified by its rugged character.

Luzech was among the places in the Lot considered to possibly be the famous fortified camp of Uxellodunum. The hypothesis was defended once upon a time by Napoleon III, who finally determined the location of Puy Issolud was still defended, with some notoriety by a local scholar, Emile Albouy in 1957. However, recent excavations of the Fountain Loulié in Puy Issolud led to a scientific consensus on the issue, even if individuals still defended sites other than that of Puy d’Issolud. For this reason the visitors will use Uxellodunum street to go to the administration building and will park in the Square of Lucterius who was the heroic leader of this resistance, and whose majestic bust is located at the entrance to the Cahors library.

In the Middle Ages, the walls hemmed the town in on all sides. They were built at the foot of the castle, the oldest mention of which goes back to the same century. Several gates gave access to the town, crossed from north to south by the Main street from the Ruffier gate to the Ditch gate.

Luzech was home to one of the four baronies of Quercy. It was called the town of the barons to mark the importance of the family of De Luzech, who preserved it from the eleventh century to the early seventeenth century when it then passed onto the house of Rastignac who occupied it up the Revolution.

Taken by Richard the Lion Heart in 1188, Luzech later fell into the hands of Albigensians, but during the crusade of the early thirteenth century, the fortress was taken and burned by the Crusaders of Simon de Montfort. It was acquired later by Guillaume de Cardaillac, Bishop of Cahors, who became lord of Luzech. The barons became co-lords.

The Hundred Years' War caused havoc: most castles fell to the English, but they never considered implementing their plan to besiege Luzech.

Excavations on the hill of the Impernal helped expose remains of walls and buildings of Gallic and Roman times.

The Chapt de Rastignac family from Limousin, inherited in Quercy, property of the barons of Luzech in 1600, thanks to the marriage of Jacquette Ricard Gourdon, widow of John II of Luzech, with Jean Chapt Rastignac. This one, attached to the service of Louis XIII and then Louis XIV, avoided the village of Luzech and the uncertainties of the Fronde. In 1617, the estate of Rastignac was elevated to the status of the marquisat, and John became a brigadier. In a letter addressed to him, Louis XIII wrote: "(...) I have you always under the consideration that you deserve. I pray God, Count, to have you in His Holy Guard" They possessed Luzech until the mid-eighteenth century. Their descendant, Alfred de la Rochefoucauld, whose mother was born Zénaïde Rastignac, would sell all the family property, and yield to the town all that was left of the castle of the Barons.

== Héraldique ==

Its blazon is: Écu quartered:

first and fourth silver, with Azure Griffin, armed and langued gules, the second and third Azure, with Silver Crescent.

== List of the Mayors ==
- March 2001 | 2014 | Jean-Claude Baldy| PRG |
- March 1989 | 2001 | Henri Castagnède | PRG | Conseiller général

== Demography ==
In 2017, the municipality had 1,815 inhabitants.

== Economy ==
The river port of Luzech is managed by the Chamber of Commerce and Industry of the Lot.

== Sites and monuments ==
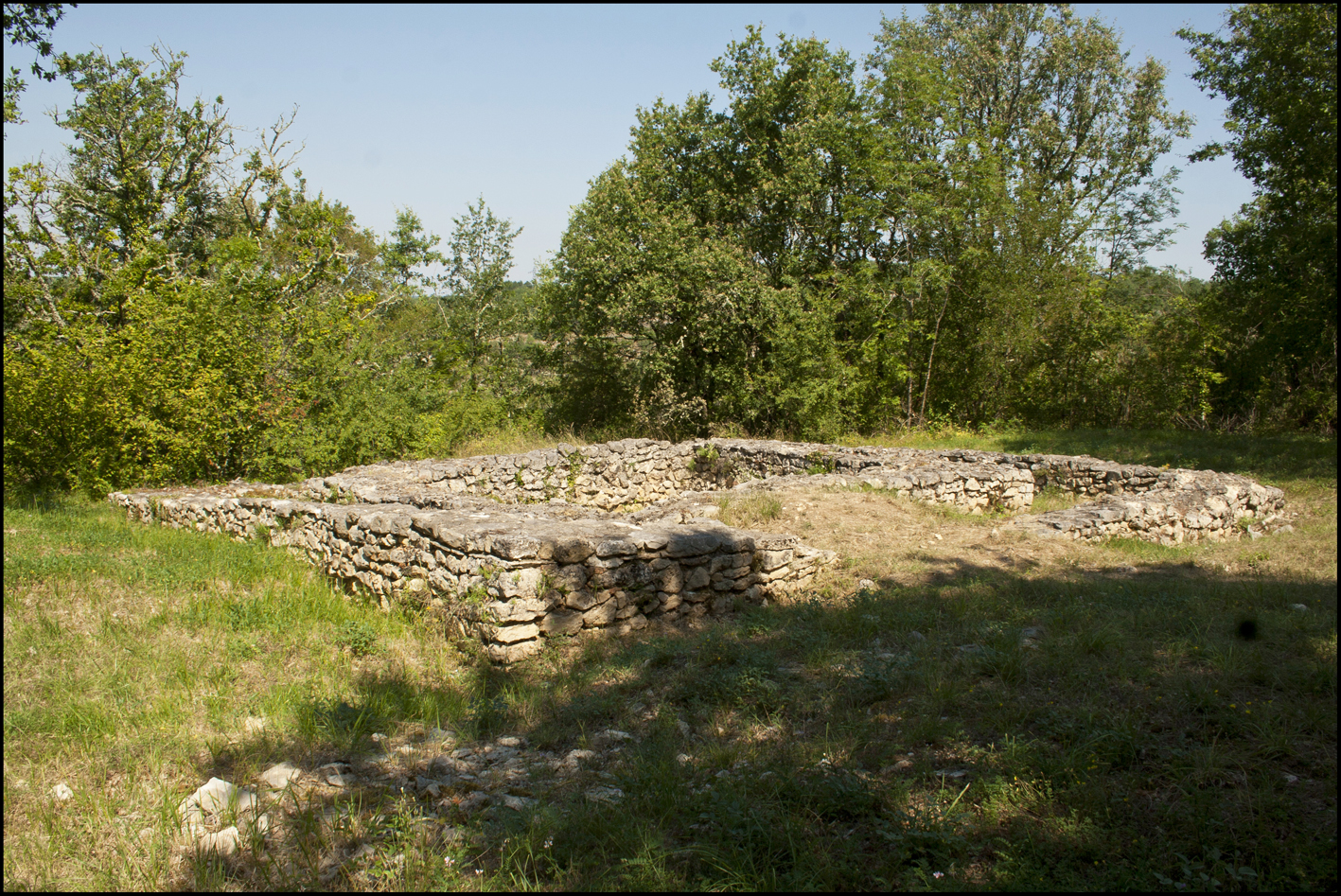
Oppidum de I'impernal

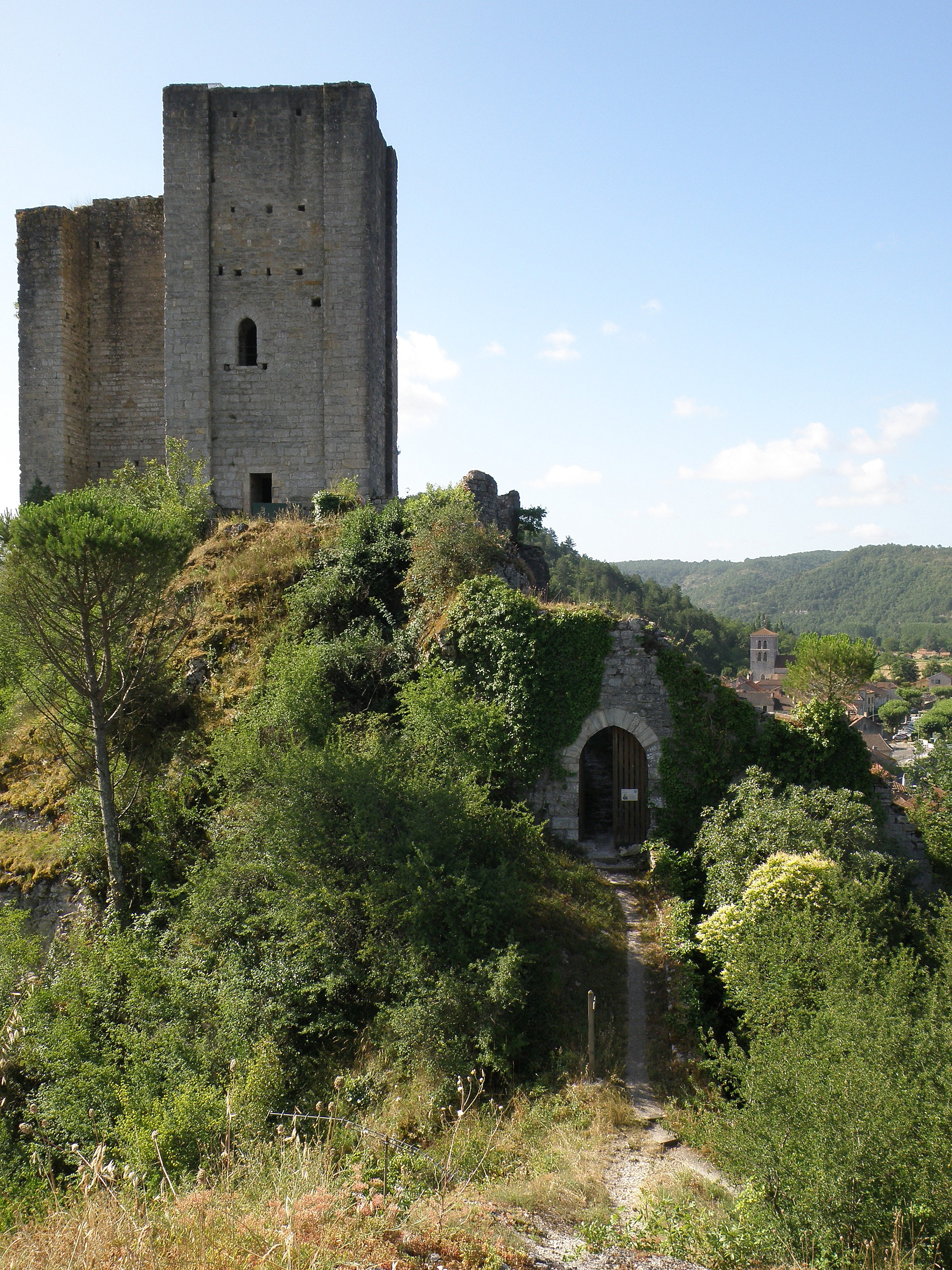
Luzech Donjon

- Château de Caïx
- Luzech Château or Luzech Tower. The tower of the old Luzech Château was classified as an ancient monument on 18 February 1905, note 6.
- Uxellodunum
- Chapel of Our Lady of the Island: The Chapel of Our Lady of the Island, 3 km to the south, dated 1504. It was commissioned by Bishop Antoine de Luzech and houses a 15th-century Virgin and Child. The building was listed as a historical monument in 1929, note 7.
- Chapel of Saint James of Luzech or of the Blue Penitents
- The Gothic chapel of the Blue Penitents, built of brick, stands out from other religious monuments in the region. The chapel was listed as a historical monument in 1995, note 8.
- The 14th and 15th-century Church of Saint-Pierre consists of a nave of three bays, flanked by side aisles, and a flat apse with a tracery window. The massive, square bell tower rises above the chancel.
- Saint-Martin-de-Caïx Church in Luzech: The church in Caïx, 2 km north of Luzech, towards Caillac, was listed as a historical monument in 1993 (note 9).
- Notre-Dame Church in Camy, 3 km west of Luzech, towards Castelfranc, was listed as a historical monument in 1976 (note 10).
- The church in Fages, 3 km west of Luzech, on the plateau.
- War memorial by Henri Bouchard.
- The Maison des Consuls (House of the Consuls) was listed as a historical monument in 1974 (note 11).
- Luzech Oppidum: The oppidum was listed as a historical monument in 1984 (note 12).

== Education ==
=== The Scholarly City ===
In 2014, the site of the Scholarly City was begun. This will bring together the nursery, primary and secondary schools. Funding is provided by the Department of the Lot, and by the town of Luzech for a total amount of €16.4 million, including €12 million for the College. The first stone was laid on 19 December 2014 by Serge Rigal (Chairman of the Department), Gérard Alazard (Mayor of Luzech) and three children: one for kindergarten, one for primary and one for college. The school will accommodate 450 students with the possibility of extending it to 500, a primary school size 150 and kindergarten size 90 on 6000 m2. Thirty companies of which a third are from the department of the Lot, participated in the construction. The Scholarly City was officially inaugurated by François Hollande, President of the Republic, in April 2017.

=== The Impernal College ===
The college of the Imperial of Luzech is located on the left bank of Lot, 150 meters south of the east-west route D8. For the 2014-2015 school year, 292 students were enrolled and divided into twelve classes, on four levels, from sixth to third. 51 students are part of the rugby Sports Section.

=== Primary school ===
The public primary school has 69 students divided into 3 classes of 16 students each.

=== Nursery school ===
The public kindergarten hosted 71 children, divided into three classes, in 2012.

== Sport ==
The rugby club XV, the Sports Union of Luzech, evolved into the Championship of France, 3rd Federal division, for the 2010-2011 season. It was relegated for the 2011-2012 season. In 2013-2014, it was promoted again to a higher grade.

== Personalities linked to the commune ==
- Margrethe II of Denmark
- Henri de Laborde de Monpezat, prince of Denmark
- Bernadette Ségol, Secretary General of the European Confederation of the unions, is a native of Luzech.
