= Canton of Luzech =

Coordinates: 44.48°N 1.29°E

The canton of Luzech is an administrative division of the Lot department, southern France. Its borders were modified at the French canton reorganisation which came into effect in March 2015. Its seat is in Luzech.

It consists of the following communes:

1. Albas
2. Anglars-Juillac
3. Barguelonne-en-Quercy
4. Bélaye
5. Caillac
6. Cambayrac
7. Carnac-Rouffiac
8. Castelfranc
9. Douelle
10. Lendou-en-Quercy
11. Luzech
12. Montcuq-en-Quercy-Blanc
13. Montlauzun
14. Parnac
15. Saint-Vincent-Rive-d'Olt
16. Sauzet
17. Villesèque
