= Jean Dionis du Séjour =

French politician (born 1956)

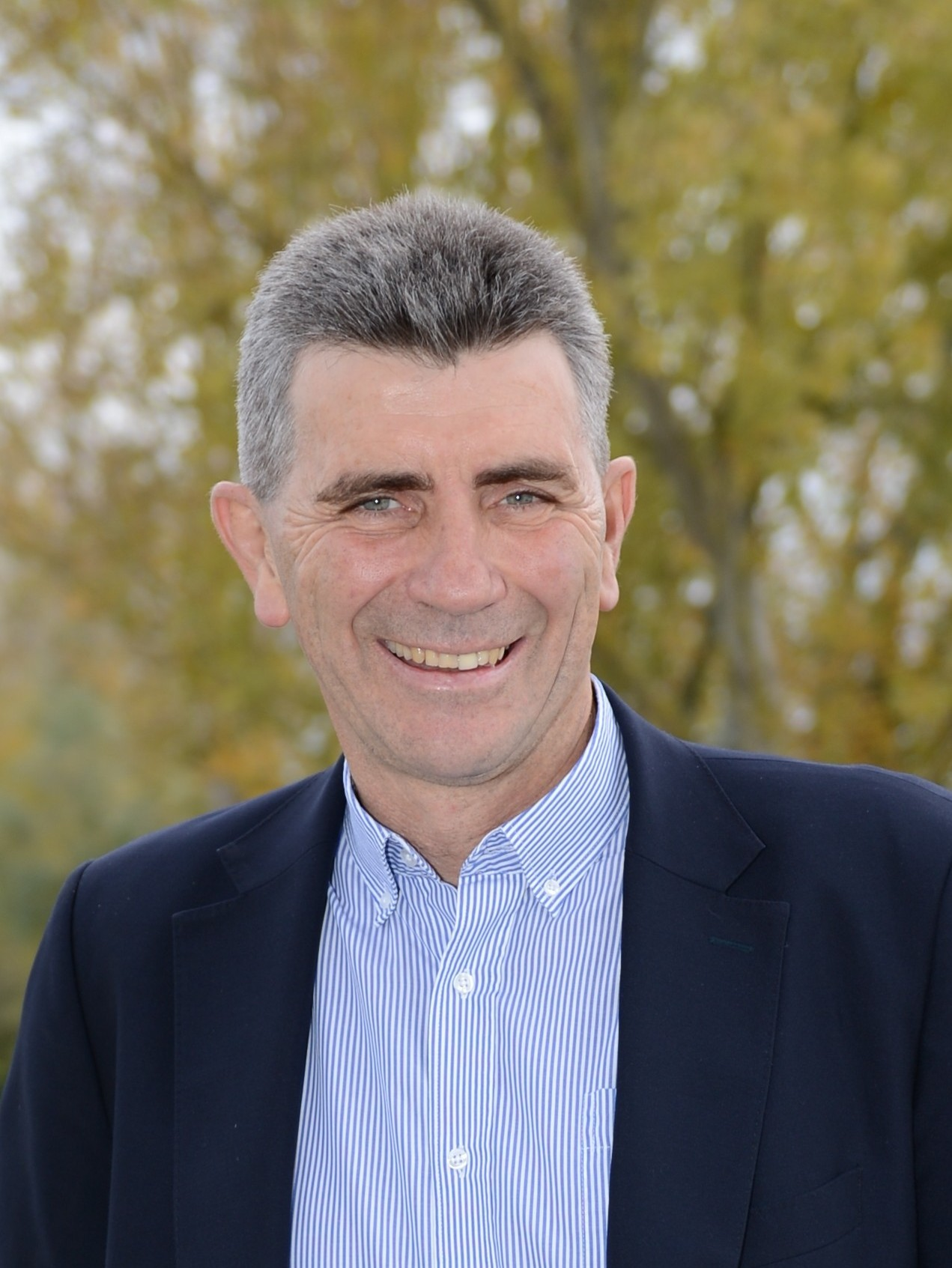
- Dionis du Séjour in 2013

Mayor of Agen
- Incumbent
- Assumed office 22 March 2008
- Preceded by: Alain Veyret

Member of the National Assembly for Lot-et-Garonne's 1st constituency
- In office 19 June 2002 – 19 June 2012
- Preceded by: Alain Veyret
- Succeeded by: Lucette Lousteau

Member of the Regional Council of Nouvelle-Aquitaine
- Incumbent
- Assumed office 4 January 2016

Member of the Regional Council of Aquitaine
- In office 29 March 2004 – 16 March 2008

Personal details
- Born: 21 September 1956 (age 69) Agen, France
- Party: Union for French Democracy (until 2007); The Centrists/Union of Democrats and Independents (2007–2018); Democratic Movement (2018–present)
- Other political affiliations: Centre of Social Democrats (1990s); Democratic Force (1990s)
- Education: École Centrale Paris
- Profession: Engineer

Jean Dionis du Séjour (French pronunciation: [ʒɑ̃ djɔnis dy seʒuʁ]; born 21 September 1956), also known as Jean Dionis, is a French politician who has served as Mayor of Agen since 2008. A member of the Democratic Movement (MoDem), he is formerly a member of the Union for French Democracy (UDF) and The Centrists (LC). He represented the 1st constituency of the Lot-et-Garonne department in the National Assembly from 2002 to 2012.

== Biography ==
Dionis du Séjour was a Deputy Mayor of Agen from 1995 to 2001 under Mayor Paul Chollet. He retained a seat in the municipal council of Agen until his resignation in 2004.

He served as the deputy in the National Assembly for the 1st constituency of the Lot-et-Garonne department from 2002 to 2012. He was elected to the mayorship of Agen following the 2008 municipal election.

He lost his parliamentary seat at the 2012 legislative election, which he unsuccessfully tried to regain at the 2017 election under the Union of Democrats and Independents (UDI) banner with the support of The Republicans (LR), when he was defeated in the second round by Michel Lauzzana of La République En Marche! (LREM).

He was elected a member of the newly established Regional Council of Nouvelle-Aquitaine at the 2015 regional election, having previously held a seat in the Regional Council of Aquitaine from 2004 until his resignation in 2008.
