= Fumel =

- Commune
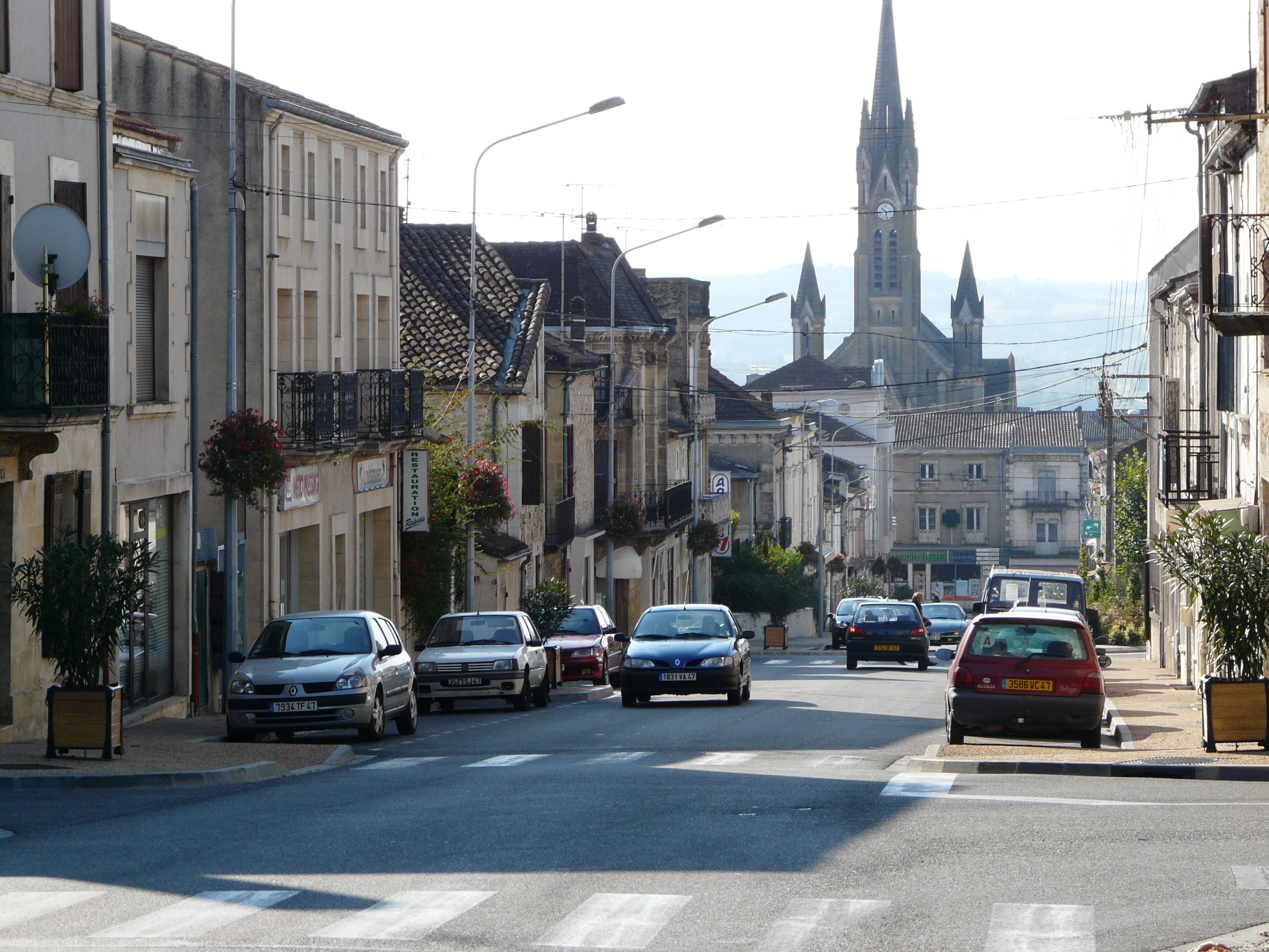
- Rue de Fumel

- Coat of arms
- Location of Fumel
- Location within France Location within Nouvelle-Aquitaine
- Coordinates: 44°29′49″N 0°58′05″E
- Country: France
- Region: Nouvelle-Aquitaine
- Department: Lot-et-Garonne
- Arrondissement: Villeneuve-sur-Lot
- Canton: Le Fumélois
- Intercommunality: Fumel Vallée du Lot

Government
  - Mayor (2020–2026): Jean-Louis Costes
- Area^{1}: 22.66 km^{2} (8.75 sq mi)
- Elevation: 107 m (351 ft)
- Highest elevation: 207 m (679 ft)
- Lowest elevation: 57 m (187 ft)
- Population (2023): 4,690
  - Density: 207/km^{2} (536/sq mi)
- Demonym(s): Fumélois, Fuméloises
- Time zone: UTC+01:00 (CET)
  - Summer (DST): UTC+02:00 (CEST)
- INSEE/Postal code: 47106 /47500
- Website: site officiel
- ^{1} French Land Register data, which excludes lakes, ponds, glaciers > 1 km^{2} (0.386 sq mi or 247 acres) and river estuaries.

Fumel (French pronunciation: [fymɛl]; Occitan: Fumèl) is a commune in the Lot-et-Garonne department in south-western France. Situated at the right bank of the river Lot, it is the centre of a small agglomeration (population 12,851 in 2022) which consists of 7 communes, including Monsempron-Libos and Montayral. In 1438, during the Hundred Years' War, it was pillaged by Rodrigo de Villandrando. It is twinned with Uttoxeter, United Kingdom.

== Population ==
Historical population
Year	Pop.	±% p.a.
1968	7,067	—
1975	6,937	−0.26%
1982	6,582	−0.75%
1990	5,882	−1.40%
1999	5,423	−0.90%
2007	5,230	−0.45%
2012	5,172	−0.22%
2017	4,834	−1.34%
2023	4,690	−0.50%
Source: INSEE

== See also ==
- Communes of the Lot-et-Garonne department
