= Christian Laurissergues =

French politician (1939–2026)

Deputy of the French National Assembly
- In office 2 April 1973 – 14 May 1988
- Preceded by: Georges Caillau
- Succeeded by: Paul Chollet (indirectly)
- Constituency: Lot-et-Garonne's 1st constituency (1973–1986) proportional representation (1986–1988)

Member of the General Council of Lot-et-Garonne for the Canton of Agen-Est
- In office 25 March 1979 – 17 March 1985
- Preceded by: Gérard Duprat
- Succeeded by: Gilbert Fongaro

Personal details
- Born: 7 August 1939 Bordeaux, France
- Died: 11 June 2026 (aged 86)
- Party: PS

Christian Laurissergues (French: [kʁistjˈɑ̃ loʁisˈɛʁɡ]; 7 August 1939 – 11 June 2026) was a French politician of the Socialist Party.

Laurissergues served as a deputy of the National Assembly from 1973 to 1988 and was a member of the General Council of Lot-et-Garonne from 1979 to 1985.

Laurissergues died on 11 June 2026, at the age of 86.
