= Departmental Council of Lot-et-Garonne =

Departmental legislature in France

- Flag of Lot-et-Garonne

Leadership
- President: Sophie Borderie, PS

Website
- www.lotetgaronne.fr/accueil

The Departmental Council of Lot-et-Garonne (French: Conseil départemental de Lot-et-Garonne, Occitan: Conselh departamental d'Òut e Garona) is the deliberative assembly of the French department of Lot-et-Garonne. Its headquarters are in Agen.

== Composition ==
The departmental council of Lot-et-Garonne includes 42 departmental councilors elected from the 21 cantons of Lot-et-Garonne.

Composition by party (as of 2021)
Party	Acronym	Seats	Groups
France Lot-et-Garonne Departmental Council 2021
Majority (24 seats)
Socialist Party	PS	17	Departmental majority
Miscellaneous left	DVG	4	Departmental majority
Europe Ecology – The Greens	EELV	2	Departmental majority
La France Insoumise	LFI	1	Departmental majority
Opposition (16 seats)
Miscellaneous right	DVD	13	L’avenir ensemble
Miscellaneous centre	DVC	3	L’avenir ensemble
The Republicans	LR	1	L’avenir ensemble
Sans étiquette	SE	1	La dynamique citoyenne

== Executive ==
=== President ===
On 1 July 2021, Sophie Borderie was re-elected president of the departmental council.

=== Vice-presidents ===
In addition to the president, the executive consists of 12 vice-presidents.

Vice-presidents of the Departmental Council of Lot-et-Garonne (since 2021)
Order	Name	Canton (constituency)	Delegation
1st	Nicolas Lacombe	L'Albret	Educational and college policies
2nd	Christine Gonzato-Roques	Le Haut Agenais Périgord	Social development, integration and housing
3rd	Christian Dezalos	Agen-2	Finance, heritage, public policy analysis, general administration and human resources
4th	Laurence Lamy	Agen-2	Citizenship
5th	Jacques Bilirit	Marmande-2	Culture
6th	Valérie Tonin	Lavardac	Higher education
7th	Daniel Borie	Le Fumélois	Regional planning, infrastructure and mobility
8th	Marylène Paillarès	L'Albret	Sport, gender equality and anti-discrimination laws
9th	Joel Hocquelet	Marmande-1	Agriculture and forestry
10th	Danielle Dhélias	Le Val du Dropt	Rurality, sustainable development and the environment
11th	Ludovic Biasotto	Lavardac	Economic development, tourism, and contractual policies
12th	Annie Messina-Ventadoux	Villeneuve-sur-Lot-2	Elderly and medical demography
