= Olivier Campan =

French rugby union player (born 1970)

- Born: 15 March 1970 (age 56) Gers, France
- Height: 5 ft 11 in (180 cm)
- Weight: 189 lb (86 kg)

Rugby union career
- Position: Centre
International career
| Years | Team | Apps | (Points) |
| 1993–96 | France | 6 | (5) |

Olivier Campan (born 15 March 1970) is a French former rugby union international who represented France in six Test matches during the 1990s.

A native of Gers, Campan debuted for France against the Springboks on the 1993 tour of South Africa. He was the starting centre for France in two matches in the 1996 Five Nations Championship. In 1997, he represented France in rugby sevens at the World Cup in Hong Kong. He played the majority of his club rugby for SU Agen.

Campan has been deputy mayor for the town of Saumont and was previously substitute to Socialist Party MP Lucette Lousteau for Lot-et-Garonne's 1st constituency.

== See also ==
- List of France national rugby union players
