= Thézac, Lot-et-Garonne =

Thézac
- Commune
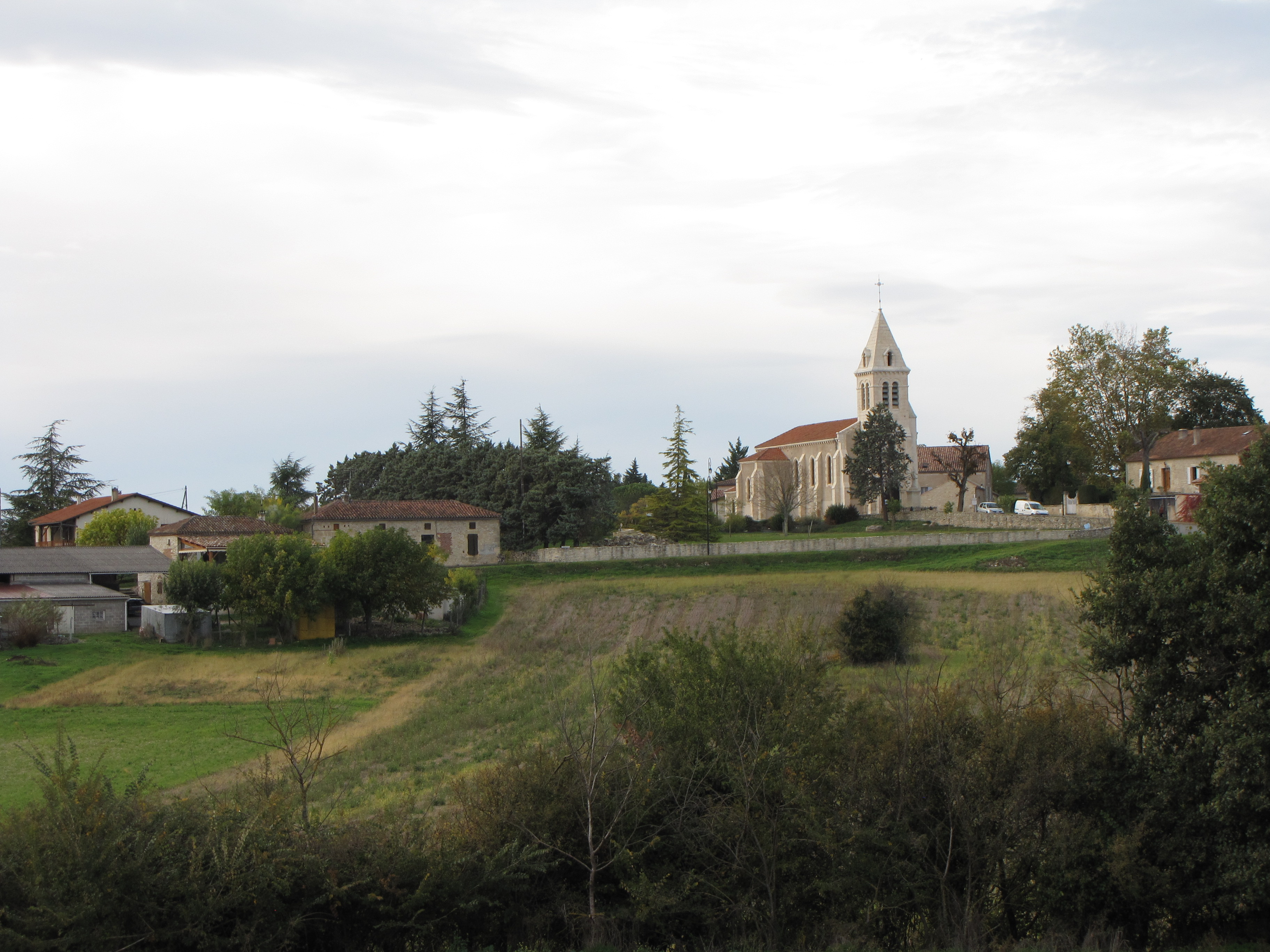
- The church and surrounding buildings in Thézac
- Location of Thézac
- Location within France Location within Nouvelle-Aquitaine
- Coordinates: 44°25′48″N 1°00′57″E
- Country: France
- Region: Nouvelle-Aquitaine
- Department: Lot-et-Garonne
- Arrondissement: Villeneuve-sur-Lot
- Canton: Le Fumélois
- Intercommunality: Fumel Vallée du Lot

Government
  - Mayor (2020–2026): Jean-Luc Mucha
- Area^{1}: 11.21 km^{2} (4.33 sq mi)
- Elevation: 223 m (732 ft)
- Highest elevation: 257 m (843 ft)
- Lowest elevation: 120 m (390 ft)
- Population (2023): 211
  - Density: 18.8/km^{2} (48.7/sq mi)
- Time zone: UTC+01:00 (CET)
  - Summer (DST): UTC+02:00 (CEST)
- INSEE/Postal code: 47307 /47370
- ^{1} French Land Register data, which excludes lakes, ponds, glaciers > 1 km^{2} (0.386 sq mi or 247 acres) and river estuaries.

Thézac (French pronunciation: [tezak]; Occitan: Tesac) is a commune in the Lot-et-Garonne department in south-western France.

== See also ==
- Communes of the Lot-et-Garonne department
