= Saint-Vite =

- Commune
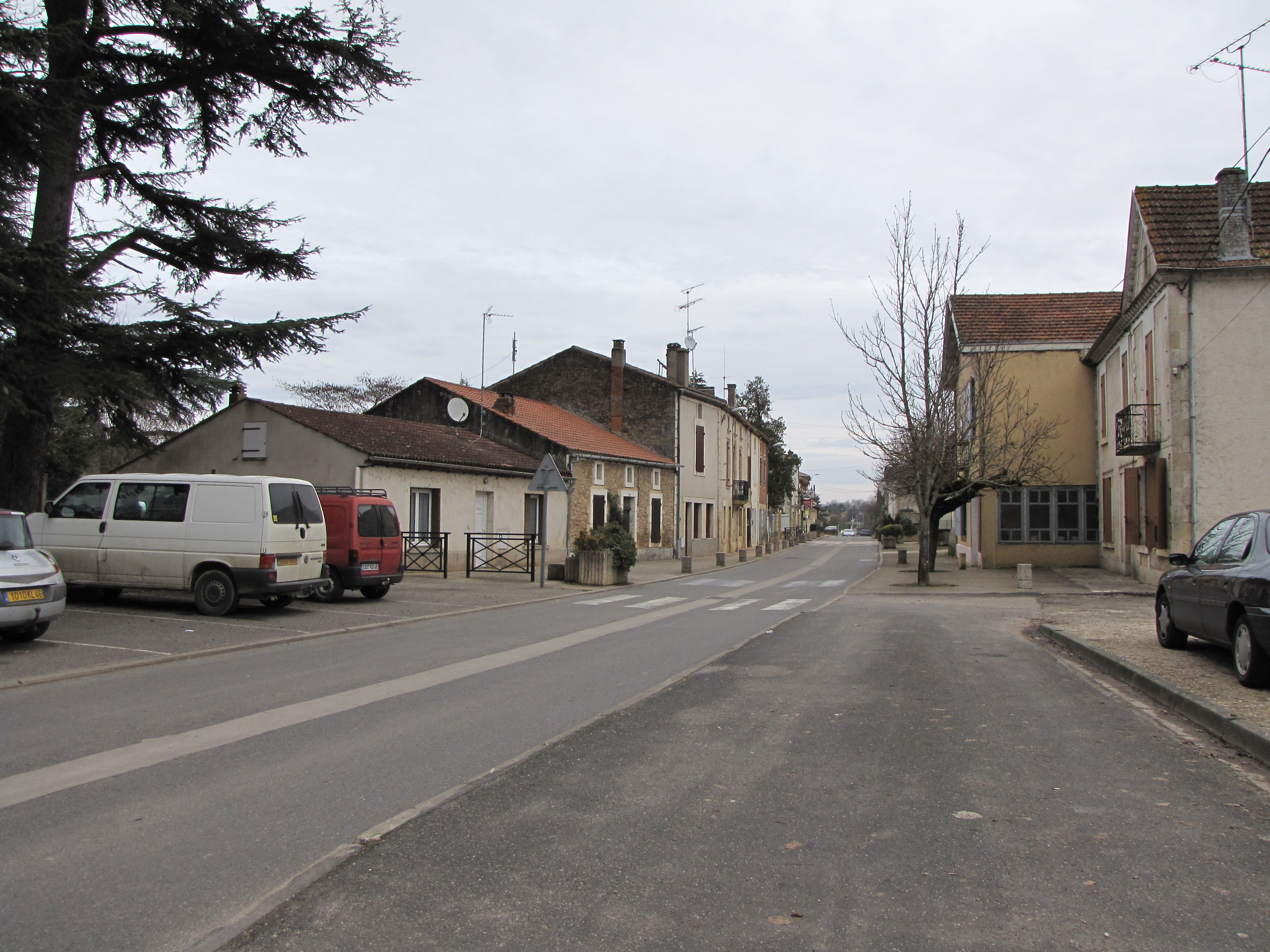
- A street in Saint-Vite
- Location of Saint-Vite
- Location within France Location within Nouvelle-Aquitaine
- Coordinates: 44°28′28″N 0°56′28″E
- Country: France
- Region: Nouvelle-Aquitaine
- Department: Lot-et-Garonne
- Arrondissement: Villeneuve-sur-Lot
- Canton: Le Fumélois

Government
  - Mayor (2020–2026): Daniel Borie
- Area^{1}: 5.47 km^{2} (2.11 sq mi)
- Elevation: 70 m (230 ft)
- Highest elevation: 105 m (344 ft)
- Lowest elevation: 57 m (187 ft)
- Population (2023): 1,192
  - Density: 218/km^{2} (564/sq mi)
- Time zone: UTC+01:00 (CET)
  - Summer (DST): UTC+02:00 (CEST)
- INSEE/Postal code: 47283 /47500
- ^{1} French Land Register data, which excludes lakes, ponds, glaciers > 1 km^{2} (0.386 sq mi or 247 acres) and river estuaries.

Saint-Vite (French pronunciation: [sɛ̃ vit]; Occitan: Sent Vit de Dòrn) is a commune in the Lot-et-Garonne department in south-western France.

== See also ==
- Communes of the Lot-et-Garonne department
