= Saint-Georges, Lot-et-Garonne =

Saint-Georges
- Commune
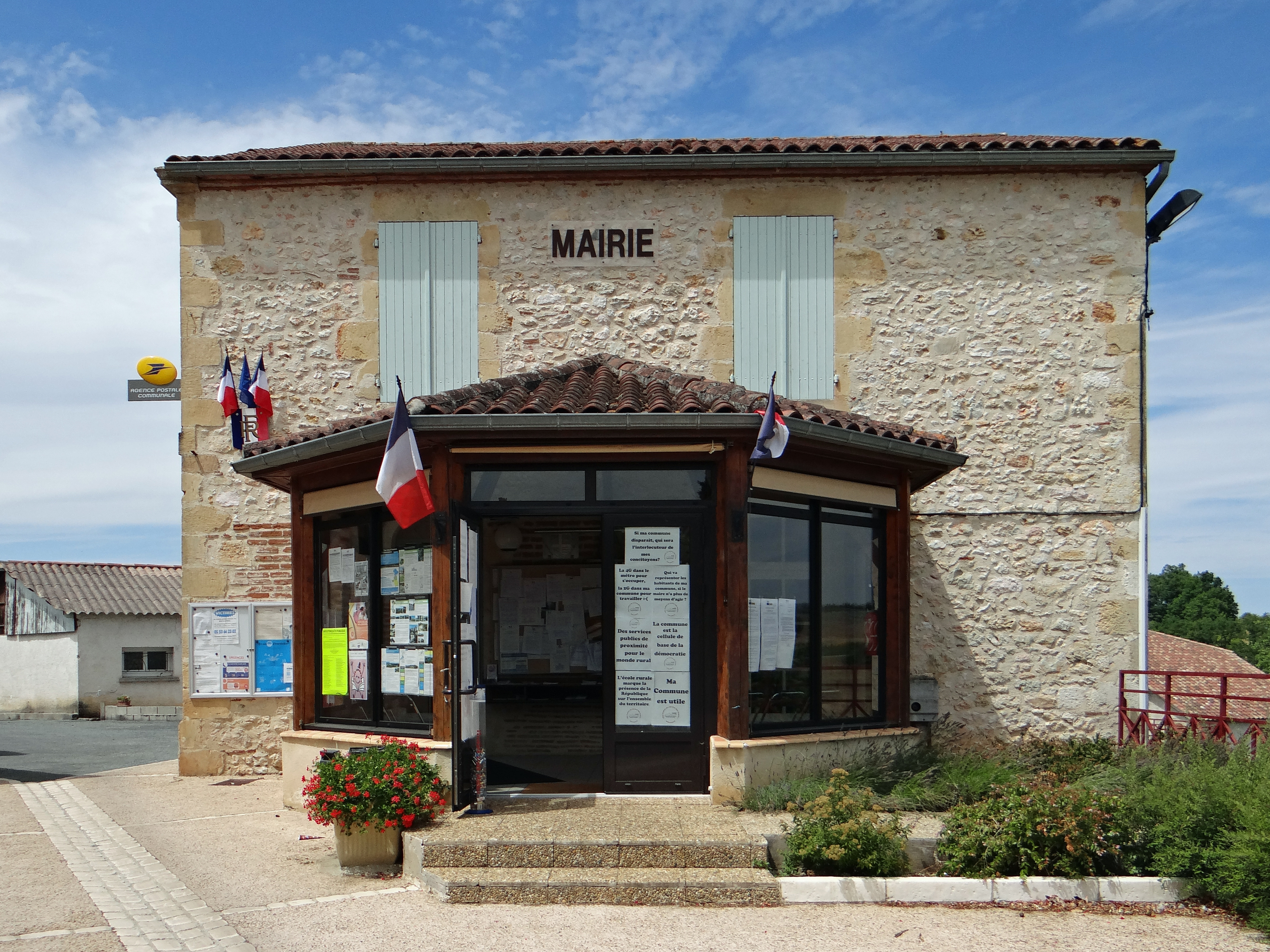
- Saint-Georges Town hall
- Location of Saint-Georges
- Location within France Location within Nouvelle-Aquitaine
- Coordinates: 44°26′34″N 0°56′05″E
- Country: France
- Region: Nouvelle-Aquitaine
- Department: Lot-et-Garonne
- Arrondissement: Villeneuve-sur-Lot
- Canton: Le Fumélois

Government
  - Mayor (2020–2026): Marie-Hélène Belleau
- Area^{1}: 15.96 km^{2} (6.16 sq mi)
- Elevation: 122 m (400 ft)
- Highest elevation: 158 m (518 ft)
- Lowest elevation: 55 m (180 ft)
- Population (2023): 492
  - Density: 30.8/km^{2} (79.8/sq mi)
- Time zone: UTC+01:00 (CET)
  - Summer (DST): UTC+02:00 (CEST)
- INSEE/Postal code: 47328 /47370
- ^{1} French Land Register data, which excludes lakes, ponds, glaciers > 1 km^{2} (0.386 sq mi or 247 acres) and river estuaries.

Saint-Georges (French pronunciation: [sɛ̃ ʒɔʁʒ]; Occitan: Sent Jòrdi) is a commune in the Lot-et-Garonne department in south-western France.

== See also ==
- Communes of the Lot-et-Garonne department
