= Condezaygues =

- Commune
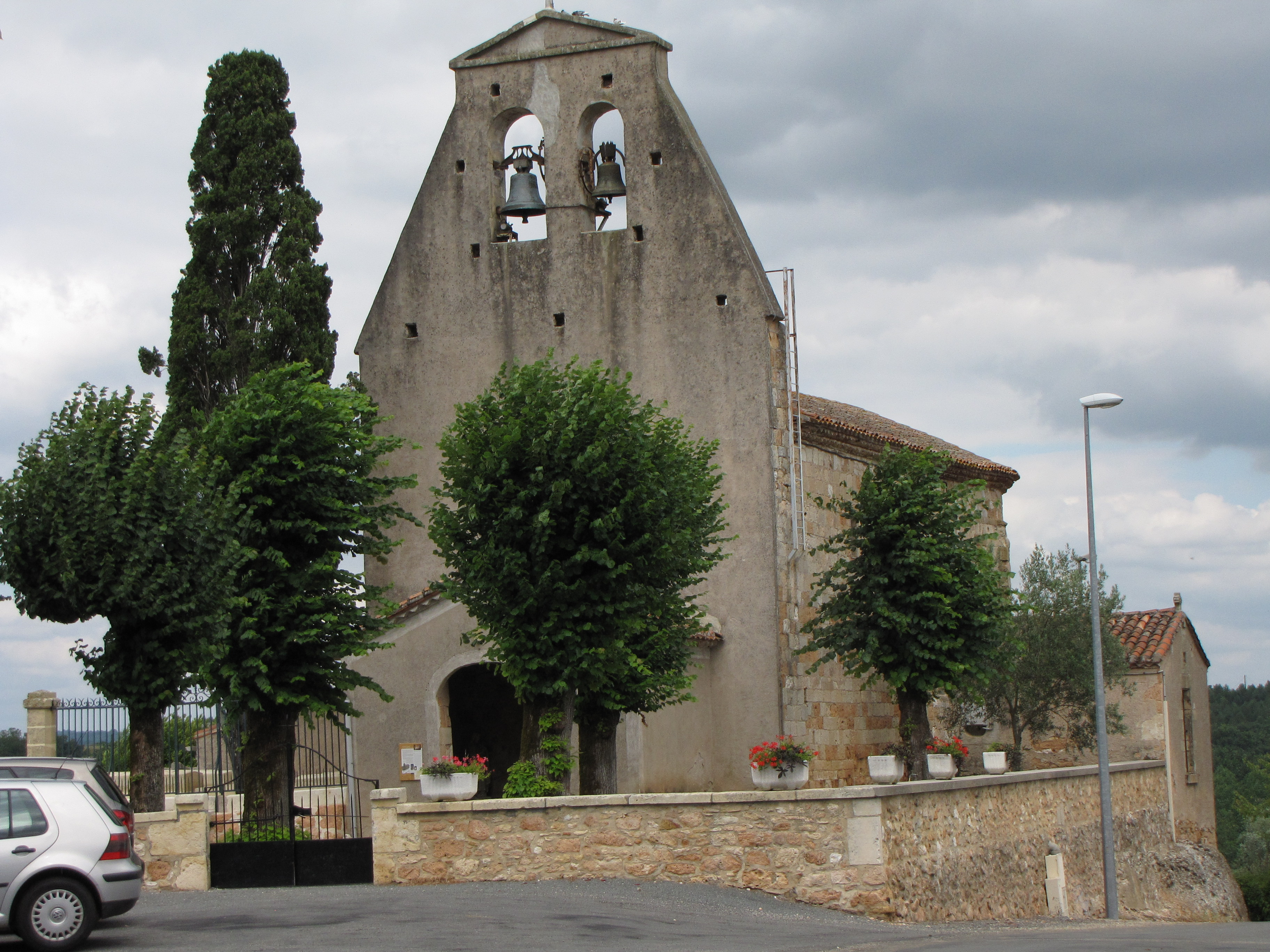
- The church in Condezaygues
- Location of Condezaygues
- Location within France Location within Nouvelle-Aquitaine
- Coordinates: 44°29′16″N 0°55′03″E
- Country: France
- Region: Nouvelle-Aquitaine
- Department: Lot-et-Garonne
- Arrondissement: Villeneuve-sur-Lot
- Canton: Le Fumélois
- Intercommunality: Fumel Vallée du Lot

Government
  - Mayor (2020–2026): Éric Grasset
- Area^{1}: 10.81 km^{2} (4.17 sq mi)
- Elevation: 74 m (243 ft)
- Highest elevation: 172 m (564 ft)
- Lowest elevation: 56 m (184 ft)
- Population (2023): 839
  - Density: 77.6/km^{2} (201/sq mi)
- Time zone: UTC+01:00 (CET)
  - Summer (DST): UTC+02:00 (CEST)
- INSEE/Postal code: 47070 /47500
- Website: Condezaygues.fr
- ^{1} French Land Register data, which excludes lakes, ponds, glaciers > 1 km^{2} (0.386 sq mi or 247 acres) and river estuaries.

Condezaygues (French pronunciation: [kɔ̃dəzajɡ]; Occitan: Condesaigas) is a commune in the Lot-et-Garonne department in south-western France.

== See also ==
- Communes of the Lot-et-Garonne department
