= Cuzorn =

- Commune
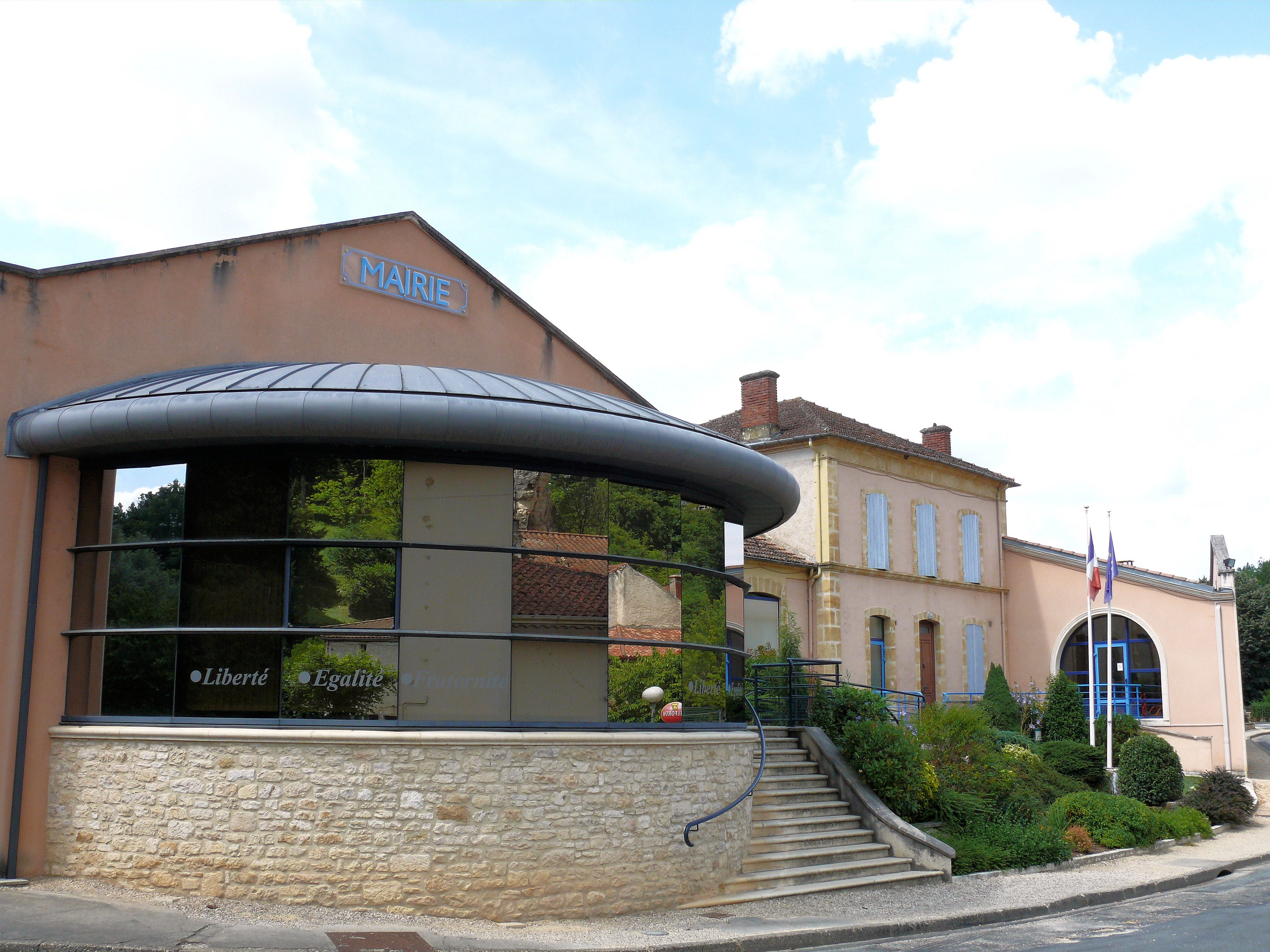
- The town hall in Cuzorn
- Location of Cuzorn
- Location within France Location within Nouvelle-Aquitaine
- Coordinates: 44°32′45″N 0°56′56″E
- Country: France
- Region: Nouvelle-Aquitaine
- Department: Lot-et-Garonne
- Arrondissement: Villeneuve-sur-Lot
- Canton: Le Fumélois
- Intercommunality: Fumel Vallée du Lot

Government
  - Mayor (2020–2026): Didier Caminade
- Area^{1}: 23.34 km^{2} (9.01 sq mi)
- Elevation: 92 m (302 ft)
- Highest elevation: 242 m (794 ft)
- Lowest elevation: 76 m (249 ft)
- Population (2023): 845
  - Density: 36.2/km^{2} (93.8/sq mi)
- Time zone: UTC+01:00 (CET)
  - Summer (DST): UTC+02:00 (CEST)
- INSEE/Postal code: 47077 /47500
- ^{1} French Land Register data, which excludes lakes, ponds, glaciers > 1 km^{2} (0.386 sq mi or 247 acres) and river estuaries.

Cuzorn (French pronunciation: [kyzɔʁn]; Occitan: Cusòrn) is a commune in the Lot-et-Garonne department in south-western France.

== See also ==
- Communes of the Lot-et-Garonne department
