= Bourlens =

- Commune
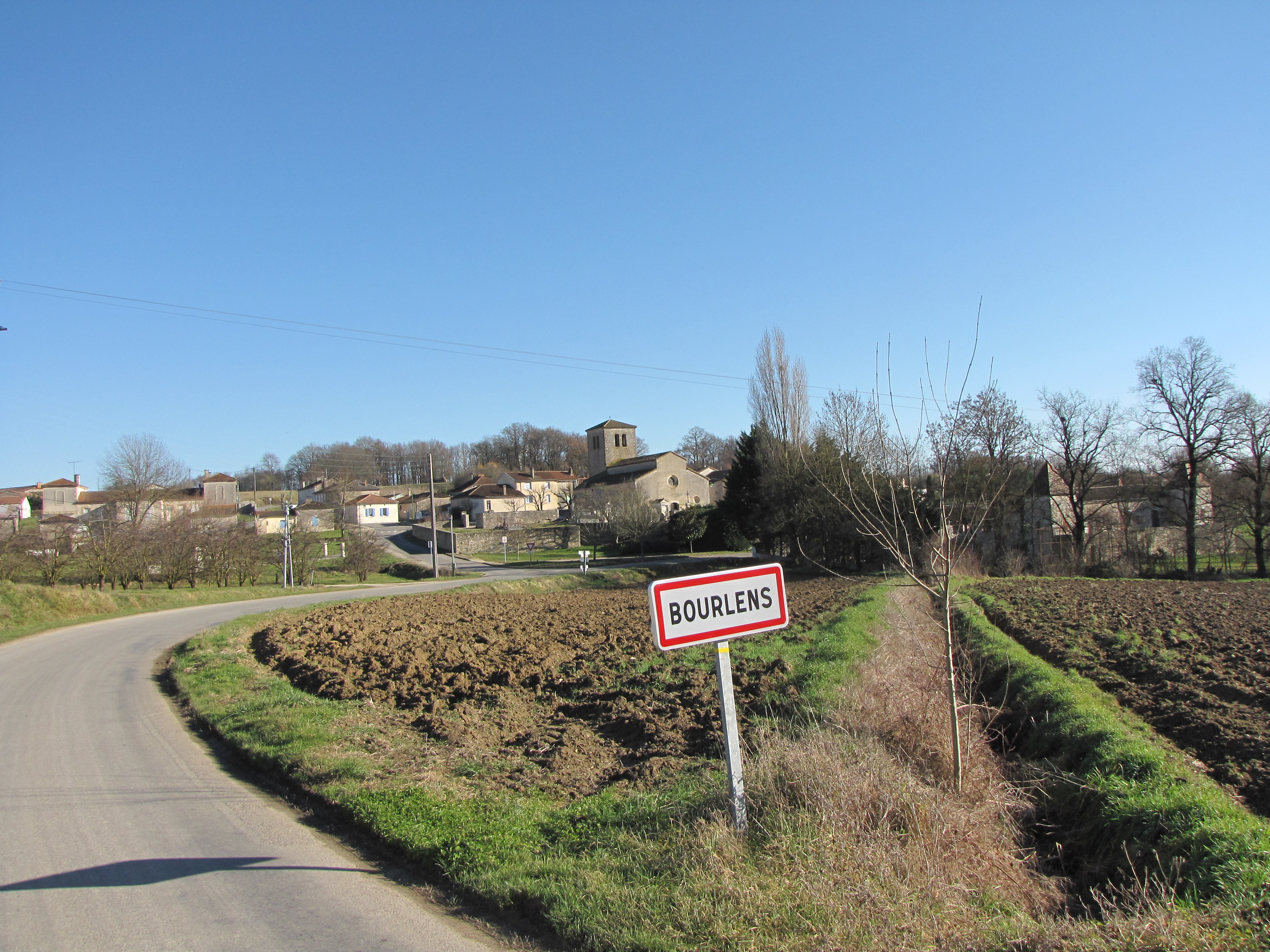
- The road into Bourlens
- Location of Bourlens
- Location within France Location within Nouvelle-Aquitaine
- Coordinates: 44°25′09″N 0°58′19″E
- Country: France
- Region: Nouvelle-Aquitaine
- Department: Lot-et-Garonne
- Arrondissement: Villeneuve-sur-Lot
- Canton: Le Fumélois

Government
  - Mayor (2020–2026): Jean-Maire Queyrel
- Area^{1}: 15.44 km^{2} (5.96 sq mi)
- Elevation: 180 m (590 ft)
- Highest elevation: 235 m (771 ft)
- Lowest elevation: 96 m (315 ft)
- Population (2023): 372
  - Density: 24.1/km^{2} (62.4/sq mi)
- Time zone: UTC+01:00 (CET)
  - Summer (DST): UTC+02:00 (CEST)
- INSEE/Postal code: 47036 /47370
- ^{1} French Land Register data, which excludes lakes, ponds, glaciers > 1 km^{2} (0.386 sq mi or 247 acres) and river estuaries.

Bourlens is a commune in the Lot-et-Garonne department in southwestern France.

== Population ==
Historical population
| Year | Pop. | ±% p.a. |
|---|---|---|
| 1968 | 308 | — |
| 1975 | 342 | +1.51% |
| 1982 | 368 | +1.05% |
| 1990 | 376 | +0.27% |
| 1999 | 354 | −0.67% |
| 2007 | 364 | +0.35% |
| 2012 | 350 | −0.78% |
| 2017 | 380 | +1.66% |
| 2023 | 372 | −0.35% |
Source: INSEE

== See also ==
- Communes of the Lot-et-Garonne department
