= Anthe =

Anthe may refer to:

- Anthe (moon), natural satellite of Saturn
- Anthe, alternate name of Anthela (Thessaly), an ancient town of Thessaly, Greece
- Anthé, a village in the southern France
- Anthe Philippides, an Australian judge of the Supreme Court of Queensland
- Anthe (mythology), one of the daughters of the giant Alcyoneus
- Georges-Charles de Heeckeren d'Anthès, a baron of the Second French Empire
