= Trentels =

- Commune
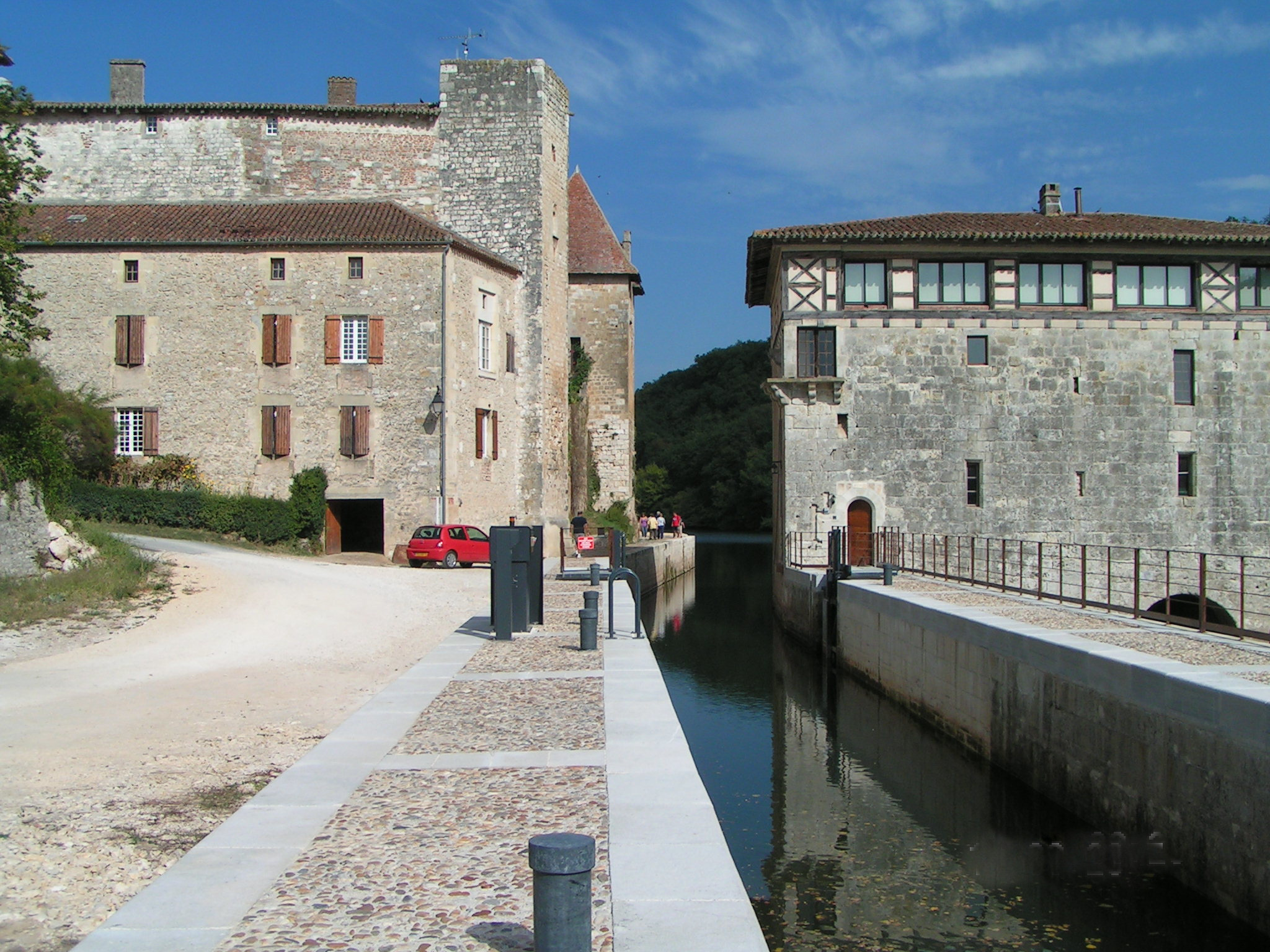
- The lock, castle and mill in Lustrac
- Location of Trentels
- Location within France Location within Nouvelle-Aquitaine
- Coordinates: 44°26′11″N 0°51′49″E
- Country: France
- Region: Nouvelle-Aquitaine
- Department: Lot-et-Garonne
- Arrondissement: Villeneuve-sur-Lot
- Canton: Le Fumélois
- Intercommunality: Fumel Vallée du Lot

Government
  - Mayor (2020–2026): Lionel Paillas
- Area^{1}: 19.47 km^{2} (7.52 sq mi)
- Elevation: 78 m (256 ft)
- Highest elevation: 222 m (728 ft)
- Lowest elevation: 52 m (171 ft)
- Population (2023): 843
  - Density: 43.3/km^{2} (112/sq mi)
- Time zone: UTC+01:00 (CET)
  - Summer (DST): UTC+02:00 (CEST)
- INSEE/Postal code: 47315 /47140
- ^{1} French Land Register data, which excludes lakes, ponds, glaciers > 1 km^{2} (0.386 sq mi or 247 acres) and river estuaries.

Trentels (French pronunciation: [tʁɛ̃tɛl]) is a commune in the Lot-et-Garonne department in south-western France.

== See also ==
- Communes of the Lot-et-Garonne department
