= Cazideroque =

- Commune
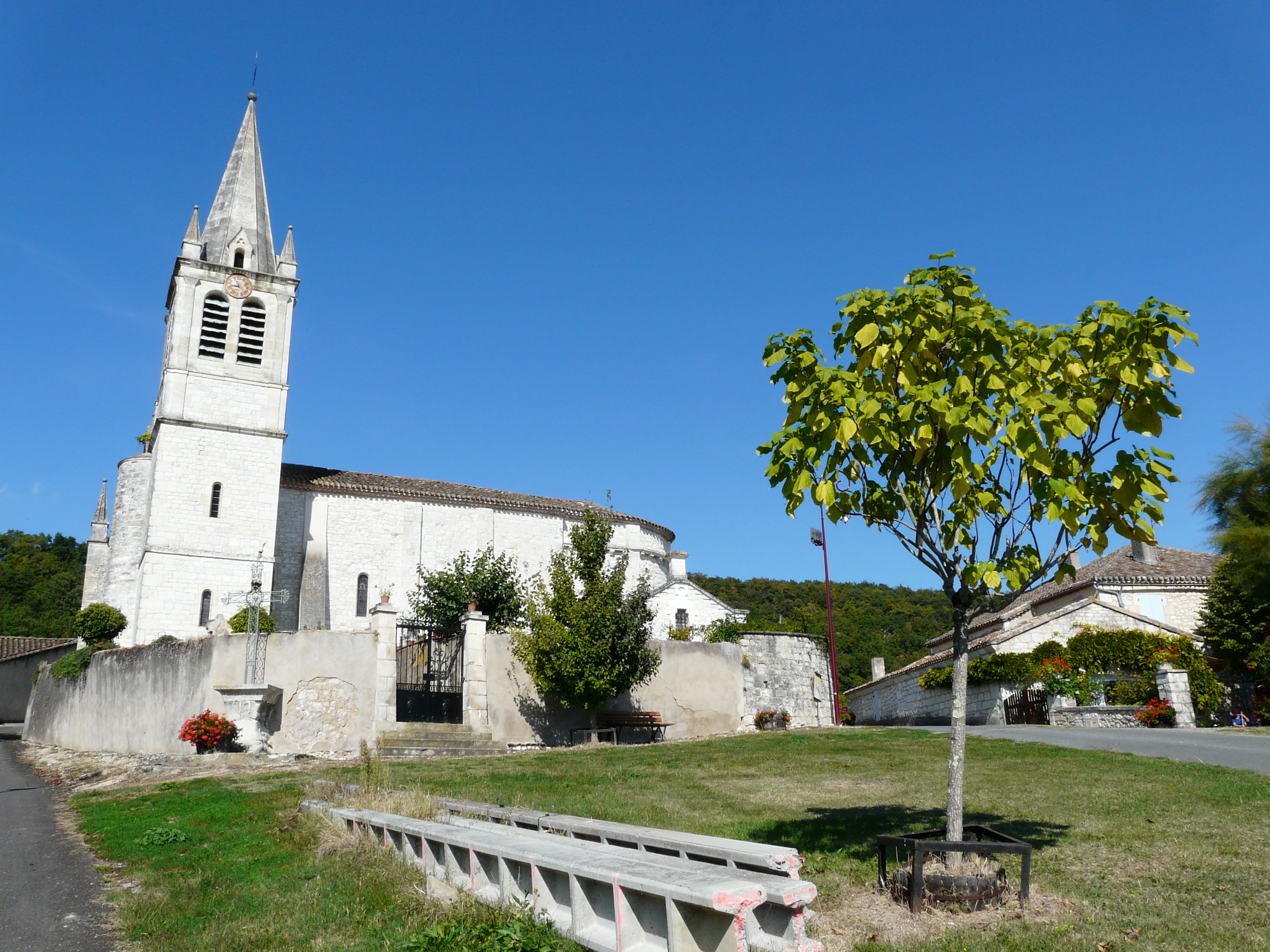
- The church in Cazideroque
- Location of Cazideroque
- Location within France Location within Nouvelle-Aquitaine
- Coordinates: 44°23′59″N 0°55′46″E
- Country: France
- Region: Nouvelle-Aquitaine
- Department: Lot-et-Garonne
- Arrondissement: Villeneuve-sur-Lot
- Canton: Le Fumélois
- Intercommunality: Fumel Vallée du Lot

Government
  - Mayor (2020–2026): Jean-Pierre Arondel
- Area^{1}: 11.94 km^{2} (4.61 sq mi)
- Elevation: 150 m (490 ft)
- Highest elevation: 237 m (778 ft)
- Lowest elevation: 80 m (260 ft)
- Population (2023): 249
  - Density: 20.9/km^{2} (54.0/sq mi)
- Time zone: UTC+01:00 (CET)
  - Summer (DST): UTC+02:00 (CEST)
- INSEE/Postal code: 47064 /47370
- ^{1} French Land Register data, which excludes lakes, ponds, glaciers > 1 km^{2} (0.386 sq mi or 247 acres) and river estuaries.

Cazideroque (French pronunciation: [kazidəʁɔk]; Occitan: Casin de Ròca) is a commune in the Lot-et-Garonne department in south-western France.

== See also ==
- Communes of the Lot-et-Garonne department
