= Tournon-d'Agenais =

Tournon-d’Agenais
- Commune
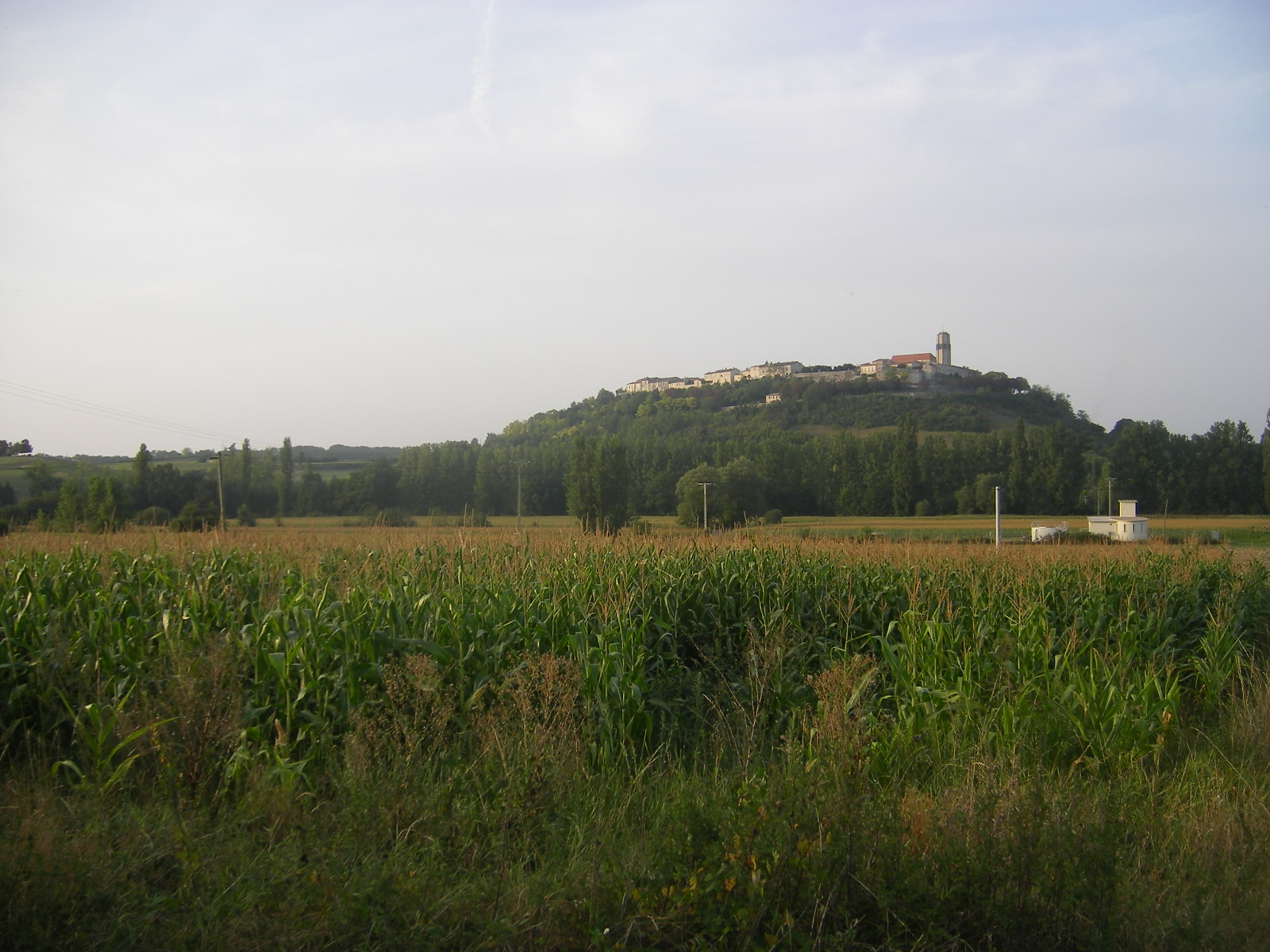
- A general view of Tournon-d’Agenais

- Coat of arms
- Location of Tournon-d’Agenais
- Location within France Location within Nouvelle-Aquitaine
- Coordinates: 44°24′03″N 0°59′46″E
- Country: France
- Region: Nouvelle-Aquitaine
- Department: Lot-et-Garonne
- Arrondissement: Villeneuve-sur-Lot
- Canton: Le Fumélois
- Intercommunality: Fumel Vallée du Lot

Government
  - Mayor (2020–2026): Didier Balsac
- Area^{1}: 21.26 km^{2} (8.21 sq mi)
- Highest elevation: 261 m (856 ft)
- Lowest elevation: 103 m (338 ft)
- Population (2023): 731
  - Density: 34.4/km^{2} (89.1/sq mi)
- Time zone: UTC+01:00 (CET)
  - Summer (DST): UTC+02:00 (CEST)
- INSEE/Postal code: 47312 /47370
- ^{1} French Land Register data, which excludes lakes, ponds, glaciers > 1 km^{2} (0.386 sq mi or 247 acres) and river estuaries.

Tournon-d'Agenais (French pronunciation: [tuʁnɔ̃ daʒ(ə)nɛ], literally Tournon of Agenais; Occitan: Tornon d'Agenés) is a commune in the Lot-et-Garonne department in south-western France. It is a member of Les Plus Beaux Villages de France (The Most Beautiful Villages of France) Association.

== History ==
Tournon-d'Agenais was founded in 1271 by Philip III (1245–1285), King of France from 1270 to 1280, son of King Louis IX, commonly known as Saint Louis. At the heart of the urban planning in this bastide is the typical central square (Place des Corniers) with stone houses above arched stone arcades. This reflects the planners’ intent to create a vital place for social and commercial exchanges among the new residents. In addition, the halle (market building), the town house and the maison of Bayle are located in this central square, showing a centralization of the municipal institutions. In the center of the square there is also the town hall, which was a symbol of a major struggle during the Middle Ages for an ample supply of water. The castle of Tournon d'Agenais was destroyed in 1212, noted by the English in 1283 and played an important role during the Hundred Year War. On the other side of the main square, a few streets away, there is the bishop's house called 'Abescat'. This was built during the 13th century and became the parish church of Tournon after the old church was destroyed in the 1560s during the French Wars of Religion.

During the Albigensian War, in 1212, Simon de Montfort gave the house of Abescat to the bishop of Agen (probably the site, the land, or an earlier house, because the current house is later). During the Hundred Years' War, the city changed hands often.

The Protestants razed the Catholic church in 1580 then it was replaced by the Abescat30. The Récollets convent was built in the 17th century on the ruins of the old Château de Tournon, in order to revive the Catholic religion after the departure of the Protestants.

During the period of the National Convention (1792-1795), the commune bore the revolutionary name of Tournon-la-Montagne.

A very large commune, Tournon-d'Agenais was divided twice in the 19th century: in 1837 to create the communes of Montayral and Saint-Vite (the population of Tournon decreased by 2,650 inhabitants), then in 1876 to create the communes of 'Anthé, Bourlens, Cazideroque, Courbiac, Masquières and Thézac (the population of Tournon decreases by 2,800 inhabitants)31.

On 3 July 1944, 1,500 men of the Panzergrenadier division "das Gepent" coming from Cahors and heading towards Villeneuve-sur-Lot, fired on the few resistance fighters present at Place du Foirail. The reprisal operations against the resistance fighters and the civilian population lasted 6 hours, during which several people were tortured and killed by the Germans. Many houses were looted, ransacked and some burned. This event is known as the sack of Tournon-d'Agenais.

Several architectural testimonies remain of its rich past, such as:

    the belfry and its lunar clock
    the 13th century House
    the Saint-André-de-Carabaysses church (or Lamothe church)
    the Abescat room
    his city tour

== See also ==
- Communes of the Lot-et-Garonne department
