= Lucette Lousteau =

French politician (1948–2026)

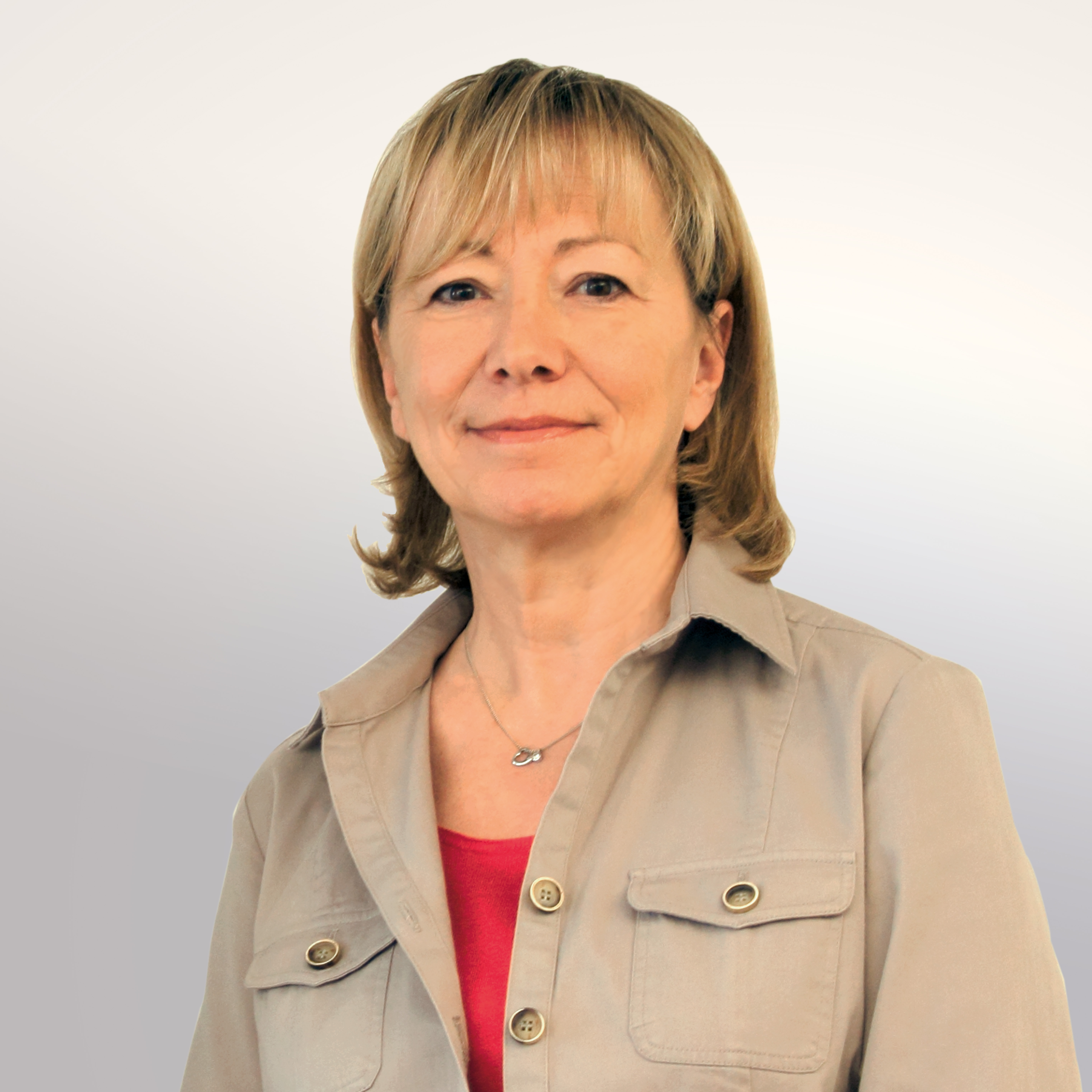
- Lousteau in 2012

Member of the French National Assembly
- In office 20 June 2012 – 20 June 2017
- Preceded by: Jean Dionis du Séjour
- Succeeded by: Michel Lauzzana
- Constituency: Lot-et-Garonne's 1st constituency

Personal details
- Born: 20 December 1948 Oran, French Algeria
- Died: 7 November 2026 (aged 77)
- Party: Socialist
- Awards: Legion of Honour (2022)

Lucette Lousteau (20 December 1948 – 7 November 2026) was a French politician.

== Life and career ==
Lousteau was elected a member of parliament for Lot-et-Garonne's 1st constituency in the 2012 French legislative election. She won with 52.02% of the votes cast against the outgoing deputy Jean Dionis du Séjour.

She was a regional councillor for the Aquitaine region, elected in 2010, and first federal secretary of the Socialist Party. Her deputy was Olivier Campan.

Lousteau was a member of the political committee of Vincent Peillon's campaign for the 2017 citizen primary.

Lousteau died on 7 November 2026, at the age of 77.

== Honours ==
- Knight of the Legion of Honour (1 January 2022)
