= Masquières =

- Commune
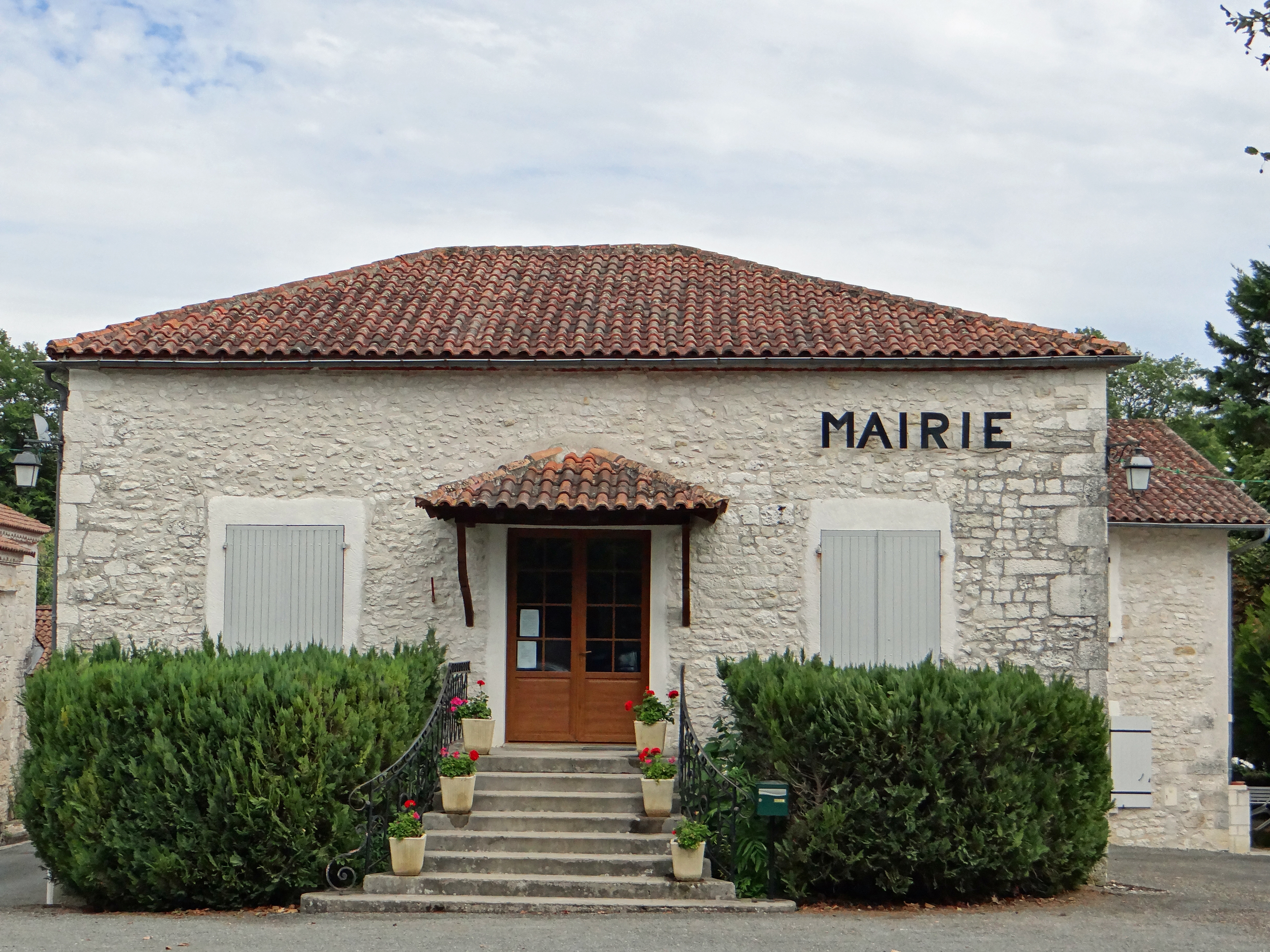
- Masquières Town hall
- Location of Masquières
- Location within France Location within Nouvelle-Aquitaine
- Coordinates: 44°24′29″N 1°03′16″E
- Country: France
- Region: Nouvelle-Aquitaine
- Department: Lot-et-Garonne
- Arrondissement: Villeneuve-sur-Lot
- Canton: Le Fumélois
- Intercommunality: Fumel Vallée du Lot

Government
  - Mayor (2020–2026): Thierry Bouquet
- Area^{1}: 12.31 km^{2} (4.75 sq mi)
- Elevation: 230 m (750 ft)
- Highest elevation: 263 m (863 ft)
- Lowest elevation: 149 m (489 ft)
- Population (2023): 171
  - Density: 13.9/km^{2} (36.0/sq mi)
- Time zone: UTC+01:00 (CET)
  - Summer (DST): UTC+02:00 (CEST)
- INSEE/Postal code: 47160 /47370
- ^{1} French Land Register data, which excludes lakes, ponds, glaciers > 1 km^{2} (0.386 sq mi or 247 acres) and river estuaries.

Masquières (French pronunciation: [maskjɛʁ]; Occitan: Masquièras) is a commune in the Lot-et-Garonne department in south-western France.

== See also ==
- Communes of the Lot-et-Garonne department
