= Lacapelle-Biron =

- Commune
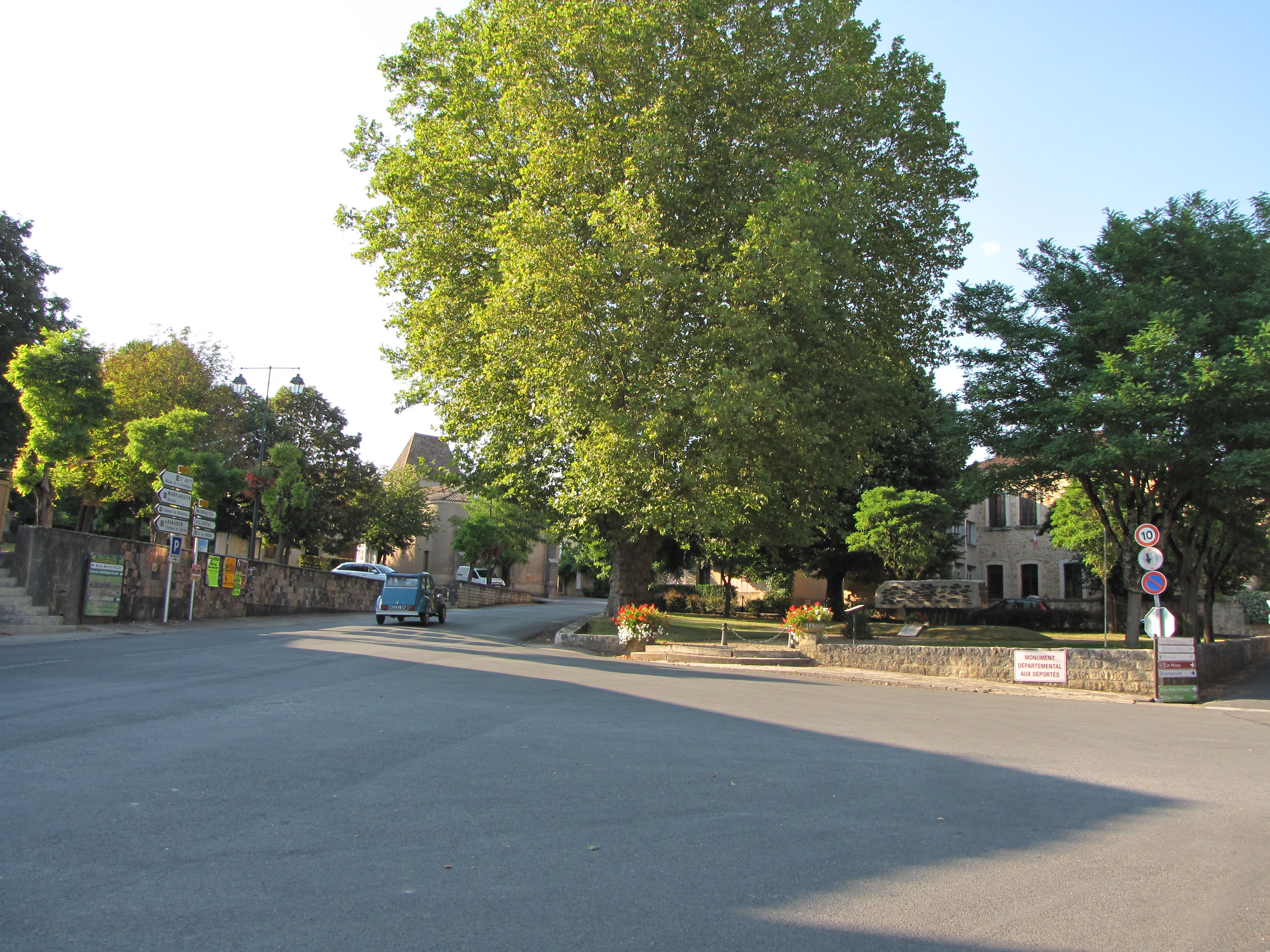
- The main square in Lacapelle-Biron

- Coat of arms
- Location of Lacapelle-Biron
- Location within France Location within Nouvelle-Aquitaine
- Coordinates: 44°36′04″N 0°53′48″E
- Country: France
- Region: Nouvelle-Aquitaine
- Department: Lot-et-Garonne
- Arrondissement: Villeneuve-sur-Lot
- Canton: Le Fumélois
- Intercommunality: Fumel Vallée du Lot

Government
  - Mayor (2020–2026): Nadine Lafon
- Area^{1}: 13.96 km^{2} (5.39 sq mi)
- Elevation: 150 m (490 ft)
- Highest elevation: 243 m (797 ft)
- Lowest elevation: 145 m (476 ft)
- Population (2023): 391
  - Density: 28.0/km^{2} (72.5/sq mi)
- Time zone: UTC+01:00 (CET)
  - Summer (DST): UTC+02:00 (CEST)
- INSEE/Postal code: 47123 /47150
- ^{1} French Land Register data, which excludes lakes, ponds, glaciers > 1 km^{2} (0.386 sq mi or 247 acres) and river estuaries.

Lacapelle-Biron (French pronunciation: [lakapɛl biʁɔ̃]; Occitan: La Capèla Biron) is a commune in the Lot-et-Garonne department in south-western France.

== See also ==
- Communes of the Lot-et-Garonne department
