= Courbiac =

- Commune
- Location of Courbiac
- Location within France Location within Nouvelle-Aquitaine
- Coordinates: 44°22′42″N 1°02′24″E
- Country: France
- Region: Nouvelle-Aquitaine
- Department: Lot-et-Garonne
- Arrondissement: Villeneuve-sur-Lot
- Canton: Le Fumélois
- Intercommunality: Fumel Vallée du Lot

Government
  - Mayor (2020–2026): José Le Corre
- Area^{1}: 9.05 km^{2} (3.49 sq mi)
- Elevation: 100 m (330 ft)
- Highest elevation: 272 m (892 ft)
- Lowest elevation: 136 m (446 ft)
- Population (2023): 106
  - Density: 11.7/km^{2} (30.3/sq mi)
- Time zone: UTC+01:00 (CET)
  - Summer (DST): UTC+02:00 (CEST)
- INSEE/Postal code: 47072 /47370
- ^{1} French Land Register data, which excludes lakes, ponds, glaciers > 1 km^{2} (0.386 sq mi or 247 acres) and river estuaries.

Courbiac (French pronunciation: [kuʁbjak]; Occitan: Corbiac) is a commune in the Lot-et-Garonne department in south-western France. It is located 30 km east of Villeneuve-sur-Lot.

== See also ==
- Communes of the Lot-et-Garonne department
