= Montayral =

- Commune
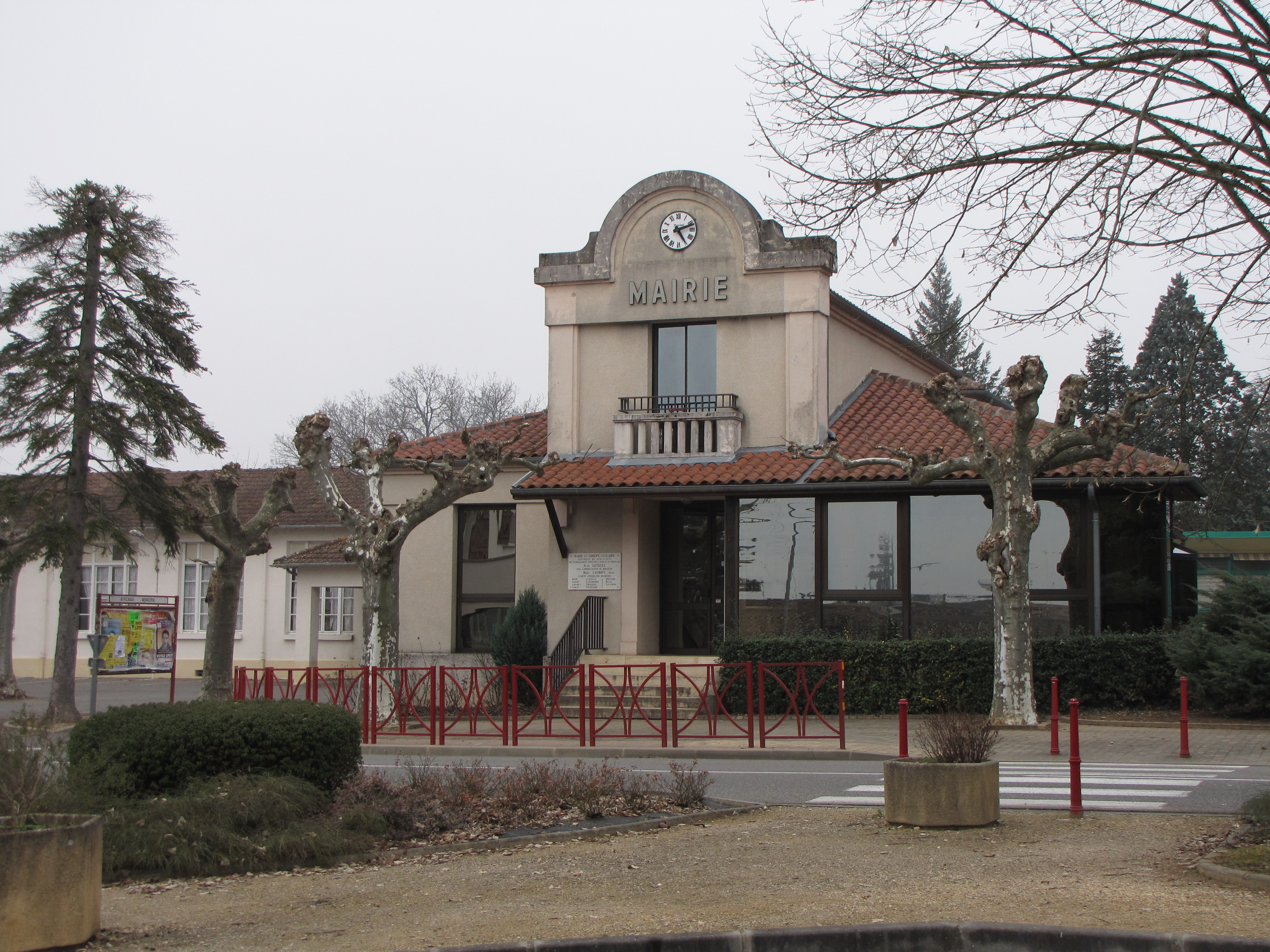
- The town hall in Montayral
- Location of Montayral
- Location within France Location within Nouvelle-Aquitaine
- Coordinates: 44°28′49″N 0°59′17″E
- Country: France
- Region: Nouvelle-Aquitaine
- Department: Lot-et-Garonne
- Arrondissement: Villeneuve-sur-Lot
- Canton: Le Fumélois
- Intercommunality: Fumel Vallée du Lot

Government
  - Mayor (2020–2026): Jean-François Ségala
- Area^{1}: 24.54 km^{2} (9.47 sq mi)
- Elevation: 90 m (300 ft)
- Highest elevation: 227 m (745 ft)
- Lowest elevation: 57 m (187 ft)
- Population (2023): 2,654
  - Density: 108.1/km^{2} (280.1/sq mi)
- Time zone: UTC+01:00 (CET)
  - Summer (DST): UTC+02:00 (CEST)
- INSEE/Postal code: 47185 /47500
- ^{1} French Land Register data, which excludes lakes, ponds, glaciers > 1 km^{2} (0.386 sq mi or 247 acres) and river estuaries.

Montayral (French pronunciation: [mɔ̃teʁal]; Occitan: Montairal) is a commune in the Lot-et-Garonne department in south-western France.

== Population ==
Historical population
| Year | Pop. | ±% p.a. |
|---|---|---|
| 1968 | 2,557 | — |
| 1975 | 3,000 | +2.31% |
| 1982 | 3,200 | +0.93% |
| 1990 | 3,094 | −0.42% |
| 1999 | 2,936 | −0.58% |
| 2007 | 2,986 | +0.21% |
| 2012 | 2,807 | −1.23% |
| 2017 | 2,680 | −0.92% |
| 2023 | 2,654 | −0.16% |
Source: INSEE

== See also ==
- Communes of the Lot-et-Garonne department
