= Arrondissements of the Lot-et-Garonne department =

Administrative divisions of Lot-et-Garonne, France

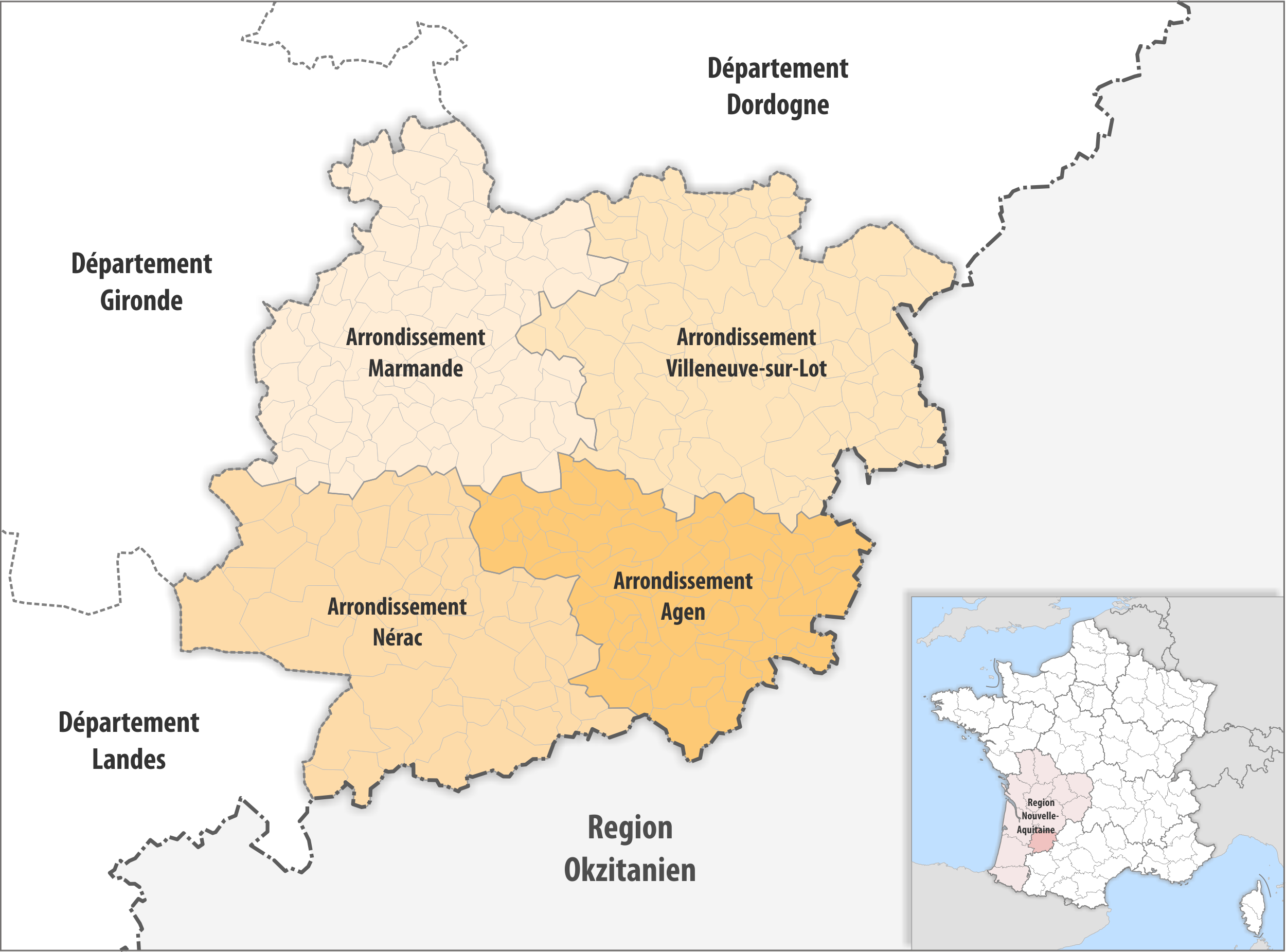
Map of arrondissements of the Lot-et-Garonne department.

The 4 arrondissements of the Lot-et-Garonne department are:

1. Arrondissement of Agen, (prefecture of the Lot-et-Garonne department: Agen) with 71 communes. The population of the arrondissement was 119,948 in 2021.
2. Arrondissement of Marmande, (subprefecture: Marmande) with 98 communes. The population of the arrondissement was 83,657 in 2021.
3. Arrondissement of Nérac, (subprefecture: Nérac) with 58 communes. The population of the arrondissement was 38,342 in 2021.
4. Arrondissement of Villeneuve-sur-Lot, (subprefecture: Villeneuve-sur-Lot) with 92 communes. The population of the arrondissement was 89,282 in 2021.

== History ==
In 1800 the arrondissements of Agen, Marmande, Nérac and Villeneuve-sur-Lot were established. The arrondissement of Nérac was abolished in 1926, and recreated in 1942.
