= Monsempron-Libos =

- Commune
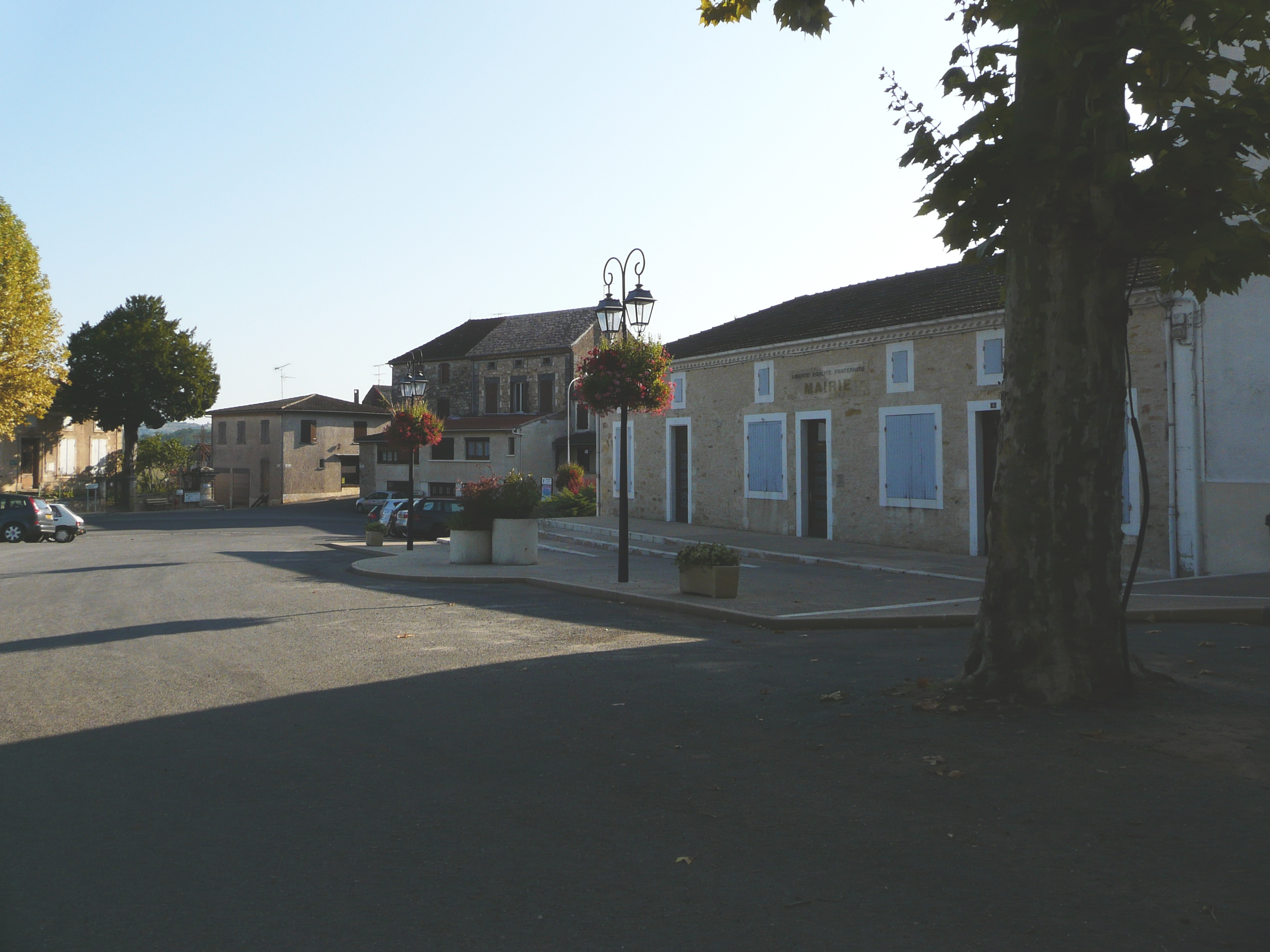
- The town hall in Monsempron-Libos

- Coat of arms
- Location of Monsempron-Libos
- Location within France Location within Nouvelle-Aquitaine
- Coordinates: 44°28′58″N 0°56′39″E
- Country: France
- Region: Nouvelle-Aquitaine
- Department: Lot-et-Garonne
- Arrondissement: Villeneuve-sur-Lot
- Canton: Le Fumélois
- Intercommunality: Fumel Vallée du Lot

Government
  - Mayor (2020–2026): Jean-Jacques Brouillet
- Area^{1}: 9.05 km^{2} (3.49 sq mi)
- Elevation: 116 m (381 ft)
- Highest elevation: 155 m (509 ft)
- Lowest elevation: 59 m (194 ft)
- Population (2023): 2,122
  - Density: 234/km^{2} (607/sq mi)
- Time zone: UTC+01:00 (CET)
  - Summer (DST): UTC+02:00 (CEST)
- INSEE/Postal code: 47179 /47500
- ^{1} French Land Register data, which excludes lakes, ponds, glaciers > 1 km^{2} (0.386 sq mi or 247 acres) and river estuaries.

Monsempron-Libos (French pronunciation: [mɔ̃sɑ̃pʁɔ̃ libɔs]; Occitan: Montsempronh e Libòs) is a commune in the Lot-et-Garonne department in south-western France. Monsempron-Libos station has rail connections to Périgueux and Agen.

== Population ==
Historical population
Year	Pop.	±% p.a.
1968	2,654	—
1975	3,018	+1.85%
1982	2,697	−1.59%
1990	2,423	−1.33%
1999	2,135	−1.40%
2007	2,077	−0.34%
2012	2,049	−0.27%
2017	2,091	+0.41%
2023	2,122	+0.25%
Source: INSEE

== See also ==
- Communes of the Lot-et-Garonne department
