= Cantons of the Lot-et-Garonne department =

The following is a list of the 21 cantons of the Lot-et-Garonne department, in France, following the French canton reorganisation which came into effect in March 2015:

- Agen-1
- Agen-2
- Agen-3
- Agen-4
- L'Albret
- Le Confluent
- Les Coteaux de Guyenne
- Les Forêts de Gascogne
- Le Fumélois
- Le Haut agenais Périgord
- Lavardac
- Le Livradais
- Marmande-1
- Marmande-2
- L'Ouest agenais
- Le Pays de Serres
- Le Sud-Est agenais
- Tonneins
- Le Val du Dropt
- Villeneuve-sur-Lot-1
- Villeneuve-sur-Lot-2
