= Anthé =

- Commune
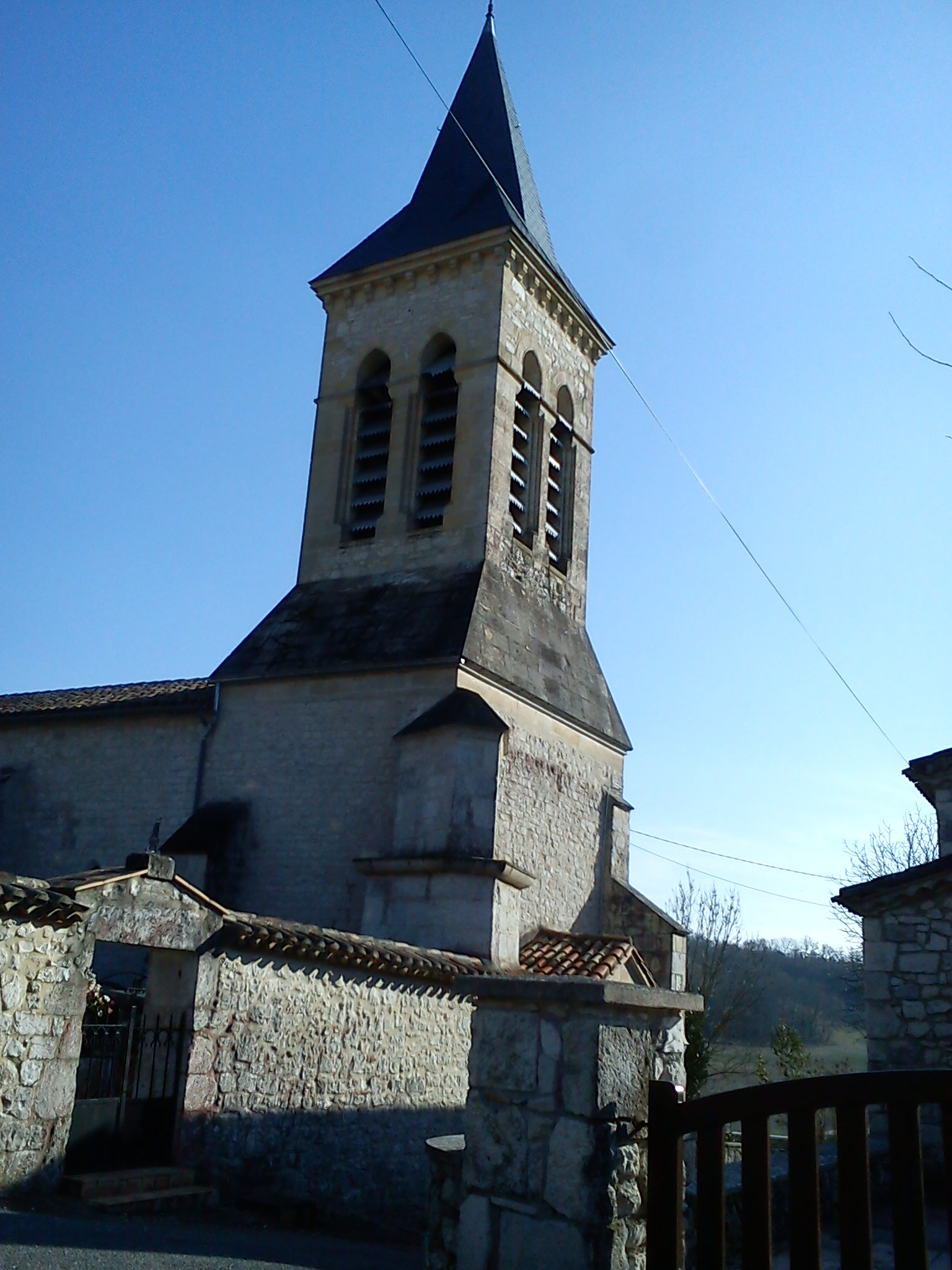
- The church in Anthé
- Location of Anthé
- Location within France Location within Nouvelle-Aquitaine
- Coordinates: 44°22′21″N 0°57′38″E
- Country: France
- Region: Nouvelle-Aquitaine
- Department: Lot-et-Garonne
- Arrondissement: Villeneuve-sur-Lot
- Canton: Le Fumélois

Government
  - Mayor (2020–2026): Pierre Allemand
- Area^{1}: 13.93 km^{2} (5.38 sq mi)
- Elevation: 110 m (360 ft)
- Highest elevation: 252 m (827 ft)
- Lowest elevation: 92 m (302 ft)
- Population (2023): 194
  - Density: 13.9/km^{2} (36.1/sq mi)
- Time zone: UTC+01:00 (CET)
  - Summer (DST): UTC+02:00 (CEST)
- INSEE/Postal code: 47011 /47370
- ^{1} French Land Register data, which excludes lakes, ponds, glaciers > 1 km^{2} (0.386 sq mi or 247 acres) and river estuaries.

Anthé (French pronunciation: [ɑ̃te]; Occitan: Ante) is a commune in the Lot-et-Garonne department in southwestern France.

== Population ==
Historical population
Year	Pop.	±% p.a.
1968	235	—
1975	203	−2.07%
1982	218	+1.02%
1990	202	−0.95%
1999	208	+0.33%
2007	208	+0.00%
2012	192	−1.59%
2017	201	+0.92%
2023	194	−0.59%
Source: INSEE

== See also ==
- Communes of the Lot-et-Garonne department
