= Paul Chollet =

French pediatrician and politician (1928–2022)

Mayor of Agen
- In office 25 March 1989 – March 2001
- Preceded by: Georges Ricci
- Succeeded by: Alain Veyret

Deputy of the French National Assembly
- In office 2 April 1986 – 21 April 1997
- Preceded by: Christian Laurissergues (indirectly)
- Succeeded by: Alain Veyret
- Constituency: Proportional representation (1986–1988); Lot-et-Garonne's 1st constituency (1988–1997)

Member of the General Council of Lot-et-Garonne
- In office 1981–1989
- Preceded by: Pierre Esquirol
- Succeeded by: Philippe Lacaze
- Constituency: Canton of Agen-Centre

Member of the Regional Council of Aquitaine
- In office 16 March 1986 – 18 June 2001

Personal details
- Born: 10 April 1928 Savignac-de-Duras, France
- Died: 13 December 2022 (aged 94) Agen, France
- Party: UDF
- Education: University of Toulouse
- Occupation: Pediatrician

Paul Chollet (10 April 1928 – 13 December 2022) was a French paediatrician and politician of the Union for French Democracy. He served as Mayor of Agen from 1989 to 2001 and was a deputy of the National Assembly from 1986 to 1997.

== Biography ==
Chollet graduated from the Faculty of Medicine at the University of Toulouse and worked as a pediatrician between Bordeaux and Toulouse in the 1960s. He founded the first Centre d'action médico-sociale précoce and Centre médico-psycho-pédagogique in Agen. He also founded the local branch of UNICEF.

Chollet began his political career as a municipal councillor in Agen in 1977. Four years later, he became deputy mayor and became General Councilor of the Canton of Agen-Centre in 1981. He was elected mayor of Agen in 1989 and resigned as General Councilor due to the law prohibiting certain dual mandates. He was president of the Amicale des maires de Lot-et-Garonne from 1989 to 2001.

In 1986, Chollet was elected to the National Assembly, representing Lot-et-Garonne through proportional representation. He was re-elected in 1988 in Lot-et-Garonne's 1st constituency, and re-elected again in 1993. He remained in office until 21 April 1997.

Paul Chollet died in Agen on 13 December 2022, at the age of 94.
