= Lot-et-Garonne's 1st constituency =

Constituency of the National Assembly of France

1st constituency of Lot-et-Garonne
- inline Constituency of the National Assembly of France

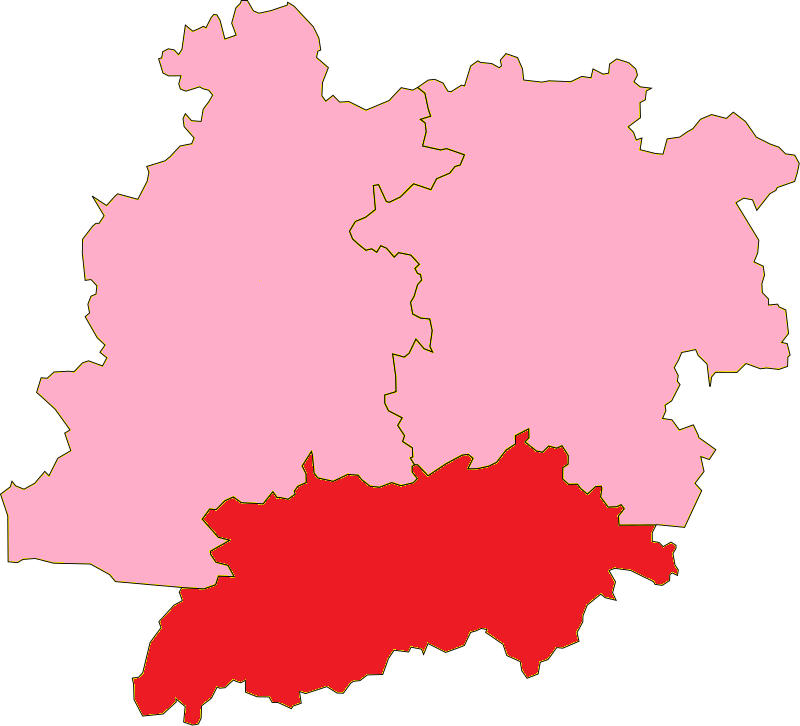
- Lot-et-Garonne's 1st Constituency shown within Lot-et-Garonne
- Deputy: Michel Lauzzana; RE
- Department: Lot-et-Garonne
- Cantons: Agen-Centre, Agen-Nord, Agen-Nord-Est, Agen-Sud-Est, Agen-Ouest, Astaffort, Francescas, Laplume, Lavardac, Mézin, Nérac, Puymirol
- Registered voters: 88182

The 1st constituency of Lot-et-Garonne (French: Première circonscription de Lot-et-Garonne) is a French legislative constituency in the Lot-et-Garonne département. Like the other 576 French constituencies, it elects one MP using a two round electoral system.

== Description ==
The 1st Constituency of Lot-et-Garonne lies in the south of the département around the small city of Agen on the Garonne river. Politically the seat had swung between the centre-right Union for French Democracy and the Socialist Party, this changed in 2017 when, along with the other two seats in Lot-et-Garonne it fell to En Marche.

== Assembly members ==
Election	Member	Party
1988	Paul Chollet	UDF
1993	Paul Chollet	UDF
1997	Alain Veyret	PS
2002	Jean Dionis du Séjour	UDF
2007	Jean Dionis du Séjour	UDF
2012	Lucette Lousteau	PS
2017	Michel Lauzzana	LREM
2022	Michel Lauzzana	RE
2024	Michel Lauzzana	RE

== Election results ==
=== 2024 ===
Candidate	Party	Alliance	First round		Second round	
Candidate	Party	Alliance	Votes	%	Votes	%
Michel Lauzzana	REN	Ensemble	17,155	28.41	30,952	52.32
Sébastien Delbosq	RN		26,034	43.11	28,208	47.68
Paul Vo Van	ECO	NPF	15,479	25.63		
Patrice Cuquel	REG		1,021	1.69		
Mohamed El Marbati	LO		700	1.16		
Valid votes			60,389	96.34	59,160	93.89
Blank votes			1,456	2.32	2,877	4.25
Null votes			841	1.34	1,171	1.86
Turnout			62,686	70.79	63,008	71.15
Abstentions			25,872	29.21	25,544	28.85
Registered voters			88,558		88,552	
Result			REN HOLD			

=== 2022 ===
Legislative Election 2022: Lot-et-Garonne's 1st constituency
Party	Candidate	Votes	%	±%
LREM (Ensemble)	Michel Lauzzana	13,309	29.64	-2.98
RN	Sébastien Delbosq	12,514	27.87	+12.13
EELV (NUPÉS)	Maryse Combres*	11,772	26.21	+3.28
LR (UDC)	Bertrand Girardi	2,542	5.66	−13.99
REC	Marie Line Bruyeres	2,220	4.94	N/A
DLF (UPF)	Benoit Aurices	1,051	2.34	N/A
PA	Sophie Rambourg	899	2.00	N/A
LO	Mohamed El Marbati	600	1.34	N/A
Turnout		44,907	52.37	+0.77
2nd round result
LREM (Ensemble)	Michel Lauzzana	20,328	51.48	-5.37
RN	Sébastien Delbosq	19,163	48.52	N/A
Turnout		39,491	49.71	+10.54
LREM hold				

* Withdrew before the 2nd round

=== 2017 ===
Legislative Election 2017: Lot-et-Garonne's 1st constituency
Party	Candidate	Votes	%	±%
LREM	Michel Lauzzana	14,846	32.62	
UDI	Jean Dionis du Séjour	8,940	19.65	
FN	Catherine Lesne	7,164	15.74	
LFI	Céline Boussié	5,232	11.50	
PS	Lucette Lousteau	3,632	7.98	
EELV	Maryse Combres	1,572	3.45	
DVD	Muriel Boulmier	1,448	3.18	
DLF	Benoît Aurices	968	2.13	
Others	N/A	1,703		
Turnout		45,505	51.60	
2nd round result
LREM	Michel Lauzzana	19,635	56.85	
UDI	Jean Dionis du Séjour	14,903	43.15	
Turnout		34,538	39.17	
LREM gain from PS				

=== 2012 ===
Legislative Election 2012: Lot-et-Garonne's 1st constituency
Party	Candidate	Votes	%	±%
NM	Jean Dionis du Séjour	14,606	27.65	
PS	Lucette Lousteau	10,844	20.53	
DVG	Alain Veyret	8,794	16.65	
FN	Hélène Collet	8,507	16.10	
UMP	Christine Bonfanti-Dossat	3,383	6.40	
FG	Patrice Dufau	3,345	6.33	
EELV	Maryse Combres	1,390	2.63	
MoDem	Bruno Dubos	1,158	2.19	
Others	N/A	805		
Turnout		52,832	60.91	
2nd round result
PS	Lucette Lousteau	27,189	52.02	
NM	Jean Dionis du Séjour	25,077	47.98	
Turnout		52,266	60.26	
PS gain from NM				
