= Canton of Le Fumélois =

Coordinates: 44.50°N 0.97°E

The canton of Le Fumélois is an administrative division of the Lot-et-Garonne department, southwestern France. It was created at the French canton reorganisation which came into effect in March 2015. Its seat is in Fumel.

It consists of the following communes:

1. Anthé
2. Blanquefort-sur-Briolance
3. Bourlens
4. Cazideroque
5. Condezaygues
6. Courbiac
7. Cuzorn
8. Fumel
9. Lacapelle-Biron
10. Masquières
11. Monsempron-Libos
12. Montayral
13. Saint-Front-sur-Lémance
14. Saint-Georges
15. Saint-Vite
16. Sauveterre-la-Lémance
17. Thézac
18. Tournon-d'Agenais
19. Trentels
