= Michel Lauzzana =

French politician

Michel Lauzzana (born 20 March 1957 in Castelsarrasin) is a French politician representing La République En Marche! He was elected to the French National Assembly on 18 June 2017, representing the department of Lot-et-Garonne.

== See also ==
- 2017 French legislative election
