= Lot-et-Garonne =

Department in Nouvelle-Aquitaine, France

Lot-et-Garonne Òlt e Garona (Occitan)
- Department of France
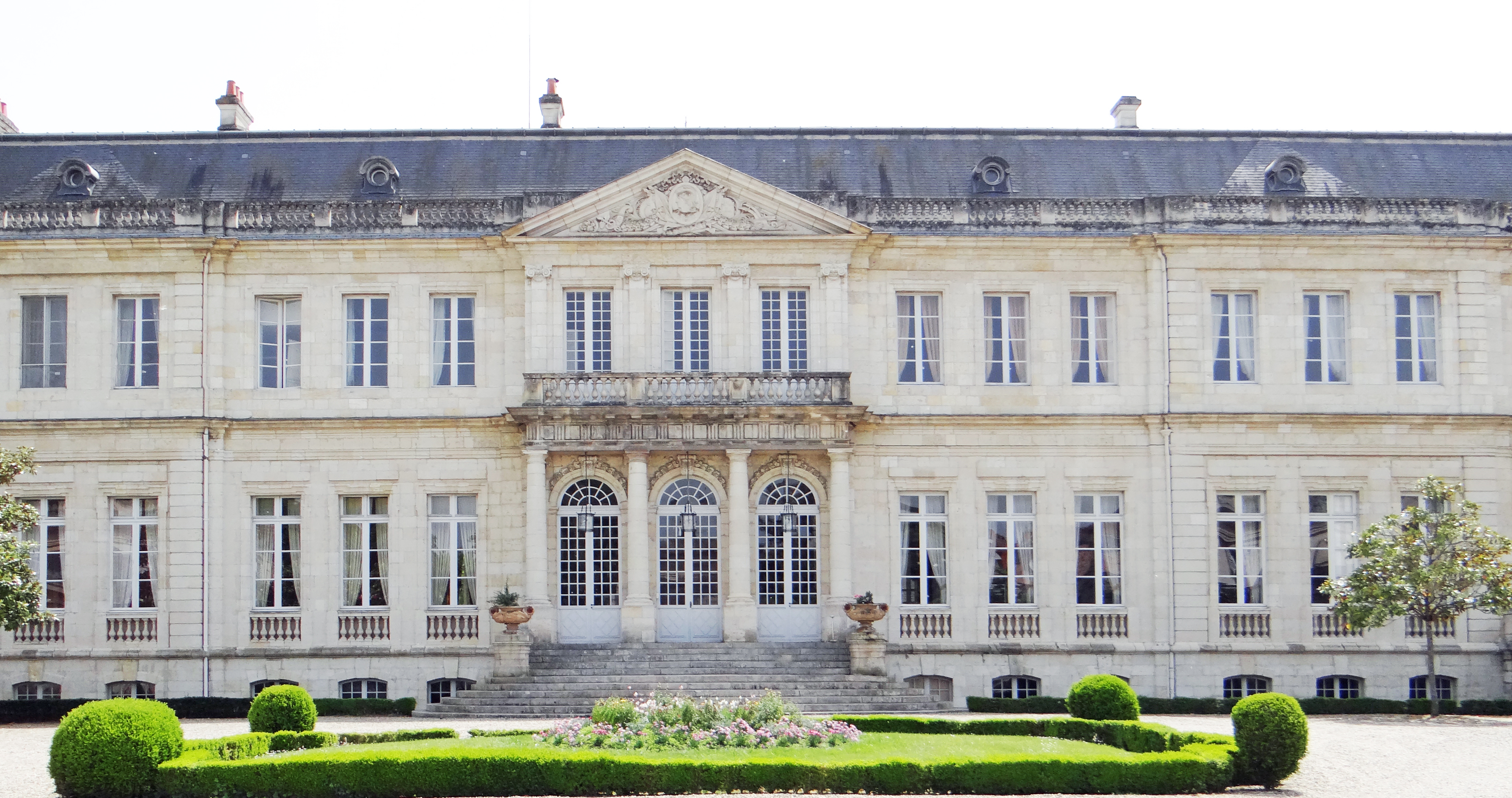
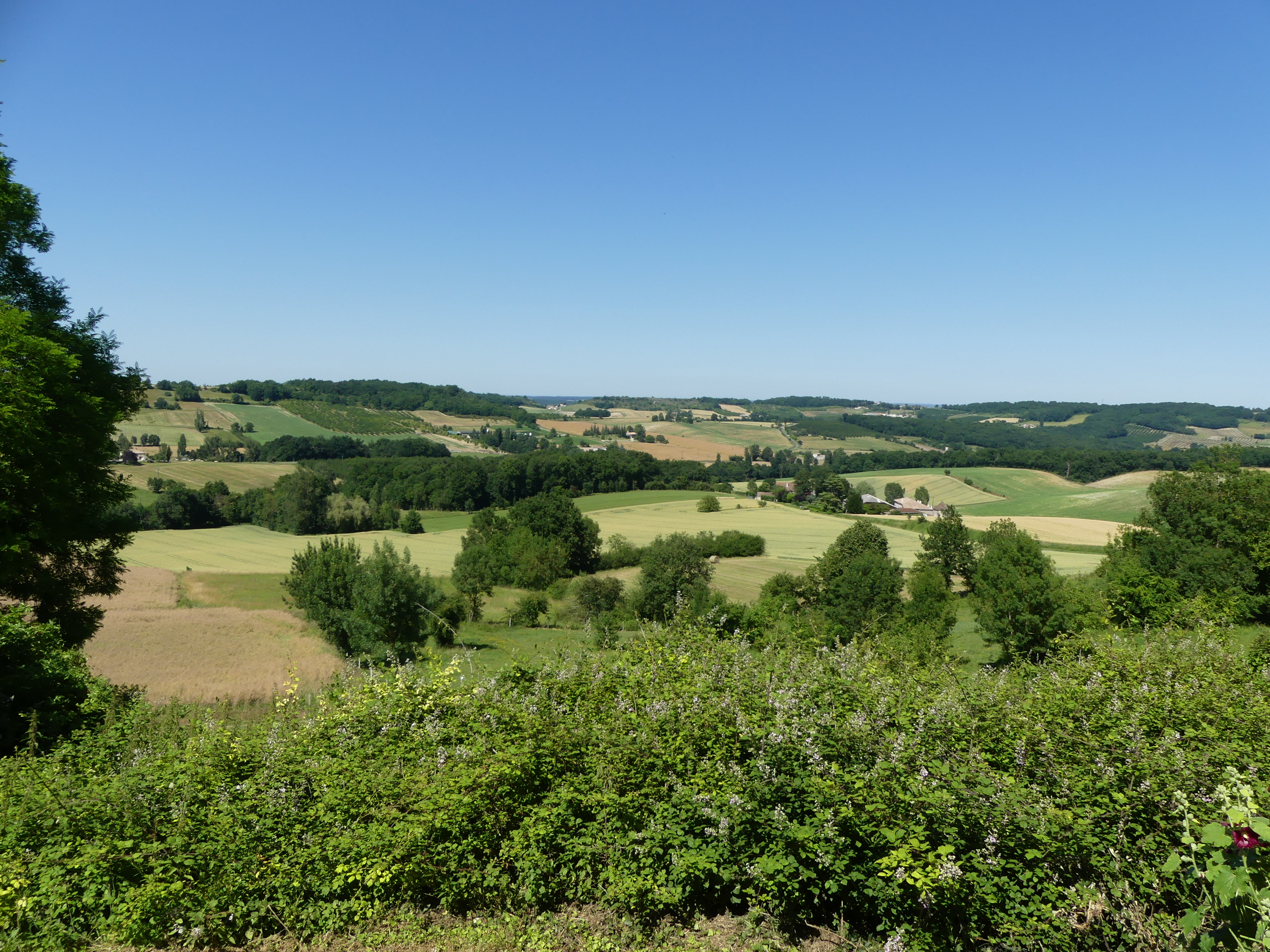
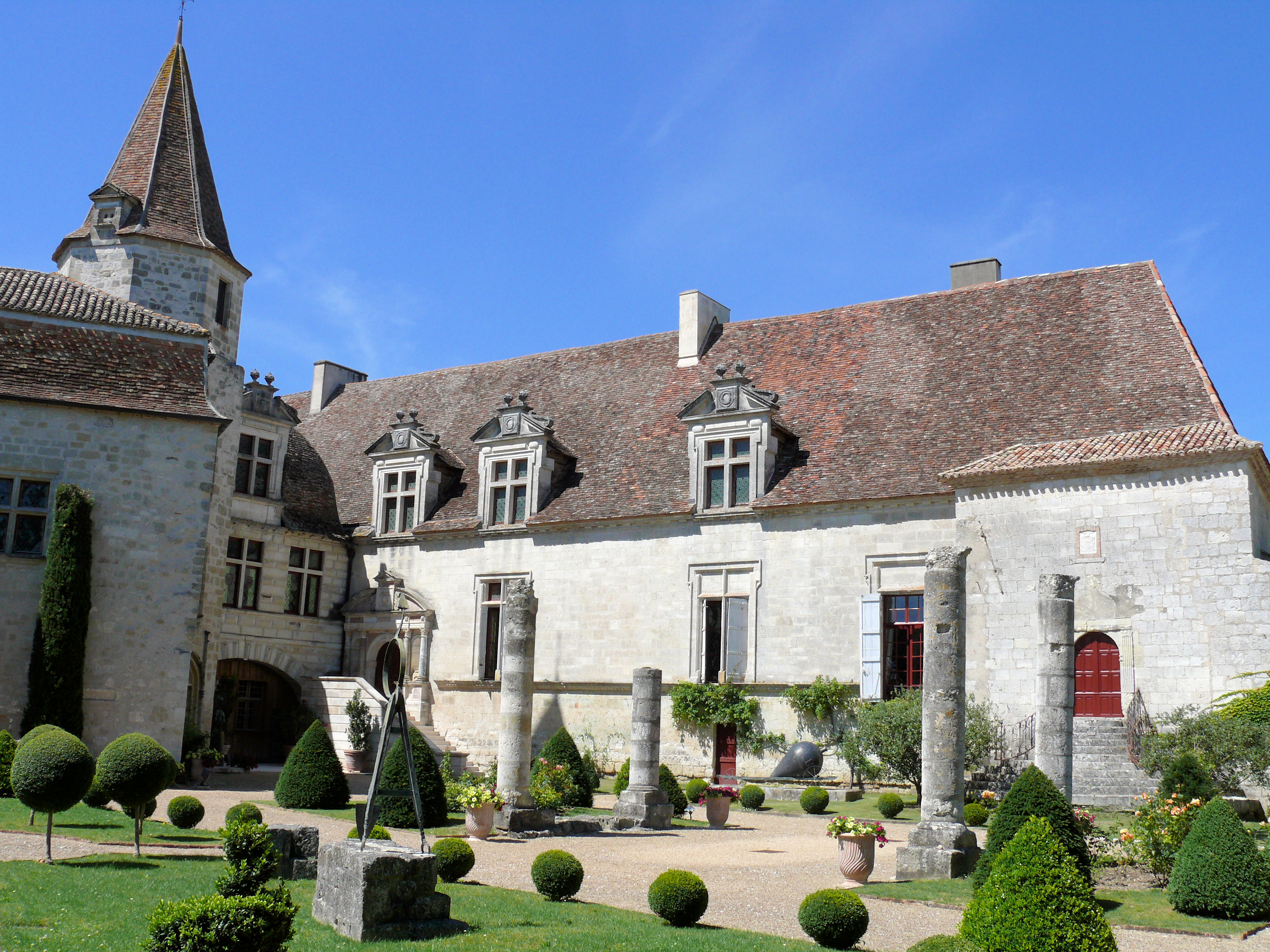
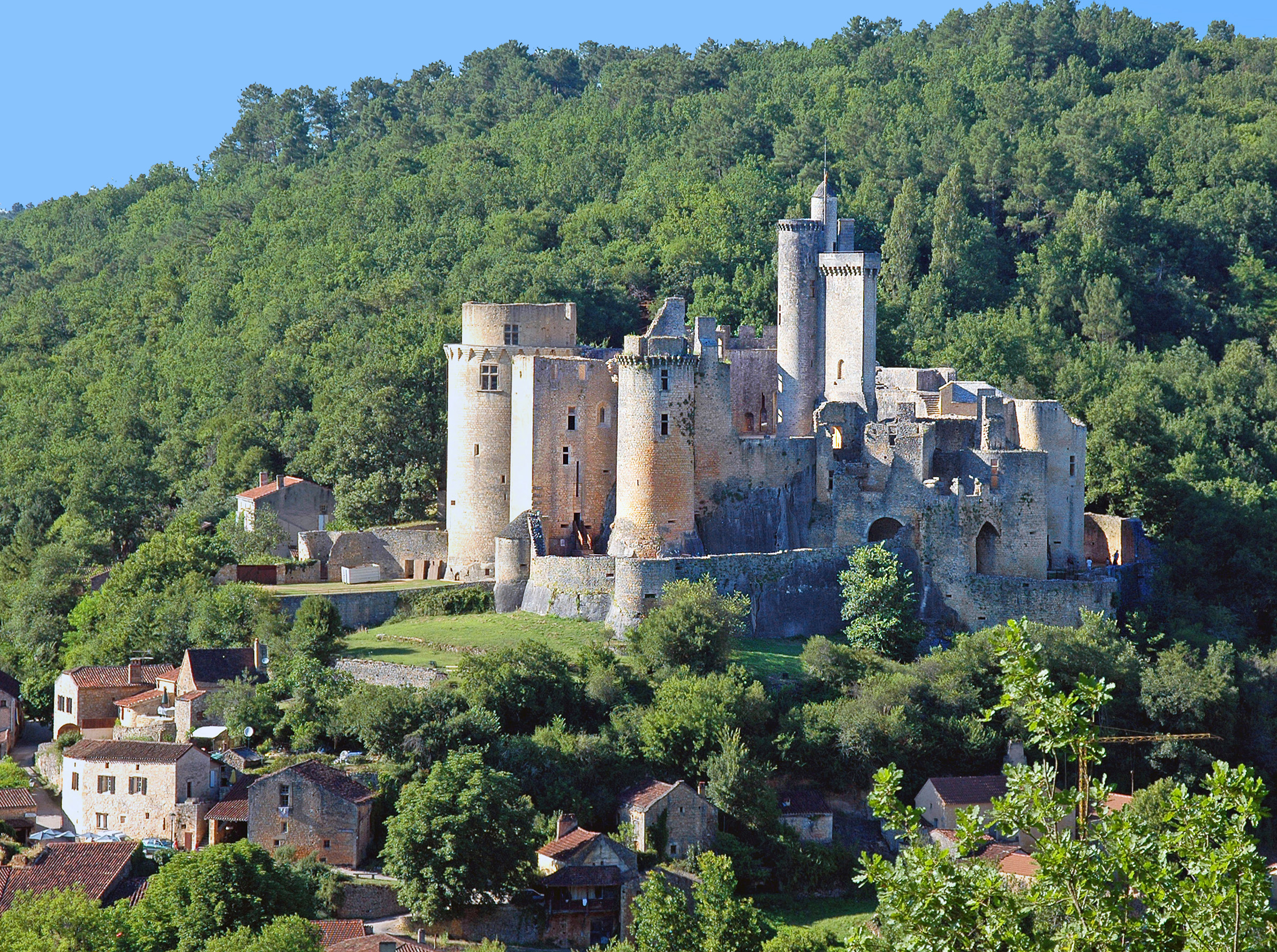
- Top down, from left to right: prefecture building in Agen, Castelnaud-de-Gratecambe, Château de Lauzun and Château de Bonaguil

- Coat of arms

- Location of Lot-et-Garonne in France
- Coordinates: 44°20′N 0°30′E
- Country: France
- Region: Nouvelle-Aquitaine
- Prefecture: Agen
- Subprefectures: Marmande; Nérac; Villeneuve-sur-Lot

Government
  - President of the Departmental Council: Sophie Borderie (PS)

Area^{1}
  - Total: 5,361 km^{2} (2,070 sq mi)

Population (2023)
  - Total: 333,602
  - Rank: 71st
  - Density: 62.23/km^{2} (161.2/sq mi)
- Time zone: UTC+1 (CET)
  - Summer (DST): UTC+2 (CEST)
- ISO 3166 code: FR-47
- Department number: 47
- Arrondissements: 4
- Cantons: 21
- Communes: 319
- ^1 French Land Register data, which exclude estuaries and lakes, ponds and glaciers larger than 1 km^{2}

Lot-et-Garonne (French pronunciation: [lɔt e ɡaʁɔn], Occitan: Òlt e Garona; lit. 'Lot and Garonne') is a department in the Nouvelle-Aquitaine region of Southwestern France. Named after the rivers Lot and Garonne, it had a population of 333,602 in 2023. Its prefecture and largest city is Agen.

== History ==
Lot-et-Garonne is one of the original 83 departments created on 4 March 1790, as a result of the French Revolution. It was created from part of the province of Guyenne and Gascony; originally the territory of the ancient county of Agenais constituted nearly the whole.

The southeastern part of the original department (the former cantons of Auvillar, Montaigu-de-Quercy and Valence) was separated from it in 1808 to become a part of the newly created department of Tarn-et-Garonne.

== Geography ==
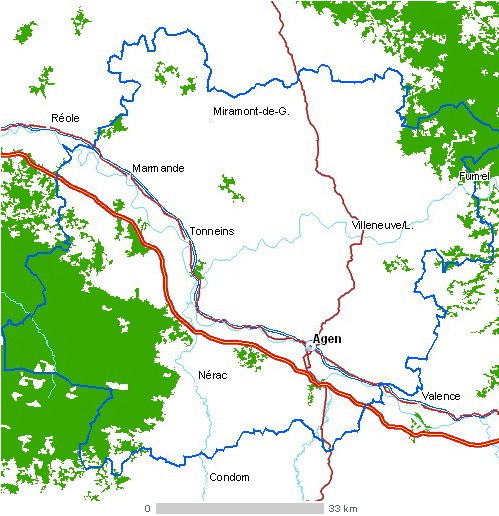
Map of Lot-et-Garonne

Lot-et-Garonne is part of the current region of Nouvelle-Aquitaine and is surrounded by the departments of Lot, Tarn-et-Garonne, Gers, Landes, Gironde, and Dordogne. The north of the department is composed of limestone hills. Between Lot and Garonne, there is a plateau carved by many valleys. In the west of the department, the Landes forest is planted in sand. It is composed of maritime pines. Between the forest and Agen, there is the Albret, a very hilly country.

=== Principal towns ===
The most populous commune is Agen, the prefecture. As of 2023, there are eight communes with more than 6,000 inhabitants:

Commune	Population (2023)
Agen	32,801
Villeneuve-sur-Lot	22,350
Marmande	17,328
Tonneins	9,459
Le Passage	9,326
Nérac	6,992
Sainte-Livrade-sur-Lot	6,541
Bon-Encontre	6,530

== Demographics ==
The inhabitants of the department are called Lot-et-Garonnais in French.

Population development since 1801:

Historical population

Year	Pop.	±% p.a.
1801	298,940	—
1806	327,444	+1.84%
1821	330,121	+0.05%
1831	346,885	+0.50%
1841	347,073	+0.01%
1851	341,345	−0.17%
1861	332,065	−0.28%
1872	319,289	−0.36%
1881	312,081	−0.25%
1891	295,360	−0.55%
1901	278,740	−0.58%
1911	268,083	−0.39%
1921	239,972	−1.10%
1931	247,500	+0.31%

Year	Pop.	±% p.a.
1936	252,761	+0.42%
1946	265,449	+0.49%
1954	265,549	+0.00%
1962	275,028	+0.44%
1968	290,592	+0.92%
1975	292,616	+0.10%
1982	298,522	+0.29%
1990	305,989	+0.31%
1999	305,380	−0.02%
2007	324,170	+0.75%
2012	332,119	+0.49%
2017	332,842	+0.04%
2023	333,602	+0.04%

== Politics ==
=== Departmental Council of Lot-et-Garonne ===
The Departmental Council of Lot-et-Garonne has 40 seats. In the 2015 departmental elections, the Socialist Party (PS) secured 25 seats while The Republicans (LR) won 15 seats. Sophie Borderie (PS) has presided over the assembly since 2019.

=== Members of the National Assembly ===
Lot-et-Garonne elected the following members of the National Assembly during the 2024 legislative election:

Constituency	Member	Party
Lot-et-Garonne's 1st constituency	Michel Lauzzana	Renaissance
Lot-et-Garonne's 2nd constituency	Hélène Laporte	National Rally
Lot-et-Garonne's 3rd constituency	Guillaume Lepers	The Republicans

== Economy ==
Food processing, chemicals, and pharmaceuticals are all major industries of the department.

== Tourism ==
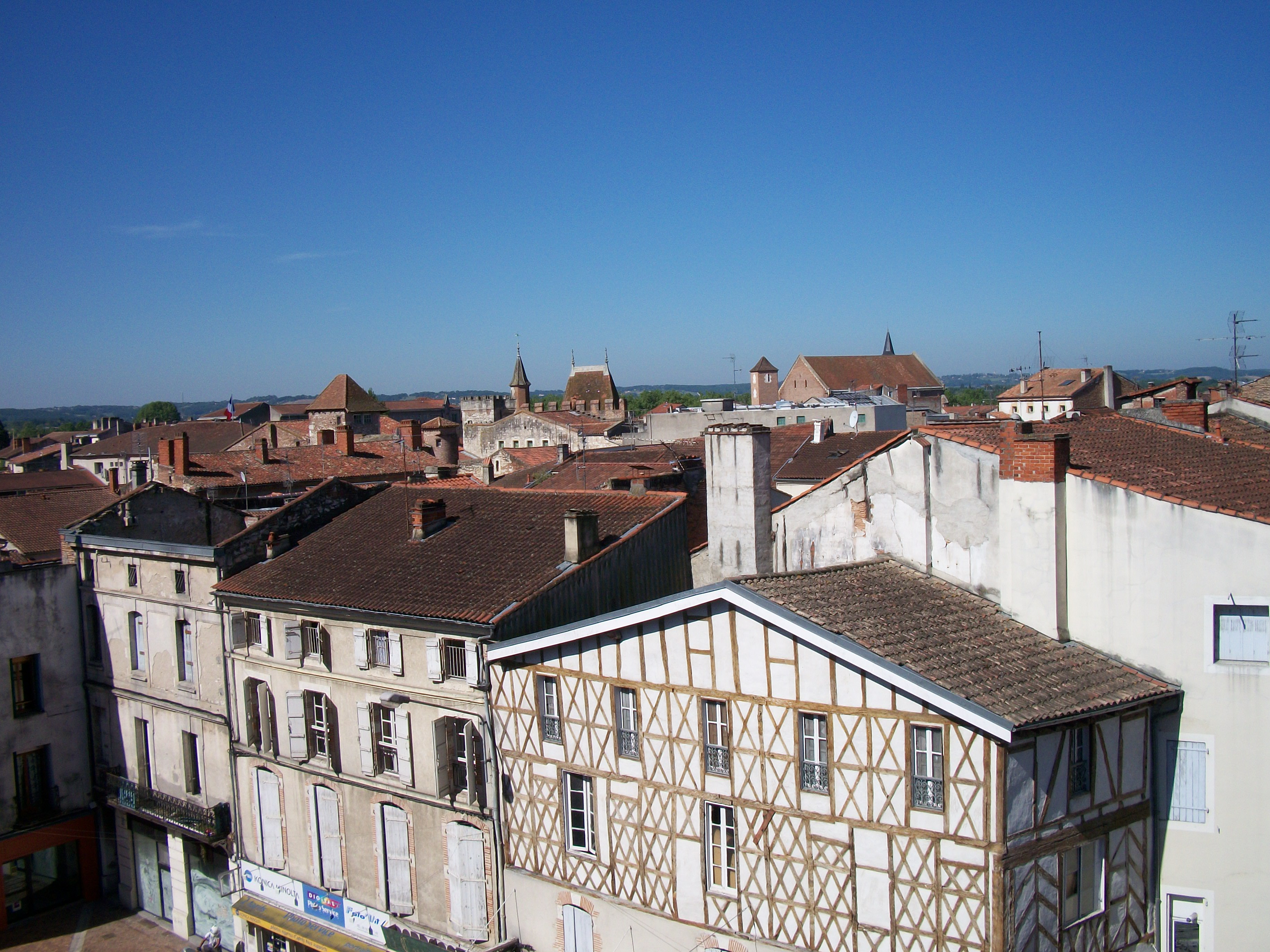
Agen

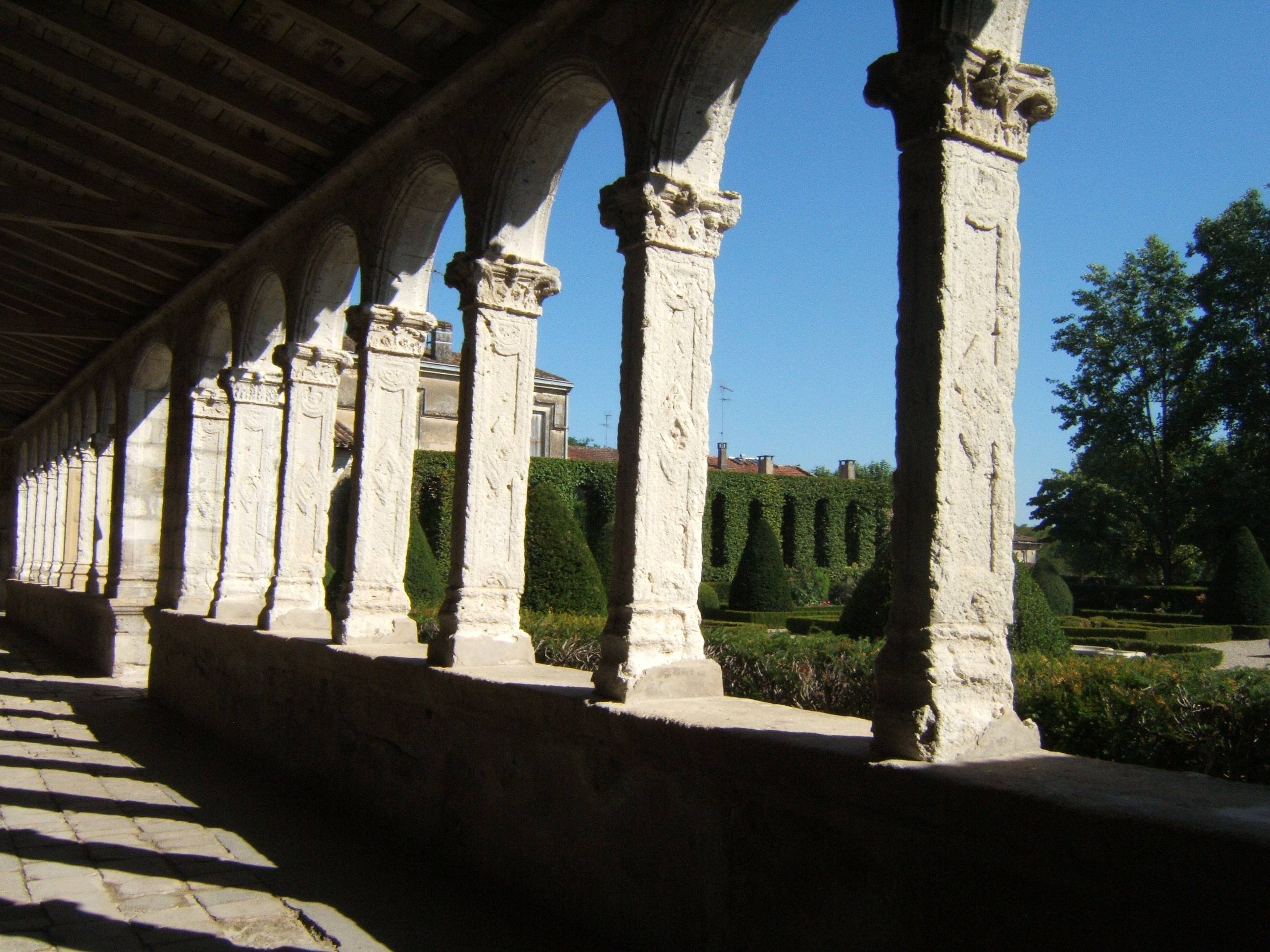
Marmande

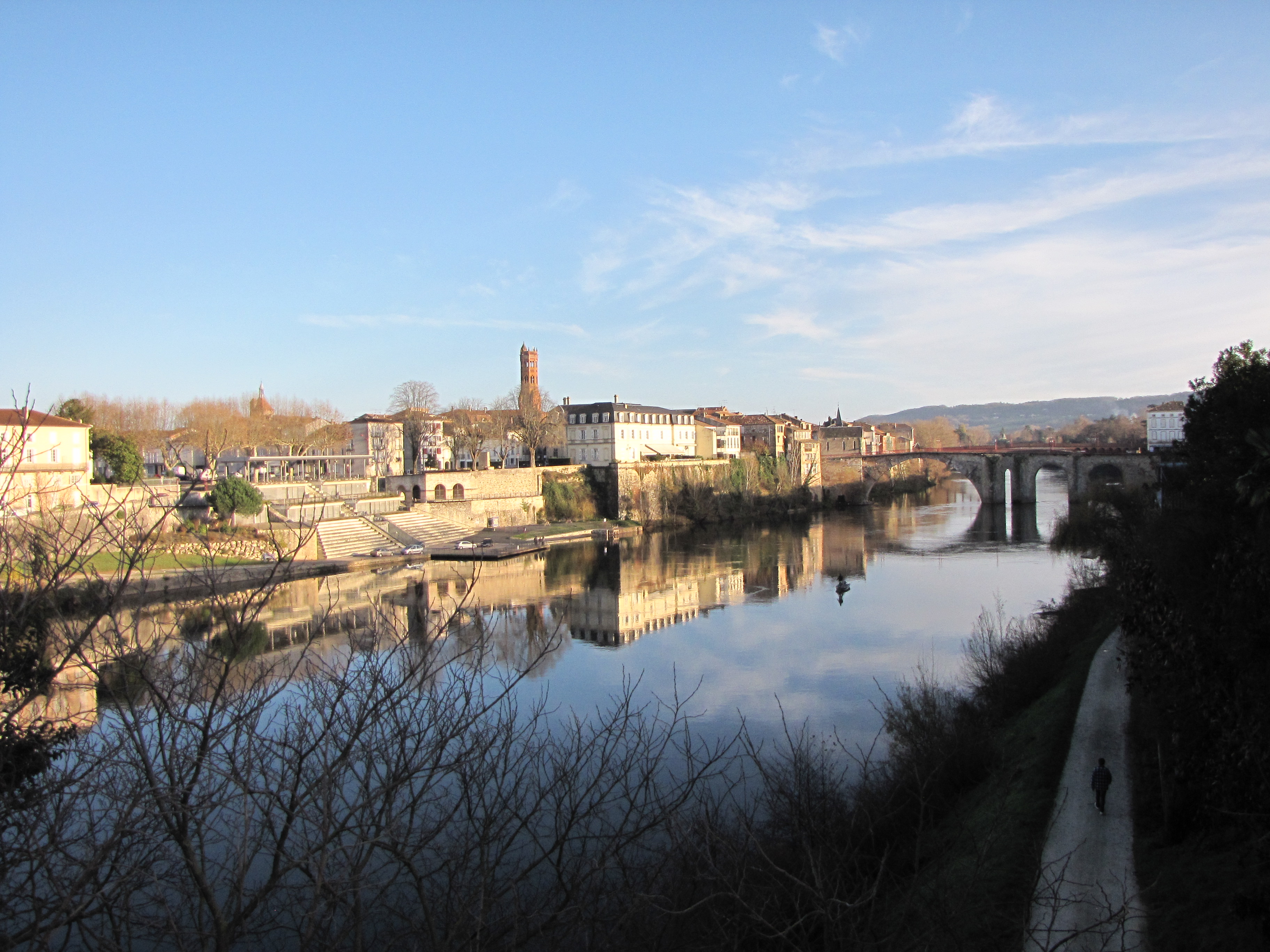
Villeneuve-sur-Lot

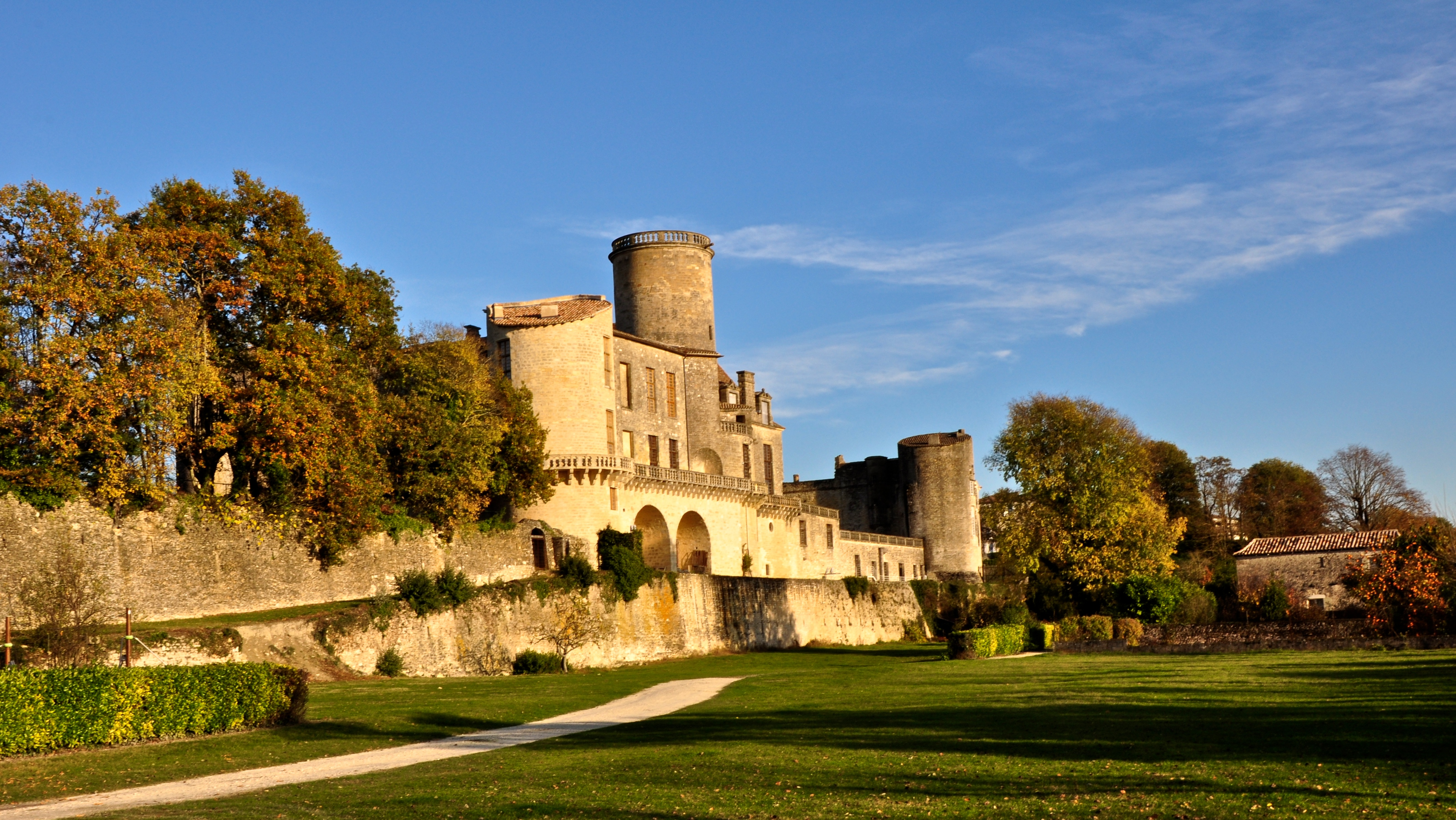
Duras

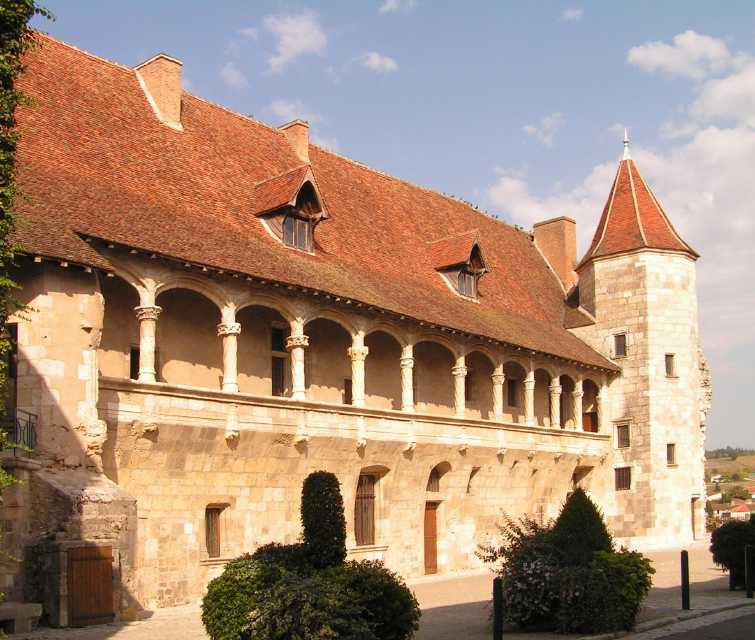
Nérac

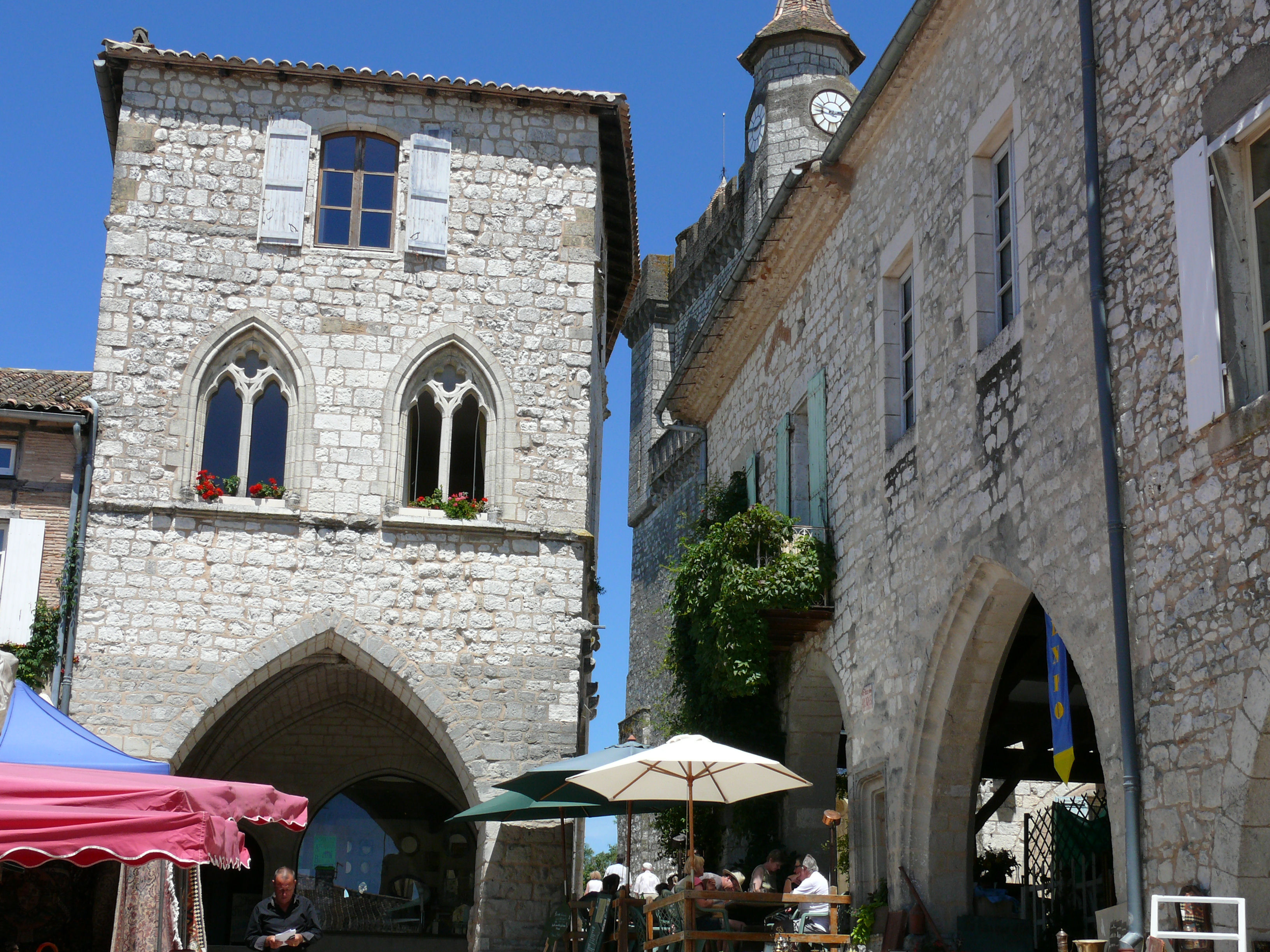
Monflanquin

== See also ==
- Cantons of the Lot-et-Garonne department
- Communes of the Lot-et-Garonne department
- Arrondissements of the Lot-et-Garonne department
- Roman Catholic Diocese of Agen
