= Meilan =

Meilan often refers to Meilan District, a district in Haikou, China.

Meilan may also refer to:

== People ==
- Zeng Meilan, Chinese rower
- José Luis Meilán Gil (1933-2018), Spanish politician
- Manuel Meilán Martínez (1933-2018), Promoter of Galicianism

== Meilan District ==
- Haikou Meilan International Airport, airport serving Haikou
- Meilan railway station, railway station of the Hainan Eastern Ring Railway that is connected to Haikou Meilan International Airport
- Haikou Meilan International Airport (company), former owner and operator of the Haikou Meilan International Airport

== Other ==
- Meilan Lake station railway station of the Shanghai Metro

== See also ==
- Mei Lan, a giant panda born at Zoo Atlanta in Atlanta, Georgia
- Melian (disambiguation)
- Meilhan (disambiguation)
- Meilin (disambiguation)
- Milan (disambiguation)
- Milan (given name)
- Milan (surname)
