= Rodolphe Roubet =

French politician (1895 – 1994)

President of the General Council of Lot-et-Garonne
- In office 1945–1949
- Preceded by: Office re-established
- Succeeded by: Doctor Toussaint

General councillor for the Canton of Tonneins
- In office 1945–1955
- Succeeded by: Jean Boué

Mayor of Clairac
- In office 1953–1959
- Preceded by: Adrien Vidal
- Succeeded by: Franck Bize

Mayor of Clairac
- In office 1944–1949
- Preceded by: Maurice Baril
- Succeeded by: Adrien Vidal

Mayor of Clairac
- In office 1929–1941
- Succeeded by: Maurice Baril

Personal details
- Born: 26 December 1895 Clairac, Lot-et-Garonne, France
- Died: 28 October 1994 (aged 98)
- Party: SFIO
- Occupation: Farmer
- Awards: Resistance Medal

Rodolphe Roubet (26 December 1895 – 28 October 1994) was a French farmer, member of the French Resistance and politician.

A farmer from a Protestant family in Lot-et-Garonne and a member of the French Section of the Workers' International (SFIO), he served as mayor of Clairac from 1929 to 1941, again from 1944 to 1949, and from 1953 to 1959. Removed from office by the Vichy regime in 1941, he became involved in the Socialist Resistance. He was arrested by the Milice in 1944, tortured and imprisoned at Eysses Prison, before being freed by the Maquis. He was subsequently awarded the Resistance Medal.

Following the Liberation of France, Roubet was elected general councillor for the Canton of Tonneins. In 1945 he became the first Socialist president of the General Council of Lot-et-Garonne, serving until 1949. He also chaired the departmental federation of tobacco growers until 1966.

== Early life ==
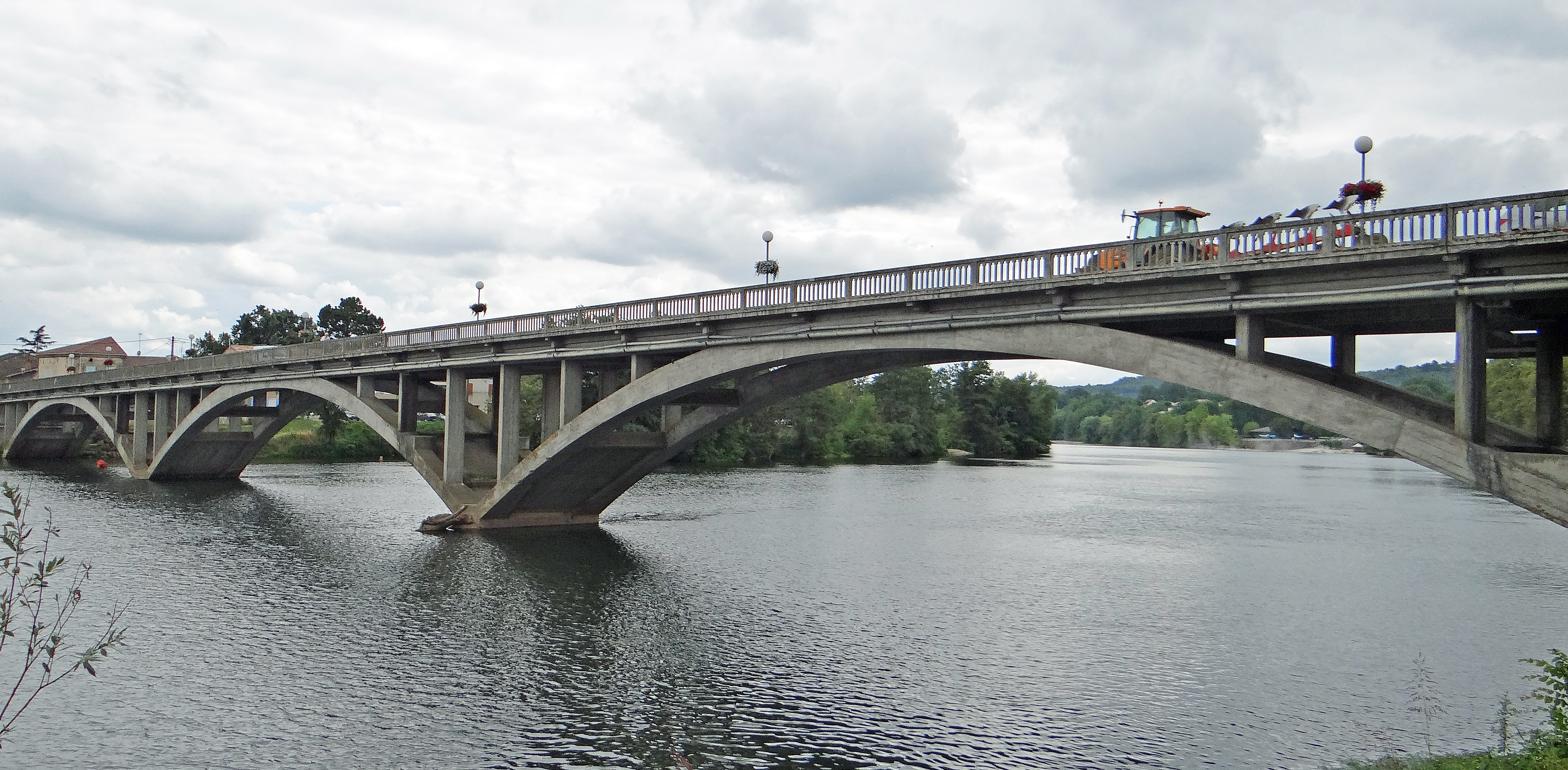
Clairac, on the banks of the Lot, Roubet's birthplace.

Rodolphe Roubet was born on 26 December 1895 at the Birac farm in Clairac, the only son of P. E. Roubet, a landowning farmer, and A. M. Demichel. His family belonged to the town's Reformed Protestant community.

He attended the secular school in Clairac and obtained his brevet élémentaire in June 1910, ranking first in his examination session. Rather than pursue an administrative career, he chose to remain in agriculture and became a farmer.

During the First World War, after several deferments, he was enlisted in September 1917 in the 18th Field Artillery Regiment at Agen, before being discharged on health grounds.

== Political career ==
=== Early political activity and first mayoralty (1925–1941) ===
Roubet became politically active in the mid-1920s, serving as secretary of a "democratic and social action committee" during the 1925 municipal elections. In 1927 he founded the Clairac branch of the SFIO and became its secretary. In 1931 he was elected to the administrative committee of the party's departmental federation.

Elected to the municipal council in 1929 on a left-wing unity list, he became mayor of Clairac. He was re-elected in the 1935 municipal elections, in which the Socialist list won all twenty-one seats on the council. His deputy mayors were Pierre Noguès and Adrien Vidal.

His terms in office saw several municipal infrastructure projects, including the electrification of Clairac between 1932 and 1935, the provision of a drinking-water supply, improvements to the road network and the consolidation of the town's schools. In July 1936, as a Socialist activist, he established a local committee of the Popular Front.

=== Vichy France and the Resistance ===
On 12 February 1941, Roubet was removed from office as mayor by the Vichy regime and replaced by Commander Maurice Baril. He was appointed the local representative of the Vichy agricultural organisation known as the Corporation paysanne.

He clandestinely distributed the Socialist newspaper Le Populaire for a Socialist Resistance movement. According to the Amis de Clairac association, citing the Order of Liberation, he became involved in December 1941 with the underground Socialist Party and the resistance movement La France au combat.

On 20 March 1944, Roubet was arrested by the Milice during an investigation into weapons from an Allied parachute drop intended for the Resistance. He was taken to the Château de Ferron, where he was interrogated and tortured by Yves Audebez. The prefect Louis Tuaillon, who was hostile to the Milice, intervened on his behalf.

Tried by the special section of the Agen court alongside Roger Trilla and Maurice Sampy, he was sentenced on 4 May 1944 to four months' imprisonment. He was detained in Agen from 31 March to 2 June 1944 and was then transferred to Eysses Prison. He was freed by the Maquis on 19 July 1944. According to the catalogue published by the departmental archives, approximately 220 prisoners were released at the time.

Roubet was reinstated as mayor by a prefectural order dated 2 October 1944. He was awarded the Resistance Medal by decree of 3 August 1946.

=== General Council of Lot-et-Garonne ===
In September 1944 Roubet was appointed as an agricultural expert to the farmers' commission of the departmental liberation committee. He subsequently stood in the cantonal elections of 23 and 30 September 1945 in the Canton of Tonneins.

He narrowly finished first in the opening round ahead of Communist candidate Fernand Ducasse. Ducasse withdrew in Roubet's favour under an agreement between the Socialist and Communist departmental federations. Roubet won the second round with more than 60 per cent of the vote against Pierre Vautrin, mayor of Tonneins, who stood as an "independent Socialist".

The departmental assembly had a left-wing majority consisting of eleven Socialists, ten Radicals, ten Communists and three independents. At its inaugural meeting on 29 October 1945, Roubet was nominated for the presidency by Communist councillor Robert Lacoste and elected with thirty votes out of thirty-two, becoming the first Socialist president of the General Council of Lot-et-Garonne.

In his inaugural address, he stated that the assembly's work should be guided by the principle of a "social Republic".

Roubet was re-elected as a general councillor on 27 March 1949 but lost the presidency of the assembly as the SFIO lost ground to the Radicals. He was succeeded by Doctor Toussaint, a Radical-Socialist, and became chairman of the agriculture and transport committee. In the 1955 cantonal elections, he was defeated by Jean Boué, mayor of Tonneins, and lost his seat.

=== Later terms as mayor and retirement ===
Reinstated as mayor of Clairac after the Liberation, Roubet was returned to office in the municipal elections of October 1947.

In the spring of 1949, angina pectoris forced him to take an extended period of rest and he resigned as mayor; his deputy Adrien Vidal succeeded him. Roubet returned to the mayoralty in 1953 after his list won twenty of the twenty-one seats on the municipal council.

He retired from political office in 1959 without seeking another term and was succeeded as mayor by Franck Bize. (Note: The catalogue published by the departmental archives presents Roubet's post-war terms as mayor as continuous from 1944 to 1959; André Lavialle's biography and the Maitron entry record an interruption between 1949 and 1953, during which Adrien Vidal served as mayor.)

Roubet died on 28 October 1994 and was buried in the cemetery at Clairac.

== Agricultural activities ==
Alongside his political offices, Roubet chaired the Lot-et-Garonne departmental federation of tobacco growers from the Liberation until 1966.

At national level, he served as secretary-general of the federation of tobacco growers under its president Ernest Delbos until the organisation's congress in Lille in the mid-1950s. He stepped down as president of the departmental federation in 1966, at the age of seventy, after ceasing to grow tobacco.

== Honours ==
- Resistance Medal (decree of 3 August 1946)

== Legacy ==
Roubet was the subject of a biography by André Lavialle, Rodolphe Roubet, published by Atlantica in 2008 and republished by Éditions d'Albret in 2016. The first edition included a foreword by Alain Veyret. The book was reviewed in the journal L'OURS. In 2025, the Departmental Archives of Lot-et-Garonne organised an exhibition devoted to Roubet and published an accompanying catalogue.

== Bibliography ==
- Lavialle, André (2008). Rodolphe Roubet (in French). Biarritz: Atlantica. p. 155. ISBN 978-2-7588-0102-3.
  - Reissued as: Lavialle, André (2016). Rodolphe Roubet (in French). Nérac: Éditions d'Albret. ISBN 978-2-913055-64-3.
- Lavergne, François (July–August 2008). "Rodolphe Roubet, un maire et sa ville". L'OURS (in French) (380): 4–5.
- Blois, Guy (1994). Clairac au temps de la IIIe République : de Sylvestre de Ferron à Rodolphe Roubet (1870–1940) (in French). Bayac: Éditions du Roc de Bourzac. p. 212. ISBN 2-87624-066-1.

== See also ==
- Clairac
- French Resistance
