= Milan (surname) =

Milan is an Italian surname. It is and also a Czech and Slovak surname (feminine: Milanová), derived from the given name Milan. Milán is a Spanish surname. Notable people with the surname include:

- Blair Milan (1981–2011), Australian actor and television presenter, son of Lyndey Milan
- Clyde Milan (1887–1953), American baseball player
- Don Milan (born 1949), American football quarterback
- Eduardo Milán (born 1952), Uruguayan poet and critic
- Gabriel Milan (c. 1631–1689), governor of the Danish West Indies
- Jonathan Milan (born 2000), Italian road cyclist
- Ľudmila Milanová (born 1967), Slovak alpine skier
- Luis de Milán (c. 1500–c. 1561), Spanish Renaissance composer, vihuela player and writer on music
- Lyndey Milan, Australian media personality
- Matteo Milan (born 2003), Italian racing cyclist
- Milton Milan (born 1962), American politician convicted of corruption
- Natália Milanová (born 1982), Slovak politician
- Susan Milan (born 1947), British classical flautist
- Victor Milán (1954–2018), American science-fiction writer

== See also ==
- Millan or Millán
