= Melian =

Melian may refer to:

- an adjectival formation of Milos or Melos, a city in Greece
- The Melian Dialogue, Athenian historian Thucydides’ dramatization of negotiations to resolve the Siege of Melos
- Melian (Middle-earth), a character in J. R. R. Tolkien's legendarium
- Méliane, a character in Tyr et Sidon, ou les funestes amours de Belcar et Méliane by Jean de Schelandre
- Melian Stokes, a character in Pugs and Peacocks by Gilbert Cannan

== People with "Melian" or "Melián" as last name ==
- Alberto Melián (born 1990), Argentinian boxer
- Daniel Sarmiento Melián (born 1983), Spanish handball player
- Diego Melián (born 1991), Uruguayan footballer
- Elena Melián (born 2001), Spanish swimmer
- Francisco Núñez Melián (died 1644), Spanish adventurer and administrator
- Jackson Melián (born 1980), Venezuelan baseball player
- José Antonio Melián (1784–1857), Argentinian colonel
- Juan Carlos Melian, member of Vital Information jazz group
- Michaela Melián, a member of FSK (band)

== People with "Melian" or "Melián" as first or middle name ==
- Luis Melián Lafinur (1850–1939), a Uruguayan politician
- Florence Stawell (middle name Melian) (1869–1936), an Australian classical scholar

== See also ==
- Melia (disambiguation)
- Meilan (disambiguation)
