= Fourques =

Fourques is the name or part of the name of several communes in France:

- Fourques, Gard, in the Gard department
- Fourques, Pyrénées-Orientales, in the Pyrénées-Orientales department
- Fourques, former commune of the Somme department, now part of Athies, Somme
- Fourques-sur-Garonne, in the Lot-et-Garonne department
