= Meilhan =

Meilhan is the name or part of the name of the following communes in France:

- Meilhan, Gers, in the Gers department
- Meilhan, Landes, in the Landes department
- Meilhan-sur-Garonne, called Meilhan before 1919, in the Lot-et-Garonne department
- Saint-Sauveur-de-Meilhan, in the Lot-et-Garonne department
