= Gontaud-Fauguerolles station =

Railway station in Fauguerolles, France

Coordinates: 44°26′36″N 0°15′01″E

Gontaud-Fauguerolles

General information
- Location: Fauguerolles, Lot-et-Garonne, Nouvelle-Aquitaine; France
- Line: Bordeaux–Sète railway
- Platforms: 2
- Tracks: 2
Location

Gontaud-Fauguerolles is a former railway station in Fauguerolles, Nouvelle-Aquitaine, France. The station was located on the Bordeaux–Sète railway, between Marmande and Agen.
