= Sainte-Bazeille =

- Commune
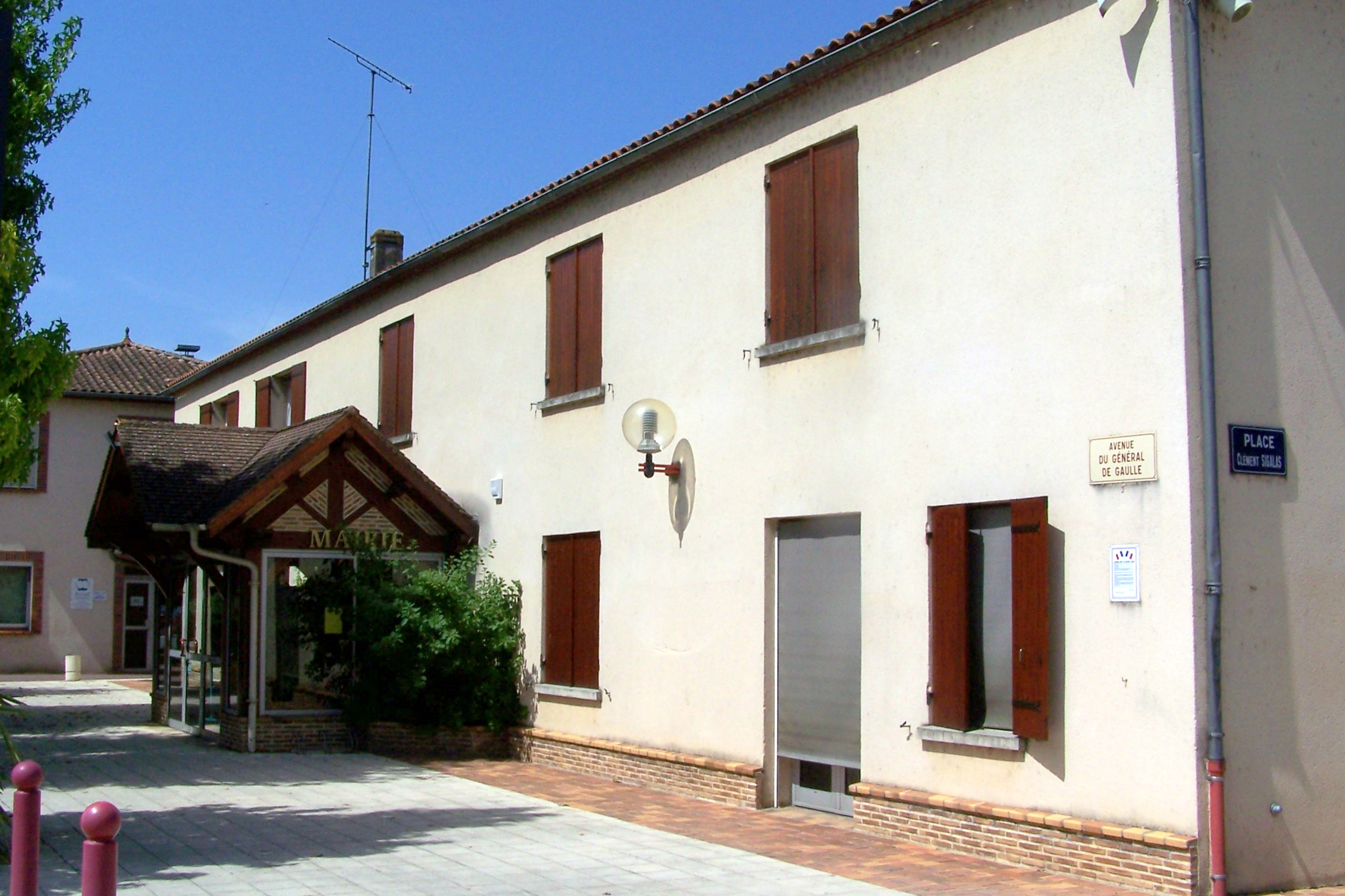
- The town hall in Sainte-Bazeille

- Coat of arms
- Location of Sainte-Bazeille
- Location within France Location within Nouvelle-Aquitaine
- Coordinates: 44°31′52″N 0°05′42″E
- Country: France
- Region: Nouvelle-Aquitaine
- Department: Lot-et-Garonne
- Arrondissement: Marmande
- Canton: Marmande-1
- Intercommunality: Val de Garonne Agglomération

Government
  - Mayor (2020–2026): Gilles Lagaüzère
- Area^{1}: 20.67 km^{2} (7.98 sq mi)
- Elevation: 29 m (95 ft)
- Highest elevation: 87 m (285 ft)
- Lowest elevation: 12 m (39 ft)
- Population (2023): 3,171
  - Density: 153.4/km^{2} (397.3/sq mi)
- Time zone: UTC+01:00 (CET)
  - Summer (DST): UTC+02:00 (CEST)
- INSEE/Postal code: 47233 /47180
- ^{1} French Land Register data, which excludes lakes, ponds, glaciers > 1 km^{2} (0.386 sq mi or 247 acres) and river estuaries.

Sainte-Bazeille (French pronunciation: [sɛ̃t bazɛj]; Occitan: Senta Baselha) is a commune in the Lot-et-Garonne department, administrative region of Nouvelle-Aquitaine (before 2015: Aquitaine), southwestern France. Sainte-Bazeille station has rail connections to Agen, Langon and Bordeaux.

== Population ==
Historical population
Year	Pop.	±% p.a.
1968	1,948	—
1975	2,368	+2.83%
1982	2,626	+1.49%
1990	2,629	+0.01%
1999	2,656	+0.11%
2007	2,880	+1.02%
2012	3,140	+1.74%
2017	3,136	−0.03%
2023	3,171	+0.19%
Source: INSEE

== See also ==
- Communes of the Lot-et-Garonne department
