= Canton of Marmande-2 =

Coordinates: 44.50°N 0.17°E

The canton of Marmande-2 is an administrative division of the Lot-et-Garonne department, southwestern France. It was created at the French canton reorganisation which came into effect in March 2015. Its seat is in Marmande.

It consists of the following communes:

1. Birac-sur-Trec
2. Caumont-sur-Garonne
3. Fauguerolles
4. Fourques-sur-Garonne
5. Gontaud-de-Nogaret
6. Longueville
7. Marmande (partly)
8. Saint-Pardoux-du-Breuil
9. Samazan
10. Taillebourg
11. Virazeil
