= Grateloup-Saint-Gayrand =

- Commune
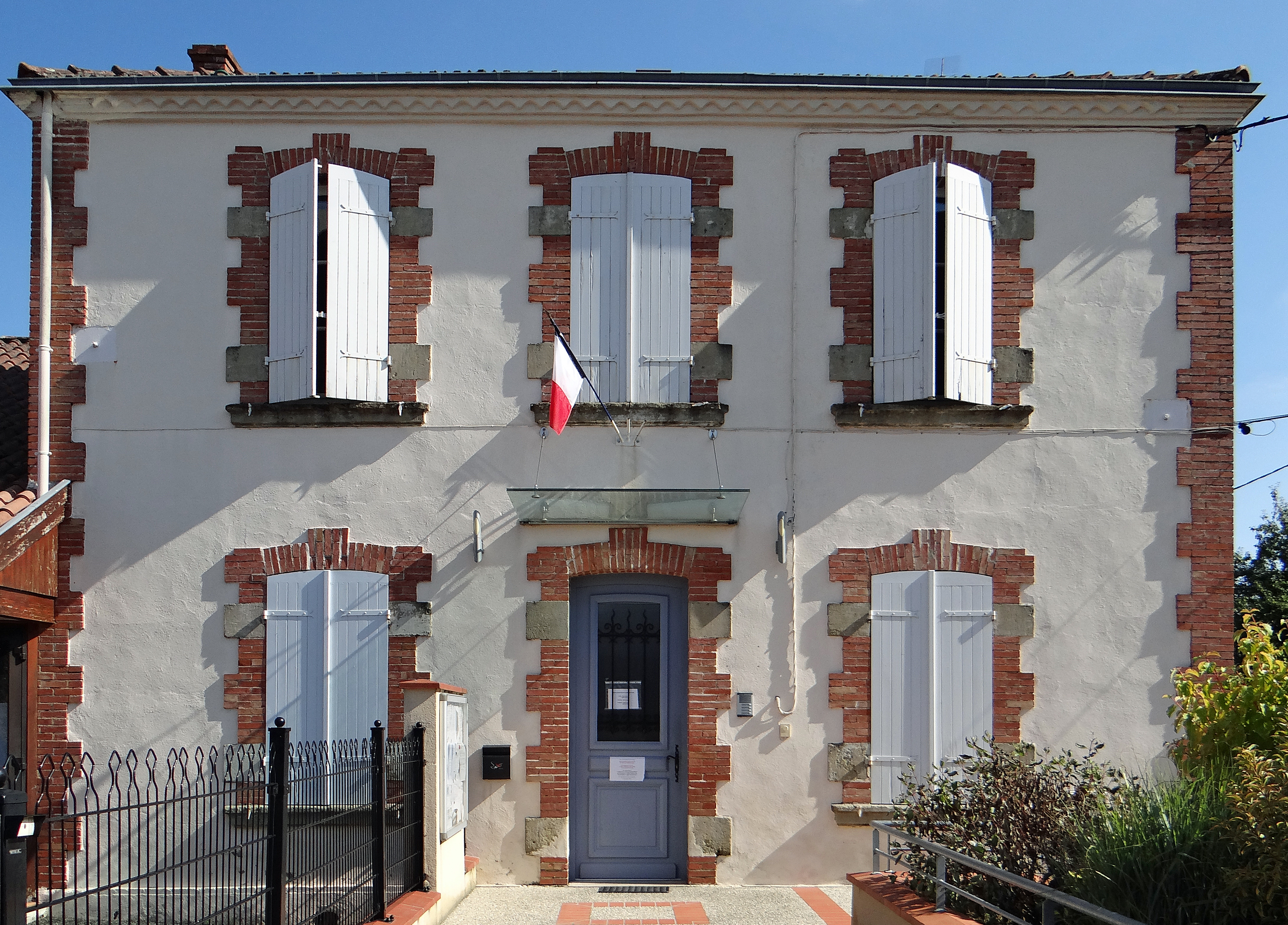
- Location of Grateloup-Saint-Gayrand
- Location within France Location within Nouvelle-Aquitaine
- Coordinates: 44°25′21″N 0°23′15″E
- Country: France
- Region: Nouvelle-Aquitaine
- Department: Lot-et-Garonne
- Arrondissement: Marmande
- Canton: Tonneins
- Intercommunality: Val de Garonne Agglomération

Government
  - Mayor (2020–2026): Nadine Zanardo
- Area^{1}: 20.67 km^{2} (7.98 sq mi)
- Elevation: 132 m (433 ft)
- Highest elevation: 172 m (564 ft)
- Lowest elevation: 42 m (138 ft)
- Population (2023): 469
  - Density: 22.7/km^{2} (58.8/sq mi)
- Time zone: UTC+01:00 (CET)
  - Summer (DST): UTC+02:00 (CEST)
- INSEE/Postal code: 47112 /47400
- ^{1} French Land Register data, which excludes lakes, ponds, glaciers > 1 km^{2} (0.386 sq mi or 247 acres) and river estuaries.

Grateloup-Saint-Gayrand (French pronunciation: [ɡʁatlu sɛ̃ ɡɛʁɑ̃]; Occitan: Gratalop e Sengairan, before 2002: Grateloup) is a commune in the Lot-et-Garonne department in south-western France.

== See also ==
- Communes of the Lot-et-Garonne department
