= Caumont-sur-Garonne =

- Commune
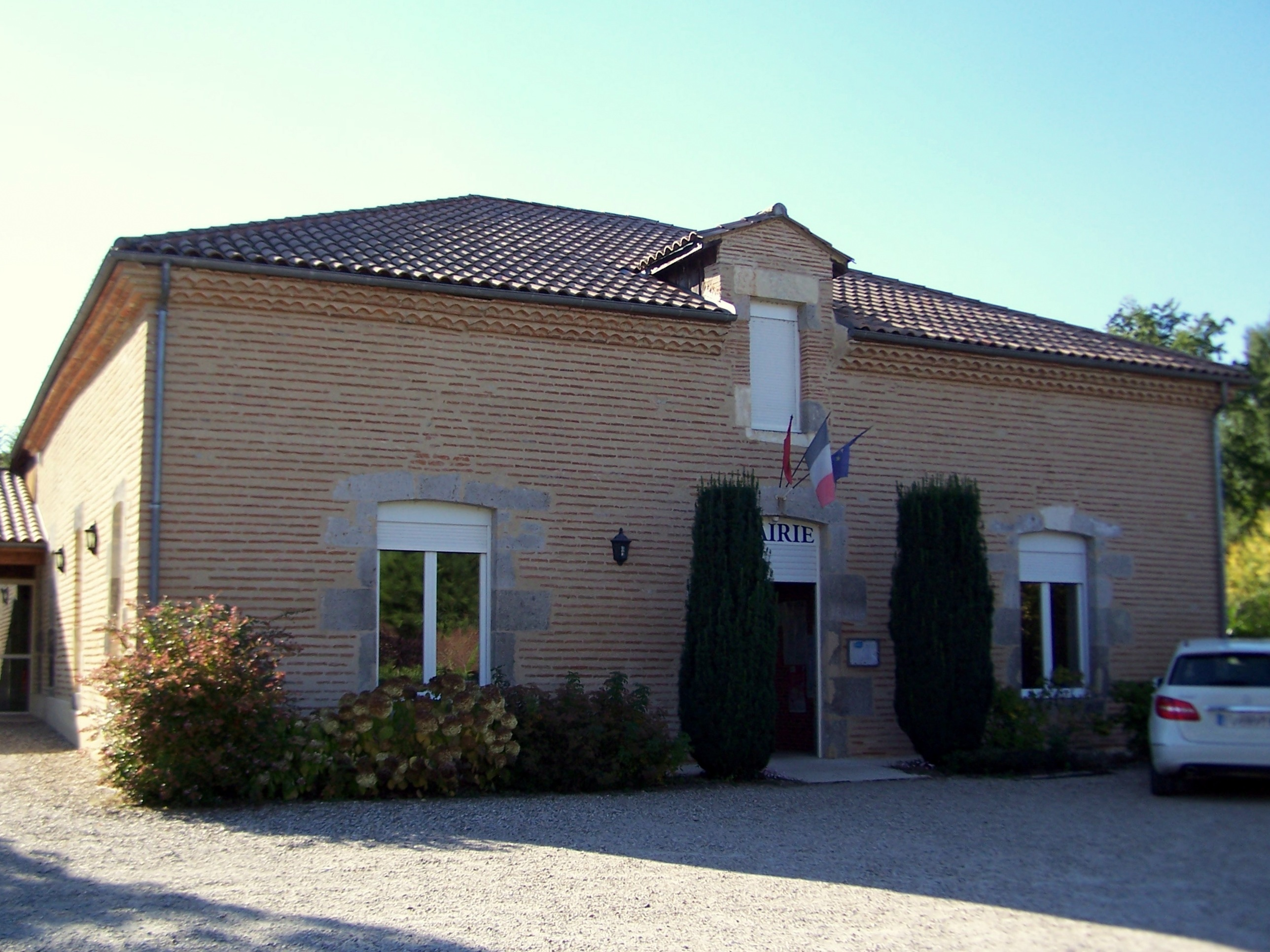

- Coat of arms
- Location of Caumont-sur-Garonne
- Location within France Location within Nouvelle-Aquitaine
- Coordinates: 44°26′23″N 0°10′55″E
- Country: France
- Region: Nouvelle-Aquitaine
- Department: Lot-et-Garonne
- Arrondissement: Marmande
- Canton: Marmande-2
- Intercommunality: Val de Garonne Agglomération

Government
  - Mayor (2020–2026): Pierre Imbert
- Area^{1}: 11.61 km^{2} (4.48 sq mi)
- Elevation: 28 m (92 ft)
- Highest elevation: 86 m (282 ft)
- Lowest elevation: 17 m (56 ft)
- Population (2023): 823
  - Density: 70.9/km^{2} (184/sq mi)
- Time zone: UTC+01:00 (CET)
  - Summer (DST): UTC+02:00 (CEST)
- INSEE/Postal code: 47061 /47430
- ^{1} French Land Register data, which excludes lakes, ponds, glaciers > 1 km^{2} (0.386 sq mi or 247 acres) and river estuaries.

Caumont-sur-Garonne (French pronunciation: [komɔ̃ syʁ ɡaʁɔn], literally Caumont on Garonne; Occitan: Caumont de Garòna) is a commune in the Lot-et-Garonne department in south-western France.

== See also ==
- Communes of the Lot-et-Garonne department
