= Samazan =

- Commune
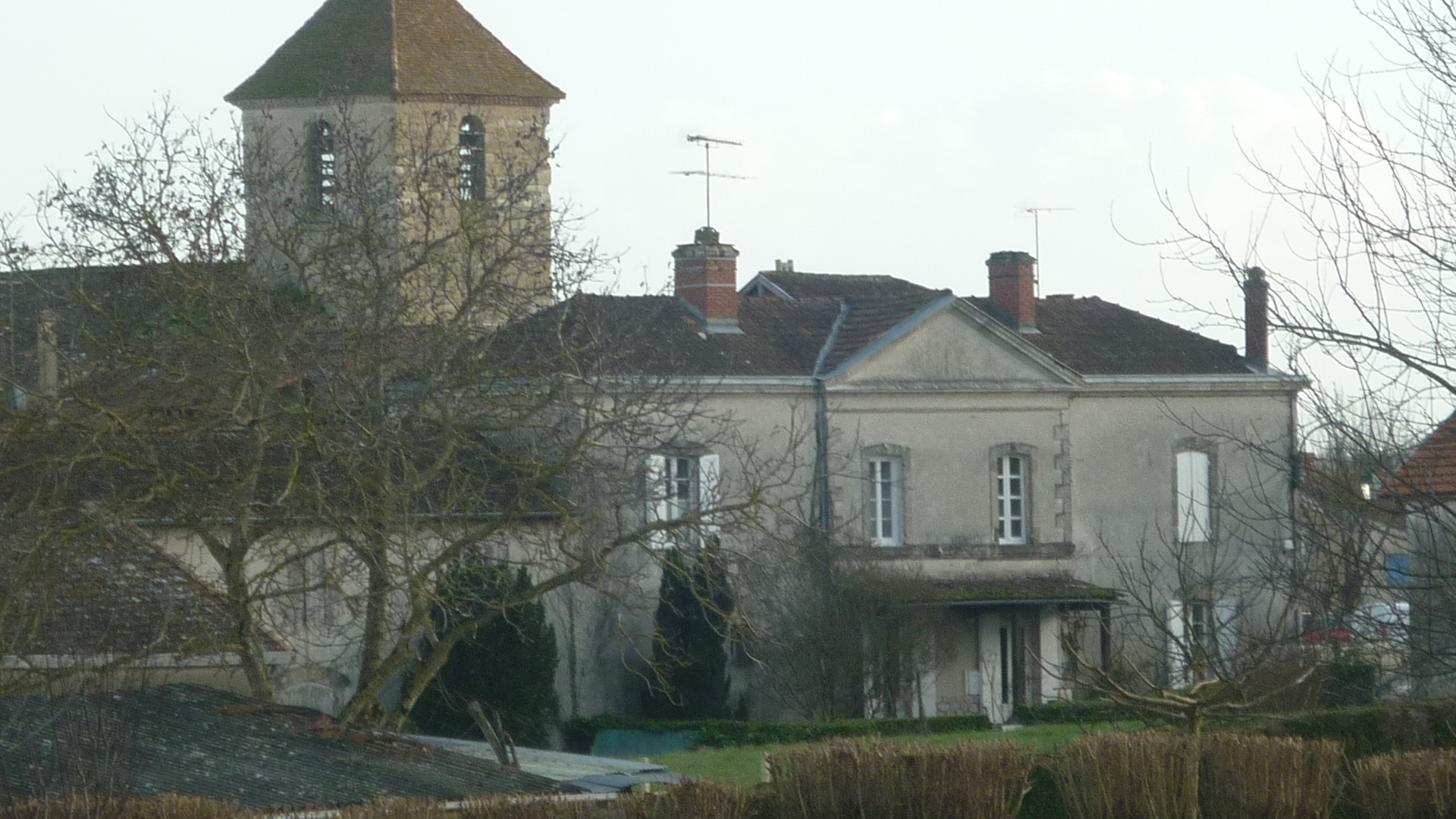
- The radio and television headquarters of the TSF Network in Aquitaine
- Location of Samazan
- Location within France Location within Nouvelle-Aquitaine
- Coordinates: 44°26′05″N 0°06′46″E
- Country: France
- Region: Nouvelle-Aquitaine
- Department: Lot-et-Garonne
- Arrondissement: Marmande
- Canton: Marmande-2
- Intercommunality: Val de Garonne Agglomération

Government
  - Mayor (2020–2026): Bernard Monpouillan
- Area^{1}: 17.25 km^{2} (6.66 sq mi)
- Elevation: 87 m (285 ft)
- Highest elevation: 133 m (436 ft)
- Lowest elevation: 24 m (79 ft)
- Population (2023): 835
  - Density: 48.4/km^{2} (125/sq mi)
- Time zone: UTC+01:00 (CET)
  - Summer (DST): UTC+02:00 (CEST)
- INSEE/Postal code: 47285 /47250
- ^{1} French Land Register data, which excludes lakes, ponds, glaciers > 1 km^{2} (0.386 sq mi or 247 acres) and river estuaries.

Samazan (French pronunciation: [samazɑ̃]; Occitan: Samasan) is a commune in the Lot-et-Garonne department in south-western France.

== See also ==
- Communes of the Lot-et-Garonne department
