= Marcellus, Lot-et-Garonne =

Marcellus
- Commune
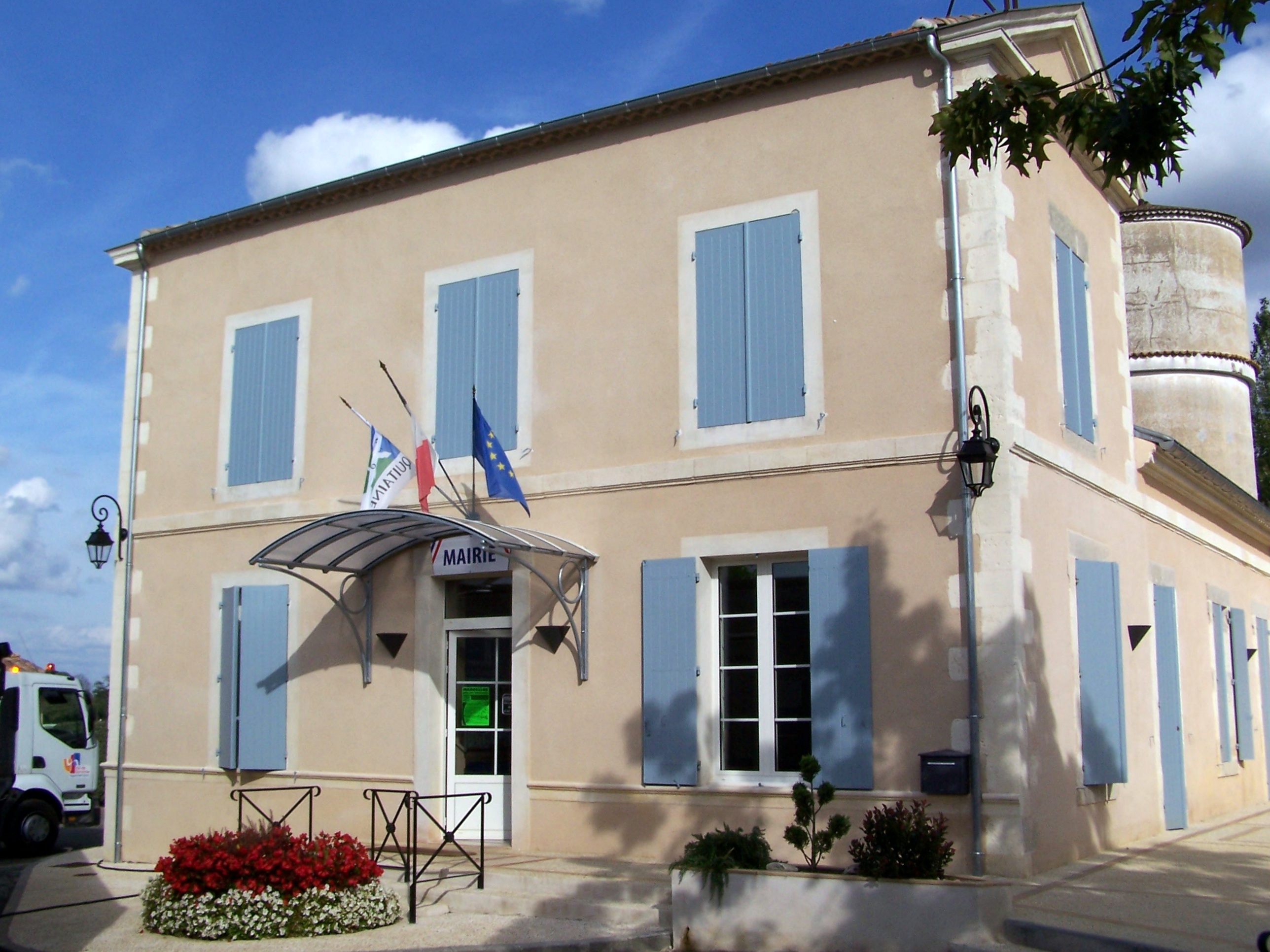
- The town hall in Marcellus

- Coat of arms
- Location of Marcellus
- Location within France Location within Nouvelle-Aquitaine
- Coordinates: 44°28′54″N 0°04′44″E
- Country: France
- Region: Nouvelle-Aquitaine
- Department: Lot-et-Garonne
- Arrondissement: Marmande
- Canton: Marmande-1
- Intercommunality: Val de Garonne Agglomération

Government
  - Mayor (2020–2026): Jean Claude Derc
- Area^{1}: 11.77 km^{2} (4.54 sq mi)
- Elevation: 70 m (230 ft)
- Highest elevation: 82 m (269 ft)
- Lowest elevation: 15 m (49 ft)
- Population (2023): 892
  - Density: 75.8/km^{2} (196/sq mi)
- Time zone: UTC+01:00 (CET)
  - Summer (DST): UTC+02:00 (CEST)
- INSEE/Postal code: 47156 /47200
- ^{1} French Land Register data, which excludes lakes, ponds, glaciers > 1 km^{2} (0.386 sq mi or 247 acres) and river estuaries.

Marcellus is a commune in the Lot-et-Garonne department in south-western France.

== See also ==
- Communes of the Lot-et-Garonne department
