= Saint-Sauveur-de-Meilhan =

- Commune
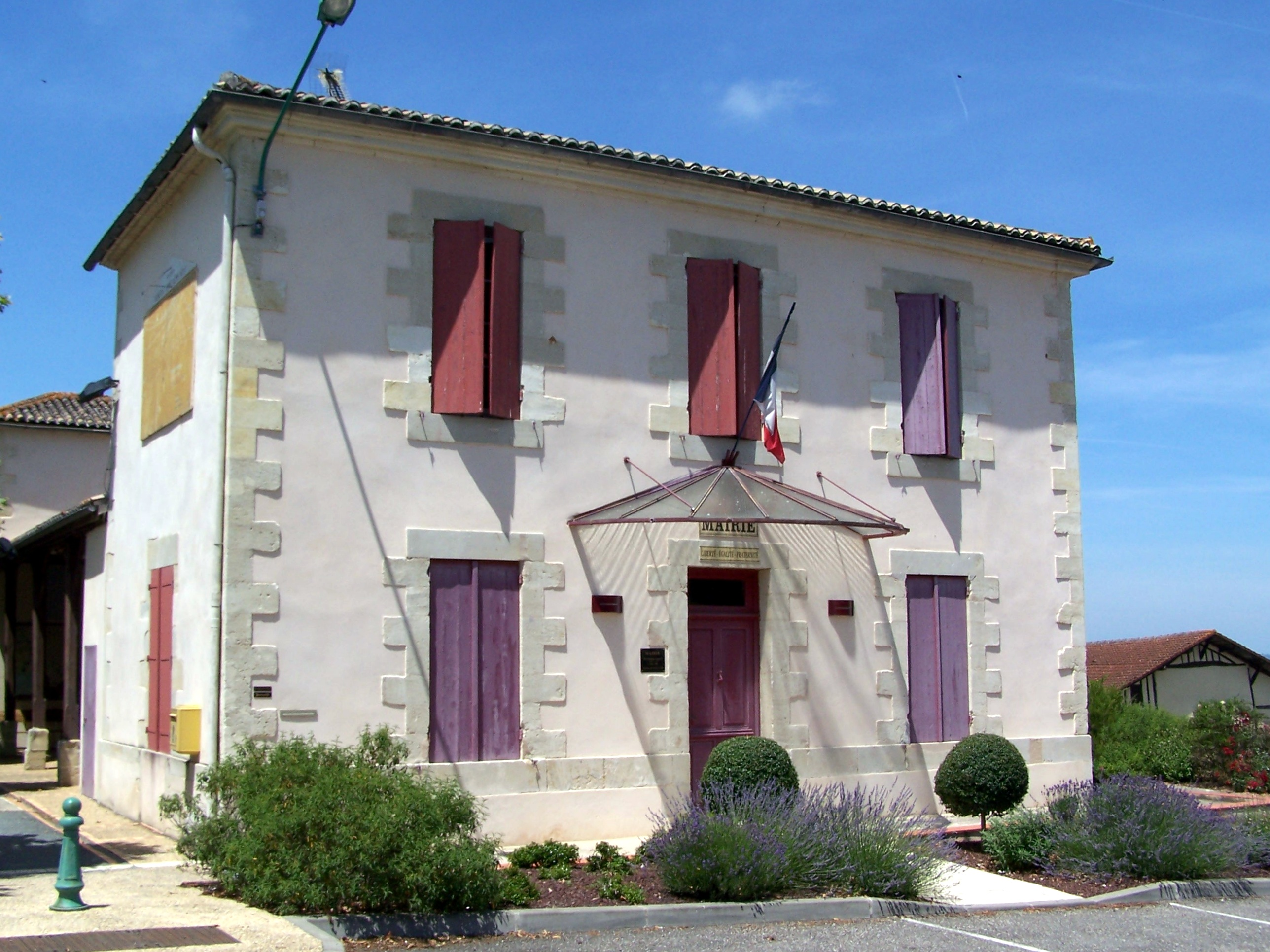
- The town hall in Saint-Sauveur-de-Meilhan
- Location of Saint-Sauveur-de-Meilhan
- Location within France Location within Nouvelle-Aquitaine
- Coordinates: 44°28′57″N 0°00′02″W
- Country: France
- Region: Nouvelle-Aquitaine
- Department: Lot-et-Garonne
- Arrondissement: Marmande
- Canton: Marmande-1
- Intercommunality: Val de Garonne Agglomération

Government
  - Mayor (2022–2026): Tanguy Clabon
- Area^{1}: 7.03 km^{2} (2.71 sq mi)
- Elevation: 110 m (360 ft)
- Highest elevation: 132 m (433 ft)
- Lowest elevation: 23 m (75 ft)
- Population (2023): 341
  - Density: 48.5/km^{2} (126/sq mi)
- Time zone: UTC+01:00 (CET)
  - Summer (DST): UTC+02:00 (CEST)
- INSEE/Postal code: 47277 /47180
- ^{1} French Land Register data, which excludes lakes, ponds, glaciers > 1 km^{2} (0.386 sq mi or 247 acres) and river estuaries.

Saint-Sauveur-de-Meilhan (French pronunciation: [sɛ̃ sovœʁ də mɛjɑ̃], literally Saint-Sauveur of Meilhan; Occitan: Sent Sauvador de Milhan) is a commune in the Lot-et-Garonne department in south-western France.

== See also ==
- Communes of the Lot-et-Garonne department
