= Beaupuy, Lot-et-Garonne =

Beaupuy
- Commune
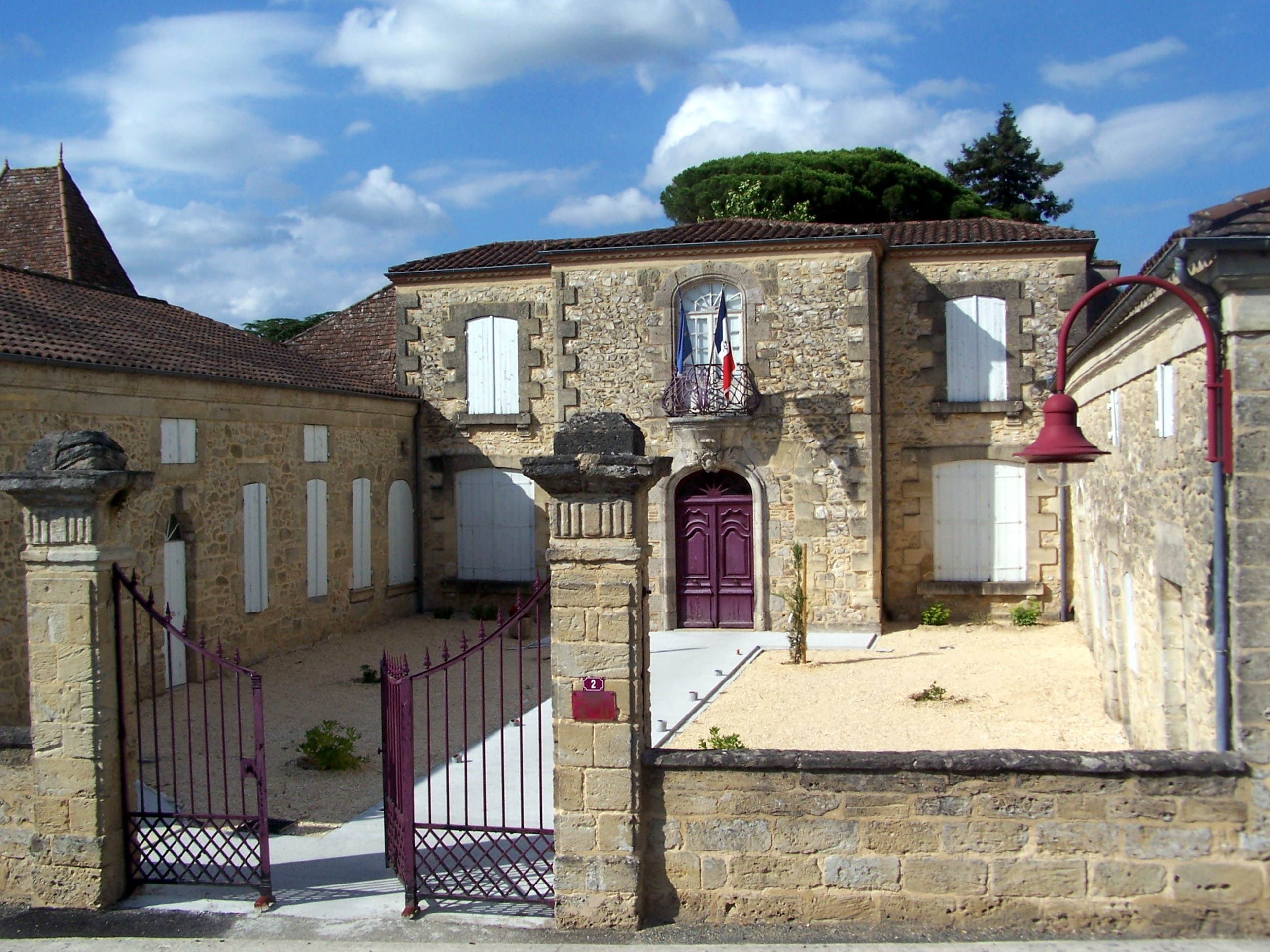
- Town hall
- Location of Beaupuy
- Location within France Location within Nouvelle-Aquitaine
- Coordinates: 44°32′11″N 0°08′48″E
- Country: France
- Region: Nouvelle-Aquitaine
- Department: Lot-et-Garonne
- Arrondissement: Marmande
- Canton: Marmande-1
- Intercommunality: Val de Garonne Agglomération

Government
  - Mayor (2020–2026): Christian Pezzutti
- Area^{1}: 8.17 km^{2} (3.15 sq mi)
- Elevation: 100 m (330 ft)
- Highest elevation: 103 m (338 ft)
- Lowest elevation: 28 m (92 ft)
- Population (2023): 1,712
  - Density: 210/km^{2} (543/sq mi)
- Time zone: UTC+01:00 (CET)
  - Summer (DST): UTC+02:00 (CEST)
- INSEE/Postal code: 47024 /47200
- ^{1} French Land Register data, which excludes lakes, ponds, glaciers > 1 km^{2} (0.386 sq mi or 247 acres) and river estuaries.

Beaupuy (French pronunciation: [bopɥi]; Occitan: Bèthpug) is a commune in the Lot-et-Garonne department in southwestern France.

== Population ==
Historical population
Year	Pop.	±% p.a.
1968	585	—
1975	739	+3.39%
1982	964	+3.87%
1990	1,050	+1.07%
1999	1,028	−0.24%
2007	1,332	+3.29%
2012	1,556	+3.16%
2017	1,650	+1.18%
2023	1,712	+0.62%
Source: INSEE

== See also ==
- Communes of the Lot-et-Garonne department
