= Varès =

- Commune
- Coat of arms
- Location of Varès
- Location within France Location within Nouvelle-Aquitaine
- Coordinates: 44°25′45″N 0°21′23″E
- Country: France
- Region: Nouvelle-Aquitaine
- Department: Lot-et-Garonne
- Arrondissement: Marmande
- Canton: Tonneins
- Intercommunality: Val de Garonne Agglomération

Government
  - Mayor (2020–2026): René Zaros
- Area^{1}: 16.79 km^{2} (6.48 sq mi)
- Elevation: 40 m (130 ft)
- Highest elevation: 137 m (449 ft)
- Lowest elevation: 35 m (115 ft)
- Population (2023): 655
  - Density: 39.0/km^{2} (101/sq mi)
- Time zone: UTC+01:00 (CET)
  - Summer (DST): UTC+02:00 (CEST)
- INSEE/Postal code: 47316 /47400
- ^{1} French Land Register data, which excludes lakes, ponds, glaciers > 1 km^{2} (0.386 sq mi or 247 acres) and river estuaries.

Varès (French pronunciation: [vaʁɛs]; Occitan: Varés) is a commune in the Lot-et-Garonne department in south-western France.

== See also ==
- Communes of the Lot-et-Garonne department
