= Hautesvignes =

- Commune
- Location of Hautesvignes
- Location within France Location within Nouvelle-Aquitaine
- Coordinates: 44°27′36″N 0°21′11″E
- Country: France
- Region: Nouvelle-Aquitaine
- Department: Lot-et-Garonne
- Arrondissement: Marmande
- Canton: Tonneins
- Intercommunality: Lot et Tolzac

Government
  - Mayor (2020–2026): Pascal Andrieux
- Area^{1}: 8.85 km^{2} (3.42 sq mi)
- Elevation: 145 m (476 ft)
- Highest elevation: 142 m (466 ft)
- Lowest elevation: 48 m (157 ft)
- Population (2023): 163
  - Density: 18.4/km^{2} (47.7/sq mi)
- Time zone: UTC+01:00 (CET)
  - Summer (DST): UTC+02:00 (CEST)
- INSEE/Postal code: 47118 /47400
- ^{1} French Land Register data, which excludes lakes, ponds, glaciers > 1 km^{2} (0.386 sq mi or 247 acres) and river estuaries.

Hautesvignes (French pronunciation: [ɔtətviɲ]; Occitan: Hautasvinhas) is a commune in the Lot-et-Garonne department in south-western France.

== See also ==
- Communes of the Lot-et-Garonne department
