= Montpouillan =

- Commune
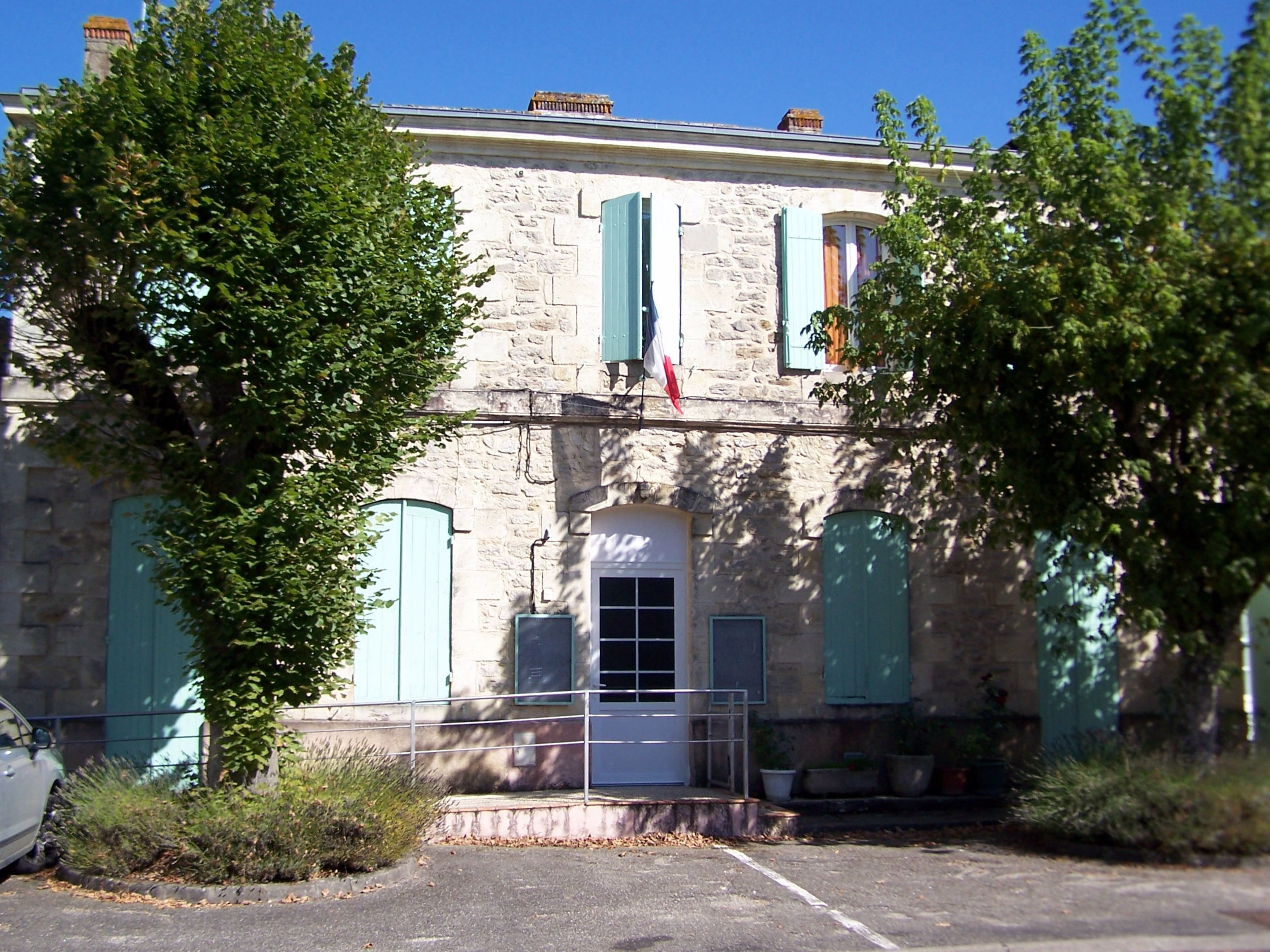
- The town hall in Montpouillan

- Coat of arms
- Location of Montpouillan
- Location within France Location within Nouvelle-Aquitaine
- Coordinates: 44°28′07″N 0°06′21″E
- Country: France
- Region: Nouvelle-Aquitaine
- Department: Lot-et-Garonne
- Arrondissement: Marmande
- Canton: Marmande-1
- Intercommunality: Val de Garonne Agglomération

Government
  - Mayor (2024–2026): Claudette Tillot
- Area^{1}: 12.07 km^{2} (4.66 sq mi)
- Elevation: 28 m (92 ft)
- Highest elevation: 133 m (436 ft)
- Lowest elevation: 18 m (59 ft)
- Population (2023): 807
  - Density: 66.9/km^{2} (173/sq mi)
- Time zone: UTC+01:00 (CET)
  - Summer (DST): UTC+02:00 (CEST)
- INSEE/Postal code: 47191 /47200
- ^{1} French Land Register data, which excludes lakes, ponds, glaciers > 1 km^{2} (0.386 sq mi or 247 acres) and river estuaries.

Montpouillan (French pronunciation: [mɔ̃pujɑ̃]; Occitan: Montpolhan) is a commune in the Lot-et-Garonne department in south-western France.

== See also ==
- Communes of the Lot-et-Garonne department
