= Castelmoron-sur-Lot =

- Commune
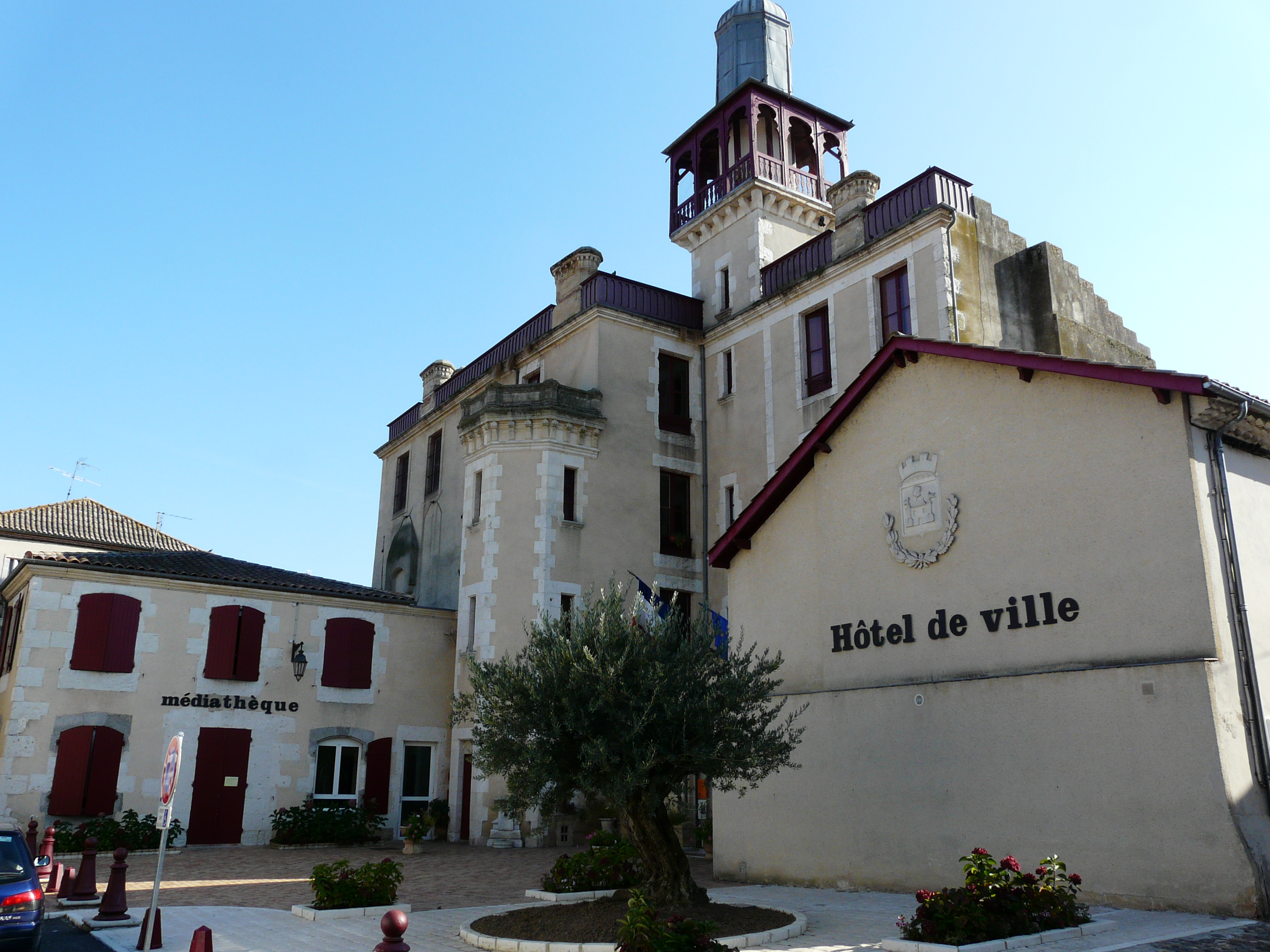
- The town hall in Castelmoron-sur-Lot

- Coat of arms
- Location of Castelmoron-sur-Lot
- Location within France Location within Nouvelle-Aquitaine
- Coordinates: 44°23′53″N 0°29′45″E
- Country: France
- Region: Nouvelle-Aquitaine
- Department: Lot-et-Garonne
- Arrondissement: Marmande
- Canton: Tonneins
- Intercommunality: Lot et Tolzac

Government
  - Mayor (2020–2026): Line Lalaurie
- Area^{1}: 23.25 km^{2} (8.98 sq mi)
- Elevation: 50 m (160 ft)
- Highest elevation: 195 m (640 ft)
- Lowest elevation: 32 m (105 ft)
- Population (2023): 1,842
  - Density: 79.23/km^{2} (205.2/sq mi)
- Time zone: UTC+01:00 (CET)
  - Summer (DST): UTC+02:00 (CEST)
- INSEE/Postal code: 47054 /47260
- ^{1} French Land Register data, which excludes lakes, ponds, glaciers > 1 km^{2} (0.386 sq mi or 247 acres) and river estuaries.

Castelmoron-sur-Lot (French pronunciation: [kastɛlmɔʁɔ̃ syʁ lɔt], literally Castelmoron on Lot; Occitan: Castèlmauron d'Òut) is a commune in the Lot-et-Garonne department in south-western France.

== See also ==
- Communes of the Lot-et-Garonne department
