= Canton of Marmande-1 =

Coordinates: 44.50°N 0.16°E

The canton of Marmande-1 is an administrative division of the Lot-et-Garonne department, southwestern France. It was created at the French canton reorganisation which came into effect in March 2015. Its seat is in Marmande.

It consists of the following communes:

1. Beaupuy
2. Cocumont
3. Couthures-sur-Garonne
4. Gaujac
5. Marcellus
6. Marmande (partly)
7. Meilhan-sur-Garonne
8. Montpouillan
9. Sainte-Bazeille
10. Saint-Sauveur-de-Meilhan
