= Cocumont =

- Commune
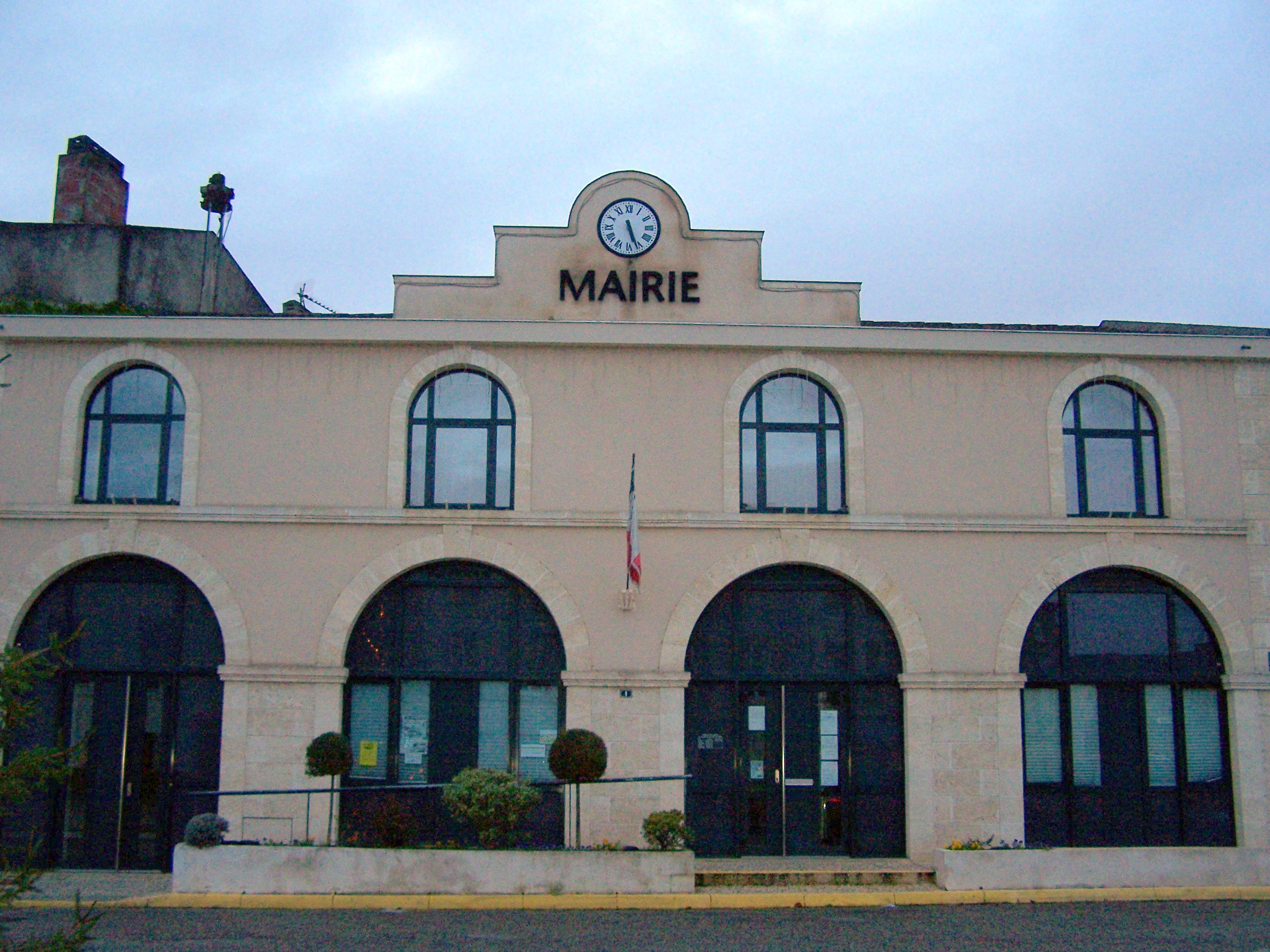
- The town hall in Cocumont

- Coat of arms
- Location of Cocumont
- Location within France Location within Nouvelle-Aquitaine
- Coordinates: 44°26′59″N 0°01′37″E
- Country: France
- Region: Nouvelle-Aquitaine
- Department: Lot-et-Garonne
- Arrondissement: Marmande
- Canton: Marmande-1
- Intercommunality: Val de Garonne Agglomération

Government
  - Mayor (2020–2026): Jean-Luc Armand
- Area^{1}: 25.44 km^{2} (9.82 sq mi)
- Elevation: 135 m (443 ft)
- Highest elevation: 148 m (486 ft)
- Lowest elevation: 33 m (108 ft)
- Population (2023): 1,133
  - Density: 44.54/km^{2} (115.3/sq mi)
- Time zone: UTC+01:00 (CET)
  - Summer (DST): UTC+02:00 (CEST)
- INSEE/Postal code: 47068 /47250
- ^{1} French Land Register data, which excludes lakes, ponds, glaciers > 1 km^{2} (0.386 sq mi or 247 acres) and river estuaries.

Cocumont (French pronunciation: [kɔkymɔ̃]) is a commune in the Lot-et-Garonne department in south-western France.

== See also ==
- Communes of the Lot-et-Garonne department
