= Fresh with the Australian Women's Weekly =

- Also known as: Fresh
- Genre: Cooking
- Country of origin: Australia
- Original language: English
- No. of seasons: 10
- No. of episodes: 2,260

Production
- Production locations: Nine Sydney, Sydney, Australia
- Running time: 24 minutes (w/o commercials)

Original release
- Network: Nine Network
- Release: 17 July 2000 – 13 March 2009

Fresh with the Australian Women's Weekly was an Australian television program which aired on the Nine Network. The show began on 17 July 2000 known simply as Fresh and had screened in various timeslots.

== Hosts ==
- Jason Roberts (2000–2003)
- Geoff Jansz (2004–2006)
- Pete Evans (2007–2009)
- Lyndey Milan (2000–2009)

== Ill-fated Expansion ==
The format of the show was changed from 30 April 2007 to include more lifestyle features and stories. It was lengthened to an hour and moved to midday. This move, however, only lasted for two weeks and from 14 May the show was cut back to half an hour and returned to its previous 11:30 am timeslot. In 2008, it was announced that The Australian Women's Weekly would no longer sponsor Fresh, and this ultimately became the reason for its axing.

== Cancellation ==
On 19 February 2009, the Nine Network announced that the program had been axed due to there being no sponsor, with the last-ever episode airing on 13 March 2009. However, Fresh's cooking segments were to continue in Mornings with Kerri-Anne.

The last-ever broadcast ended with a final goodbye from Pete Evans and Lyndey Milan, thanking viewers for their support over the previous nine years followed by a look at archived memories from the previous nine years.

The following week, the Fresh website was removed. The program was replaced with regional affiliate WIN Television's Alive and Cooking which aired for a month, until it too was removed from the line-up, replaced by the extended Nine Morning News.

== Easy Eats ==
The show's highlights dubbed as episodes edited in Easy Eats, an hour show dedicated to cooking. It was broadcast on the Nine Network since 2019.

== See also ==
- List of programs broadcast by Nine Network
- List of Australian television series
