= Fauillet =

- Commune
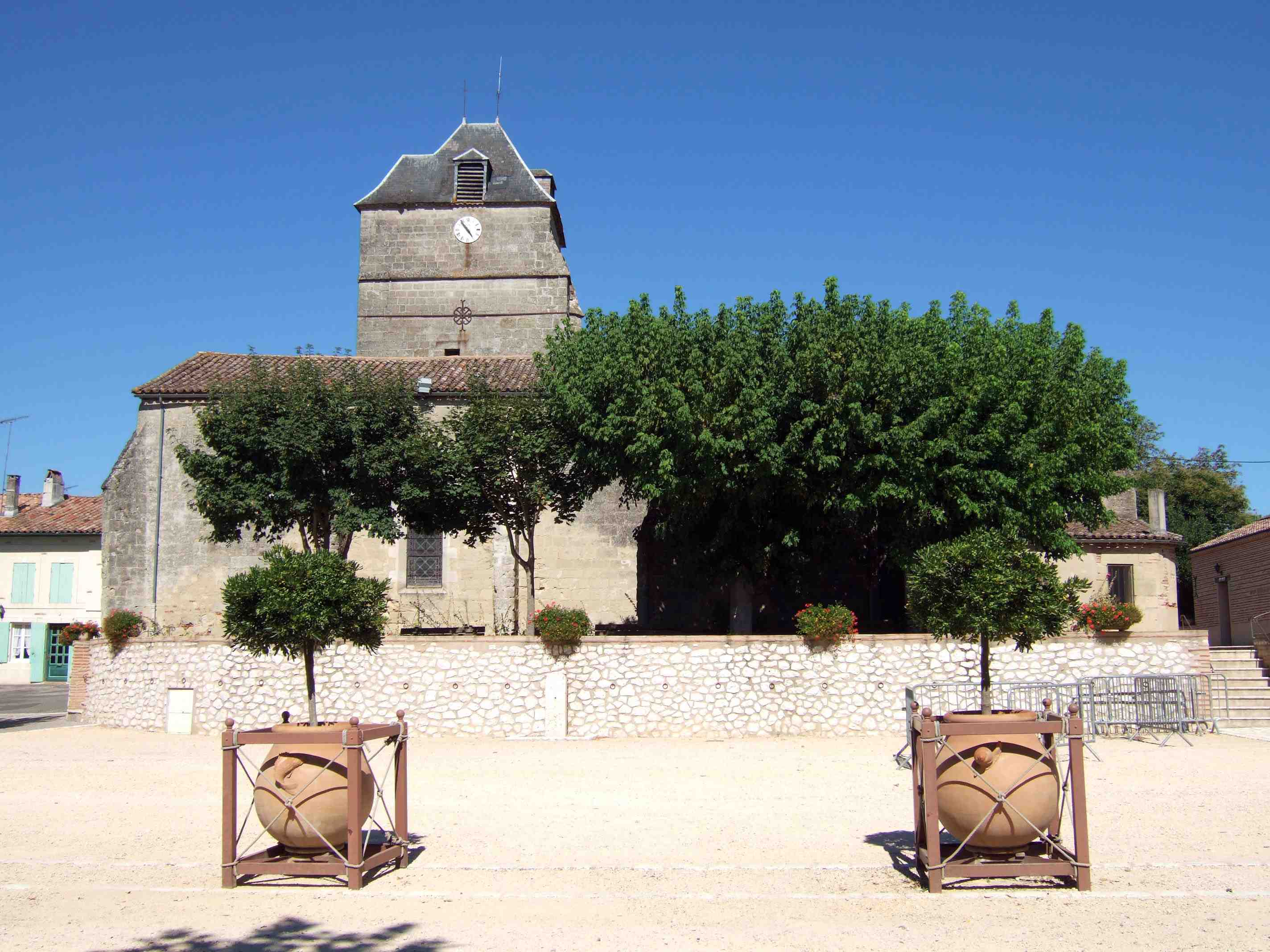
- The church in Fauillet
- Location of Fauillet
- Location within France Location within Nouvelle-Aquitaine
- Coordinates: 44°25′37″N 0°17′27″E
- Country: France
- Region: Nouvelle-Aquitaine
- Department: Lot-et-Garonne
- Arrondissement: Marmande
- Canton: Tonneins
- Intercommunality: Val de Garonne Agglomération

Government
  - Mayor (2020–2026): Gilbert Dufourg
- Area^{1}: 14.23 km^{2} (5.49 sq mi)
- Elevation: 39 m (128 ft)
- Highest elevation: 88 m (289 ft)
- Lowest elevation: 23 m (75 ft)
- Population (2023): 864
  - Density: 60.7/km^{2} (157/sq mi)
- Time zone: UTC+01:00 (CET)
  - Summer (DST): UTC+02:00 (CEST)
- INSEE/Postal code: 47095 /47400
- ^{1} French Land Register data, which excludes lakes, ponds, glaciers > 1 km^{2} (0.386 sq mi or 247 acres) and river estuaries.

Fauillet (French pronunciation: [fojɛ]; Occitan: Haulhet) is a commune in the Lot-et-Garonne department in south-western France.

== See also ==
- Communes of the Lot-et-Garonne department
