= Longueville, Lot-et-Garonne =

Longueville
- Commune
- Location of Longueville
- Location within France Location within Nouvelle-Aquitaine
- Coordinates: 44°27′45″N 0°13′01″E
- Country: France
- Region: Nouvelle-Aquitaine
- Department: Lot-et-Garonne
- Arrondissement: Marmande
- Canton: Marmande-2
- Intercommunality: Val de Garonne Agglomération

Government
  - Mayor (2020–2026): Jean-Pierre Tilhac
- Area^{1}: 4.79 km^{2} (1.85 sq mi)
- Elevation: 32 m (105 ft)
- Highest elevation: 35 m (115 ft)
- Lowest elevation: 20 m (66 ft)
- Population (2023): 376
  - Density: 78.5/km^{2} (203/sq mi)
- Time zone: UTC+01:00 (CET)
  - Summer (DST): UTC+02:00 (CEST)
- INSEE/Postal code: 47150 /47200
- ^{1} French Land Register data, which excludes lakes, ponds, glaciers > 1 km^{2} (0.386 sq mi or 247 acres) and river estuaries.

Longueville (French pronunciation: [lɔ̃ɡvil]; Occitan: Longavila) is a commune in the Lot-et-Garonne department in south-western France.

== See also ==
- Communes of the Lot-et-Garonne department
