= Labretonie =

- Commune
- Coat of arms
- Location of Labretonie
- Location within France Location within Nouvelle-Aquitaine
- Coordinates: 44°29′22″N 0°22′07″E
- Country: France
- Region: Nouvelle-Aquitaine
- Department: Lot-et-Garonne
- Arrondissement: Marmande
- Canton: Tonneins
- Intercommunality: CC Lot et Tolzac

Government
  - Mayor (2020–2026): Nadine Tesson
- Area^{1}: 11.8 km^{2} (4.6 sq mi)
- Elevation: 77 m (253 ft)
- Highest elevation: 138 m (453 ft)
- Lowest elevation: 49 m (161 ft)
- Population (2023): 167
  - Density: 14.2/km^{2} (36.7/sq mi)
- Time zone: UTC+01:00 (CET)
  - Summer (DST): UTC+02:00 (CEST)
- INSEE/Postal code: 47122 /47350
- ^{1} French Land Register data, which excludes lakes, ponds, glaciers > 1 km^{2} (0.386 sq mi or 247 acres) and river estuaries.

Labretonie (French pronunciation: [labʁətɔni]; Occitan: La Bertoniá) is a commune in the Lot-et-Garonne department in south-western France.

== See also ==
- Communes of the Lot-et-Garonne department
