= Val de Garonne Agglomération =

- Communauté d'agglomération
- Interactive map of Val de Garonne Agglomération
- Coordinates: 44°28′N 00°14′E
- Country: France
- Region: Nouvelle-Aquitaine
- Department: Lot-et-Garonne
- No. of communes: {{{nbcomm}}}
- Established: 2011
- Area: 669.2 km^{2} (258.4 sq mi)
- Population (2019): 60,226
  - Density: 90.00/km^{2} (233.1/sq mi)
- Website: www.vg-agglo.com

Val de Garonne Agglomération is the communauté d'agglomération, an intercommunal structure, centred on the town of Marmande. It is located in the Lot-et-Garonne department, in the Nouvelle-Aquitaine region, southwestern France. Created in 2011, its seat is in Marmande. Its area is 669.2 km^{2}. Its population was 60,226 in 2019, of which 17,421 in Marmande proper.

== Composition ==
The communauté d'agglomération consists of the following 43 communes:

1. Agmé
2. Beaupuy
3. Birac-sur-Trec
4. Calonges
5. Castelnau-sur-Gupie
6. Caubon-Saint-Sauveur
7. Caumont-sur-Garonne
8. Clairac
9. Cocumont
10. Couthures-sur-Garonne
11. Escassefort
12. Fauguerolles
13. Fauillet
14. Fourques-sur-Garonne
15. Gaujac
16. Gontaud-de-Nogaret
17. Grateloup-Saint-Gayrand
18. Jusix
19. Lafitte-sur-Lot
20. Lagruère
21. Lagupie
22. Longueville
23. Marcellus
24. Marmande
25. Le Mas-d'Agenais
26. Mauvezin-sur-Gupie
27. Meilhan-sur-Garonne
28. Montpouillan
29. Puymiclan
30. Saint-Avit
31. Saint-Barthélemy-d'Agenais
32. Sainte-Bazeille
33. Saint-Martin-Petit
34. Saint-Pardoux-du-Breuil
35. Saint-Sauveur-de-Meilhan
36. Samazan
37. Sénestis
38. Seyches
39. Taillebourg
40. Tonneins
41. Varès
42. Villeton
43. Virazeil
