= Saint-Pardoux-du-Breuil =

- Commune
- Location of Saint-Pardoux-du-Breuil
- Location within France Location within Nouvelle-Aquitaine
- Coordinates: 44°28′38″N 0°11′38″E
- Country: France
- Region: Nouvelle-Aquitaine
- Department: Lot-et-Garonne
- Arrondissement: Marmande
- Canton: Marmande-2
- Intercommunality: Val de Garonne Agglomération

Government
  - Mayor (2020–2026): Jean-Michel Poignant
- Area^{1}: 7.3 km^{2} (2.8 sq mi)
- Elevation: 32 m (105 ft)
- Highest elevation: 35 m (115 ft)
- Lowest elevation: 19 m (62 ft)
- Population (2023): 633
  - Density: 87/km^{2} (220/sq mi)
- Time zone: UTC+01:00 (CET)
  - Summer (DST): UTC+02:00 (CEST)
- INSEE/Postal code: 47263 /47200
- ^{1} French Land Register data, which excludes lakes, ponds, glaciers > 1 km^{2} (0.386 sq mi or 247 acres) and river estuaries.

Saint-Pardoux-du-Breuil (French pronunciation: [sɛ̃ paʁdu dy bʁœj]; Occitan: Sent Pardol deu Brolh) is a commune in the Lot-et-Garonne department in south-western France.

== See also ==
- Communes of the Lot-et-Garonne department
