= Lafitte-sur-Lot =

- Commune
- Location of Lafitte-sur-Lot
- Location within France Location within Nouvelle-Aquitaine
- Coordinates: 44°21′10″N 0°25′56″E
- Country: France
- Region: Nouvelle-Aquitaine
- Department: Lot-et-Garonne
- Arrondissement: Marmande
- Canton: Tonneins
- Intercommunality: Val de Garonne Agglomération

Government
  - Mayor (2020–2026): Benjamin Fagès
- Area^{1}: 15.99 km^{2} (6.17 sq mi)
- Elevation: 50 m (160 ft)
- Highest elevation: 67 m (220 ft)
- Lowest elevation: 27 m (89 ft)
- Population (2023): 832
  - Density: 52.0/km^{2} (135/sq mi)
- Time zone: UTC+01:00 (CET)
  - Summer (DST): UTC+02:00 (CEST)
- INSEE/Postal code: 47127 /47320
- ^{1} French Land Register data, which excludes lakes, ponds, glaciers > 1 km^{2} (0.386 sq mi or 247 acres) and river estuaries.

Lafitte-sur-Lot (French pronunciation: [lafit syʁ lɔt], literally Lafitte on Lot; Occitan: La Fita) is a commune in the Lot-et-Garonne department in south-western France.

== See also ==
- Communes of the Lot-et-Garonne department
