= Virazeil =

- Commune
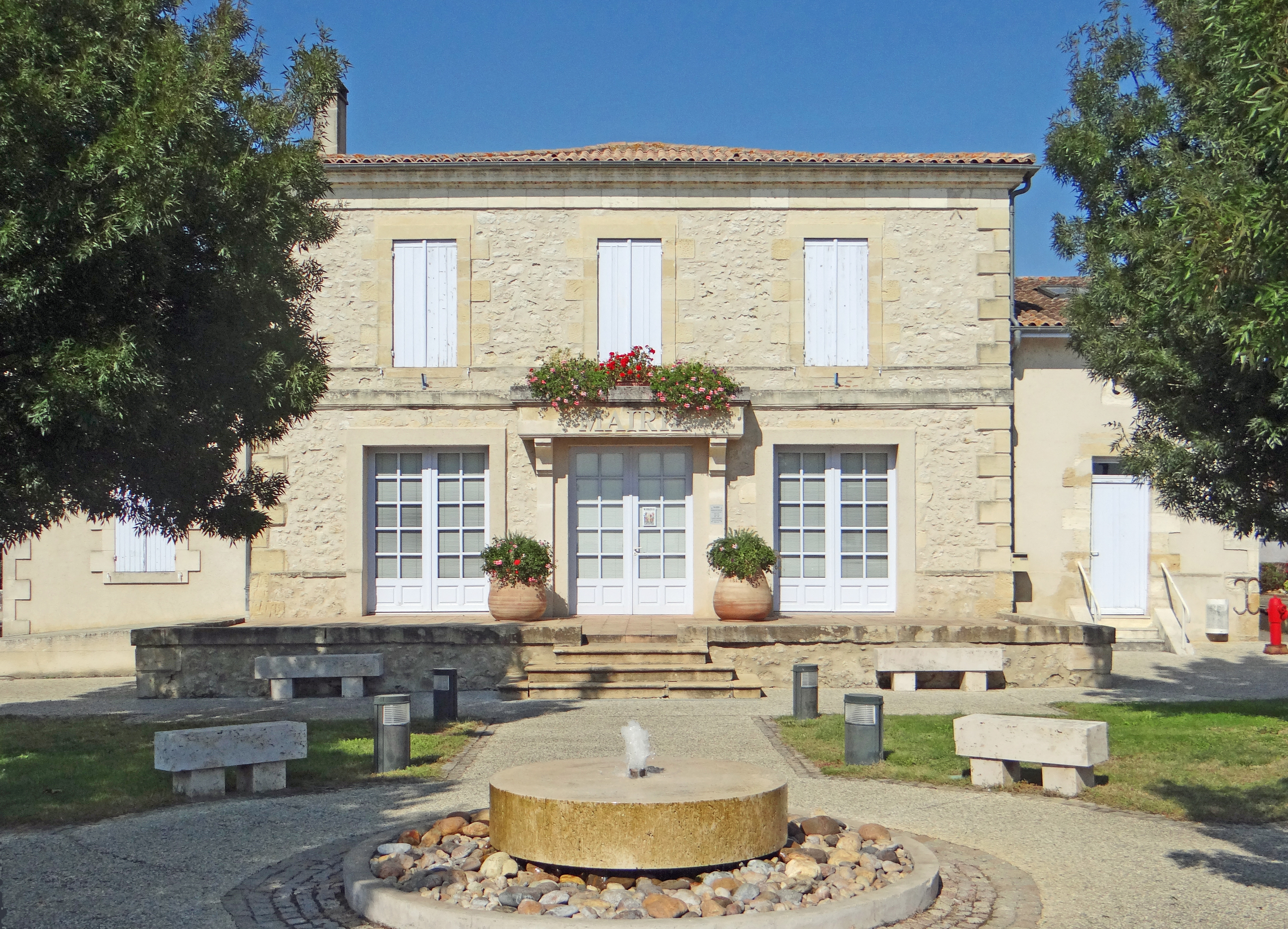
- The town hall in Virazeil
- Location of Virazeil
- Location within France Location within Nouvelle-Aquitaine
- Coordinates: 44°30′22″N 0°13′08″E
- Country: France
- Region: Nouvelle-Aquitaine
- Department: Lot-et-Garonne
- Arrondissement: Marmande
- Canton: Marmande-2
- Intercommunality: Val de Garonne Agglomération

Government
  - Mayor (2020–2026): Christophe Courregelongue
- Area^{1}: 19.87 km^{2} (7.67 sq mi)
- Elevation: 20 m (66 ft)
- Highest elevation: 127 m (417 ft)
- Lowest elevation: 31 m (102 ft)
- Population (2023): 1,715
  - Density: 86.31/km^{2} (223.5/sq mi)
- Time zone: UTC+01:00 (CET)
  - Summer (DST): UTC+02:00 (CEST)
- INSEE/Postal code: 47326 /47200
- ^{1} French Land Register data, which excludes lakes, ponds, glaciers > 1 km^{2} (0.386 sq mi or 247 acres) and river estuaries.

Virazeil (French pronunciation: [viʁazɛj]; Occitan: Viraselh) is a commune in the Lot-et-Garonne department in south-western France.

== See also ==
- Communes of the Lot-et-Garonne department
