= Brugnac =

- Commune
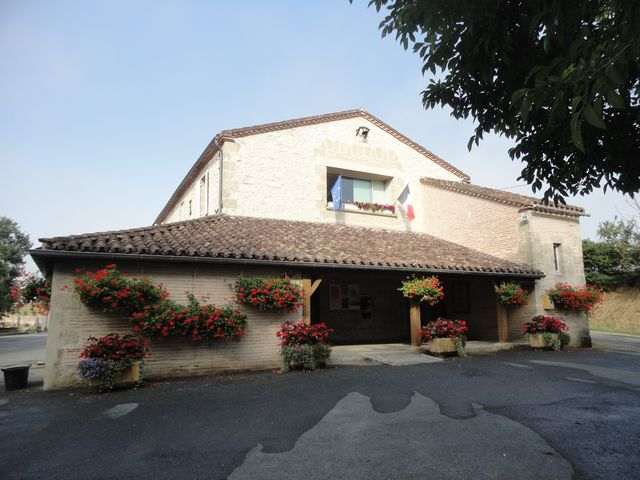
- Location of Brugnac
- Location within France Location within Nouvelle-Aquitaine
- Coordinates: 44°27′06″N 0°27′18″E
- Country: France
- Region: Nouvelle-Aquitaine
- Department: Lot-et-Garonne
- Arrondissement: Marmande
- Canton: Tonneins
- Intercommunality: Lot et Tolzac

Government
  - Mayor (2020–2026): Jacqueline Prevot
- Area^{1}: 14.74 km^{2} (5.69 sq mi)
- Elevation: 150 m (490 ft)
- Highest elevation: 172 m (564 ft)
- Lowest elevation: 49 m (161 ft)
- Population (2023): 180
  - Density: 12/km^{2} (32/sq mi)
- Time zone: UTC+01:00 (CET)
  - Summer (DST): UTC+02:00 (CEST)
- INSEE/Postal code: 47042 /47260
- ^{1} French Land Register data, which excludes lakes, ponds, glaciers > 1 km^{2} (0.386 sq mi or 247 acres) and river estuaries.

Brugnac (French pronunciation: [bʁyɲak]; Occitan: Brunhac) is a commune in the Lot-et-Garonne department in southwestern France.

== Population ==
Historical population
Year	Pop.	±% p.a.
1968	225	—
1975	203	−1.46%
1982	178	−1.86%
1990	190	+0.82%
1999	167	−1.42%
2007	186	+1.36%
2012	193	+0.74%
2017	183	−1.06%
2023	180	−0.28%
Source: INSEE

== See also ==
- Communes of the Lot-et-Garonne department
