= Clairac =

- Commune
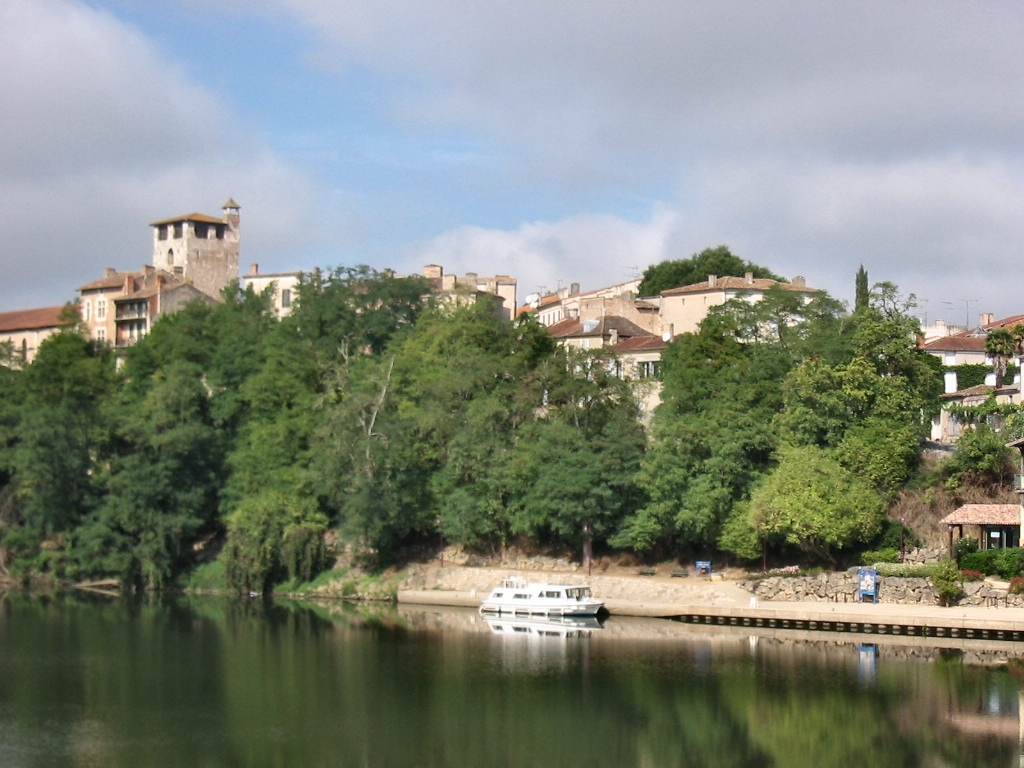
- A general view of Clairac

- Coat of arms
- Location of Clairac
- Location within France Location within Nouvelle-Aquitaine
- Coordinates: 44°21′38″N 0°22′47″E
- Country: France
- Region: Nouvelle-Aquitaine
- Department: Lot-et-Garonne
- Arrondissement: Marmande
- Canton: Tonneins
- Intercommunality: Val de Garonne Agglomération

Government
  - Mayor (2020–2026): Michel Perat
- Area^{1}: 33.78 km^{2} (13.04 sq mi)
- Elevation: 54 m (177 ft)
- Highest elevation: 185 m (607 ft)
- Lowest elevation: 27 m (89 ft)
- Population (2023): 2,606
  - Density: 77.15/km^{2} (199.8/sq mi)
- Time zone: UTC+01:00 (CET)
  - Summer (DST): UTC+02:00 (CEST)
- INSEE/Postal code: 47065 /47320
- ^{1} French Land Register data, which excludes lakes, ponds, glaciers > 1 km^{2} (0.386 sq mi or 247 acres) and river estuaries.

Clairac (French pronunciation: [klɛʁak]; Occitan: [klajˈɾak]) is a commune in the Lot-et-Garonne department in south-western France.

== Population ==
Historical population
Year	Pop.	±% p.a.
1968	2,552	—
1975	2,332	−1.28%
1982	2,393	+0.37%
1990	2,338	−0.29%
1999	2,385	+0.22%
2007	2,464	+0.41%
2012	2,505	+0.33%
2017	2,622	+0.92%
2023	2,606	−0.10%
Source: INSEE

== People ==
Clairac is the birthplace of the 17th century poet and dramatist Théophile de Viau and of François de Labat.

== See also ==
- Communes of the Lot-et-Garonne department
