= Birac-sur-Trec =

- Commune
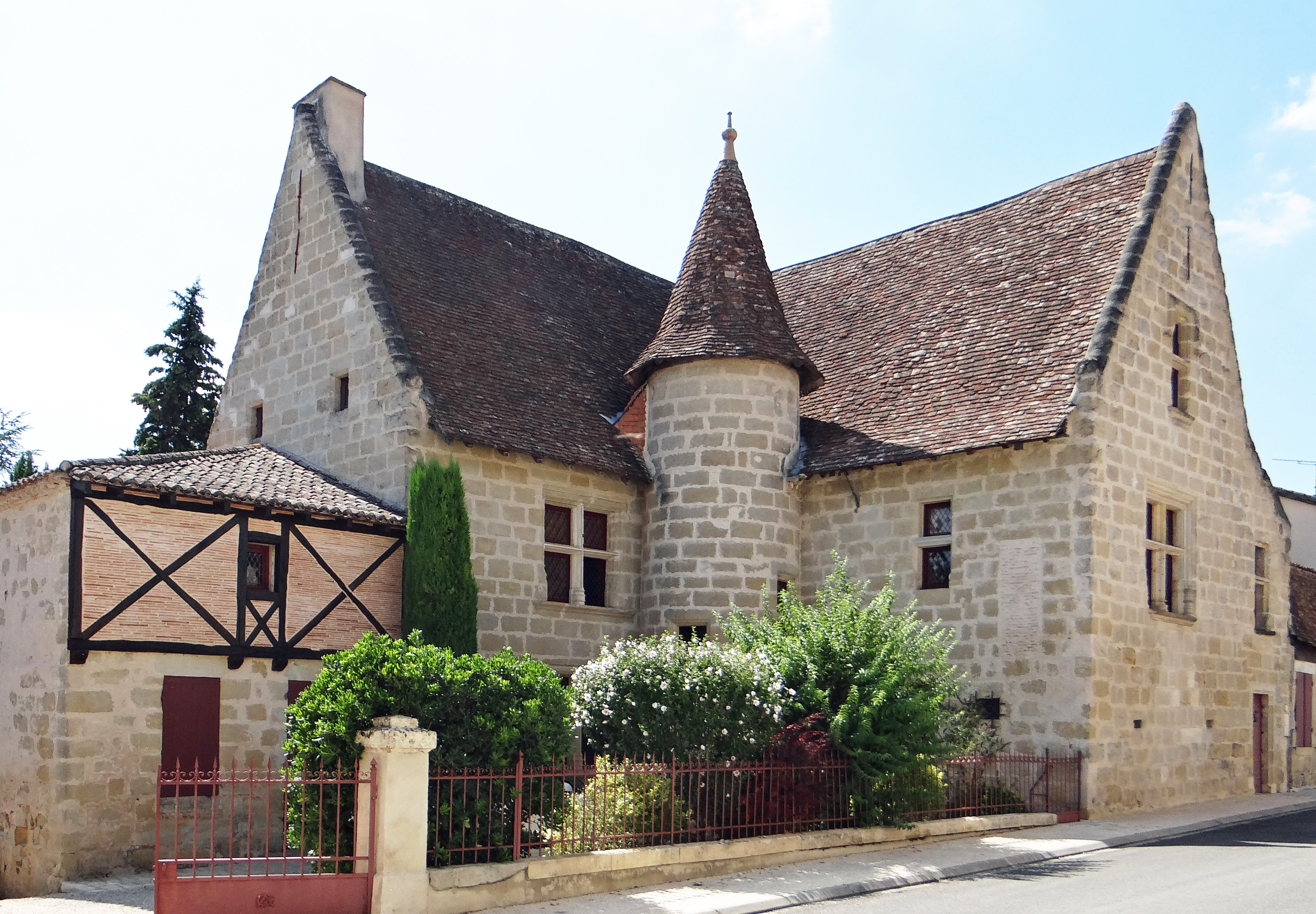
- Location of Birac-sur-Trec
- Location within France Location within Nouvelle-Aquitaine
- Coordinates: 44°29′13″N 0°15′55″E
- Country: France
- Region: Nouvelle-Aquitaine
- Department: Lot-et-Garonne
- Arrondissement: Marmande
- Canton: Marmande-2
- Intercommunality: Val de Garonne Agglomération

Government
  - Mayor (2020–2026): Alain Lerdu
- Area^{1}: 14.34 km^{2} (5.54 sq mi)
- Elevation: 50 m (160 ft)
- Highest elevation: 129 m (423 ft)
- Lowest elevation: 28 m (92 ft)
- Population (2023): 812
  - Density: 56.6/km^{2} (147/sq mi)
- Time zone: UTC+01:00 (CET)
  - Summer (DST): UTC+02:00 (CEST)
- INSEE/Postal code: 47028 /47200
- ^{1} French Land Register data, which excludes lakes, ponds, glaciers > 1 km^{2} (0.386 sq mi or 247 acres) and river estuaries.

Birac-sur-Trec (French pronunciation: [biʁak syʁ tʁɛk]; Occitan: Virac) is a commune in the Lot-et-Garonne department in southwestern France.

== Population ==
Historical population
Year	Pop.	±% p.a.
1968	617	—
1975	590	−0.64%
1982	628	+0.90%
1990	636	+0.16%
1999	672	+0.61%
2007	774	+1.78%
2012	822	+1.21%
2017	843	+0.51%
2023	812	−0.62%
Source: INSEE

== See also ==
- Communes of the Lot-et-Garonne department
