= Gaujac, Lot-et-Garonne =

Gaujac
- Commune
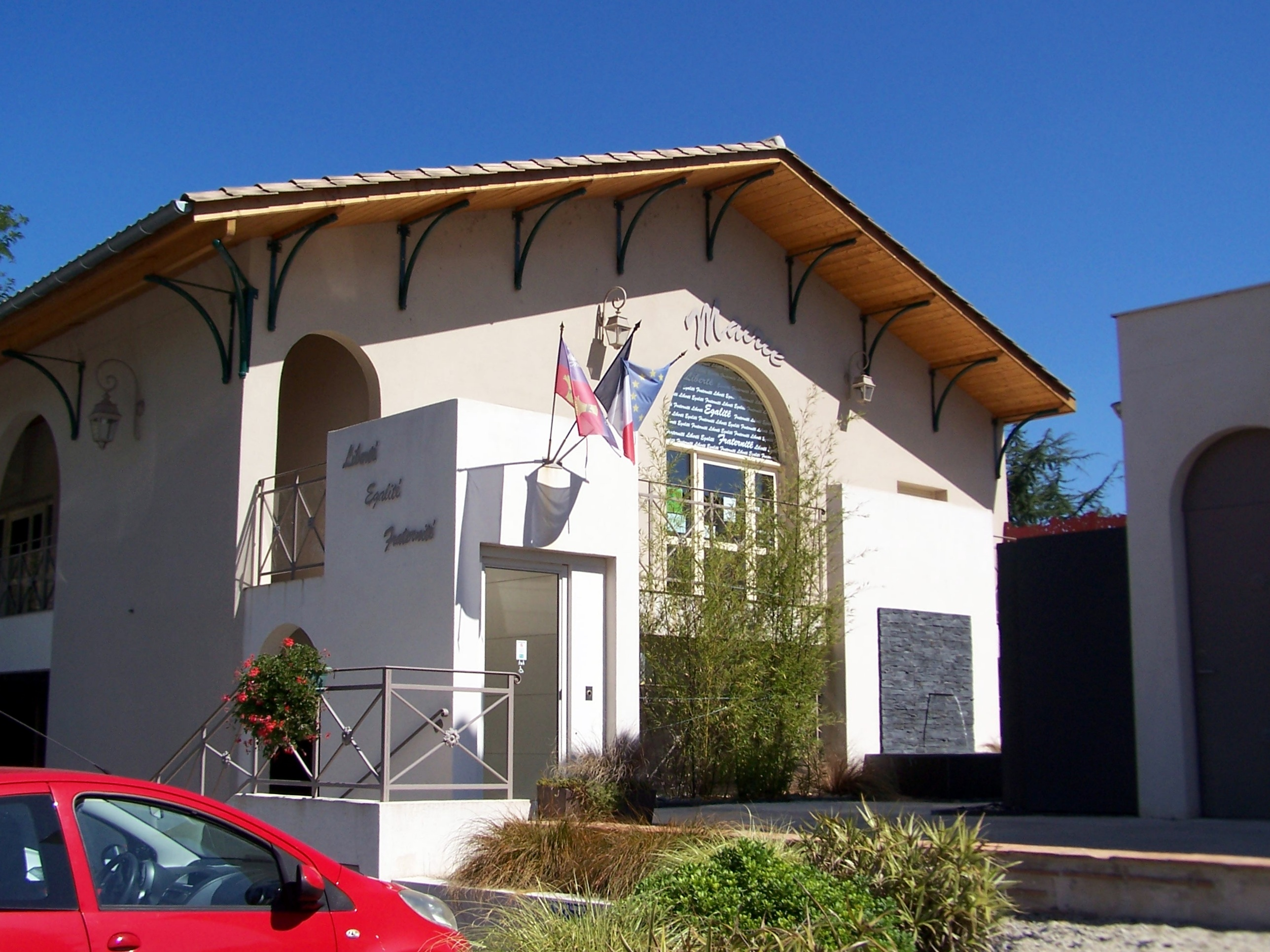
- The town hall in Gaujac
- Location of Gaujac
- Location within France Location within Nouvelle-Aquitaine
- Coordinates: 44°29′26″N 0°06′41″E
- Country: France
- Region: Nouvelle-Aquitaine
- Department: Lot-et-Garonne
- Arrondissement: Marmande
- Canton: Marmande-1
- Intercommunality: Val de Garonne Agglomération

Government
  - Mayor (2020–2026): Jean-François Thoumazeau
- Area^{1}: 7.33 km^{2} (2.83 sq mi)
- Elevation: 6 m (20 ft)
- Highest elevation: 22 m (72 ft)
- Lowest elevation: 13 m (43 ft)
- Population (2023): 241
  - Density: 32.9/km^{2} (85.2/sq mi)
- Time zone: UTC+01:00 (CET)
  - Summer (DST): UTC+02:00 (CEST)
- INSEE/Postal code: 47108 /47200
- ^{1} French Land Register data, which excludes lakes, ponds, glaciers > 1 km^{2} (0.386 sq mi or 247 acres) and river estuaries.

Gaujac (French pronunciation: [ɡoʒak]) is a commune in the Lot-et-Garonne department in south-western France.

== See also ==
- Communes of the Lot-et-Garonne department
