= What's Cooking? (Australian TV series) =

- Genre: cooking
- Presented by: Gabriel Gaté (1991-1993); Colette Mann (1993); Geoff Jansz (1993-1999); Kerri-Anne Kennerley (1999)
- Country of origin: Australia
- Original language: English
- No. of seasons: 9
- No. of episodes: 750+

Production
- Running time: 30 minutes

Original release
- Network: Nine Network
- Release: 1 July 1991 – 25 November 1999

What's Cooking? was an Australian cooking television series, that aired on the Nine Network from 1991 to 1999.

== Hosts ==
It was originally hosted by chef Gabriel Gaté and television actress Colette Mann until 1993 when production cuts forced the hosts to leave the program. Geoff Jansz took over in 1993. In 1999, Kerri-Anne Kennerley co-hosted the show with Jansz.
