= Laparade =

- Commune
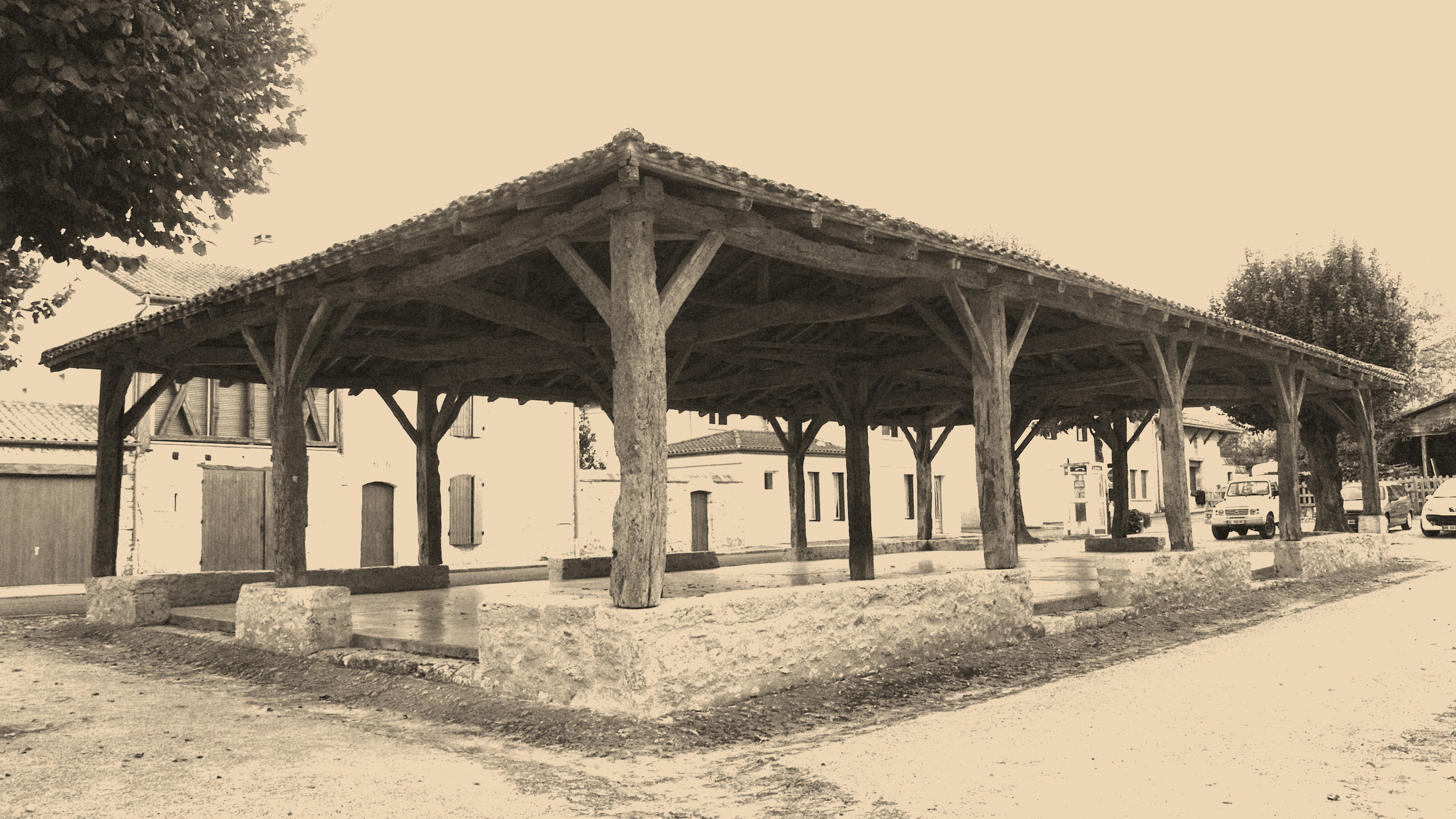
- The covered marketplace in Laparade

- Coat of arms
- Location of Laparade
- Location within France Location within Nouvelle-Aquitaine
- Coordinates: 44°23′21″N 0°26′55″E
- Country: France
- Region: Nouvelle-Aquitaine
- Department: Lot-et-Garonne
- Arrondissement: Marmande
- Canton: Tonneins
- Intercommunality: Lot et Tolzac

Government
  - Mayor (2020–2026): Ghislain Gozzerino
- Area^{1}: 16.22 km^{2} (6.26 sq mi)
- Elevation: 190 m (620 ft)
- Highest elevation: 192 m (630 ft)
- Lowest elevation: 32 m (105 ft)
- Population (2023): 395
  - Density: 24.4/km^{2} (63.1/sq mi)
- Time zone: UTC+01:00 (CET)
  - Summer (DST): UTC+02:00 (CEST)
- INSEE/Postal code: 47135 /47260
- ^{1} French Land Register data, which excludes lakes, ponds, glaciers > 1 km^{2} (0.386 sq mi or 247 acres) and river estuaries.

Laparade (French pronunciation: [lapaʁad]; Occitan: La Parada) is a commune in the Lot-et-Garonne department in south-western France.

== See also ==
- Communes of the Lot-et-Garonne department
