= Lyndey and Blair's Taste of Greece =

- Country of origin: Australia
- Original language: English
- No. of seasons: 1
- No. of episodes: 7

Original release
- Network: SBS One
- Release: 2011

Lyndey and Blair's Taste of Greece is an Australian television series first screened on SBS One in 2011. The series follows Lyndey Milan and her son Blair as they tour Greece. Before the series had screened, Blair Milan died from acute myeloid leukemia.

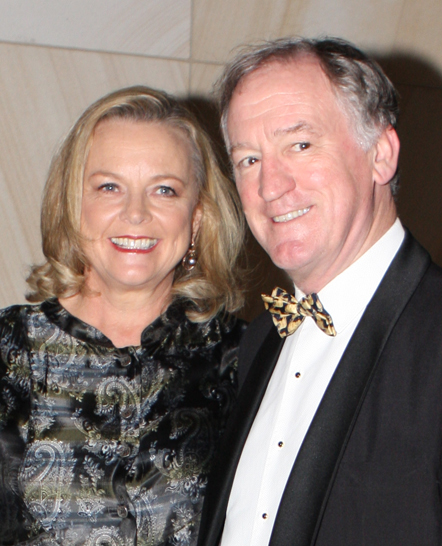
Hostess Lyndey Milan (pictured with partner John Caldon)

== Episode guide ==
Episode	Places
Episode 1	Athens
Episode 2	Corinth
Episode 3	Nafplio
Episode 4	Monemvasia & Kythira
Episode 5	Inner Mani
Episode 6	Outer Mani
Episode 7	Olympia
