= Couthures-sur-Garonne =

- Commune
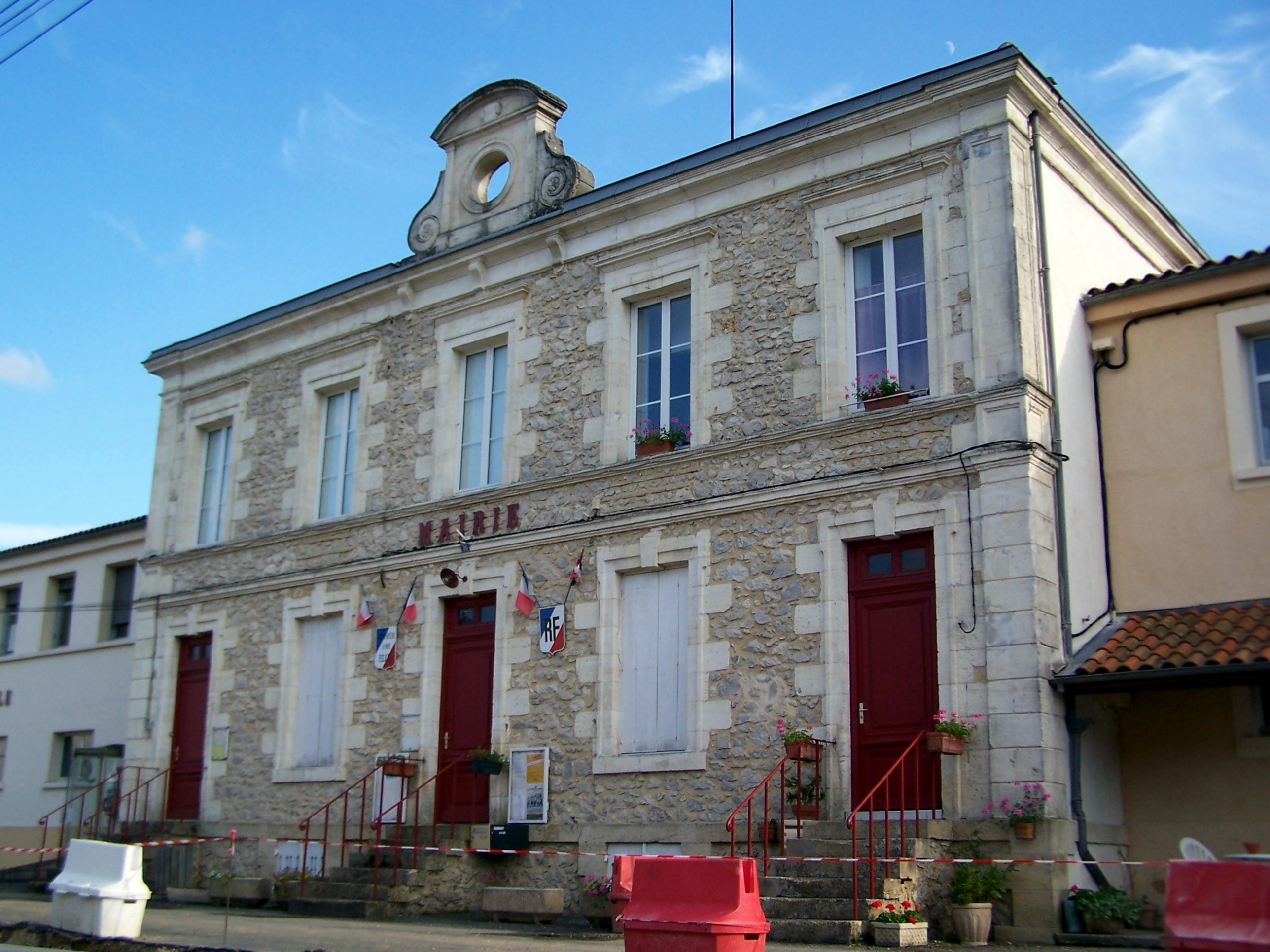
- The town hall in Couthures-sur-Garonne
- Location of Couthures-sur-Garonne
- Location within France Location within Nouvelle-Aquitaine
- Coordinates: 44°30′52″N 0°04′45″E
- Country: France
- Region: Nouvelle-Aquitaine
- Department: Lot-et-Garonne
- Arrondissement: Marmande
- Canton: Marmande-1
- Intercommunality: Val de Garonne Agglomération

Government
  - Mayor (2020–2026): Jean-Michel Moreau
- Area^{1}: 6.98 km^{2} (2.69 sq mi)
- Elevation: 17 m (56 ft)
- Highest elevation: 22 m (72 ft)
- Lowest elevation: 12 m (39 ft)
- Population (2023): 365
  - Density: 52.3/km^{2} (135/sq mi)
- Time zone: UTC+01:00 (CET)
  - Summer (DST): UTC+02:00 (CEST)
- INSEE/Postal code: 47074 /47180
- ^{1} French Land Register data, which excludes lakes, ponds, glaciers > 1 km^{2} (0.386 sq mi or 247 acres) and river estuaries.

Couthures-sur-Garonne (French pronunciation: [kutyʁ syʁ ɡaʁɔn]; Occitan: Coturas de Garòna) is a commune in the Lot-et-Garonne department, southwestern France.

== See also ==
- Communes of the Lot-et-Garonne department
