= Taillebourg, Lot-et-Garonne =

Taillebourg
- Commune
- Location of Taillebourg
- Location within France Location within Nouvelle-Aquitaine
- Coordinates: 44°26′52″N 0°12′34″E
- Country: France
- Region: Nouvelle-Aquitaine
- Department: Lot-et-Garonne
- Arrondissement: Marmande
- Canton: Marmande-2
- Intercommunality: Val de Garonne Agglomération

Government
  - Mayor (2020–2026): Denis Duteil
- Area^{1}: 7.11 km^{2} (2.75 sq mi)
- Elevation: 12 m (39 ft)
- Highest elevation: 25 m (82 ft)
- Lowest elevation: 17 m (56 ft)
- Population (2023): 67
  - Density: 9.4/km^{2} (24/sq mi)
- Time zone: UTC+01:00 (CET)
  - Summer (DST): UTC+02:00 (CEST)
- INSEE/Postal code: 47304 /47200
- ^{1} French Land Register data, which excludes lakes, ponds, glaciers > 1 km^{2} (0.386 sq mi or 247 acres) and river estuaries.

Taillebourg (French pronunciation: [tajbuʁ]) is a commune in the Lot-et-Garonne department in south-western France.

== See also ==
- Communes of the Lot-et-Garonne department
