= Geoff Jansz =

Australian chef

Geoff Jansz (born 1958) is a Sri Lankan-born Australian chef and television presenter.

== Career ==
After graduating from the University of Sydney with a Bachelor of Pharmacy in 1984, Geoff Jansz first worked as a pharmacist. He later opened a restaurant in Picton, New South Wales. His first television appearance was as a food presenter on EveryBody in 1992 with the Australian Broadcasting Corporation, an early programme in the lifestyle genre.

Jansz's first notable television role came later in 1992 as a presenter on the Nine Network's What's Cooking, which he hosted from 1993 until its conclusion in 1999. In 1995 he débuted on the Burke's Backyard, in which he made a guest appearance, then presented a regular weekly segment until its end in 2004. He also hosted the daytime cooking programme Fresh with the Australian Women's Weekly.

Jansz was a regular contributor to the Australian Gourmet Traveller between 1987 and 1992. He has written three books: Taking The Freshest Approach, Favourite Recipes and Geoff Jansz Desserts.

In 2007, Jansz was a Host Chef at the Great Barrier Feast Culinary Masterclass event on Hamilton Island which was hosted by Curtis Stone and featured other notable Australian chefs, Shannon Bennett, Justin North.
