= Blair Milan =

Australian actor, television presenter and voice over (1981–2011)

- Born: 25 June 1981
- Died: 17 April 2011 (aged 29); Camperdown, Sydney
- Education: Bachelor of Communication (Theatre/Media)
- Alma mater: Charles Sturt University
- Occupations: Actor, television presenter
- Years active: 1995–2011
- Television: Lyndey & Blair's Taste of Greece; Nickelodeon's Coast to Coast
- Parent(s): Nigel Milan; Lyndey Milan

Blair Milan (25 June 1981 – 17 April 2011) was an Australian actor, television presenter and voice over. He appeared in programs such as Home and Away and All Saints, and was a presenter for Nickelodeon's Coast to Coast and the Go! channel.

Milan had recently completed filming Lyndey and Blair's Taste of Greece with his mother, Lyndey Milan, when he was diagnosed with acute myeloid leukaemia. He died on 17 April 2011, at age 29.

Following his death, the Theatre/Media Foundation of Charles Sturt University established the Blair Milan Fund to support a scholarship that encourages final year students of the faculty to demonstrate optimism, enthusiasm and a passion for their chosen field; and to support a touring production for the presentation of the work of final year faculty students before metropolitan and/or regional communities.
