= François de Labat =

French economist

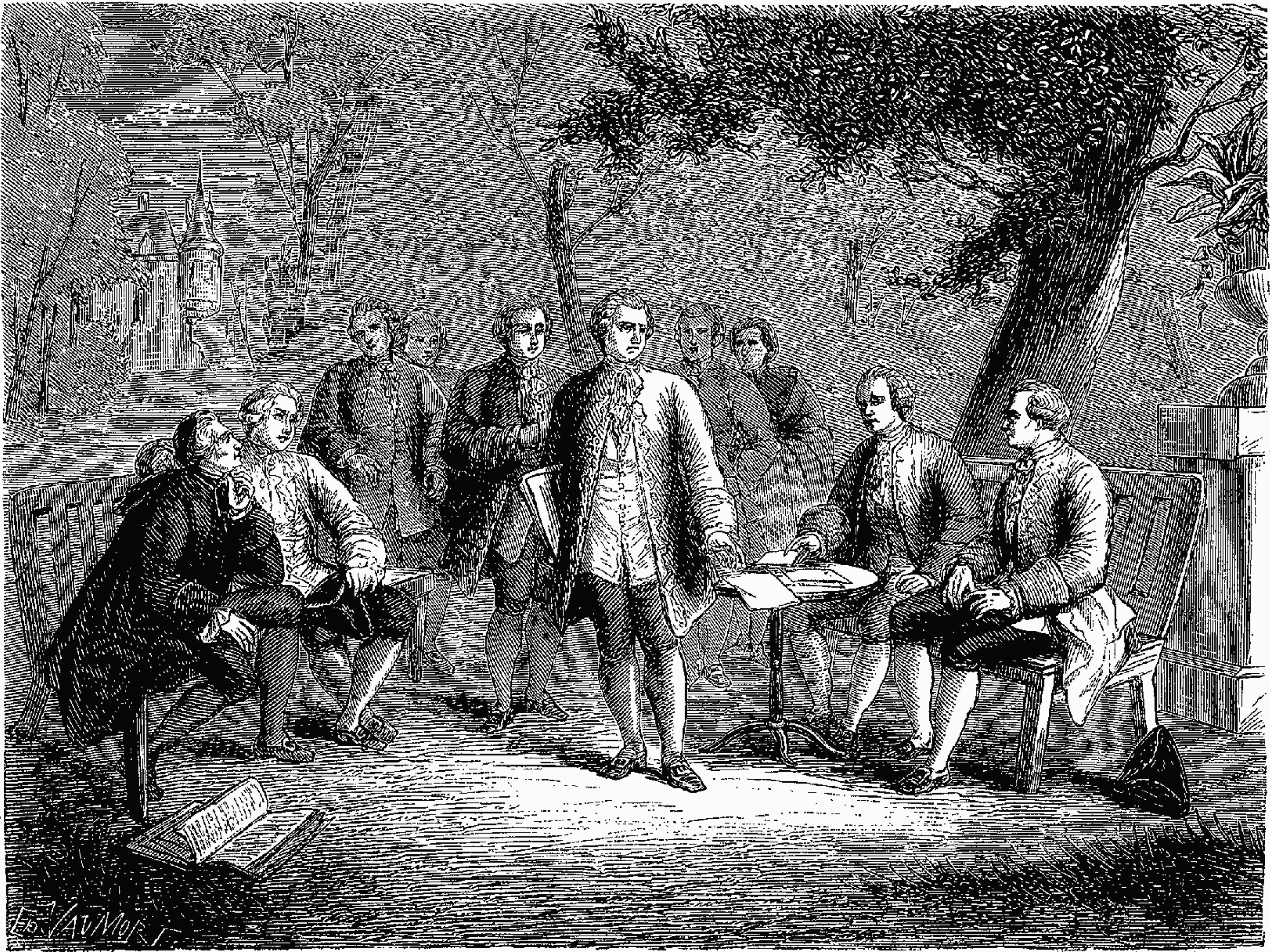
T1- d539 - Fig. 270. — Le cénacle scientifique du château de Clairac; Montesquieu et le Baron de Secondat, son fils, le chevalier de Vivens, Romas et les frères Dutilh

François de Labat (1697–1780) was a French economist.
