= Canton of Tonneins =

Coordinates: 44.39°N 0.31°E

The canton of Tonneins is an administrative division of the Lot-et-Garonne department, southwestern France. Its borders were modified at the French canton reorganisation which came into effect in March 2015. Its seat is in Tonneins.

It consists of the following communes:

1. Brugnac
2. Castelmoron-sur-Lot
3. Clairac
4. Coulx
5. Fauillet
6. Grateloup-Saint-Gayrand
7. Hautesvignes
8. Labretonie
9. Lafitte-sur-Lot
10. Laparade
11. Tonneins
12. Varès
13. Verteuil-d'Agenais
