= José Antonio Melián =

Argentine colonel

Coronel José Antonio Melián
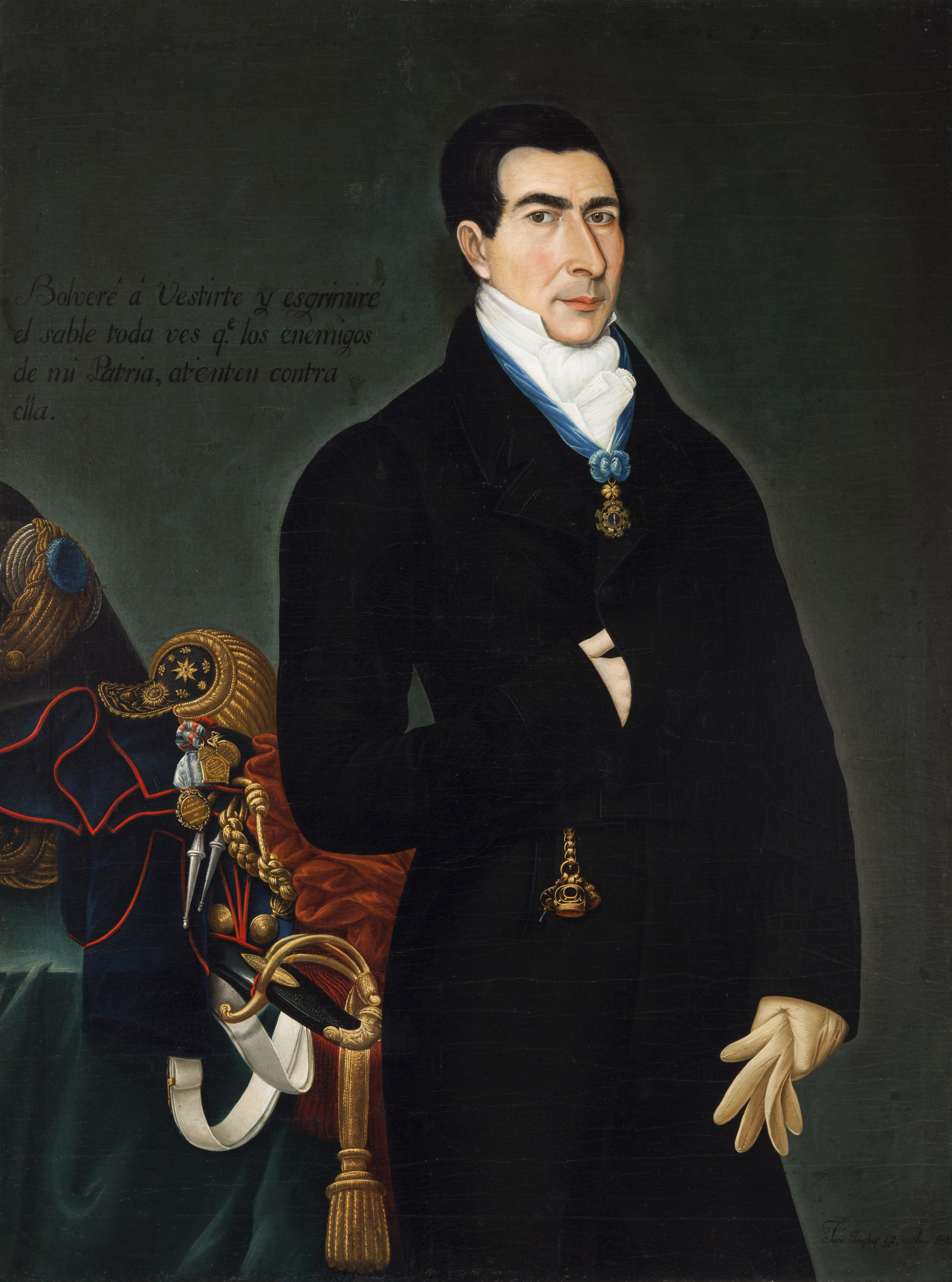
- Portrait by José Gil de Castro, 1819

Personal details
- Born: José Antonio Melián y Correa; 1784 Buenos Aires, Argentina
- Died: 1857 (aged 72–73) Buenos Aires, Argentina
- Resting place: Cementerio de Flores
- Spouse: Carmen Ureta

Military service
- Allegiance: Spain (until 1810) (Argentina) United Provinces of the River Plate
- Branch/service: Argentine Army
- Years of service: 1800–1818
- Rank: Colonel
- Commands: Húsares of Pueyrredón; Mounted Grenadiers Regiment
- Battles/wars: Battle of Puente Gálvez; May Revolution; Battle of Paraguarí; Battle of Tacuarí; Battle of Cerrito; Battle of Rincón; Battle of Guayabos; Battle of Chacabuco; Battle of Curapalihue; Battle of Cancha Rayada; Battle of Maipú

José Antonio Melián (19 March 1784 – 1 December 1857) was an Argentine colonel. He fought against the British Invasions of the Río de la Plata, and fought alongside José de San Martín in the Argentine War of Independence.

He was born in Buenos Aires, the son of Tomás Antonio Melián y Betancourt and María Josefa Correa y Lescano, belonging to a noble family of Sevillian and Creole origin. He was married in Santiago to Carmen Ureta, the daughter of Santiago de Ureta and Mercedes de la Banda, belonging to a distinguished Chilean family.
