= Lyndey Milan =

Australian media personality

Lyndey Milan OAM
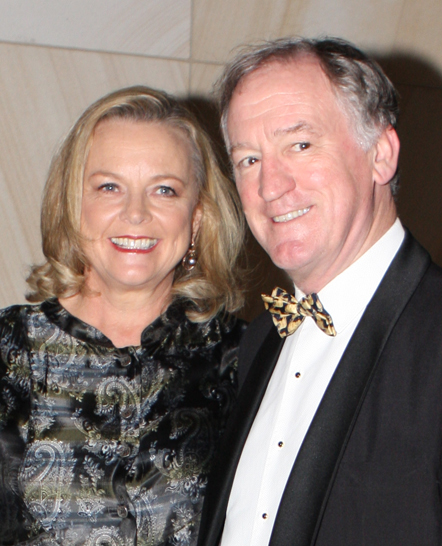
- Milan and her partner, John Caldon, in 2012
- Education: Bachelor of Arts (double major in Fine Arts and History) Diploma of Education
- Alma mater: Sydney University
- Occupations: Television presenter, chef, producer
- Years active: 1985–present
- Spouse: Nigel Milan (former husband)
- Partner: John Caldon
- Children: Blair Milan
- Website: www.lyndeymilan.com

Lyndey Milan is an Australian media personality. She was co-host on the channel 9 show Fresh with the Australian Women's Weekly and she was the Food Director for The Australian Women's Weekly.

Milan attended Wenona School in North Sydney, New South Wales. She was the mother of actor/television presenter Blair Milan. They had recently completed filming Lyndey and Blair's Taste of Greece when Blair was diagnosed with acute myeloid leukaemia. He died on 17 April 2011, at age 29.

== Recognition ==
In 2014, Milan was awarded a Medal of the Order of Australia (OAM) for her "services to hospitality, particularly to the food and wine industry, and to the community".
