= Fauguerolles =

- Commune
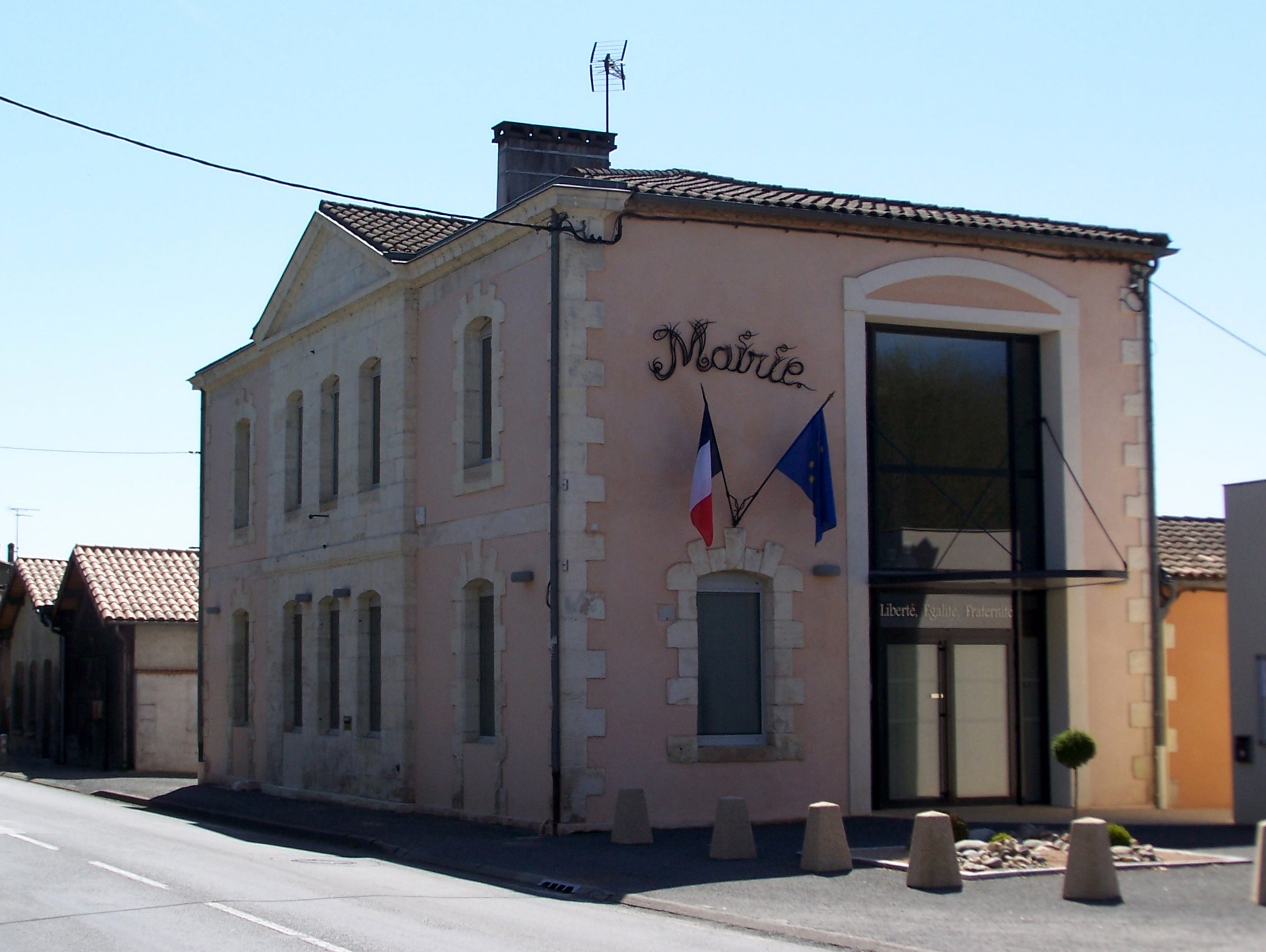
- Fauguerolles Town hall
- Location of Fauguerolles
- Location within France Location within Nouvelle-Aquitaine
- Coordinates: 44°26′29″N 0°15′00″E
- Country: France
- Region: Nouvelle-Aquitaine
- Department: Lot-et-Garonne
- Arrondissement: Marmande
- Canton: Marmande-2
- Intercommunality: Val de Garonne Agglomération

Government
  - Mayor (2020–2026): Maryline de Parscau
- Area^{1}: 6.93 km^{2} (2.68 sq mi)
- Elevation: 33 m (108 ft)
- Highest elevation: 36 m (118 ft)
- Lowest elevation: 21 m (69 ft)
- Population (2023): 822
  - Density: 119/km^{2} (307/sq mi)
- Time zone: UTC+01:00 (CET)
  - Summer (DST): UTC+02:00 (CEST)
- INSEE/Postal code: 47094 /47400
- ^{1} French Land Register data, which excludes lakes, ponds, glaciers > 1 km^{2} (0.386 sq mi or 247 acres) and river estuaries.

Fauguerolles (French pronunciation: [foɡʁɔl]; Occitan: Heugaròlas) is a commune in the Lot-et-Garonne department in south-western France.

== See also ==
- Communes of the Lot-et-Garonne department
