= Fourques-sur-Garonne =

- Commune
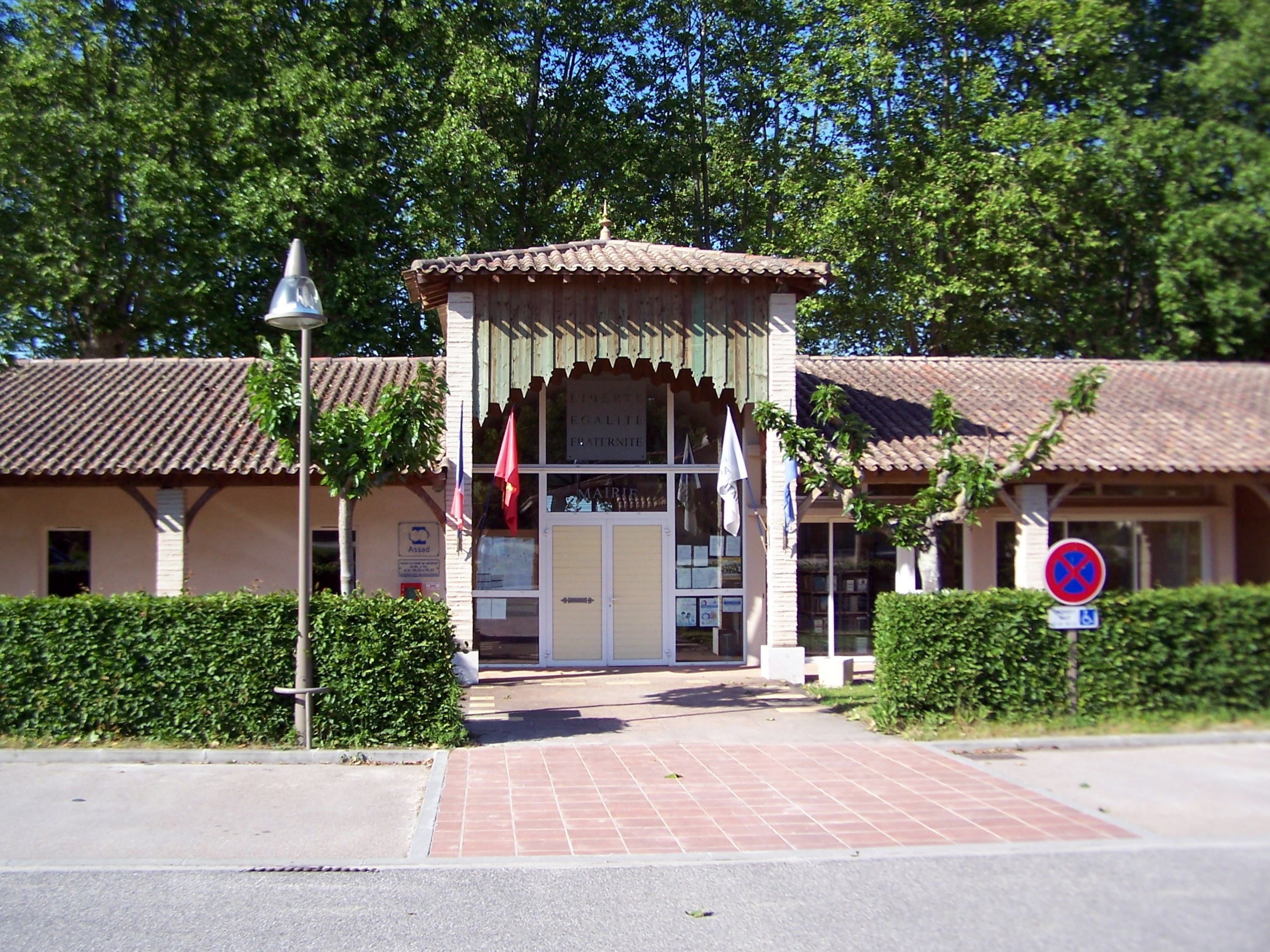
- The town hall in Fourques-sur-Garonne

- Coat of arms
- Location of Fourques-sur-Garonne
- Location within France Location within Nouvelle-Aquitaine
- Coordinates: 44°26′59″N 0°09′32″E
- Country: France
- Region: Nouvelle-Aquitaine
- Department: Lot-et-Garonne
- Arrondissement: Marmande
- Canton: Marmande-2
- Intercommunality: Val de Garonne Agglomération

Government
  - Mayor (2020–2026): Jacques Bilirit
- Area^{1}: 13.96 km^{2} (5.39 sq mi)
- Elevation: 28 m (92 ft)
- Highest elevation: 77 m (253 ft)
- Lowest elevation: 18 m (59 ft)
- Population (2023): 1,293
  - Density: 92.62/km^{2} (239.9/sq mi)
- Time zone: UTC+01:00 (CET)
  - Summer (DST): UTC+02:00 (CEST)
- INSEE/Postal code: 47101 /47200
- ^{1} French Land Register data, which excludes lakes, ponds, glaciers > 1 km^{2} (0.386 sq mi or 247 acres) and river estuaries.

Fourques-sur-Garonne (French pronunciation: [fuʁk syʁ ɡaʁɔn], literally Fourques on Garonne; Occitan: Horcas) is a commune in the Lot-et-Garonne department in south-western France.

== See also ==
- Communes of the Lot-et-Garonne department
