= Meilhan-sur-Garonne =

- Commune
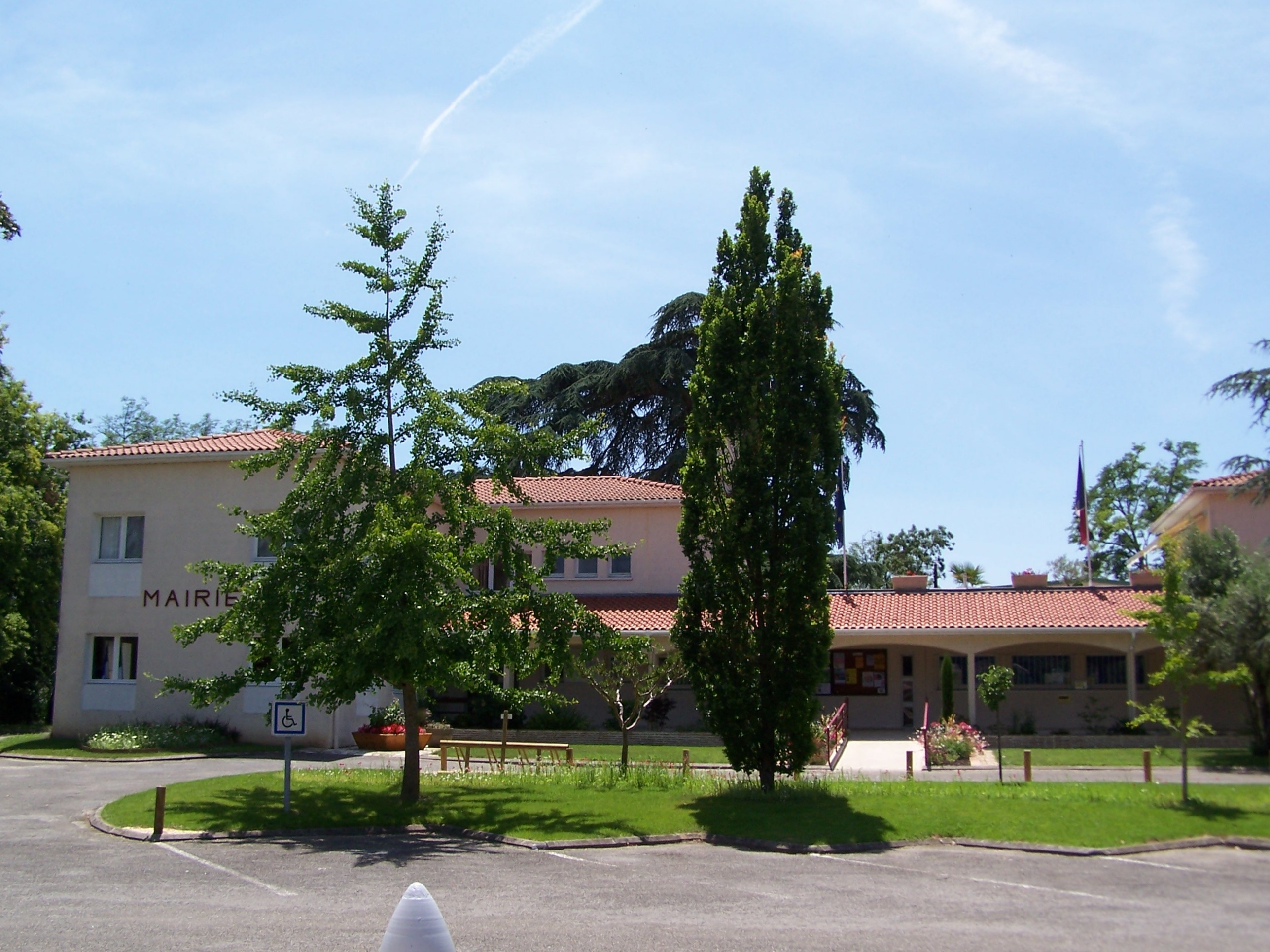
- The town hall in Meilhan-sur-Garonne

- Coat of arms
- Location of Meilhan-sur-Garonne
- Location within France Location within Nouvelle-Aquitaine
- Coordinates: 44°31′20″N 0°02′04″E
- Country: France
- Region: Nouvelle-Aquitaine
- Department: Lot-et-Garonne
- Arrondissement: Marmande
- Canton: Marmande-1
- Intercommunality: Val de Garonne Agglomération

Government
  - Mayor (2020–2026): Régine Povéda
- Area^{1}: 28.62 km^{2} (11.05 sq mi)
- Elevation: 55 m (180 ft)
- Highest elevation: 90 m (300 ft)
- Lowest elevation: 12 m (39 ft)
- Population (2023): 1,326
  - Density: 46.33/km^{2} (120.0/sq mi)
- Time zone: UTC+01:00 (CET)
  - Summer (DST): UTC+02:00 (CEST)
- INSEE/Postal code: 47165 /47180
- ^{1} French Land Register data, which excludes lakes, ponds, glaciers > 1 km^{2} (0.386 sq mi or 247 acres) and river estuaries.

Meilhan-sur-Garonne (French pronunciation: [mɛjɑ̃ syʁ ɡaʁɔn], literally Meilhan on Garonne; Meilhan before 1919; Occitan: Milhan) is a commune in the Lot-et-Garonne department in south-western France.

== See also ==
- Communes of the Lot-et-Garonne department
