= GR 400 =

Walking route in France

- Length: 133Km as a single tour; total of circuits 176Km
- Location: France (Massif Central)
- Designation: GR footpath
- Trailheads: Murat, Super-Lioran, Mandailles-Saint-Julien, Le Falgoux, Le Claux
- Use: Hiking
- Highest point: 1855m (Plomb du Cantal)
- Lowest point: 892m (Murat railway station)
- Difficulty: moderate
- Season: Summer and autumn
- Months: May/June to November
- Sights: Plomb du Cantal, Puy Mary, Puy Griou
- Hazards: One rocky section (la Brêche de Roland) requires use of hands and feet

The GR 400 is a long-distance walking route within the Grande Randonnée network in France. It is not a linear route, but a series of five circuits, all within the Monts de Cantal area of the Massif Central. The circuits interconnect with, and sometimes follow the same route as, the GR 4, one of the spine paths of the network, and also with a subsidiary section of the Via Podiensis St James's Way route. The walking is described as "within the range of any good hiker accustomed to walking in mountain country and to carrying a rucksack"

The five circuits are:

- Alagnon valley loop, starting and finishing at Murat (44 km)
- Cère valley loop, starting and finishing at Super-Lioran (39 km)
- Jordanne valley loop, starting and finishing at Mandailles-Saint-Julien (35 km)
- Le Falgoux loop, starting and finishing at Le Falgooux (39 km)
- Le Claux valley loop, starting and finishing at Le Claux (19 km)

Parts of these loops, together with sections of the GR4, can be combined to create a complete tour of the Monts du Cantal volcanic region, totalling 133 km and suggested as an 8-day walk. The routes include some of the highest and most dramatic points within the Cantal volcano area, including the Plomb du Cantal (1855 m, the highest point on the path and the second highest in the Massif Central), Puy Mary and Puy Griou
