= Fanum d'Aron =

Romano-Celtic temple in Aurillac, France

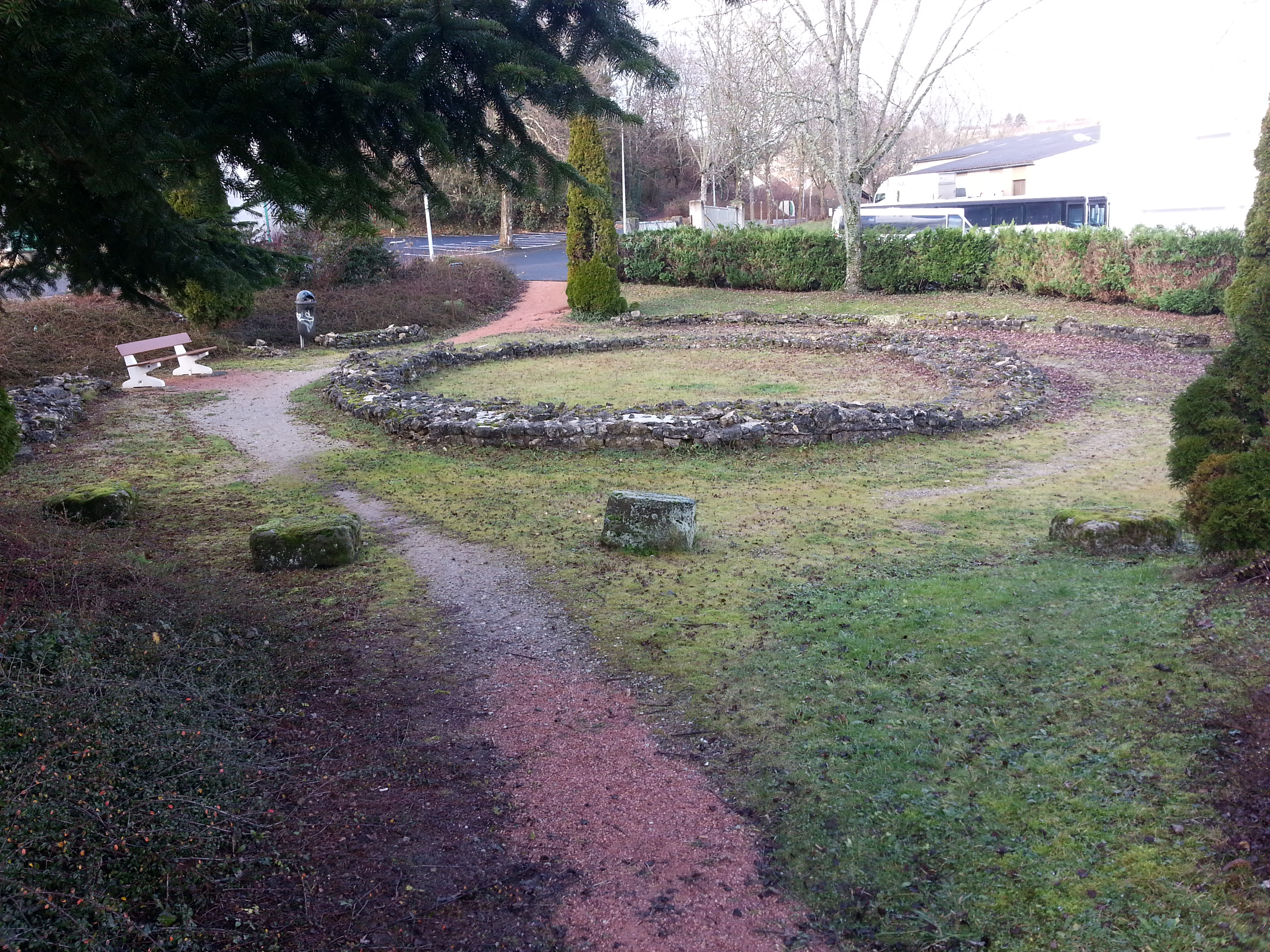
- The ruins of Fanum d'Aron, c. 2014

- Location within France
- 44°55′11″N 2°26′08″E
- Type: Fanum (Romano-Celtic Temple)
- Periods: Classical Antiquity
- Cultures: Arverni, Gallo-Roman
- Location: Aurillac, Cantal, Auvergne-Rhône-Alpes, France
- Region: Auvergne

History
- Built: 1st century CE
- Abandoned: 3rd century CE

Site notes
- Elevation: 639 m (2,096 ft)
- Diameter: approx. 18 m (59 ft)
- Excavation dates: 1977 - 1978
- Condition: Ruined
- Owner: Private

Monument historique
- Designated: 20 November 1980

Fanum d'Aron is a fanum, or Romano-Celtic temple, located in Aurillac, a French commune in the Auvergne region.

== Site and status ==
Discovered in 1970 in the southwest of Aurillac, the temple was excavated from May 1977 through the end of 1978 and added to the monuments historiques registry in 1980. It is situated in what is now a small municipal garden, between a pavilion and the Lescudilier industrial zone (cadastre BE n°360).

== History ==
Salvage excavations have recovered rich materials from the site, including lapidary pieces, glass and metallic artifacts, coins, eight column capitals (four of which feature sculpted trachyte heads representing the Sun and Moon), a fluted column barrel fragment, and ceramics as well as terracotta antefixes.

These objects establish that the temple would have been in use from the 1st to 3rd centuries CE.

Some artifacts and architectural elements from the site are kept on display at the Aurillac Museum of Art and Archeology, along with a model reconstruction of the fanum.

== Architecture ==
The fanum is a circular chamber (cella) surrounded by a sixteen-sided polygonal ambulatory or gallery, which opens onto the Cère and Jordanne River valleys. The angles of the polygon are marked by the bases of fluted columns (eight of which are found in-place) bearing acanthus-leafed Corinthian capitals. Terracotta antefixes found at the site give some indication of the roofing materials and design. The complex appears to have had a courtyard encircled by a perimeter wall that was discovered through sondage, towards the northwest. The wall is 55 meters (180 ft) from the fanum, with a northwest-northeast orientation erected over a length of 84 meters (276 ft). There are also vestiges of a partially exposed square enclosure with paved ground southeast of the fanum, whose sides are 29 meters (95 ft) long. The structure is speculated to perhaps have been an annex of the sanctuary, a shelter for receiving pilgrims, or even another fanum.

Fanum d'Aron appears uncommon in Arverni and Vellavi territory for having a polygonal rather than quadrangular ambulatory, and unique for the ambulatory being of sixteen sides. Another fanum found at Mauriac (Cantal) can be compared for appearing to have had a round cella and decagonal ambulatory. This uncommon round cella with polygonal ambulatory plan seems to be more typical of Western Gaul than elsewhere, as it is also found in examples at Saint-Gervais (Vendée) and Chassenon (Charente).

== Related sites ==
A prospection of the Cantal département made by Alphonse Vinatié (1924–2005), a local archaeologist, made it possible to identify three other ancient sanctuaries in Landeyrat and Allanche, as well as possible sites in Celles, Charmensac, and Mauriac Vernols.

== See also ==
- Arverni
- Celtic polytheism
- Gallo-Roman culture
- Gauls

== Bibliography ==
- Calbris, Maxime (24 February 2020). "Changes in Places of Worship in the Ancient Urban Zone at Mathonière, in Allanche (Cantal): An Analysis of Pedestrian, Arial, and Geophysical Surveys". Siècles (En ligne). 48 (2020). OpenEdition Journals.
- Mitton, Claire (8 April 2008). "The Arverni and Vellavi's sanctuaries outside the capitals, from the 1st Century BC to the 4th Century AD: a typological and a spatial approach". Revue archéologique du Centre de la France. Tome 45-46 (2006–2007). OpenEdition Journals.
- Poursat, Jean-Claude (1979). "Circonscription d'Auvergne". Gallia. Tome 37 (fascicule 2): 472–474.

=== External links ===
- "Temple gallo-romain de type fanum". Ministère de la Culture.
- "Tête de Méduse / Archéologie". Musée d'Aurillac. musees.aurillac.fr.
