= Albepierre-Bredons =

Commune in Auvergne-Rhône-Alpes, France

- Commune
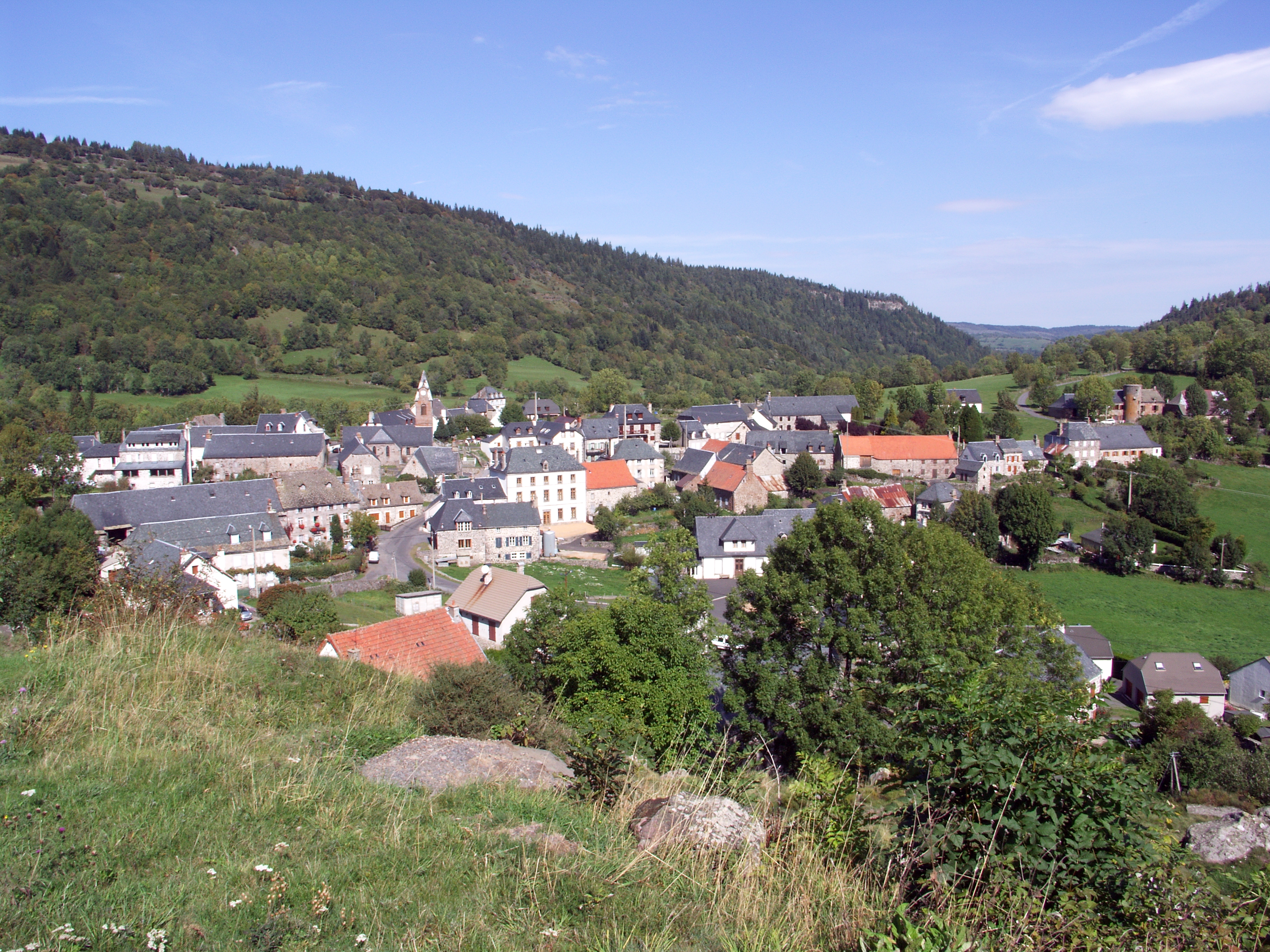
- A general view of Albepierre-Bredons

- Coat of arms
- Location of Albepierre-Bredons
- Location within France Location within Auvergne-Rhône-Alpes
- Coordinates: 45°04′41″N 2°49′58″E
- Country: France
- Region: Auvergne-Rhône-Alpes
- Department: Cantal
- Arrondissement: Saint-Flour
- Canton: Murat
- Intercommunality: Hautes Terres Communauté

Government
  - Mayor (2020–2026): Xavier Fournal
- Area^{1}: 34.42 km^{2} (13.29 sq mi)
- Elevation: 1,050 m (3,440 ft)
- Highest elevation: 1,855 m (6,086 ft)
- Lowest elevation: 872 m (2,861 ft)
- Population (2023): 242
  - Density: 7.03/km^{2} (18.2/sq mi)
- Time zone: UTC+01:00 (CET)
  - Summer (DST): UTC+02:00 (CEST)
- INSEE/Postal code: 15025 /15300
- ^{1} French Land Register data, which excludes lakes, ponds, glaciers > 1 km^{2} (0.386 sq mi or 247 acres) and river estuaries.

Albepierre-Bredons (French pronunciation: [albəpjɛʁ bʁədɔ̃]; Occitan: Alapèira e Bredòm) is a commune in the département of Cantal and Auvergne region of south-central France.

== Geography ==
Albepierre-Bredons is some 100 km south by south-west of Clermont-Ferrand and about 20 km north-west of Saint-Flour. It can be accessed by district road D39 coming south-west from Murat and continuing south-west by a circuitous route to Saint-Martin-sous-Vigouroux. District road D239 also starts from the town and heads north-east to join the D16 road north of Laveissenet.

== History ==
The commune of Bredons was established in the 1790s by the merger of the former communes of Bredon and Albepierre. In 1836 part of its territory was detached to form the new commune Laveissière. The commune of Bredons was renamed Albepierre-Bredons in 1955.

=== Heraldry ===
Arms of Albepierre-Bredons	Blazon: Or, a heart Gules, in chief Azure charged by a crescent Argent between two mullets of 5 points the same.

== Administration ==
List of Successive Mayors of Albepierre-Bredons

From	To	Name
2001	2014	Yvon Alain
2014	2020	Alain Vantalon
2020	2026	Xavier Fournal

== Population ==
The inhabitants of the commune are known as Arapiroux in French.

Historical population
Year	Pop.	±% p.a.
1968	366	—
1975	322	−1.81%
1982	281	−1.93%
1990	266	−0.68%
1999	237	−1.27%
2007	217	−1.10%
2012	221	+0.37%
2017	246	+2.17%
2023	242	−0.27%
Source: INSEE

== Culture and heritage ==
=== Civil heritage ===
- A Fountain at Bredons (Middle Ages)
- Château de Beccoire, a royal castle built by Saint Louis, now ruined. It served as a travelling headquarters of the Bailiwick of the Mountains.

=== Religious heritage ===
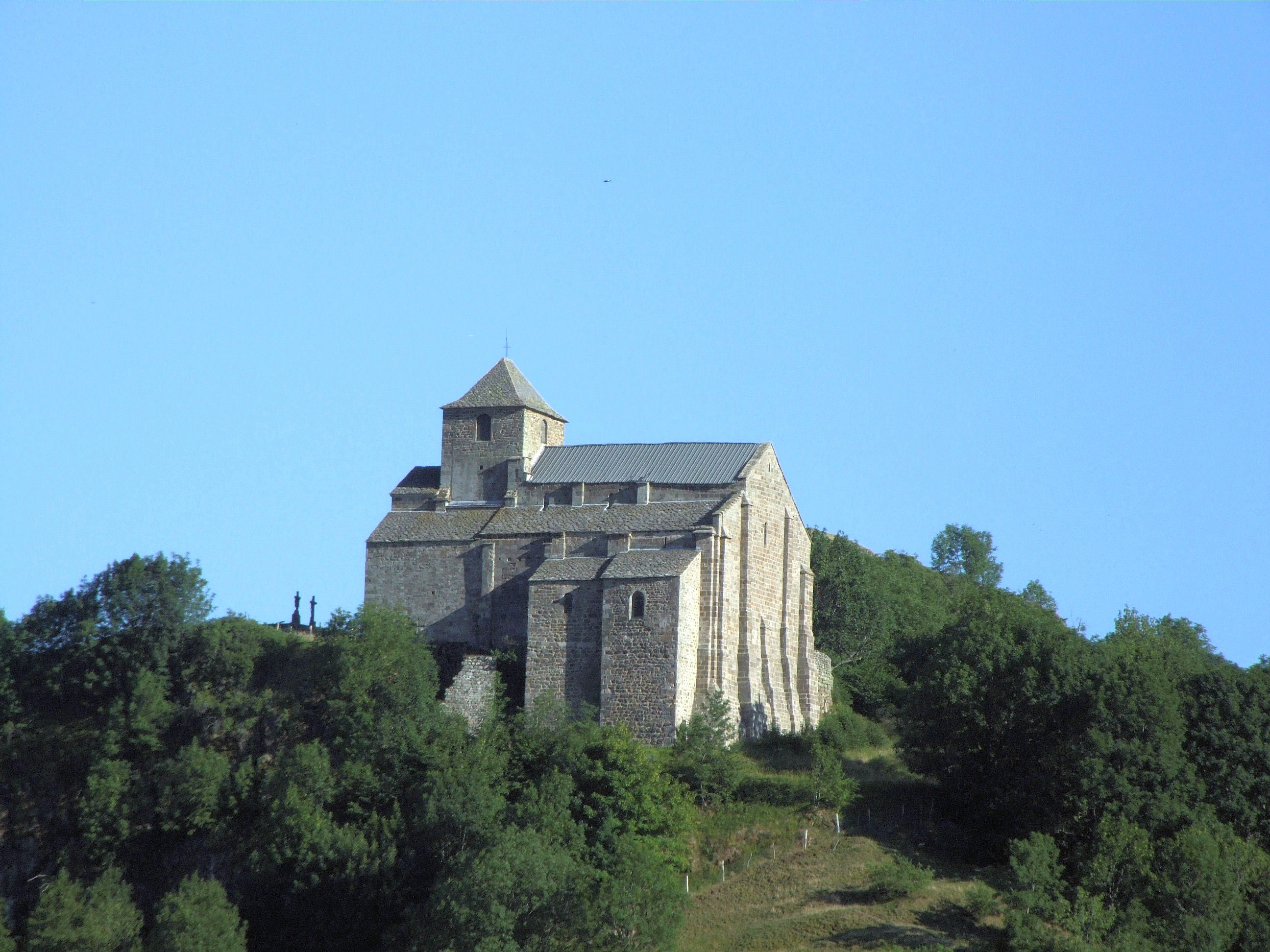
Church of Saint-Pierre of Bredons

The commune has two religious buildings and structures that are registered as historical monuments:

- A Calvary in the public square in Bredons (15th century)
- The Chapel of Bredons contains 6 Candlesticks (17th century) which are registered as historical objects.
- The Priory contains a Statue: Saint John (16th century) which is registered as an historical object.
- The Church of Albepierre contains several items that are registered as historical objects:
  - A Retable in the main Altar (18th century)
  - A Louis XV style Thurible (18th century)
  - A Reliquary Statue: Saint Timothy (17th century)
  - A Reliquary Statue: Saint Blaise (1699)
  - A Ciborium (18th century)
  - A Sunburst Monstrance (1890)
  - A Ciborium (18th century)
- The Church of Saint Pierre of Bredons (11th century) The Church of Saint Pierre contains a very large number of items that are registered as historical objects, including a Group Sculpture: Virgin in majesty (13th century)

== Notable people linked to the commune ==
- André-François Voulon, poet, storyteller, essayist, born in 1946 in Murat
- Alfred Jacomis, skier, champion of France in 1939, who also participated in the Olympics in Garmisch-Partenkirchen in Germany in 1936 and the World Championships in Chamonix in 1937
- Eugene Martens, historian of the Second World War
- Jean-Louis Philippart, physicist.
- Jean Ajalbert, writer, member of the Académie Goncourt. Born in 1863 in Levallois-Perret, died in 1947 in Cahors, buried at Bredons

== See also ==
- Communes of the Cantal department
