= Allanche =

Commune in Auvergne-Rhône-Alpes, France

- Commune
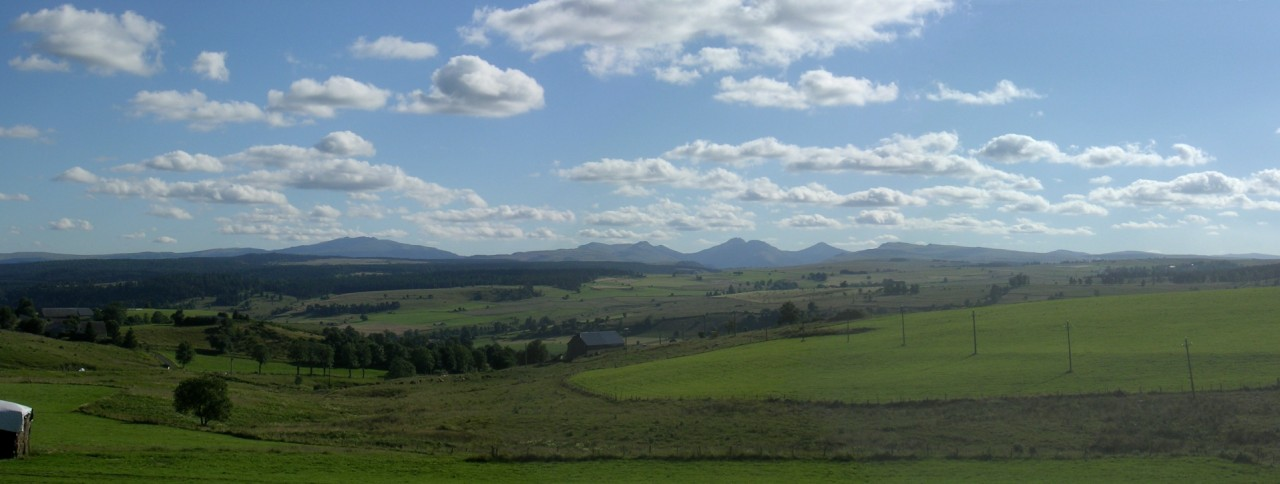
- View from Chavanon

- Coat of arms
- Location of Allanche
- Location within France Location within Auvergne-Rhône-Alpes
- Coordinates: 45°13′48″N 2°56′07″E
- Country: France
- Region: Auvergne-Rhône-Alpes
- Department: Cantal
- Arrondissement: Saint-Flour
- Canton: Murat
- Intercommunality: Hautes Terres Communauté

Government
  - Mayor (2020–2026): Philippe Rosseel
- Area^{1}: 49.89 km^{2} (19.26 sq mi)
- Elevation: 968 m (3,176 ft)
- Highest elevation: 1,295 m (4,249 ft)
- Lowest elevation: 784 m (2,572 ft)
- Population (2023): 773
  - Density: 15.5/km^{2} (40.1/sq mi)
- Time zone: UTC+01:00 (CET)
  - Summer (DST): UTC+02:00 (CEST)
- INSEE/Postal code: 15001 /15160
- ^{1} French Land Register data, which excludes lakes, ponds, glaciers > 1 km^{2} (0.386 sq mi or 247 acres) and river estuaries.

Allanche (French pronunciation: [alɑ̃ʃ]; Occitan: Alancha) is a commune in the Cantal department in the Auvergne region of south-central France.

== Geography ==
Allanche is located some 70 km south of Clermont-Ferrand and 20 km east by southeast of Massiac. It can be accessed by the D679 from Marcenat in the northwest to the village then south to Sainte-Anastasie. The D39 comes from Pradiers in the north through the village then south to Chalinargues. The D9 road branches off the D3 to the west of the commune and passes through the village continuing to the northeast. Apart from the village there are a number of hamlets. These are:

- Chastre
- Chavanon
- Coudour
- Feydit
- Le Bac Bas
- Le Bac Haut
- Les Cites
- Maillargues
- Roche Haut
- Romaniargues

The commune is largely farmland with patches of forest and the edge of a large forest in the east.

The Allanche river flows from the northwest through the village and continues southeast to feed the Alagnon river. Many tributaries feed the Allanche in the commune including the Ruisseau de Laneyrat, the Ruisseau de Coudoun, the Ruisseau de Chavanon, the Ruisseau de Vernois, and other unnamed streams.

=== Heraldry ===
Arms of Allanche	Blazon: Or, two keys saltirewise in sable.

== Administration ==
List of Successive Mayors

Mayors from the French Revolution to 1941

From	To	Name
1792	1800	Antoine Gabriel Benoid
1800	1802	Jean Pierre Feydin
1802	1805	Guillaume Peuvergne
1805	1813	Jean Pierre Feydin
1813	1830	Antoine Gabriel Benoid
1830	1838	Jean Benoit Bertrand
1838	1855	Jean Pierre Catinaud
1855	1874	Louis Bonnet
1874	1880	Gabriel Charles Bonnet
1880	1890	Jules Magot
1890	1896	Auguste Dellac
1896	1903	Henri Bonnet
1903	1904	Jean Romain Faucillon
1904	1919	Justin Veisset
1919	1929	Léon Parlier
1929	1932	Albert Chastel
1932	1935	Roger Albeine
1935	1941	Jules Eugène Farradeche

Mayors from 1941

From	To	Name	Party
1941	1944	Léon Parlier	
1944	1948	Jules Eugène Farradeche	
1948	1971	Maurice Peschaud	
1971	1995	Pierre Jarry	
1995	2001	Christian Léoty	RPR
2001	2008	André Papon	
2008	2016	Christian Léoty	LR
2016	2026	Philippe Rosseel	

== Population ==
The inhabitants of the commune are known as Allanchois or Allanchoises in French.

Historical population
Year	Pop.	±% p.a.
1968	1,513	—
1975	1,398	−1.12%
1982	1,286	−1.19%
1990	1,220	−0.66%
1999	1,101	−1.13%
2007	925	−2.15%
2012	820	−2.38%
2017	790	−0.74%
2023	773	−0.36%
Source: INSEE

== Culture and heritage ==
=== Civil heritage ===
- The former Château de Mercoeur (15th century) is registered as an historical monument.
- At Allanche station from May to September there is the Vélorail Cézallier for tourists.
- In the south-west of the commune are the Pinatelle Allanche mountains.

=== Religious heritage ===
The commune has two religious buildings and structures that are registered as historical monuments:

- The Church of Saint-Julien-de-Chanet (12th century). The church contains several items that are registered as historical objects:
  - The main Altar and Retable (17th century)
  - A Statue: Virgin and child (15th century)
  - A Group Sculpture: Virgin of Pity (16th century)
  - A Painting: the Adoration of the Magi (16th century)
  - Bas-reliefs (16th century)
- The Church of Saint John the Baptist (12th century). The church contains several items that are registered as historical objects:
  - A Sculpture: Ecce homo (15th century)
  - An Eagle Lectern (17th century)
  - A Bronze Bell (1671)
  - A set of Pews (16th century)
  - A Reliquary-Monstrance (15th century)
  - A Processional Cross (15th century)

Other religious sites of interest

- The Presbytery contains a Reliquary (15th century) that is registered as an historical object.
- The Church of Chanet contains a Processional Cross (15th century) which is registered as an historical object.

=== Church of Saint John the Baptist Picture Gallery ===
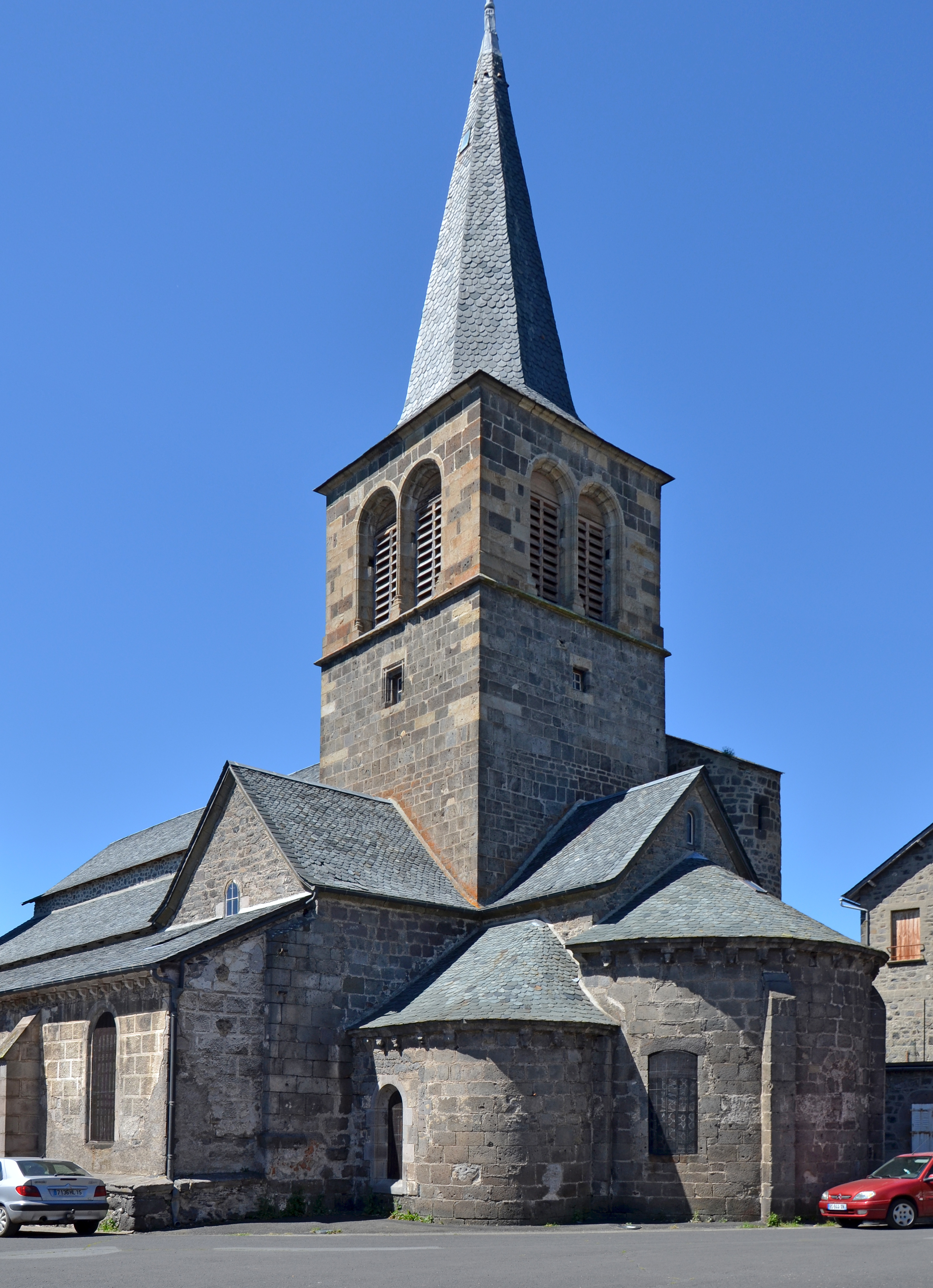
The church

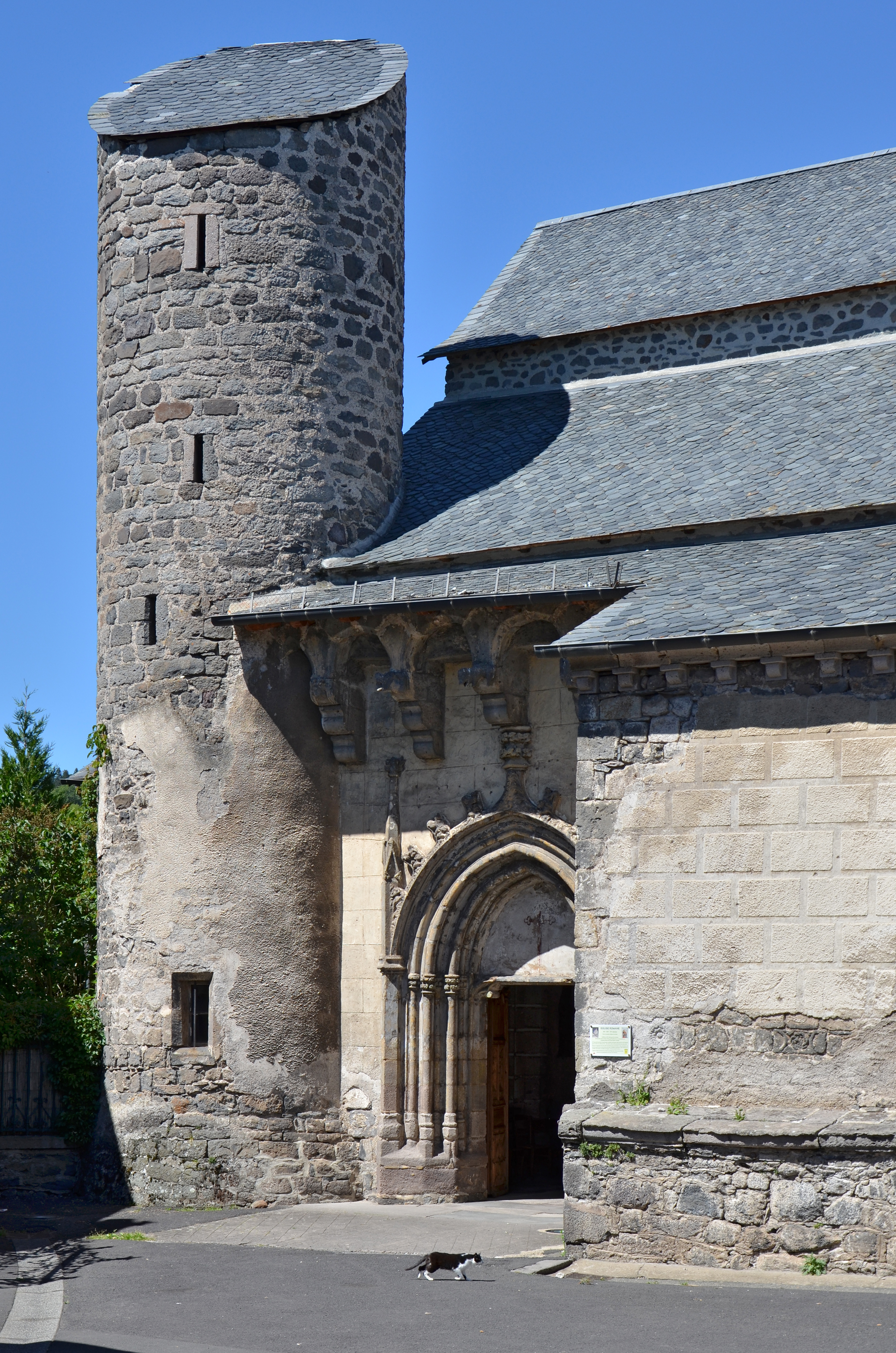
Entrance and Tower

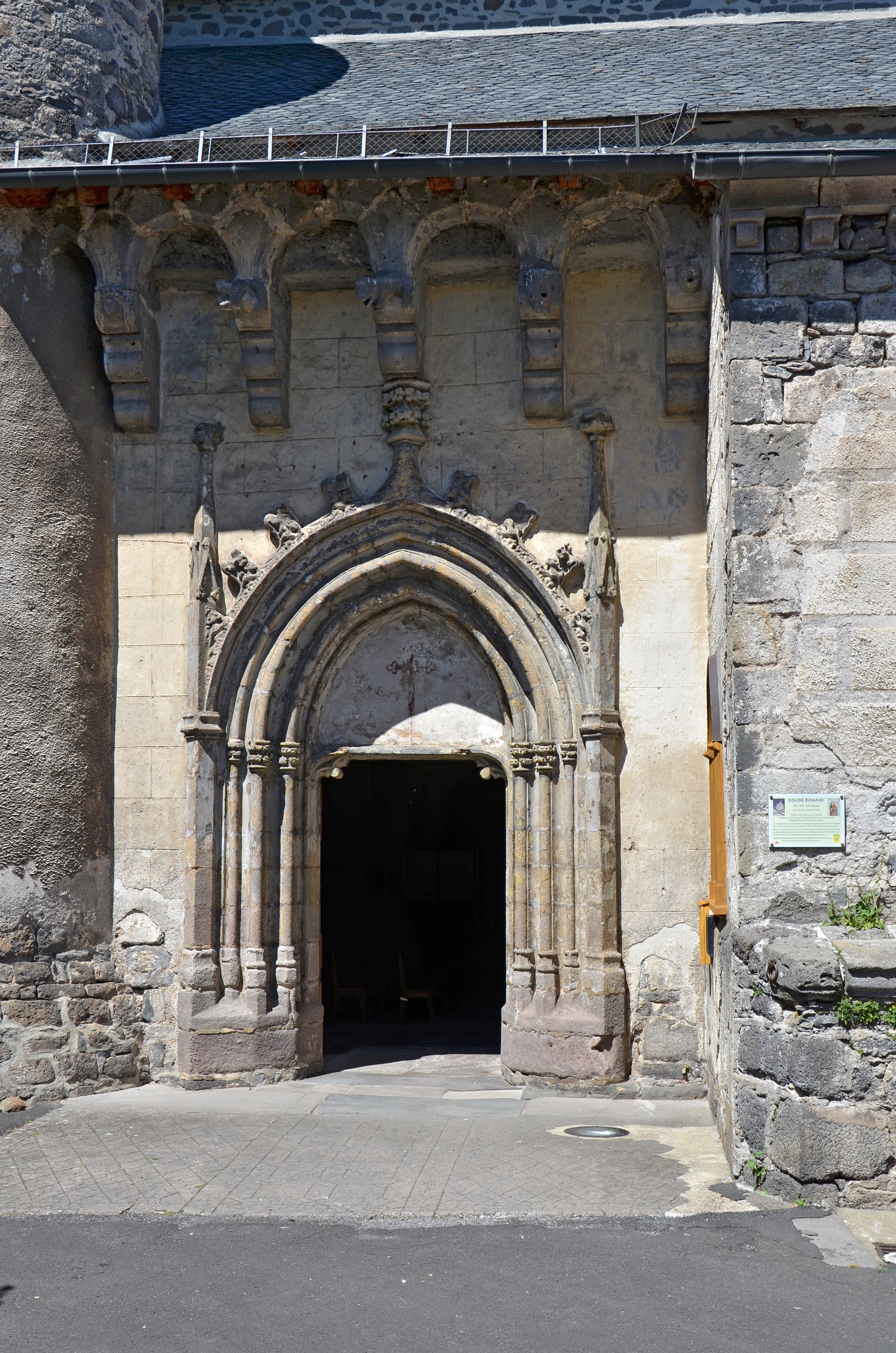
The entrance

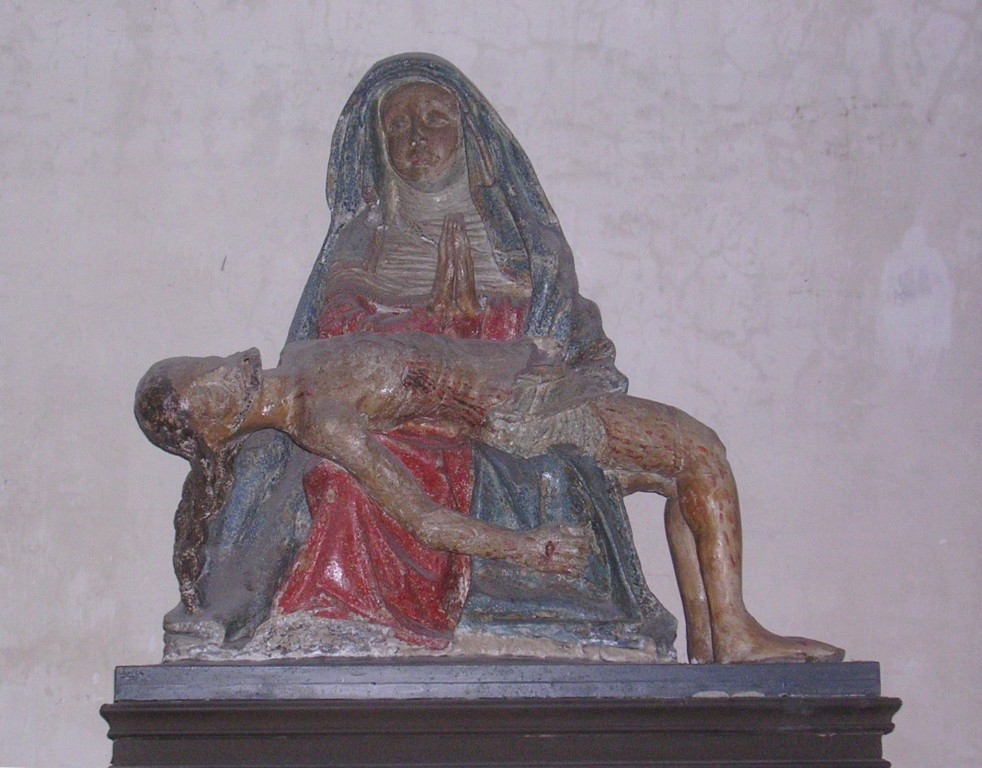
The pieta in the church

== Notable people linked to the commune ==
- Charles Ganilh (1758–1836), economist, was born in Allanche.

== See also ==
- Communes of the Cantal department
- Cantons of the Cantal department
- Arrondissements of the Cantal department

=== Bibliography ===
- Our Auvergne ancestors, the Auvergne migration to Brittany, Serge Duigou, Éditions Ressac, Quimper, 2004. [On the Cézallier migratory movement to Brittany in the 18th and 19th centuries which included Allanche together with Albaret, Chabrier, Laymet, Mainhes, etc..] (in French)
