= Lavigerie =

Lavigerie may refer to:

- Charles Lavigerie, a French cardinal, archbishop of Carthage and Algiers and primate of Africa
- Lavigerie, a commune of the Cantal département, in France
