= Chavagnac =

Chavagnac may refer to the following:

== People ==
- Henri-Louis de Chavagnac (166 –1743) was a French naval officer
- Michel-Joseph Gentil de Chavagnac (1770–1846), French chansonnier and playwright

== Places in France ==
- Chavagnac, Cantal, a commune of the Cantal département
- Chavagnac, Dordogne, a commune of the Dordogne département
