= Puy Griou =

Mountain in central France

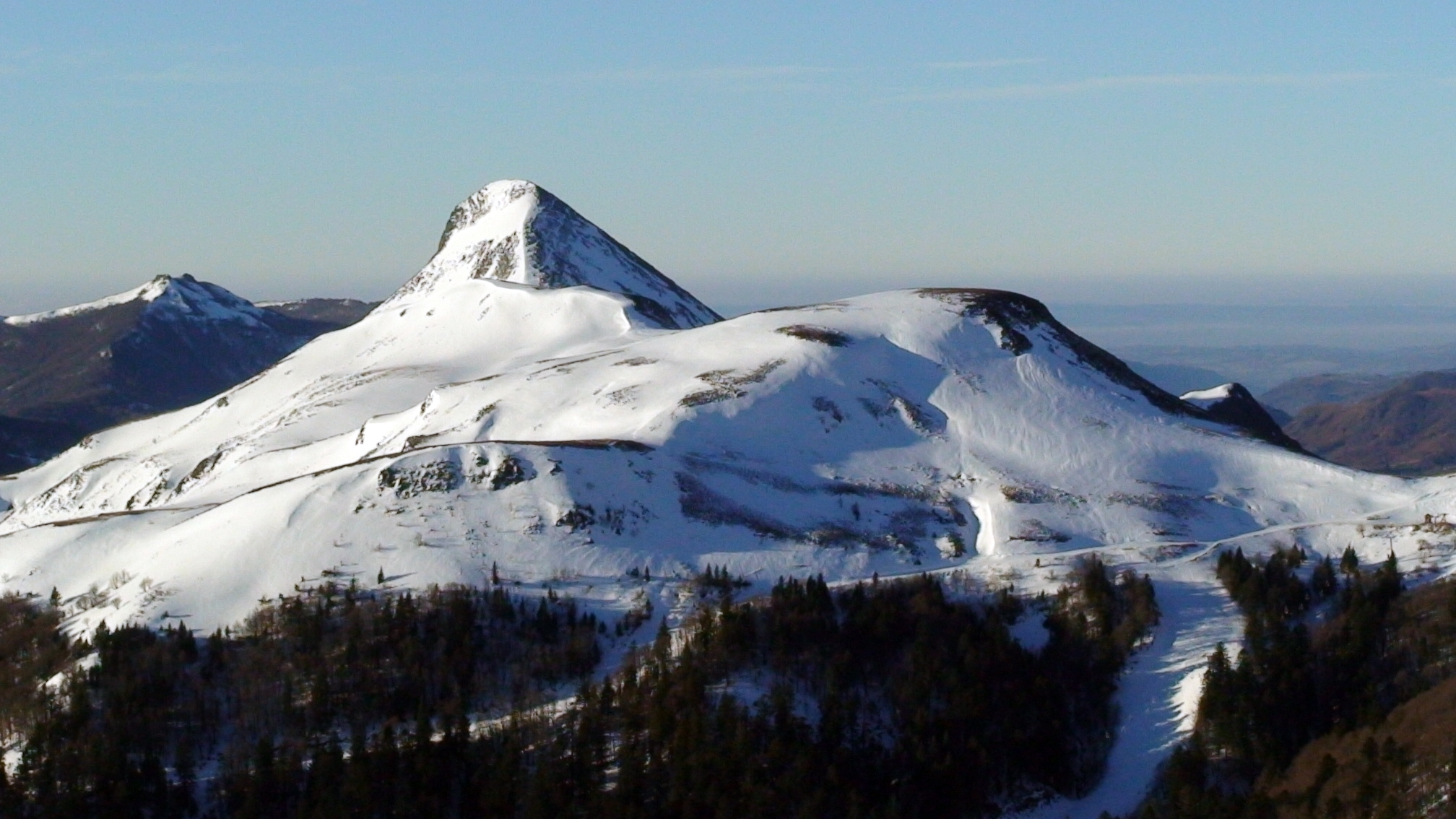

Highest point
- Elevation: 1,690 m (5,540 ft)
- Coordinates: 45°04′49″N 2°42′22″E

Geography
- Location within France
- Location: Cantal departement, France
- Parent range: Mounts of Cantal (Massif Central)

The Puy Griou is a summit at an altitude of 1,690 meters in the Mounts of Cantal, located on the ridge line between the valleys of the Cère and the Jordanne, partially situated in the municipalities of Saint-Jacques-des-Blats and Mandailles.

== Toponymy ==
The summit is called "Puei Griu" in Aurillac Occitan. In this dialect, griu comes from griea, which means "difficult to climb." In the Occitan auvergnat spoken further north of the mountain, it is called Puei de Grion.

== Geology ==
Due to its position in the center of the Monts du Cantal and its very slender conical shape, Puy Griou was long considered to be the eroded chimney of the Cantal volcano. However, it has since lost this status, and geologists now consider it to be a phonolite dome occupying a central position similar to other peaks in the massif such as Roc d'Hozières. It is believed to have formed approximately 6 million years ago, following the paroxysmal eruptive phases experienced by the Cantal between 8.5 Ma and 6.5 Ma. During the cold periods of the recent Quaternary, repeated freeze-thaw cycles fractured the rock into slabs, forming a scree mantle.

== Access ==
The GR 400 follows the ridge line between the Col du Pertus and the Col de Rombière, near the ski resort of Le Lioran. At the foot of the dome, a trail veers southward, allowing for the ascent of the final 200 meters of elevation gain.
