= Sainte-Anastasie =

Sainte-Anastasie is the name or part of the name of several communes in France:

- Sainte-Anastasie, in the Cantal department
- Sainte-Anastasie, in the Gard department
- Sainte-Anastasie-sur-Issole, in the Var department
