= Chastel-sur-Murat =

- Part of Murat
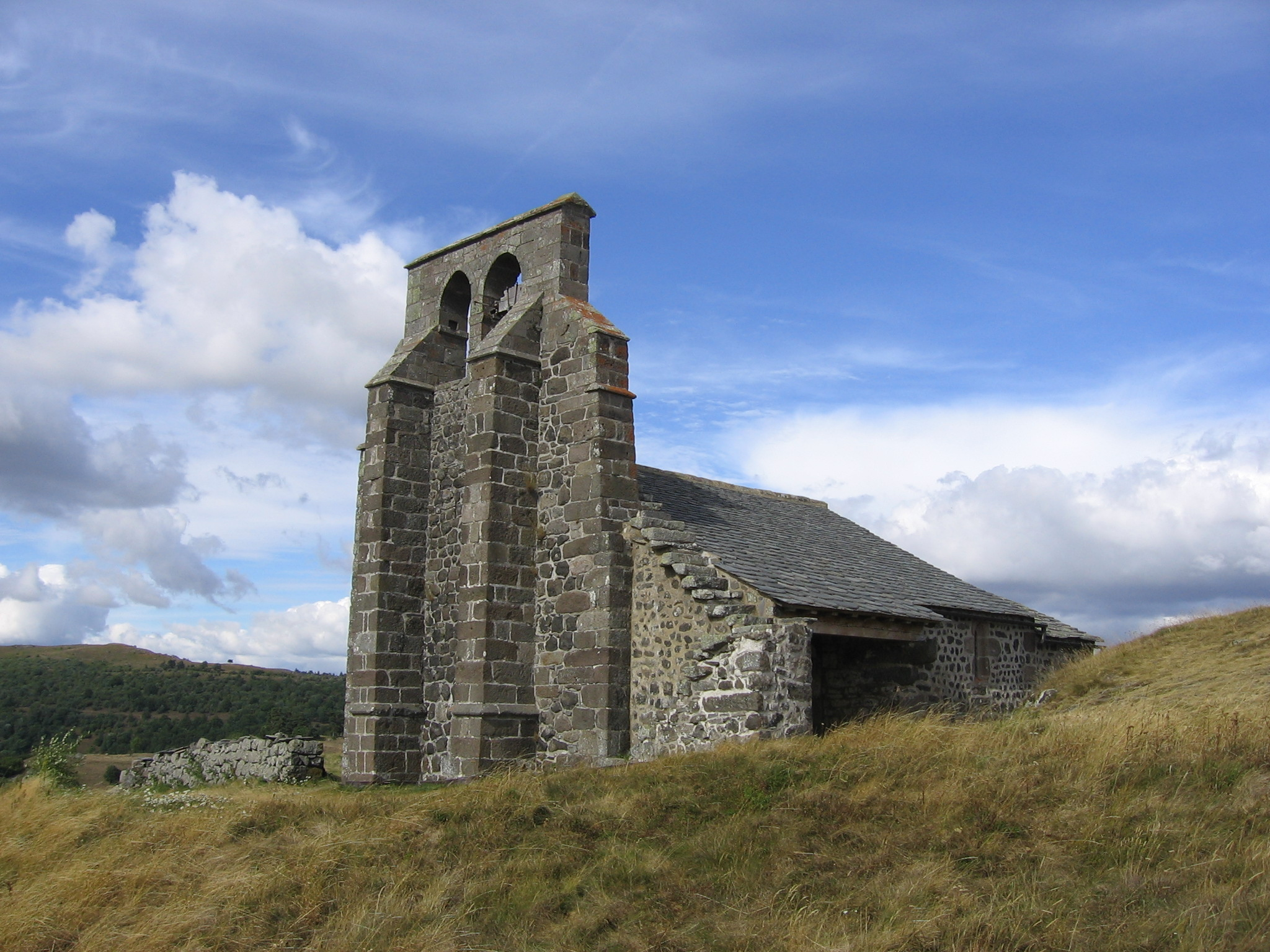
- The Chapel of Saint-Antoine, in Chastel-sur-Murat
- Location of Chastel-sur-Murat
- Location within France Location within Auvergne-Rhône-Alpes
- Coordinates: 45°07′30″N 2°51′29″E
- Country: France
- Region: Auvergne-Rhône-Alpes
- Department: Cantal
- Arrondissement: Saint-Flour
- Canton: Murat
- Commune: Murat
- Area^{1}: 13.79 km^{2} (5.32 sq mi)
- Elevation: 1,100 m (3,600 ft)
- Highest elevation: 1,360 m (4,460 ft)
- Lowest elevation: 1,000 m (3,300 ft)
- Population (2023): 115
  - Density: 8.34/km^{2} (21.6/sq mi)
- Time zone: UTC+01:00 (CET)
  - Summer (DST): UTC+02:00 (CEST)
- Postal code: 15300
- ^{1} French Land Register data, which excludes lakes, ponds, glaciers > 1 km^{2} (0.386 sq mi or 247 acres) and river estuaries.

Chastel-sur-Murat (French pronunciation: [ʃastɛl syʁ myʁa], literally Chastel on Murat; Auvergnat: Chastèl sobre Murat) is a former commune in the Cantal department in south-central France. On 1 January 2017, it was merged into the commune Murat.

== See also ==
- Communes of the Cantal department
