= Saint-Jean-Baptiste, Virargues =

Church located in Cantal, in France

Coordinates: 45°7′27″N 2°54′41″E

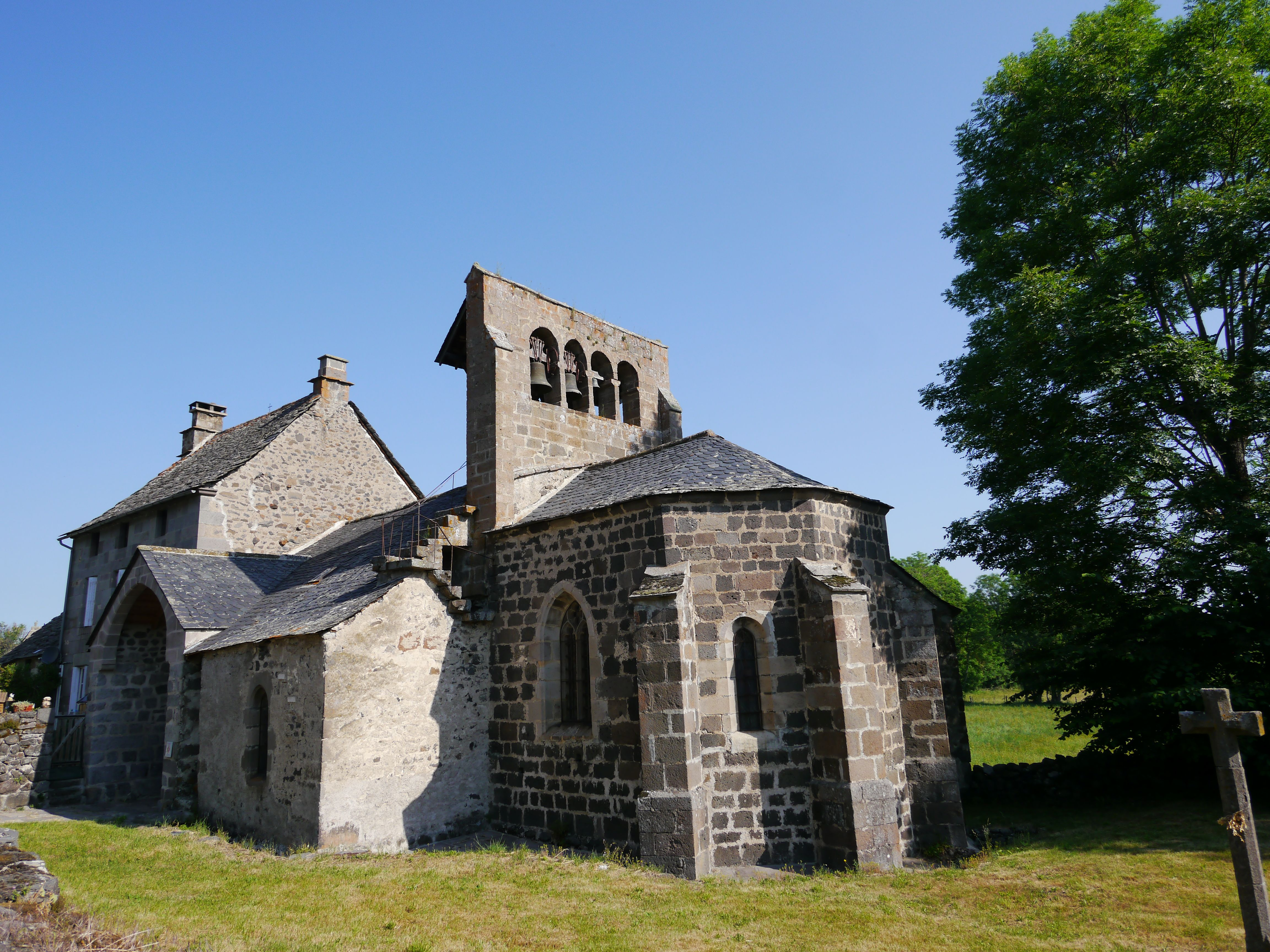
Church of Saint-Jean-Baptiste de Virargues

L'église Saint-Jean-Baptiste is a church in Virargues in the Cantal département in the Auvergne-Rhône-Alpes region of France. It was built in the 12th century, and modified in the 15th, 16th and 17th centuries.

== See also ==
Sainte-Reine Church

== Note ==
- Summed up and translated from the equivalent article at French Wikipédia, 29 May 2008
