= Celles, Cantal =

Celles
- Commune
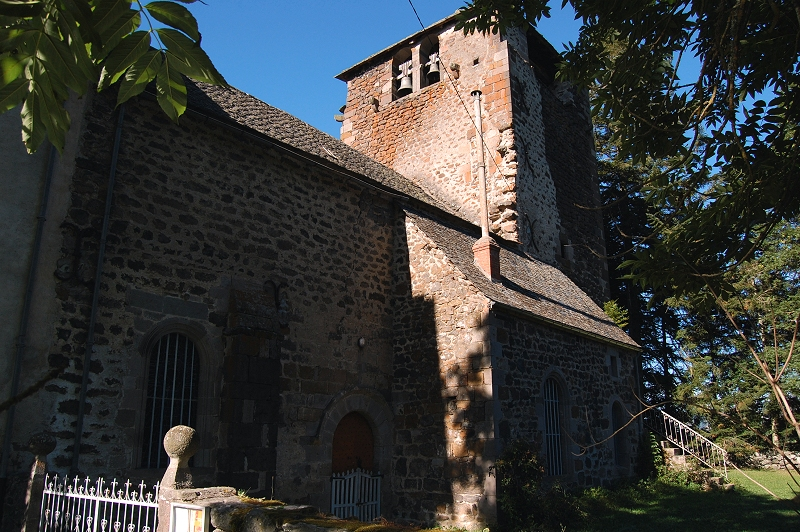
- The templar preceptory of Celles
- Location of Celles
- Location within France Location within Auvergne-Rhône-Alpes
- Coordinates: 45°06′57″N 2°57′17″E
- Country: France
- Region: Auvergne-Rhône-Alpes
- Department: Cantal
- Arrondissement: Saint-Flour
- Canton: Murat
- Area^{1}: 18.35 km^{2} (7.08 sq mi)
- Elevation: 880 m (2,890 ft)
- Highest elevation: 1,075 m (3,527 ft)
- Lowest elevation: 800 m (2,600 ft)
- Population (2023): 217
  - Density: 11.8/km^{2} (30.6/sq mi)
- Time zone: UTC+01:00 (CET)
  - Summer (DST): UTC+02:00 (CEST)
- INSEE/Postal code: 15031 /15170
- ^{1} French Land Register data, which excludes lakes, ponds, glaciers > 1 km^{2} (0.386 sq mi or 247 acres) and river estuaries.

Celles (French pronunciation: [sɛl]; Auvergnat: Cèlas) is a commune in the Cantal department in south-central France. Between December 2016 and January 2025, it was part of Neussargues en Pinatelle.

== Population ==
Historical population
Year	Pop.	±% p.a.
1968	281	—
1975	257	−1.27%
1982	229	−1.63%
1990	221	−0.44%
1999	239	+0.87%
2007	235	−0.21%
2012	224	−0.95%
2017	213	−1.00%
2023	217	+0.31%
Source: INSEE

== See also ==
- Communes of the Cantal department
