= Vernols =

Commune in Auvergne-Rhône-Alpes, France

- Commune
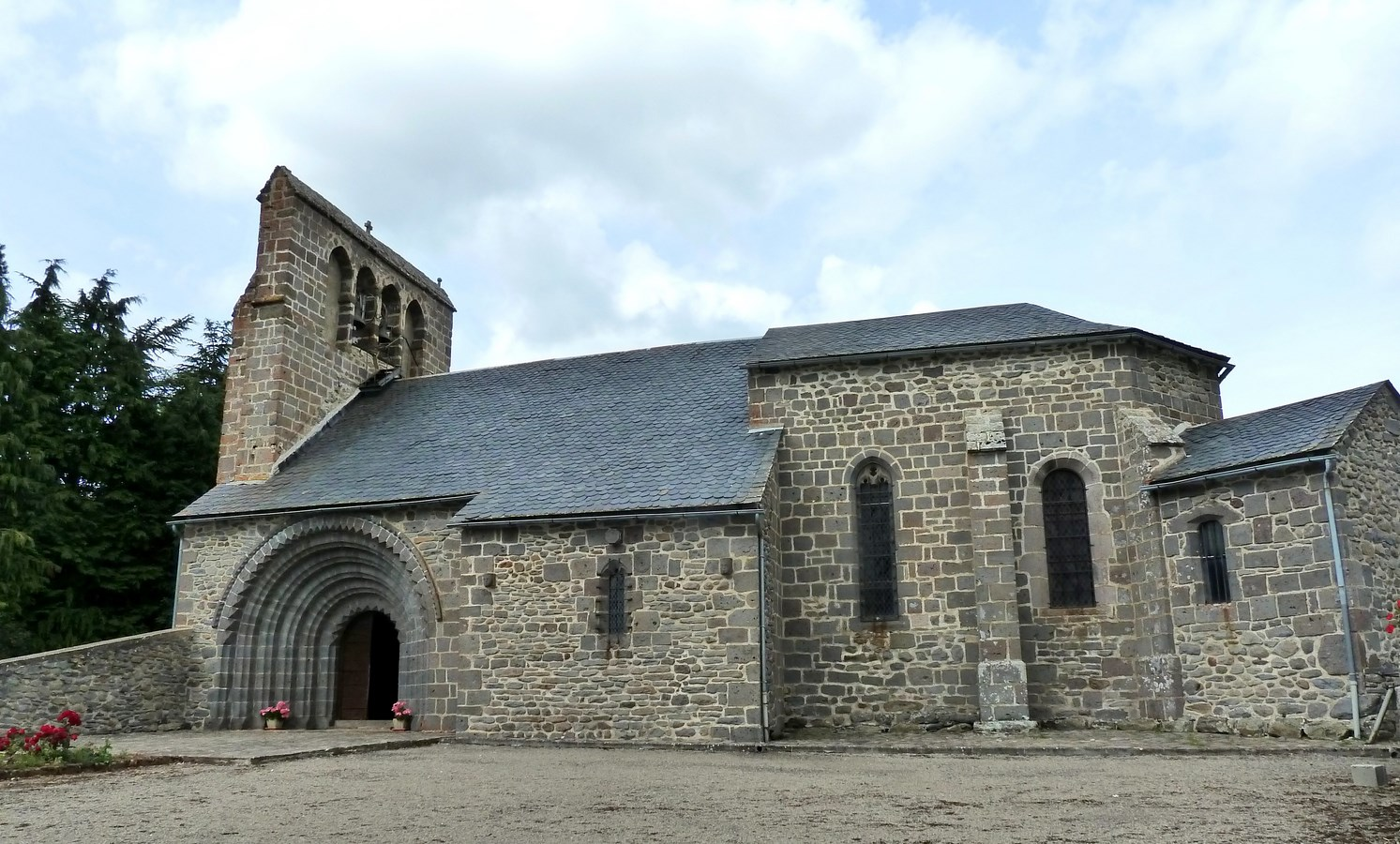
- The church in Vernols
- Location of Vernols
- Location within France Location within Auvergne-Rhône-Alpes
- Coordinates: 45°13′37″N 2°53′28″E
- Country: France
- Region: Auvergne-Rhône-Alpes
- Department: Cantal
- Arrondissement: Saint-Flour
- Canton: Murat
- Intercommunality: Hautes Terres

Government
  - Mayor (2020–2026): David Geneix
- Area^{1}: 24.2 km^{2} (9.3 sq mi)
- Elevation: 1,100 m (3,600 ft)
- Highest elevation: 1,226 m (4,022 ft)
- Lowest elevation: 988 m (3,241 ft)
- Population (2023): 56
  - Density: 2.3/km^{2} (6.0/sq mi)
- Time zone: UTC+01:00 (CET)
  - Summer (DST): UTC+02:00 (CEST)
- INSEE/Postal code: 15253 /15160
- ^{1} French Land Register data, which excludes lakes, ponds, glaciers > 1 km^{2} (0.386 sq mi or 247 acres) and river estuaries.

Vernols (French pronunciation: [vɛʁnɔl]; Occitan: Vernòls) is a commune in the Cantal department in south-central France.

== Population ==
Historical population
Year	Pop.	±% p.a.
1968	145	—
1975	112	−3.62%
1982	107	−0.65%
1990	93	−1.74%
1999	81	−1.52%
2007	71	−1.63%
2012	67	−1.15%
2017	65	−0.60%
2023	56	−2.45%
Source: INSEE

== See also ==
- Communes of the Cantal department
