= Dienne =

Commune in Auvergne-Rhône-Alpes, France

- Commune
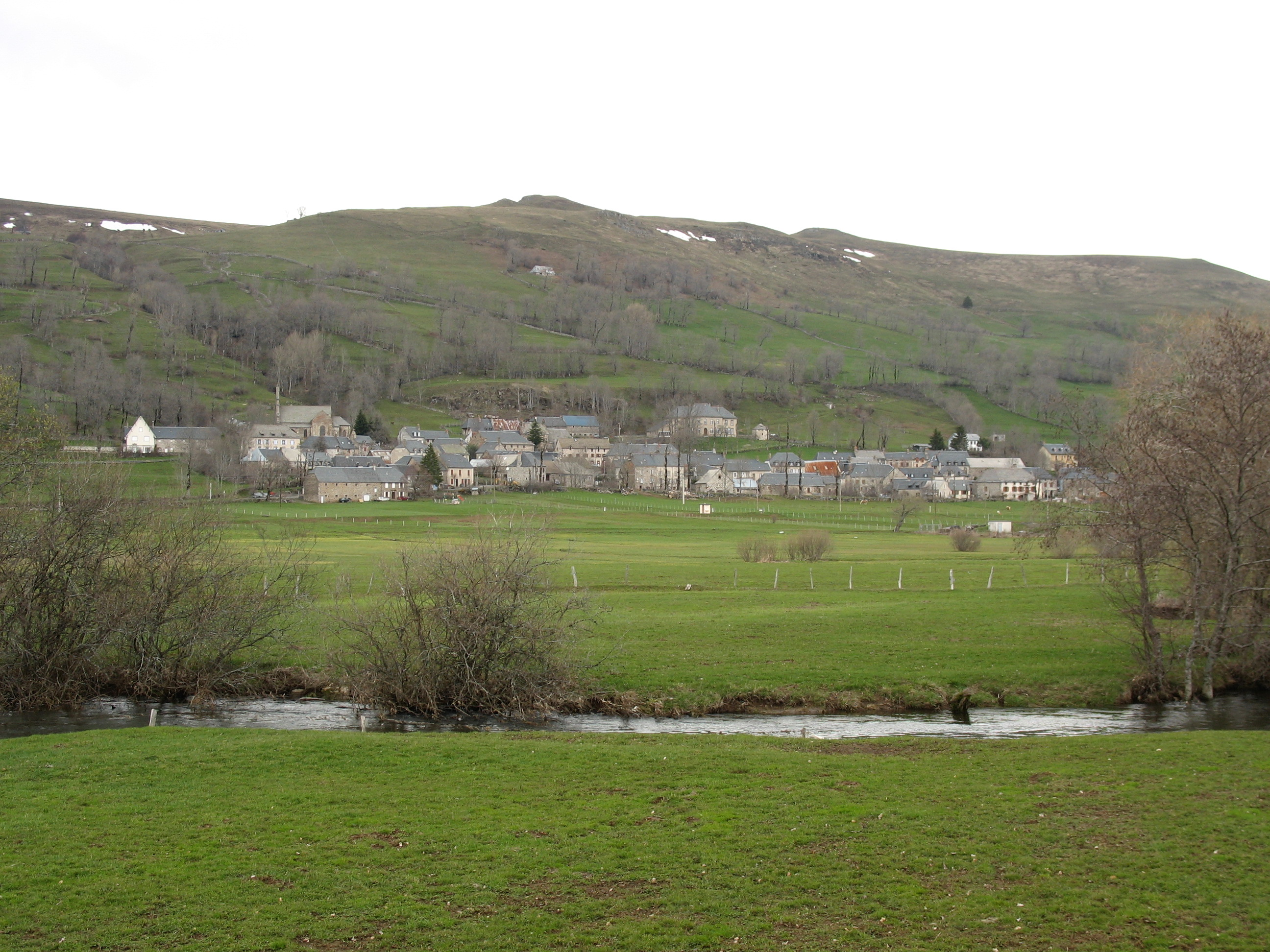
- A general view of Dienne

- Coat of arms
- Location of Dienne
- Location within France Location within Auvergne-Rhône-Alpes
- Coordinates: 45°09′34″N 2°47′16″E
- Country: France
- Region: Auvergne-Rhône-Alpes
- Department: Cantal
- Arrondissement: Saint-Flour
- Canton: Murat
- Intercommunality: Hautes Terres

Government
  - Mayor (2020–2026): Thierry Mathieu
- Area^{1}: 46.33 km^{2} (17.89 sq mi)
- Elevation: 1,050 m (3,440 ft)
- Highest elevation: 1,561 m (5,121 ft)
- Lowest elevation: 1,015 m (3,330 ft)
- Population (2023): 235
  - Density: 5.07/km^{2} (13.1/sq mi)
- Demonym: Dianaire (French)
- Time zone: UTC+01:00 (CET)
  - Summer (DST): UTC+02:00 (CEST)
- INSEE/Postal code: 15061 /15300
- ^{1} French Land Register data, which excludes lakes, ponds, glaciers > 1 km^{2} (0.386 sq mi or 247 acres) and river estuaries.

Dienne (French pronunciation: [djɛn]; Occitan: Dièna or Diana) is a commune in the department of Cantal, and the administrative region of Auvergne-Rhône-Alpes, southcentral France.

== Population ==
Historical population
Year	Pop.	±% p.a.
1968	583	—
1975	496	−2.28%
1982	396	−3.17%
1990	359	−1.22%
1999	293	−2.23%
2007	258	−1.58%
2012	263	+0.38%
2017	273	+0.75%
2023	235	−2.47%
Source: INSEE

== See also ==
- Communes of the Cantal department
