= Joursac =

Commune in Auvergne-Rhône-Alpes, France

- Commune
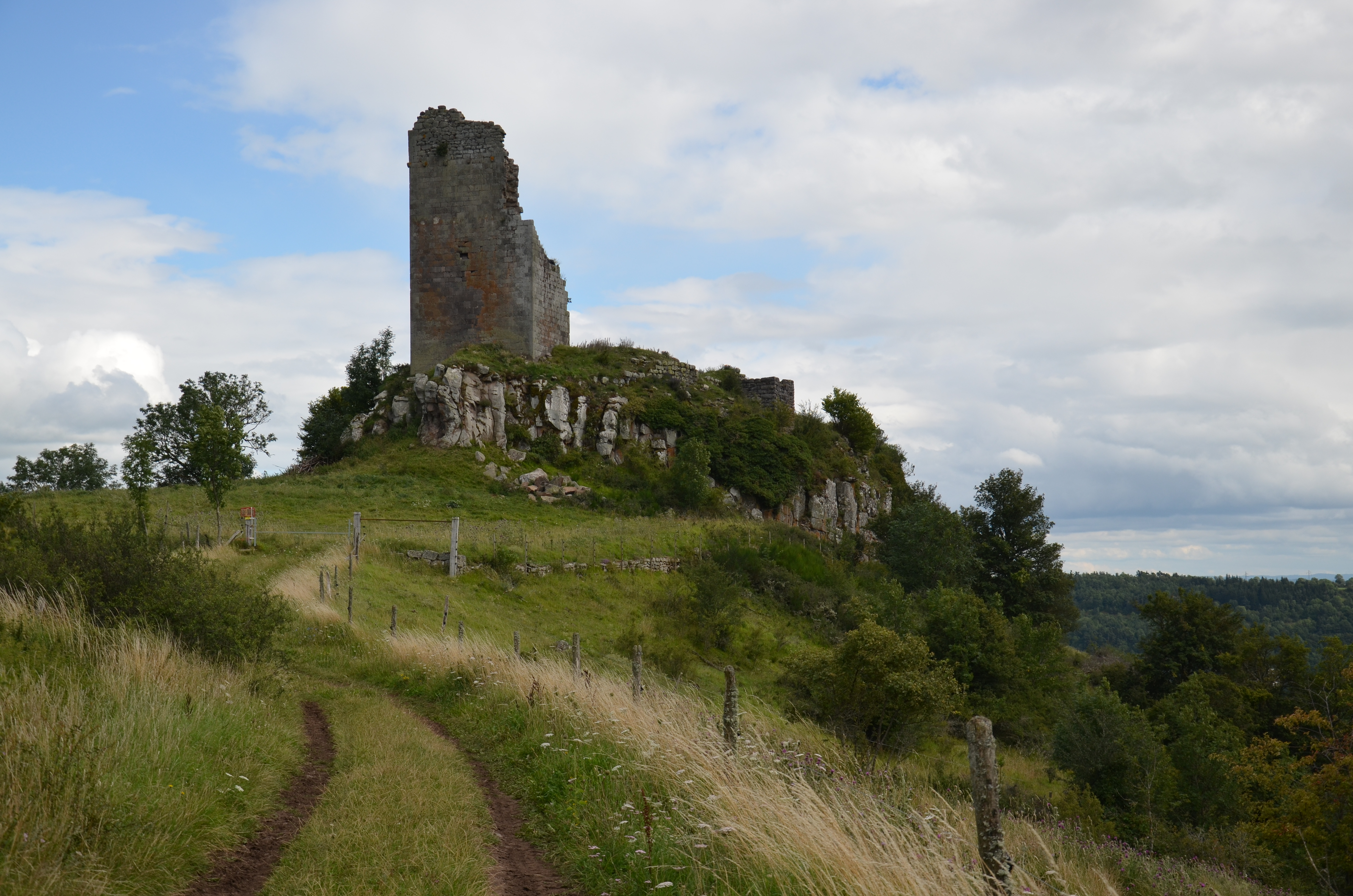
- The Château of Mardogne, in Joursac
- Location of Joursac
- Location within France Location within Auvergne-Rhône-Alpes
- Coordinates: 45°08′34″N 3°00′22″E
- Country: France
- Region: Auvergne-Rhône-Alpes
- Department: Cantal
- Arrondissement: Saint-Flour
- Canton: Murat

Government
  - Mayor (2020–2026): Jean Rongier
- Area^{1}: 21.11 km^{2} (8.15 sq mi)
- Elevation: 625 m (2,051 ft)
- Highest elevation: 1,166 m (3,825 ft)
- Lowest elevation: 681 m (2,234 ft)
- Population (2023): 160
  - Density: 7.6/km^{2} (20/sq mi)
- Time zone: UTC+01:00 (CET)
  - Summer (DST): UTC+02:00 (CEST)
- INSEE/Postal code: 15080 /15170
- ^{1} French Land Register data, which excludes lakes, ponds, glaciers > 1 km^{2} (0.386 sq mi or 247 acres) and river estuaries.

Joursac (French pronunciation: [ʒuʁsak]; Occitan: Jorçac) is a commune in the Cantal department in south-central France.

== Population ==
Historical population
Year	Pop.	±% p.a.
1968	302	—
1975	261	−2.06%
1982	202	−3.59%
1990	193	−0.57%
1999	155	−2.41%
2007	155	+0.00%
2012	148	−0.92%
2017	146	−0.27%
2023	160	+1.54%
Source: INSEE

== See also ==
- Communes of the Cantal department
