= Sainte-Reine, Virargues =

Chapel near Virargues, France

Coordinates: 45°7′21″N 2°53′8″E

The Church of Sainte-Reine in the Diocese of Saint-Flour is a pilgrimage center and miraculous shrine near Virargues, in the Cantal department of France.

== See also ==
Église Saint-Jean-Baptiste

== Notes and references ==
- Summed up and translated from the equivalent article at French Wikipédia, 29 May 2008
