= Chalinargues =

- Commune
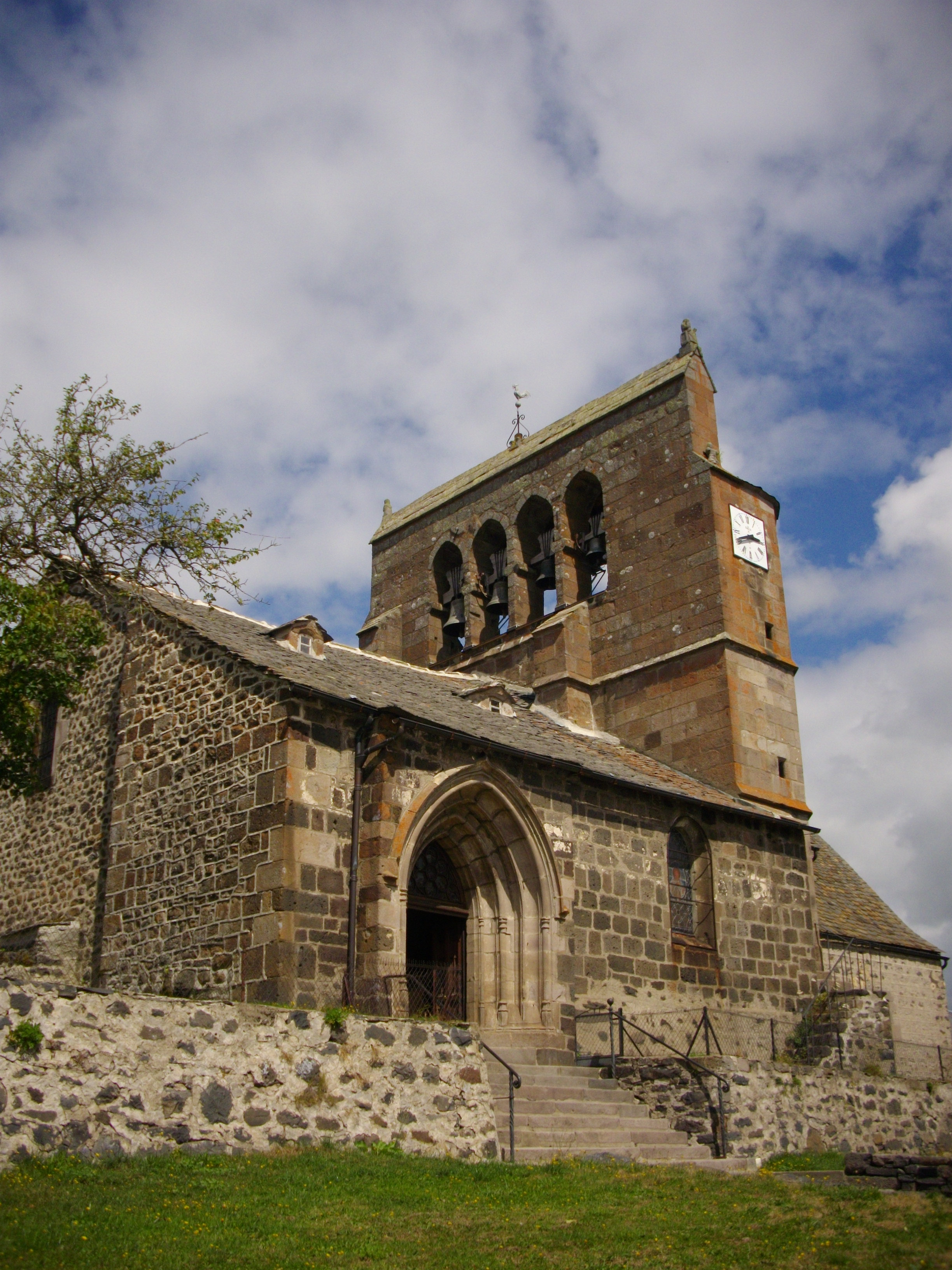
- The church in Chalinargues
- Location of Chalinargues
- Location within France Location within Auvergne-Rhône-Alpes
- Coordinates: 45°09′21″N 2°55′59″E
- Country: France
- Region: Auvergne-Rhône-Alpes
- Department: Cantal
- Arrondissement: Saint-Flour
- Canton: Murat
- Area^{1}: 27.55 km^{2} (10.64 sq mi)
- Elevation: 1,060 m (3,480 ft)
- Highest elevation: 1,169 m (3,835 ft)
- Lowest elevation: 909 m (2,982 ft)
- Population (2023): 304
  - Density: 11.0/km^{2} (28.6/sq mi)
- Time zone: UTC+01:00 (CET)
  - Summer (DST): UTC+02:00 (CEST)
- INSEE/Postal code: 15035 /15170
- ^{1} French Land Register data, which excludes lakes, ponds, glaciers > 1 km^{2} (0.386 sq mi or 247 acres) and river estuaries.

Chalinargues (French pronunciation: [ʃalinaʁɡ]; Auvergnat: Chinargues) is a commune in the Cantal department in south-central France. Between December 2016 and January 2025, it was part of Neussargues en Pinatelle.

== Population ==
Historical population
Year	Pop.	±% p.a.
1968	635	—
1975	527	−2.63%
1982	440	−2.54%
1990	442	+0.06%
1999	433	−0.23%
2007	435	+0.06%
2012	426	−0.42%
2017	401	−1.20%
2023	304	−4.51%
Source: INSEE

== See also ==
- Communes of the Cantal department
