= Saint-Saturnin, Cantal =

Commune in Auvergne-Rhône-Alpes, France

Saint-Saturnin
- Commune
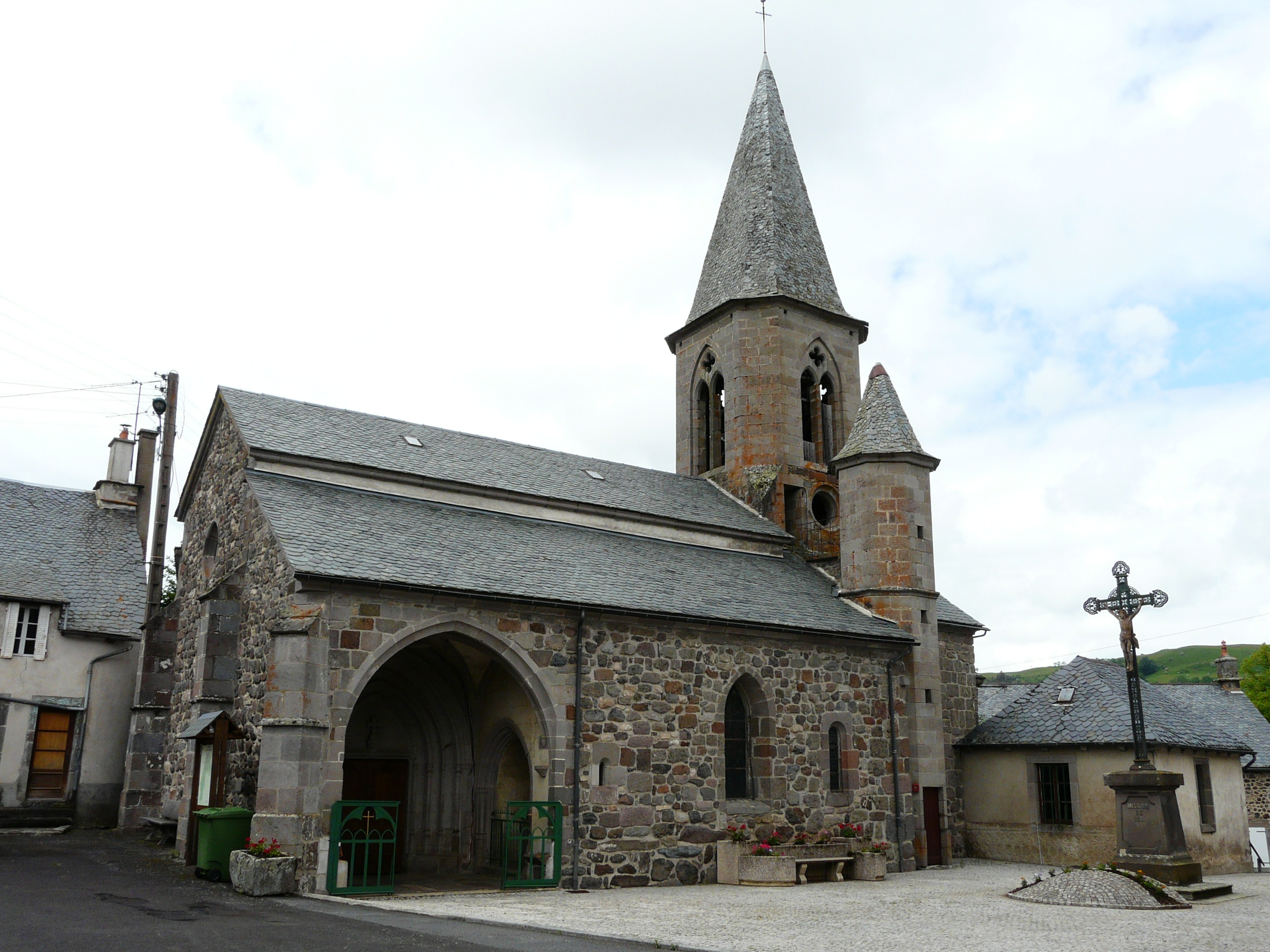
- The church in Saint-Saturnin
- Location of Saint-Saturnin
- Location within France Location within Auvergne-Rhône-Alpes
- Coordinates: 45°15′21″N 2°47′45″E
- Country: France
- Region: Auvergne-Rhône-Alpes
- Department: Cantal
- Arrondissement: Saint-Flour
- Canton: Murat

Government
  - Mayor (2020–2026): Claire Andrieux
- Area^{1}: 38.71 km^{2} (14.95 sq mi)
- Elevation: 933 m (3,061 ft)
- Highest elevation: 1,380 m (4,530 ft)
- Lowest elevation: 911 m (2,989 ft)
- Population (2023): 186
  - Density: 4.80/km^{2} (12.4/sq mi)
- Time zone: UTC+01:00 (CET)
  - Summer (DST): UTC+02:00 (CEST)
- INSEE/Postal code: 15213 /15190
- ^{1} French Land Register data, which excludes lakes, ponds, glaciers > 1 km^{2} (0.386 sq mi or 247 acres) and river estuaries.

Saint-Saturnin (French pronunciation: [sɛ̃ satyʁnɛ̃]; Auvergnat: Sant Saturnin) is a commune in the Cantal department in south-central France. Its 12th century church is a listed monument.

== Population ==
Historical population
Year	Pop.	±% p.a.
1968	621	—
1975	557	−1.54%
1982	427	−3.73%
1990	320	−3.54%
1999	248	−2.79%
2007	226	−1.15%
2012	210	−1.46%
2017	205	−0.48%
2023	186	−1.61%
Source: INSEE

== See also ==
- Communes of the Cantal department
