= Virargues =

Commune in Auvergne-Rhône-Alpes, France

- Commune
- Location of Virargues
- Location within France Location within Auvergne-Rhône-Alpes
- Coordinates: 45°07′33″N 2°54′40″E
- Country: France
- Region: Auvergne-Rhône-Alpes
- Department: Cantal
- Arrondissement: Saint-Flour
- Canton: Murat

Government
  - Mayor (2020–2026): Michel Marsal
- Area^{1}: 11.03 km^{2} (4.26 sq mi)
- Highest elevation: 1,225 m (4,019 ft)
- Lowest elevation: 854 m (2,802 ft)
- Population (2023): 116
  - Density: 10.5/km^{2} (27.2/sq mi)
- Time zone: UTC+01:00 (CET)
  - Summer (DST): UTC+02:00 (CEST)
- INSEE/Postal code: 15263 /15300
- ^{1} French Land Register data, which excludes lakes, ponds, glaciers > 1 km^{2} (0.386 sq mi or 247 acres) and river estuaries.

Virargues (French pronunciation: [viʁaʁɡ]) is a commune in the Cantal department in the Auvergne Region in south-central France.

== Population ==
Historical population
Year	Pop.	±% p.a.
1968	191	—
1975	189	−0.15%
1982	155	−2.79%
1990	158	+0.24%
1999	140	−1.33%
2007	135	−0.45%
2012	135	+0.00%
2017	133	−0.30%
2023	116	−2.25%
Source: INSEE

== Government ==
This is a list of mayors of Virargues.

Name	Start	End	Notes
Michel Marsal	December 2002	2014	
Champagnac			
Maurice Capelle			Former Conseiller général
Pierre Margerit			
Auguste Margerit			

== Sights ==
- Saint-Jean-Baptiste Church eleventh century, fifteenth century, sixteenth century
- Sainte-Reine Church nineteenth century
- The Valley of Allagnon

The Allagnon is a tributary of the Allier

== See also ==
- Communes of the Cantal department
