= Charles Ganilh =

French economist and politician (1758–1836)

Charles Ganilh (6 January 1758 – 1836) was a French economist and politician. Ganilh was born at Allanche in Cantal. He was educated for a profession in law and practised as avocat. During the troubled period which culminated in the storming of the Bastille on 14 July 1789, he became prominent in public affairs and was one of the seven members of the permanent Committee of Public Safety. Ganilh was imprisoned during the Reign of Terror and was only released by the counter-revolution of the 9th Thermidor. During the first consulate he was called to the tribunate but was excluded in 1802. In 1815 he was elected deputy for Cantal and finally left the Chamber on its dissolution in 1823.

Ganilh is best known as the most vigorous defender of the mercantile school in opposition to the views of Adam Smith and the English economists. The mercantilists were believers in nations keeping a positive balance of trade at all times in order to prosper, economically. However, they also valued the maximization of the national domestic resources of that nation and a total ban on the export of gold and silver. In pursuit of the positive balance of trade they recommended expansion of the colonial system, exclusivity of trade with the colonies and forbidding trade carried in foreign ships. Britain attempted to follow the mercantilists' suggestions and found themselves involved in frequent trade wars like the four Anglo-Dutch Navigation Wars.

On the scale of the individual sale, the mercantilists believed that profit arose only during the sale of commodities by the seller over-charging the buyer. Thus, Ganilh says that "exchange or trade alone gives value to things." In his mercantile outlook, Ganilh rejected the general labor theory of Adam Smith and David Ricardo in which commodities have value from the beginning. Commodities obtain value only through the labor that is used to prepare the commodity for market.

His works on political economy include Essai politique sur le revenue des peuples de l'antiquité, du moyen âge, &c. (1808), Des systèmes d'économie politique (1809), Théorie d'économie politique (1815), and Dictionnaire analytique d'économie politique (1826).
