= Ségur-les-Villas =

Commune in Auvergne-Rhône-Alpes, France

- Commune
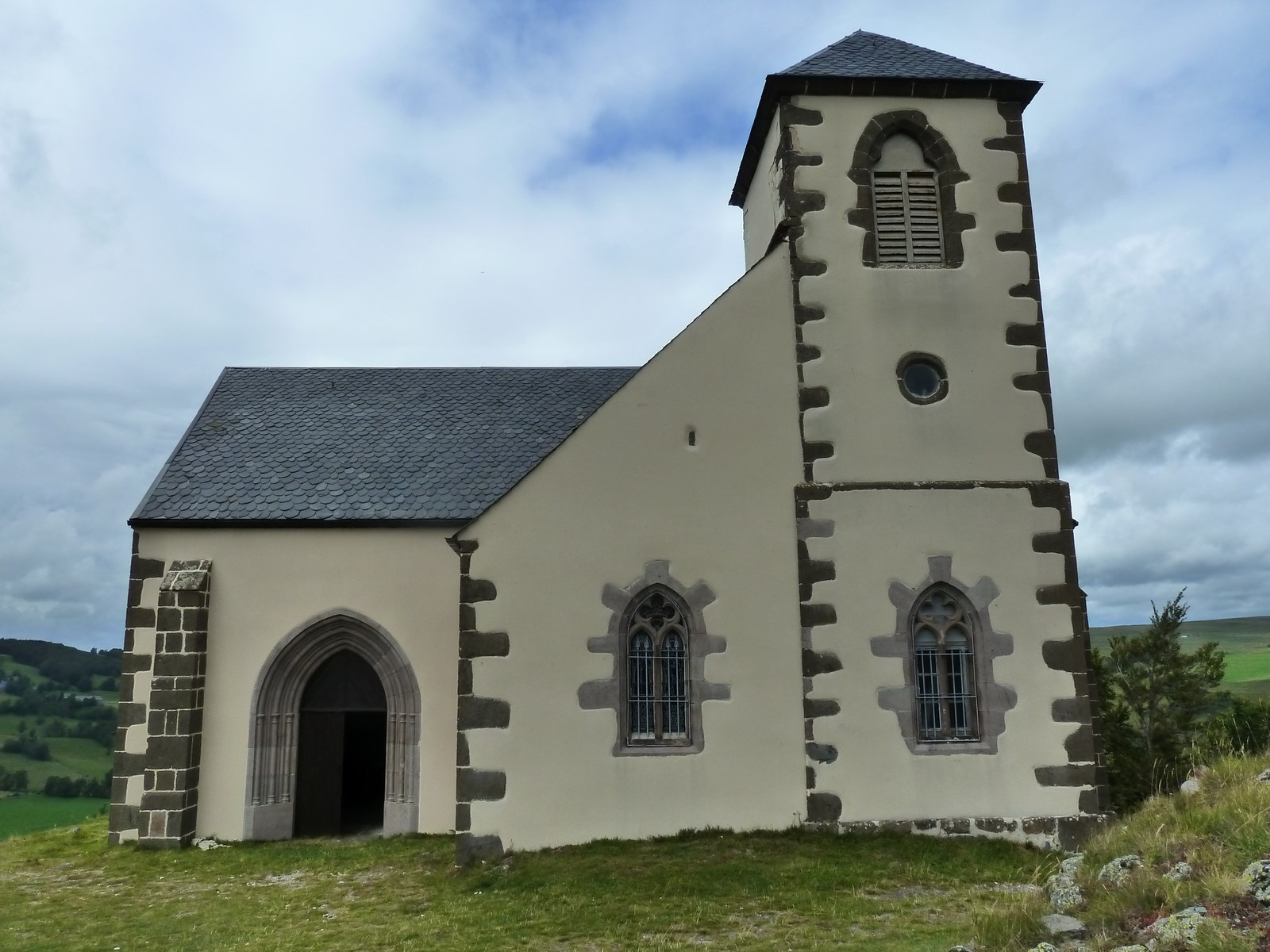
- The Chapel of our lady of Valentine, in Ségur-les-Villas
- Location of Ségur-les-Villas
- Location within France Location within Auvergne-Rhône-Alpes
- Coordinates: 45°13′35″N 2°49′06″E
- Country: France
- Region: Auvergne-Rhône-Alpes
- Department: Cantal
- Arrondissement: Saint-Flour
- Canton: Murat
- Intercommunality: Hautes Terres

Government
  - Mayor (2020–2026): Gilles Amat
- Area^{1}: 26.69 km^{2} (10.31 sq mi)
- Elevation: 1,046 m (3,432 ft)
- Highest elevation: 1,289 m (4,229 ft)
- Lowest elevation: 960 m (3,150 ft)
- Population (2023): 215
  - Density: 8.06/km^{2} (20.9/sq mi)
- Time zone: UTC+01:00 (CET)
  - Summer (DST): UTC+02:00 (CEST)
- INSEE/Postal code: 15225 /15300
- ^{1} French Land Register data, which excludes lakes, ponds, glaciers > 1 km^{2} (0.386 sq mi or 247 acres) and river estuaries.

Ségur-les-Villas is a commune in the Cantal department in south-central France.

== Population ==
Historical population
Year	Pop.	±% p.a.
1968	529	—
1975	434	−2.79%
1982	404	−1.02%
1990	318	−2.95%
1999	270	−1.80%
2007	224	−2.31%
2012	225	+0.09%
2017	202	−2.13%
2023	215	+1.04%
Source: INSEE

== See also ==
- Communes of the Cantal department
