= Chavagnac, Cantal =

Chavagnac
- Commune
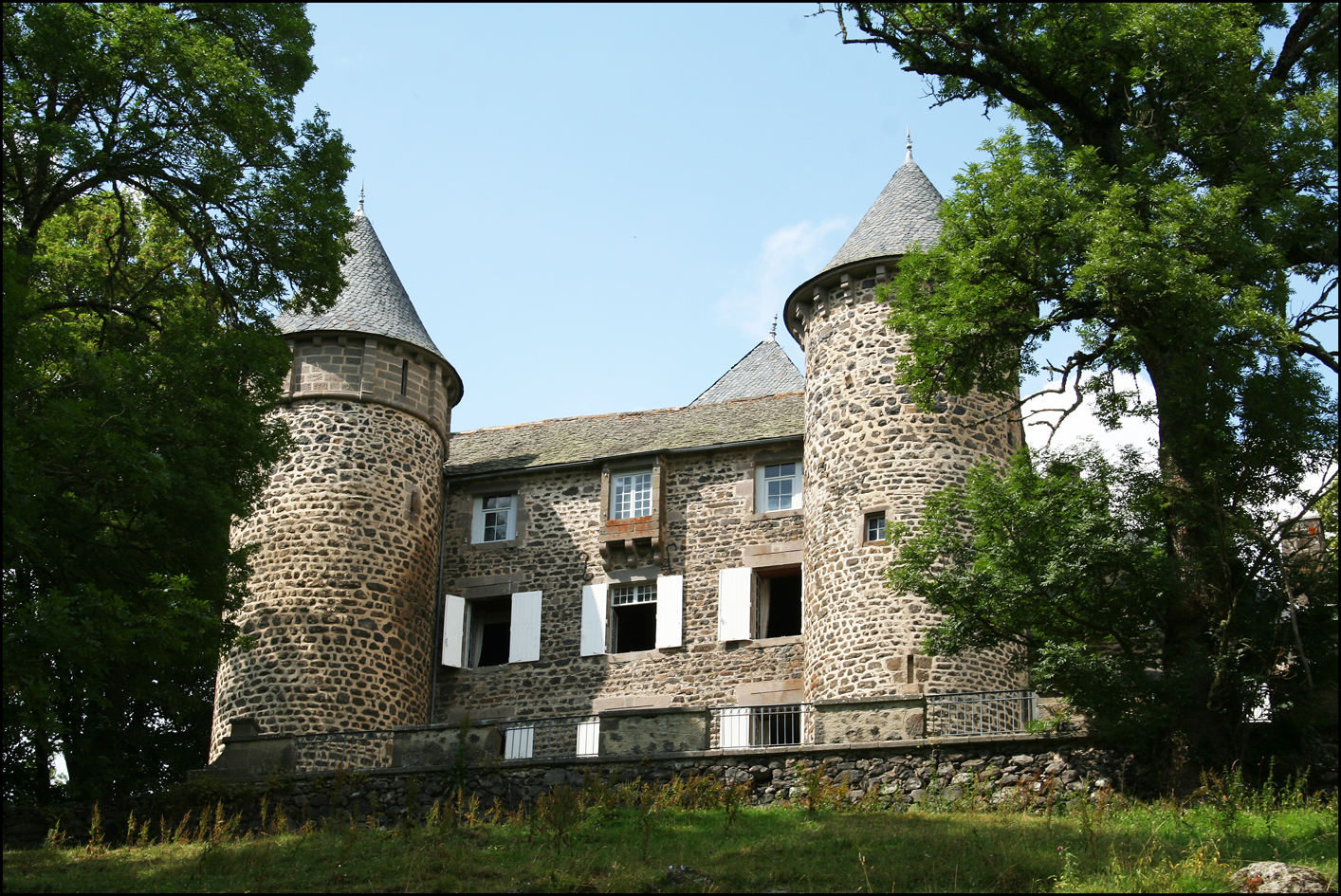
- The Château of Chavagnac
- Location of Chavagnac
- Location within France Location within Auvergne-Rhône-Alpes
- Coordinates: 45°09′16″N 2°52′58″E
- Country: France
- Region: Auvergne-Rhône-Alpes
- Department: Cantal
- Arrondissement: Saint-Flour
- Canton: Murat
- Area^{1}: 16.58 km^{2} (6.40 sq mi)
- Elevation: 1,095 m (3,593 ft)
- Highest elevation: 1,284 m (4,213 ft)
- Lowest elevation: 1,053 m (3,455 ft)
- Population (2023): 88
  - Density: 5.3/km^{2} (14/sq mi)
- Time zone: UTC+01:00 (CET)
  - Summer (DST): UTC+02:00 (CEST)
- INSEE/Postal code: 15047 /15300
- ^{1} French Land Register data, which excludes lakes, ponds, glaciers > 1 km^{2} (0.386 sq mi or 247 acres) and river estuaries.

Chavagnac (French pronunciation: [ʃavaɲak]; Auvergnat: Chavanhac) is a commune in the Cantal department in south-central France. Between December 2016 and January 2025, it was part of Neussargues en Pinatelle.

== Population ==
Historical population
Year	Pop.	±% p.a.
1968	133	—
1975	122	−1.23%
1982	144	+2.40%
1990	129	−1.37%
1999	94	−3.46%
2007	103	+1.15%
2012	108	+0.95%
2017	103	−0.94%
2023	88	−2.59%
Source: INSEE

== See also ==
- Communes of the Cantal department
