= Neussargues en Pinatelle =

Commune in Auvergne-Rhône-Alpes, France

- Former commune
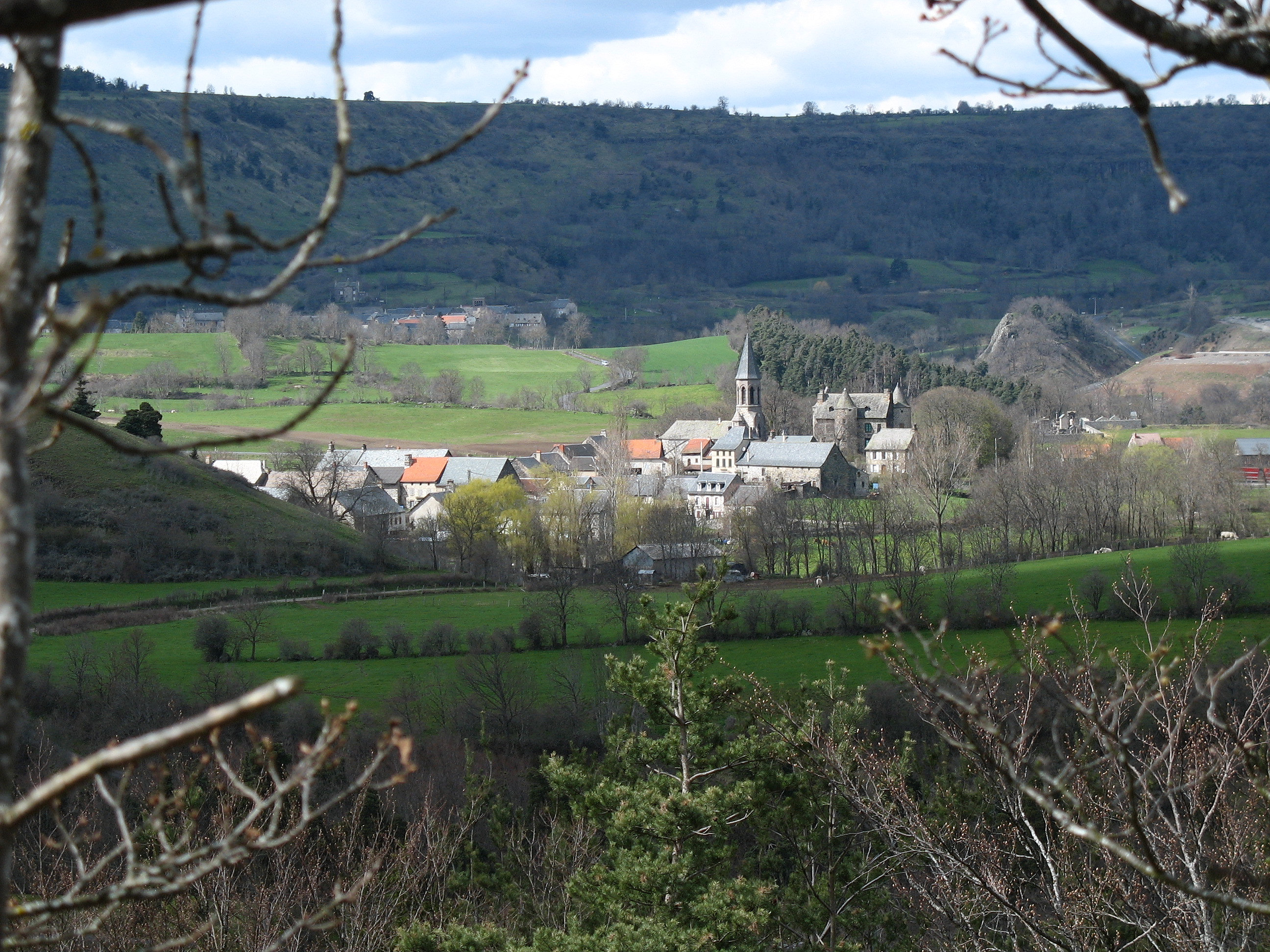
- A general view of Neussargues
- Location of Neussargues en Pinatelle
- Location within France Location within Auvergne-Rhône-Alpes
- Coordinates: 45°07′45″N 2°58′37″E
- Country: France
- Region: Auvergne-Rhône-Alpes
- Department: Cantal
- Arrondissement: Saint-Flour
- Canton: Murat
- Intercommunality: Hautes Terres
- Area^{1}: 91.98 km^{2} (35.51 sq mi)
- Population (2023): 824
  - Density: 8.96/km^{2} (23.2/sq mi)
- Time zone: UTC+01:00 (CET)
  - Summer (DST): UTC+02:00 (CEST)
- INSEE/Postal code: 15141 /15170
- ^{1} French Land Register data, which excludes lakes, ponds, glaciers > 1 km^{2} (0.386 sq mi or 247 acres) and river estuaries.

Neussargues en Pinatelle (French pronunciation: [nøsaʁɡ ɑ̃ pinatɛl], lit. 'Neussargues in Pinatelle'; Auvergnat: Nuçargues en Pinatèla) is a former commune in the Cantal department in south-central France. The commune was established on 1 December 2016 and consists of the former communes of Celles, Chalinargues, Chavagnac, Neussargues-Moissac and Sainte-Anastasie. On 1 January 2025, the commune was disbanded, and the five former communes were recreated.

== See also ==
- Communes of the Cantal department
