= Ussel, Cantal =

Commune in Auvergne-Rhône-Alpes, France

Ussel
- Commune
- Location of Ussel
- Location within France Location within Auvergne-Rhône-Alpes
- Coordinates: 45°04′54″N 2°56′11″E
- Country: France
- Region: Auvergne-Rhône-Alpes
- Department: Cantal
- Arrondissement: Saint-Flour
- Canton: Murat

Government
  - Mayor (2020–2026): Nadine Janvier
- Area^{1}: 10.34 km^{2} (3.99 sq mi)
- Elevation: 1,026 m (3,366 ft)
- Highest elevation: 1,086 m (3,563 ft)
- Lowest elevation: 959 m (3,146 ft)
- Population (2023): 453
  - Density: 43.8/km^{2} (113/sq mi)
- Time zone: UTC+01:00 (CET)
  - Summer (DST): UTC+02:00 (CEST)
- INSEE/Postal code: 15244 /15300
- ^{1} French Land Register data, which excludes lakes, ponds, glaciers > 1 km^{2} (0.386 sq mi or 247 acres) and river estuaries.

Ussel (French pronunciation: [ysɛl]; Occitan: Ussèl) is a commune in the département of Cantal in south-central France.

== Population ==
Historical population
Year	Pop.	±% p.a.
1968	344	—
1975	314	−1.30%
1982	321	+0.32%
1990	400	+2.79%
1999	437	+0.99%
2007	467	+0.83%
2012	482	+0.63%
2017	479	−0.12%
2023	453	−0.93%
Source: INSEE

== See also ==
- Communes of the Cantal department
