= Laveissenet =

Commune in Auvergne-Rhône-Alpes, France

- Commune
- Location of Laveissenet
- Location within France Location within Auvergne-Rhône-Alpes
- Coordinates: 45°04′56″N 2°53′23″E
- Country: France
- Region: Auvergne-Rhône-Alpes
- Department: Cantal
- Arrondissement: Saint-Flour
- Canton: Murat
- Intercommunality: Hautes Terres

Government
  - Mayor (2020–2026): Claire Teissedre
- Area^{1}: 10.79 km^{2} (4.17 sq mi)
- Elevation: 100 m (330 ft)
- Highest elevation: 1,480 m (4,860 ft)
- Lowest elevation: 949 m (3,114 ft)
- Population (2023): 137
  - Density: 12.7/km^{2} (32.9/sq mi)
- Time zone: UTC+01:00 (CET)
  - Summer (DST): UTC+02:00 (CEST)
- INSEE/Postal code: 15100 /15300
- ^{1} French Land Register data, which excludes lakes, ponds, glaciers > 1 km^{2} (0.386 sq mi or 247 acres) and river estuaries.

Laveissenet (French pronunciation: [lavɛsnɛ]; Occitan: La Vaissanet) is a commune in the Cantal department in south-central France.

== Population ==
Historical population
Year	Pop.	±% p.a.
1968	165	—
1975	149	−1.45%
1982	144	−0.49%
1990	116	−2.67%
1999	104	−1.21%
2007	91	−1.66%
2012	98	+1.49%
2017	130	+5.81%
2023	137	+0.88%
Source: INSEE

== See also ==
- Communes of the Cantal department
