= Charmensac =

Commune in Auvergne-Rhône-Alpes, France

- Commune
- Location of Charmensac
- Location within France Location within Auvergne-Rhône-Alpes
- Coordinates: 45°13′03″N 3°05′20″E
- Country: France
- Region: Auvergne-Rhône-Alpes
- Department: Cantal
- Arrondissement: Saint-Flour
- Canton: Murat

Government
  - Mayor (2020–2026): Christophe Soulier
- Area^{1}: 15.17 km^{2} (5.86 sq mi)
- Elevation: 901 m (2,956 ft)
- Highest elevation: 1,104 m (3,622 ft)
- Lowest elevation: 649 m (2,129 ft)
- Population (2023): 71
  - Density: 4.7/km^{2} (12/sq mi)
- Time zone: UTC+01:00 (CET)
  - Summer (DST): UTC+02:00 (CEST)
- INSEE/Postal code: 15043 /15500
- ^{1} French Land Register data, which excludes lakes, ponds, glaciers > 1 km^{2} (0.386 sq mi or 247 acres) and river estuaries.

Charmensac (French pronunciation: [ʃaʁmɑ̃sak]; Occitan: Charmençac) is a commune in the Cantal department in south-central France.

== Population ==
Historical population
Year	Pop.	±% p.a.
1968	164	—
1975	140	−2.23%
1982	118	−2.41%
1990	118	+0.00%
1999	130	+1.08%
2007	97	−3.59%
2012	82	−3.30%
2017	85	+0.72%
2023	71	−2.95%
Source: INSEE

== See also ==
- Communes of the Cantal department
