= Le Claux =

Commune in Auvergne-Rhône-Alpes, France

- Commune
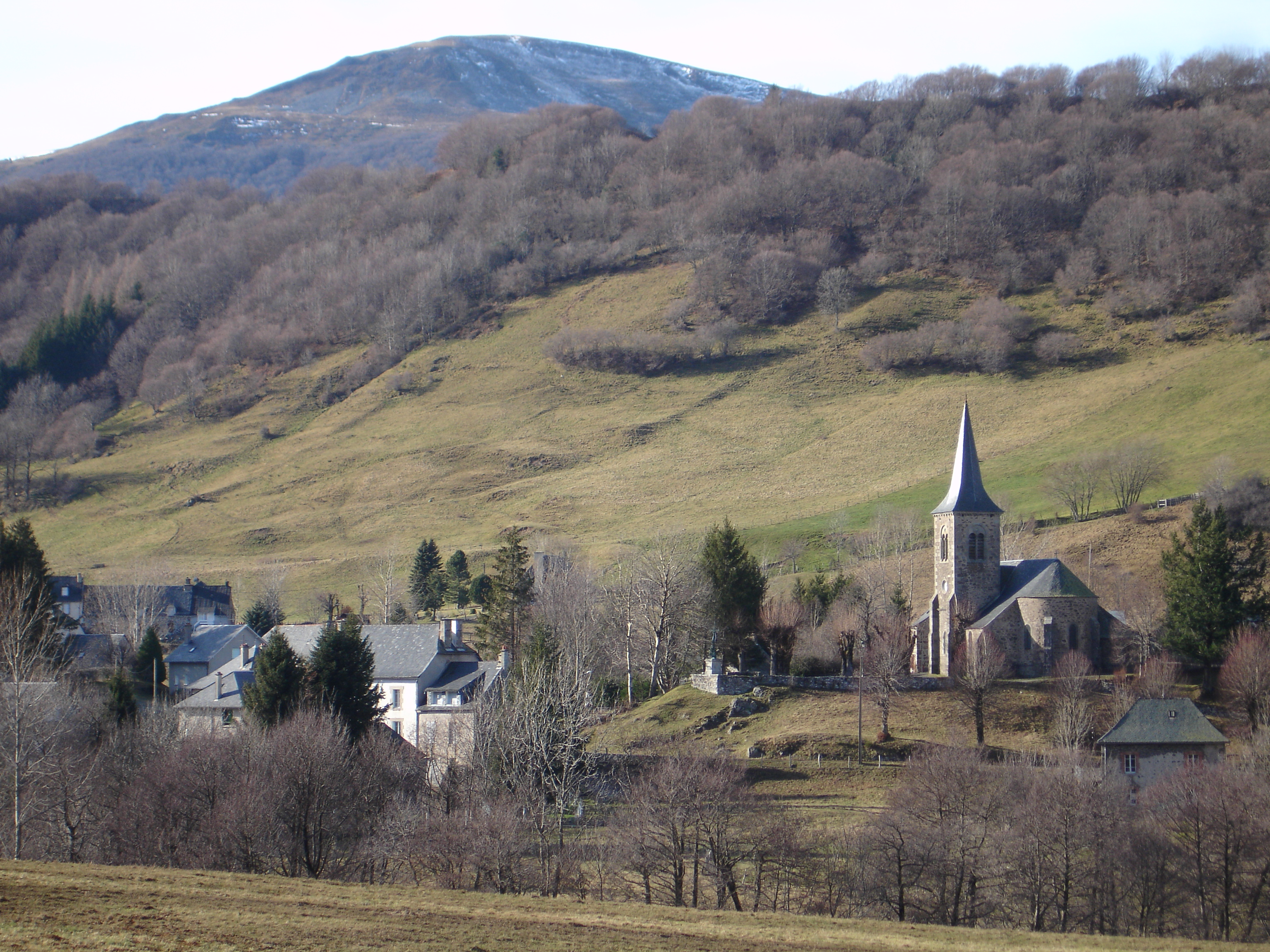
- The church and surrounding buildings in Le Claux
- Location of Le Claux
- Location within France Location within Auvergne-Rhône-Alpes
- Coordinates: 45°09′38″N 2°42′22″E
- Country: France
- Region: Auvergne-Rhône-Alpes
- Department: Cantal
- Arrondissement: Saint-Flour
- Canton: Murat
- Intercommunality: Pays Gentiane

Government
  - Mayor (2020–2026): Guy Loubeyre
- Area^{1}: 28.07 km^{2} (10.84 sq mi)
- Elevation: 1,037 m (3,402 ft)
- Highest elevation: 1,780 m (5,840 ft)
- Lowest elevation: 994 m (3,261 ft)
- Population (2023): 160
  - Density: 5.7/km^{2} (15/sq mi)
- Time zone: UTC+01:00 (CET)
  - Summer (DST): UTC+02:00 (CEST)
- INSEE/Postal code: 15050 /15400
- ^{1} French Land Register data, which excludes lakes, ponds, glaciers > 1 km^{2} (0.386 sq mi or 247 acres) and river estuaries.

Le Claux (French pronunciation: [lə klo]; Occitan: Lo Claus) is a commune in the Cantal department in south-central France. It is located in Auvergne, in the department of Cantal.

It is located in the Massif central, specifically in the monts du Cantal. Because of its location in between the mountains, snowfall is heavy, which has given it the nickname of "village de Neige" (French for "village of snow").

== Population ==
Historical population
Year	Pop.	±% p.a.
1968	405	—
1975	352	−1.98%
1982	341	−0.45%
1990	293	−1.88%
1999	260	−1.32%
2007	220	−2.07%
2012	205	−1.40%
2017	181	−2.46%
2023	160	−2.03%
Source: INSEE

== See also ==
- Communes of the Cantal department
