= Lavigerie, Cantal =

Commune in Auvergne-Rhône-Alpes, France

Lavigerie
- Commune
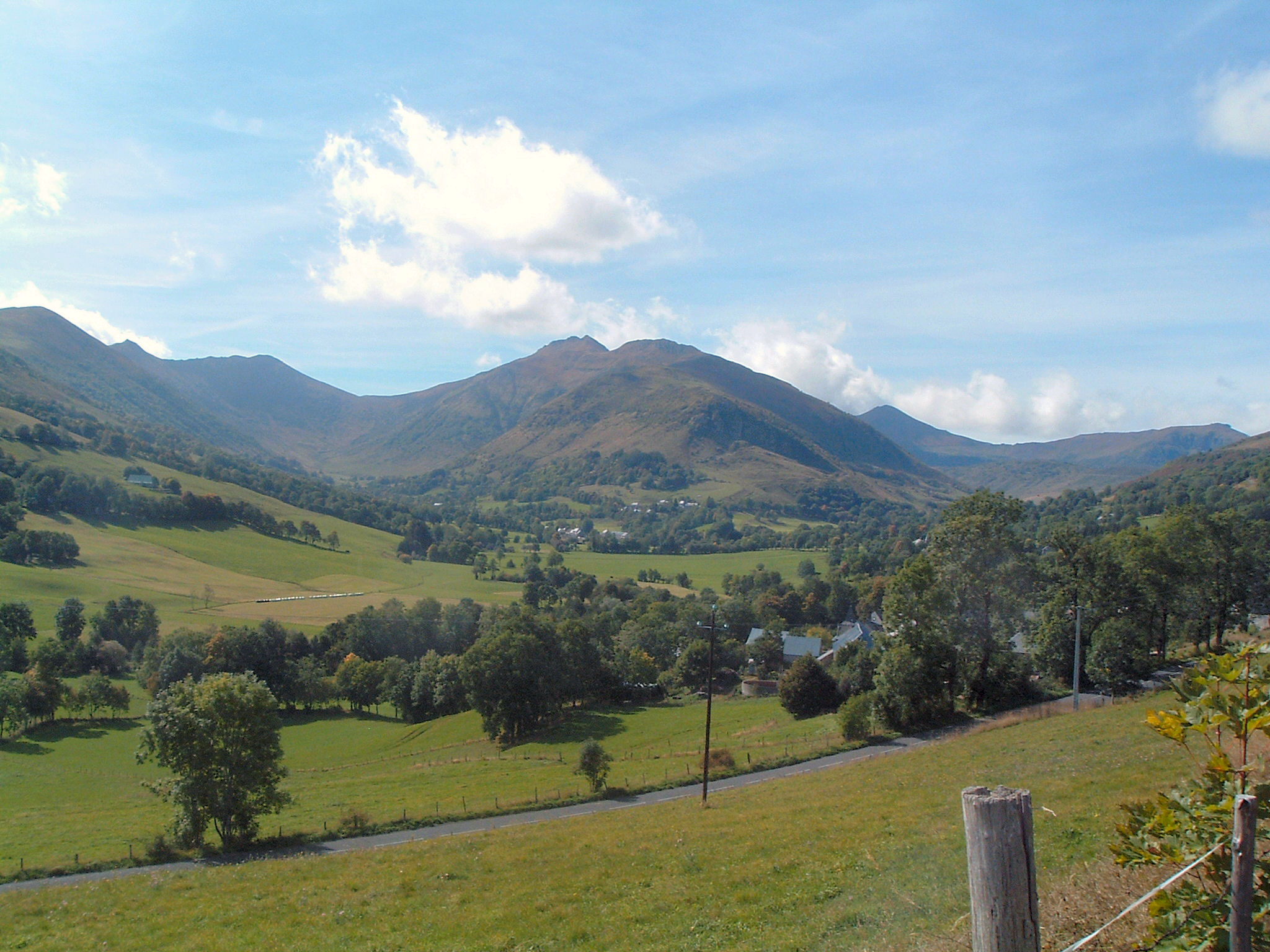
- A general view of Lavigerie
- Location of Lavigerie
- Location within France Location within Auvergne-Rhône-Alpes
- Coordinates: 45°08′20″N 2°44′42″E
- Country: France
- Region: Auvergne-Rhône-Alpes
- Department: Cantal
- Arrondissement: Saint-Flour
- Canton: Murat
- Intercommunality: Hautes Terres

Government
  - Mayor (2020–2026): Denis Delpirou
- Area^{1}: 24.25 km^{2} (9.36 sq mi)
- Elevation: 1,075 m (3,527 ft)
- Highest elevation: 1,773 m (5,817 ft)
- Lowest elevation: 1,054 m (3,458 ft)
- Population (2023): 116
  - Density: 4.78/km^{2} (12.4/sq mi)
- Time zone: UTC+01:00 (CET)
  - Summer (DST): UTC+02:00 (CEST)
- INSEE/Postal code: 15102 /15300
- ^{1} French Land Register data, which excludes lakes, ponds, glaciers > 1 km^{2} (0.386 sq mi or 247 acres) and river estuaries.

Lavigerie (French pronunciation: [laviʒʁi]; Occitan: La Vijairá) is a commune in the Cantal department in south-central France.

== Population ==
Historical population
Year	Pop.	±% p.a.
1968	231	—
1975	181	−3.42%
1982	147	−2.93%
1990	121	−2.40%
1999	102	−1.88%
2007	102	+0.00%
2012	105	+0.58%
2017	107	+0.38%
2023	116	+1.36%
Source: INSEE

== See also ==
- Communes of the Cantal department
