= Sainte-Anastasie, Cantal =

Sainte-Anastasie
- Commune
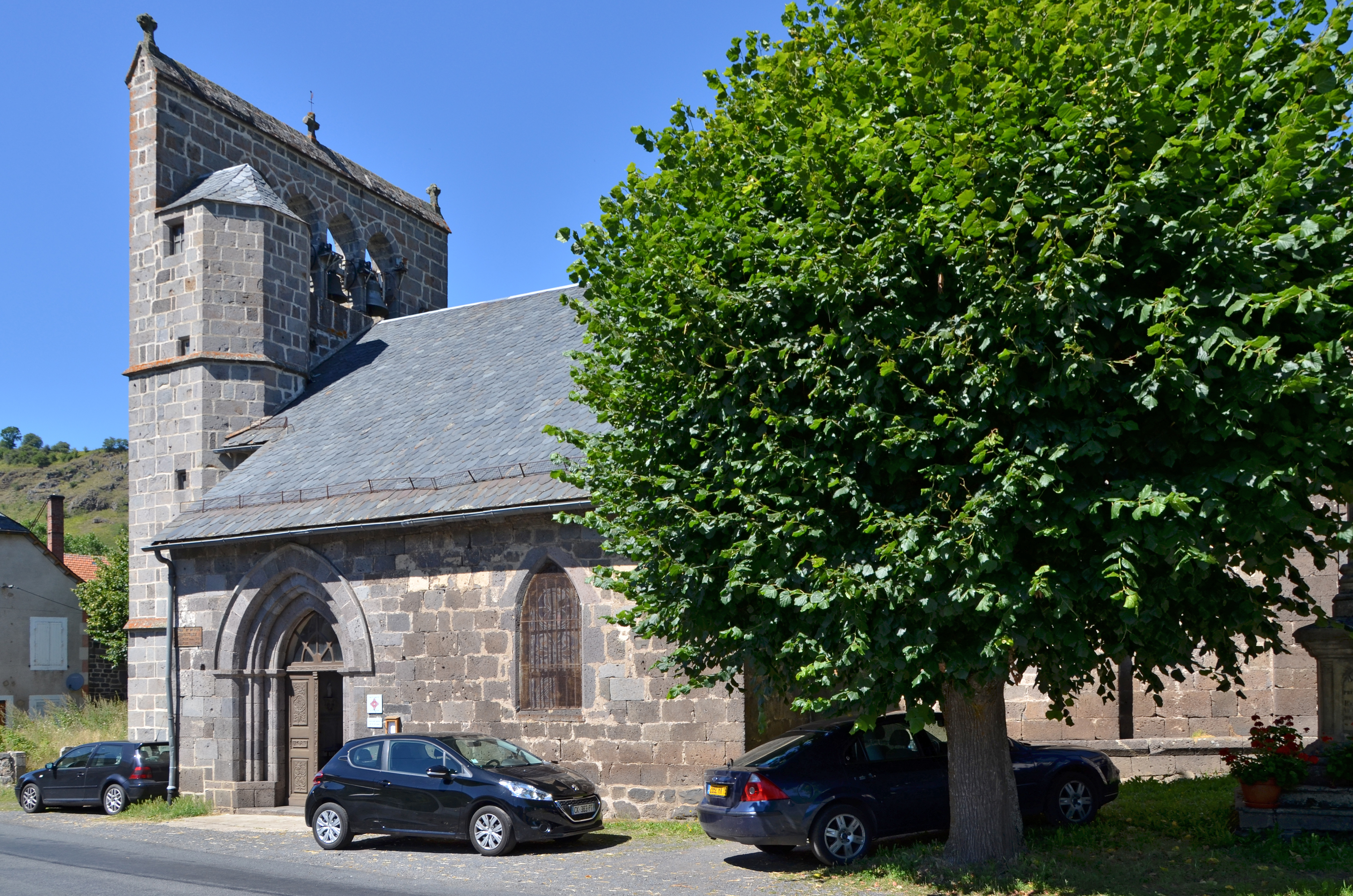
- The church in Sainte-Anastasie

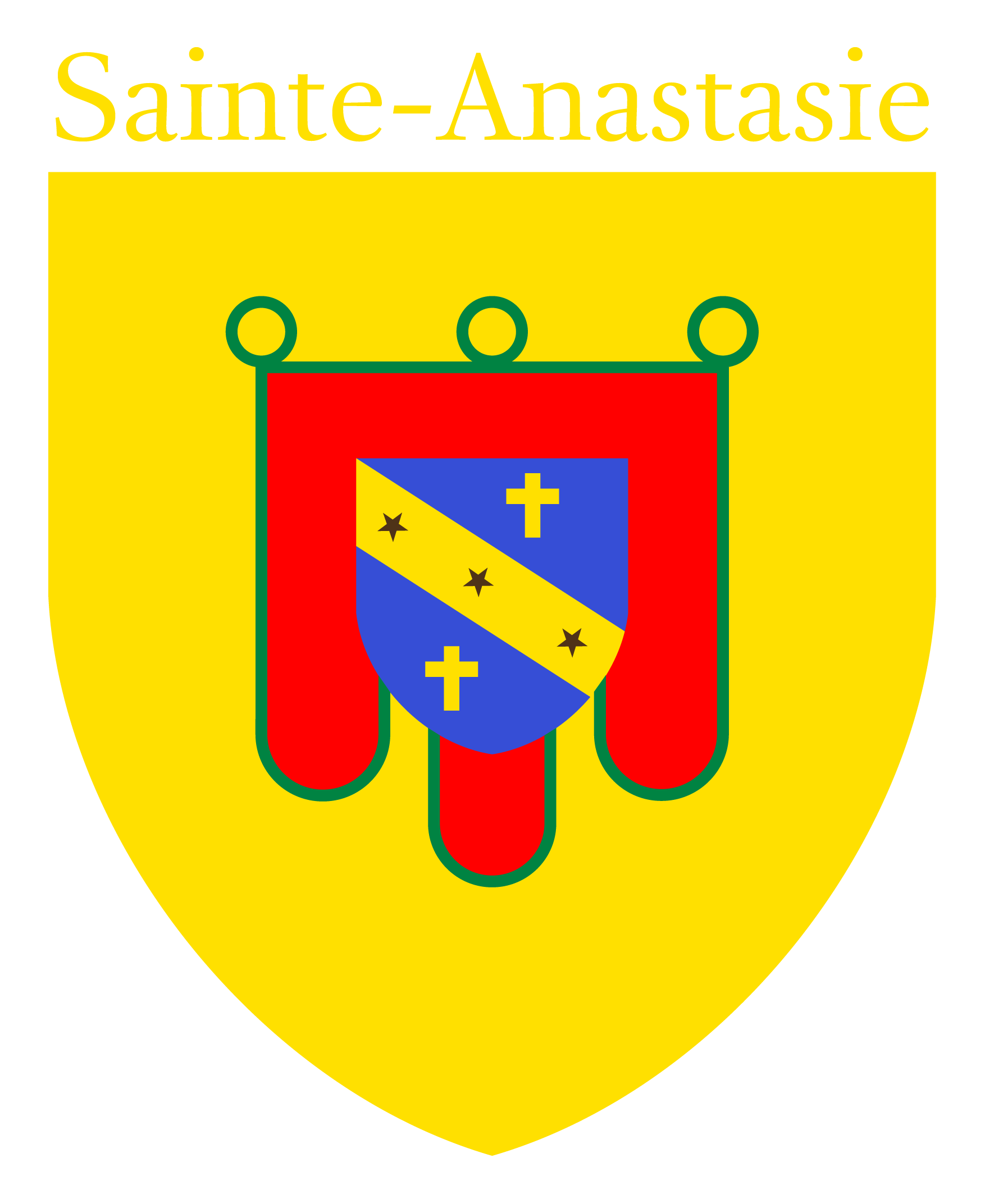
- Coat of arms
- Location of Sainte-Anastasie
- Location within France Location within Auvergne-Rhône-Alpes
- Coordinates: 45°10′24″N 2°58′15″E
- Country: France
- Region: Auvergne-Rhône-Alpes
- Department: Cantal
- Arrondissement: Saint-Flour
- Canton: Murat
- Area^{1}: 15.88 km^{2} (6.13 sq mi)
- Elevation: 875 m (2,871 ft)
- Highest elevation: 1,200 m (3,900 ft)
- Lowest elevation: 839 m (2,753 ft)
- Population (2023): 122
  - Density: 7.68/km^{2} (19.9/sq mi)
- Time zone: UTC+01:00 (CET)
  - Summer (DST): UTC+02:00 (CEST)
- INSEE/Postal code: 15171 /15170
- ^{1} French Land Register data, which excludes lakes, ponds, glaciers > 1 km^{2} (0.386 sq mi or 247 acres) and river estuaries.

Sainte-Anastasie (French pronunciation: [sɛ̃t anastazi]; Auvergnat: Senta Ostàsia) is a commune in the Cantal department in south-central France. Between December 2016 and January 2025, it was part of Neussargues en Pinatelle.

== Population ==
Historical population
Year	Pop.	±% p.a.
1968	261	—
1975	236	−1.43%
1982	207	−1.86%
1990	189	−1.13%
1999	167	−1.37%
2007	155	−0.93%
2012	139	−2.16%
2017	146	+0.99%
2023	122	−2.95%
Source: INSEE

== See also ==
- Communes of the Cantal department
