= Pradiers =

Commune in Auvergne-Rhône-Alpes, France

- Commune
- Location of Pradiers
- Location within France Location within Auvergne-Rhône-Alpes
- Coordinates: 45°16′14″N 2°55′31″E
- Country: France
- Region: Auvergne-Rhône-Alpes
- Department: Cantal
- Arrondissement: Saint-Flour
- Canton: Murat

Government
  - Mayor (2020–2026): Luc Lescure
- Area^{1}: 23.61 km^{2} (9.12 sq mi)
- Elevation: 1,140 m (3,740 ft)
- Highest elevation: 1,405 m (4,610 ft)
- Lowest elevation: 1,039 m (3,409 ft)
- Population (2023): 81
  - Density: 3.4/km^{2} (8.9/sq mi)
- Time zone: UTC+01:00 (CET)
  - Summer (DST): UTC+02:00 (CEST)
- INSEE/Postal code: 15155 /15160
- ^{1} French Land Register data, which excludes lakes, ponds, glaciers > 1 km^{2} (0.386 sq mi or 247 acres) and river estuaries.

Pradiers (French pronunciation: [pʁadje]; Occitan: Pradèirs) is a commune in the Cantal department in south-central France.

== Population ==
Historical population
Year	Pop.	±% p.a.
1968	209	—
1975	174	−2.58%
1982	134	−3.66%
1990	117	−1.68%
1999	111	−0.58%
2007	109	−0.23%
2012	91	−3.55%
2017	89	−0.44%
2023	81	−1.56%
Source: INSEE

== See also ==
- Communes of the Cantal department
