= Murat, Cantal =

Commune in Auvergne-Rhône-Alpes, France

Murat
- Commune
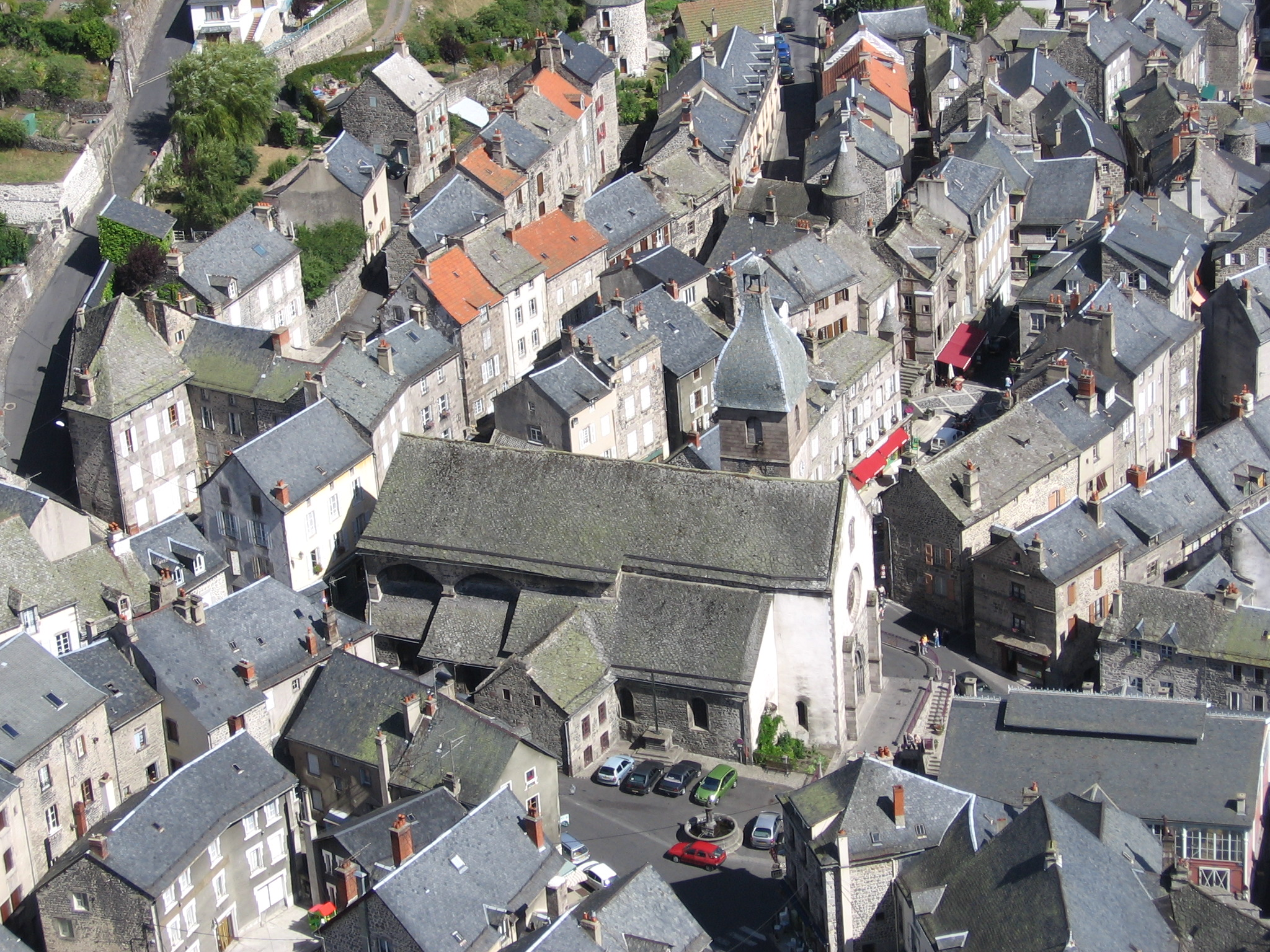
- The church and surrounding buildings, in Murat

- Coat of arms
- Location of Murat
- Location within France Location within Auvergne-Rhône-Alpes
- Coordinates: 45°06′38″N 2°52′10″E
- Country: France
- Region: Auvergne-Rhône-Alpes
- Department: Cantal
- Arrondissement: Saint-Flour
- Canton: Murat
- Intercommunality: Hautes Terres Communauté

Government
  - Mayor (2020–2026): Gilles Chabrier
- Area^{1}: 20.26 km^{2} (7.82 sq mi)
- Highest elevation: 1,163 m (3,816 ft)
- Lowest elevation: 868 m (2,848 ft)
- Population (2023): 1,770
  - Density: 87.4/km^{2} (226/sq mi)
- Time zone: UTC+01:00 (CET)
  - Summer (DST): UTC+02:00 (CEST)
- INSEE/Postal code: 15138 /15300
- ^{1} French Land Register data, which excludes lakes, ponds, glaciers > 1 km^{2} (0.386 sq mi or 247 acres) and river estuaries.

Murat (French pronunciation: [myʁa]) is a commune in the Cantal department in the Auvergne region in south-central France. On 1 January 2017, the former commune of Chastel-sur-Murat was merged into Murat. Murat is the administrative seat of this new commune.

== History ==
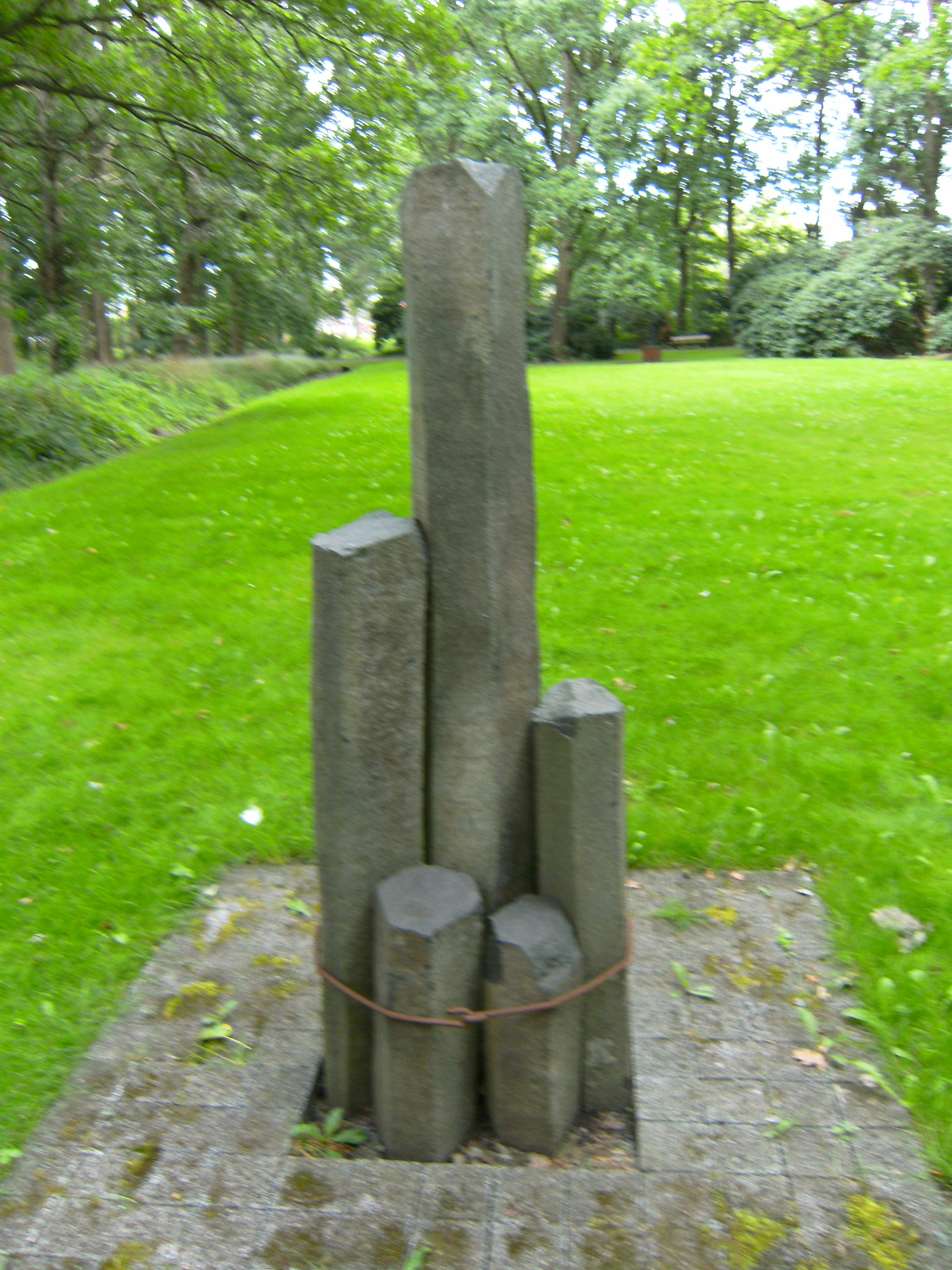
Hamburg, Memorial of Neuengamme concentration camp: memorial area, monument for the deported and murdered Maquis of Murat (Cantal)

On 24 June 1944, during World War II, 120 Muratais were deported, 80 never returned.

The French people from Murat were deported via Compiègne to the Neuengamme concentration camp and most of them had to work in the subcamp (in German: Außenlager) Farge concentration camp. At begin of June, 2012 a monument in the Memorial wood on the gardening area of former concentration camp was established: It was donated by the city of Murat, to remember what happened in Murat and to commemorate the deported and murdered inhabitants. The columns of basalt remember July 1944 when the Maquisards from Murat, Cantal were deported and afterwards murdered in the Neuengamme concentration camp and its affiliates. In total 75 men out of 103 died in the concentration camp.

== Geography ==
=== Location ===
Murat is situated on the eastern edge of the Mounts of Cantal, in the valley of the Alagnon, a tributary of the Allier, which was the principal route for crossing the Massif Central. It is surrounded by three basalt outcrops, the vestiges of former volcanoes, the Rocher de Bredons, where there is a priory church dating from the 12th century, the rocher de Bonnevie, where there is an 8-metre high statue of the Virgin Mary known as Notre-Dame de la Haute-Auvergne, and the Rocher de Chastel, where the 12th century chapel of St Antoine stands. A market is held every Friday.

== Population ==
Historical population
Year	Pop.	±% p.a.
1968	2,741	—
1975	2,731	−0.05%
1982	2,541	−1.02%
1990	2,509	−0.16%
1999	2,249	−1.21%
2007	2,182	−0.38%
2012	2,039	−1.35%
2017	1,878	−1.63%
2023	1,770	−0.98%
Source: INSEE

Population data refer to the area corresponding with the commune as of January 2025.

== Administration ==
Mayor (maire in French) of the municipal council:

Name	Start	End	Notes
Martine Mahtouk	2001	2008	
Emmanuel Grèze	1983	2001	Former General councillor(Conseiller général); Conseiller Régional
Jean Meyniel	1977	1983	
Antoine Tabayse	1969	1977	
Joseph Constant	1968	1969	
Hector Peschaud	1946	1968	
Antoine Combes	1944	1946	
Hector Peschaud	1928	1944	
Gabriel Peschaud	1897	1928	Député
Raymond Teissèdre	1896	1897	
Leon Auguste Teillard Chabrier	1895	1896	
Maurice guibal	1881	1895	républicain General councillor (conseiller général)
Pierre Hector Veisseyre	12 February 1878		
Joseph Léon Dubois	3 November 1874		
Félix Robert	13 February 1874		
Pierre Hector Veisseyre	19 June 1871		
Alfred Talandier Espinasse	29 September 1856		
Identité=Emile Teissèdre	24 July 1852		
Jean Baptiste Rhodes	11 November 1848		
Pierre Duclos	2 May 1848		
Jules Teillard Laterisse	29 December 1843		
François Escaille	10 July 1833		
Antoine Talandier Lespinasse	11 October 1830		
Jean baptiste Marcombes	30 December 1825		
Identité=Pierre Maynobe	16 June 1819		
Jean Raymond Rancillac de Chazelles	11 November 1815		
Antoine Gazard	5 July 1815		
Claude Amable Tournier	5 June 1815		
Antoine Gazard	messidor an X		
Cérice Bonaventure Teillard Chambon	1st prairial an VII		
Municipalités de canton	From An IV to An VIII		
Joseph Dubois	11 brumaire an III		
François Teillard Beynac	2 December 1792		
Cérice Bonaventure Teillard Chambon	28 October 1792		
Antoine Dominique Chabanon	15 May 1791		
Antoine Roux	15 July 1790		
Etienne de Montreuil de Charmanière	9 February 1790		

== Personalities ==
- Olivier Magne
- Raymond Leopold Bruckberger, writer
- Henri de Castellane, politician. His grandson was Paul Ernest Boniface de Castellane who married Anna Gould

== See also ==
- Communes of the Cantal department
