= Mandailles-Saint-Julien =

Commune in Auvergne-Rhône-Alpes, France

- Commune
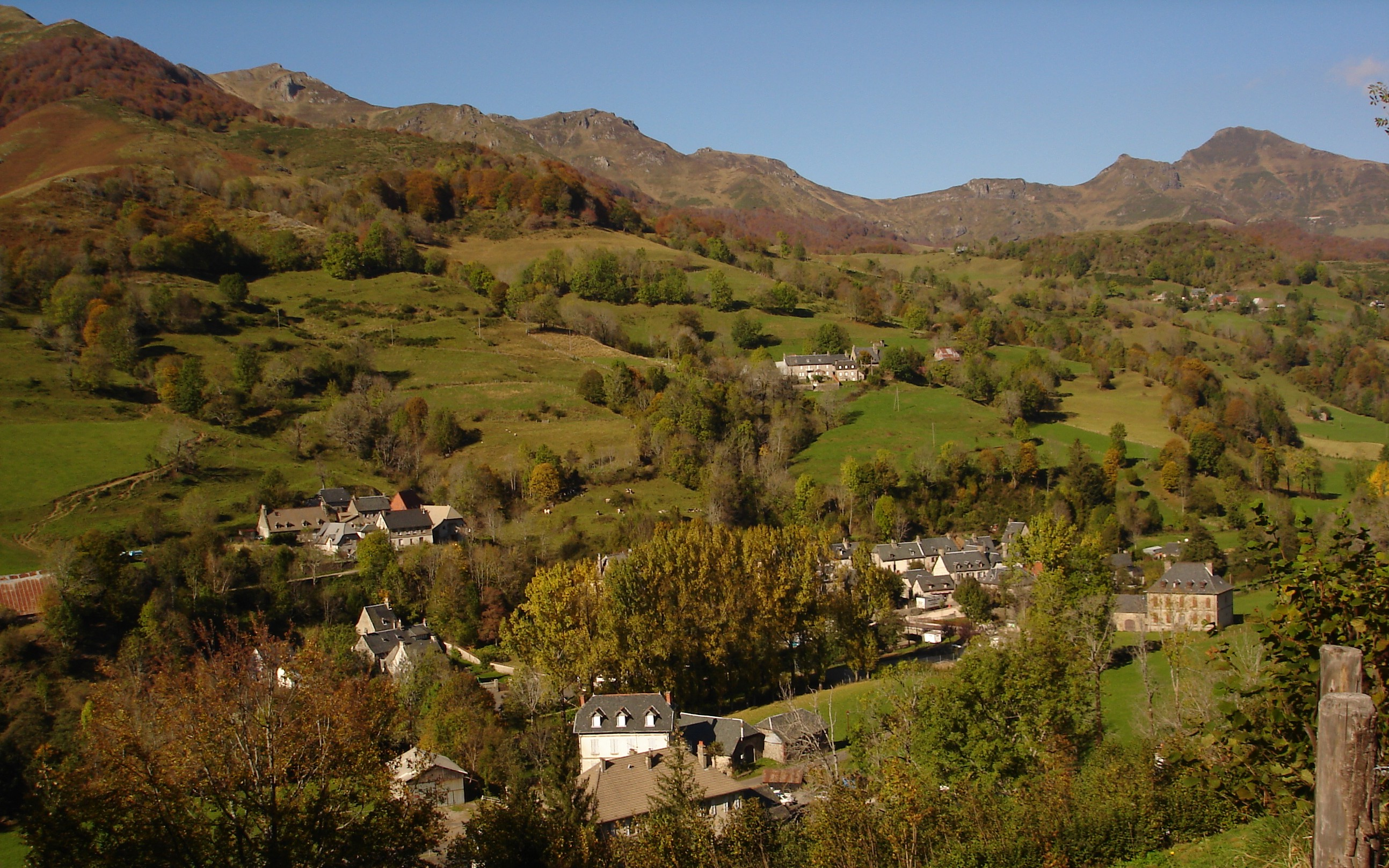
- A general view of Mandailles-Saint-Julien
- Location of Mandailles-Saint-Julien
- Location within France Location within Auvergne-Rhône-Alpes
- Coordinates: 45°04′09″N 2°39′25″E
- Country: France
- Region: Auvergne-Rhône-Alpes
- Department: Cantal
- Arrondissement: Aurillac
- Canton: Vic-sur-Cère
- Intercommunality: CA Aurillac Agglomération

Government
  - Mayor (2020–2026): Philippe Fabre
- Area^{1}: 35.37 km^{2} (13.66 sq mi)
- Elevation: 940 m (3,080 ft)
- Highest elevation: 1,780 m (5,840 ft)
- Lowest elevation: 837 m (2,746 ft)
- Population (2023): 172
  - Density: 4.86/km^{2} (12.6/sq mi)
- Time zone: UTC+01:00 (CET)
  - Summer (DST): UTC+02:00 (CEST)
- INSEE/Postal code: 15113 /15590
- ^{1} French Land Register data, which excludes lakes, ponds, glaciers > 1 km^{2} (0.386 sq mi or 247 acres) and river estuaries.

Mandailles-Saint-Julien (French pronunciation: [mɑ̃daj sɛ̃ ʒyljɛ̃]; Occitan: Mandalha e Sant Julian) is a commune in the Cantal department in south-central France.

== Population ==
Historical population
| Year | Pop. | ±% p.a. |
|---|---|---|
| 1968 | 527 | — |
| 1975 | 450 | −2.23% |
| 1982 | 363 | −3.02% |
| 1990 | 276 | −3.37% |
| 1999 | 226 | −2.20% |
| 2007 | 203 | −1.33% |
| 2012 | 193 | −1.01% |
| 2017 | 187 | −0.63% |
| 2023 | 172 | −1.38% |
Source: INSEE

== See also ==
- Communes of the Cantal department
