= Canton of Murat =

Coordinates: 45.11°N 2.87°E

- Canton
- Situation of the canton of Murat in the department of Cantal
- Country: France
- Region: Auvergne-Rhône-Alpes
- Department: Cantal
- No. of communes: {{{nbcomm}}}
- Population (2023): 7,638
- INSEE code: 1507

The canton of Murat is an administrative division of the Cantal department, southern France. Its borders were modified at the French canton reorganisation which came into effect in March 2015. Its seat is in Murat.

It consists of the following communes:

1. Albepierre-Bredons
2. Allanche
3. La Chapelle-d'Alagnon
4. Charmensac
5. Cheylade
6. Le Claux
7. Dienne
8. Joursac
9. Landeyrat
10. Laveissenet
11. Laveissière
12. Lavigerie
13. Murat
14. Neussargues en Pinatelle
15. Peyrusse
16. Pradiers
17. Saint-Saturnin
18. Ségur-les-Villas
19. Ussel
20. Vernols
21. Vèze
22. Virargues
