= Planèze of Saint-Flour =

French volcanic plateau

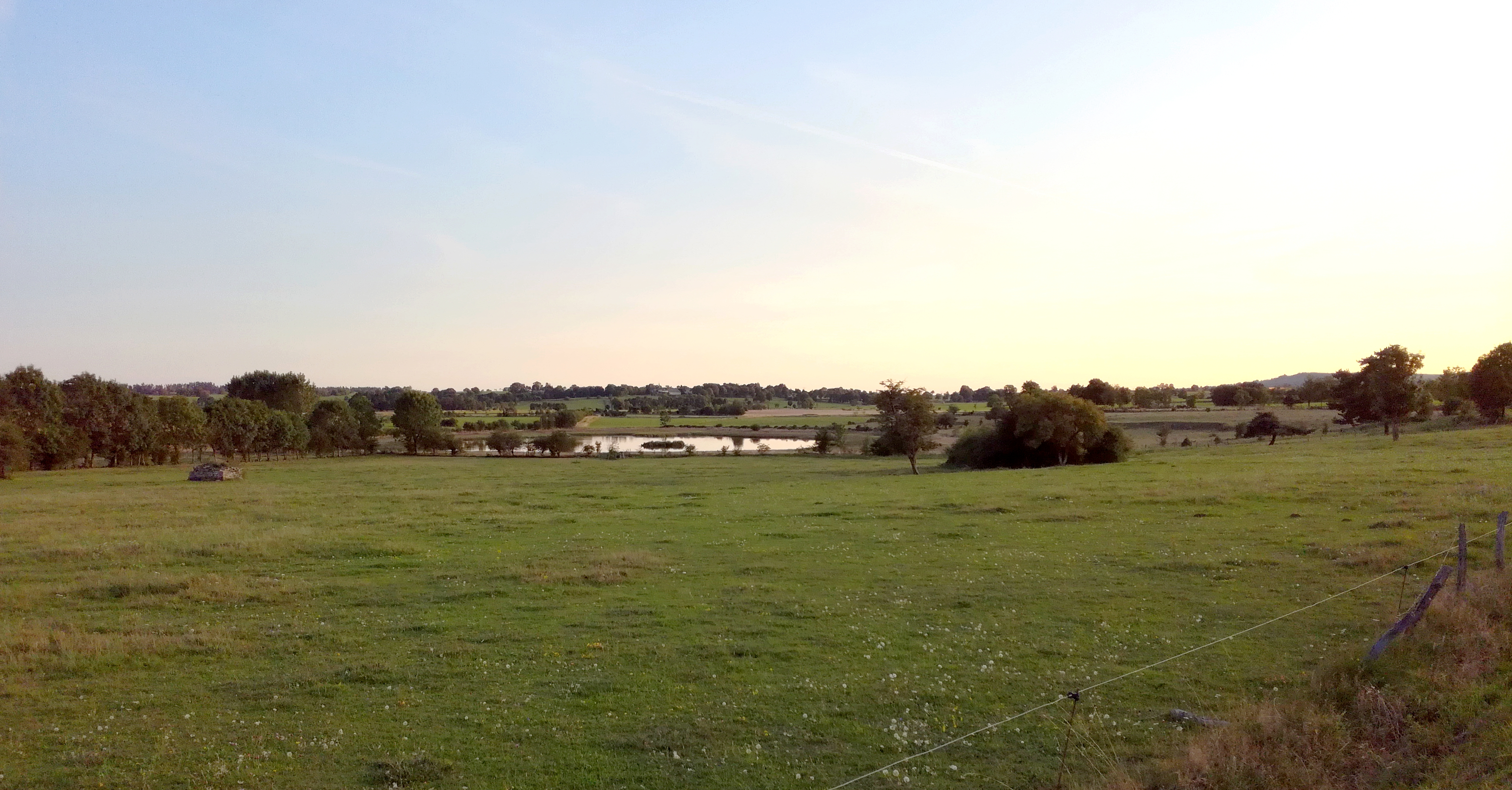
- The lake between Fressanges and Les Ternes

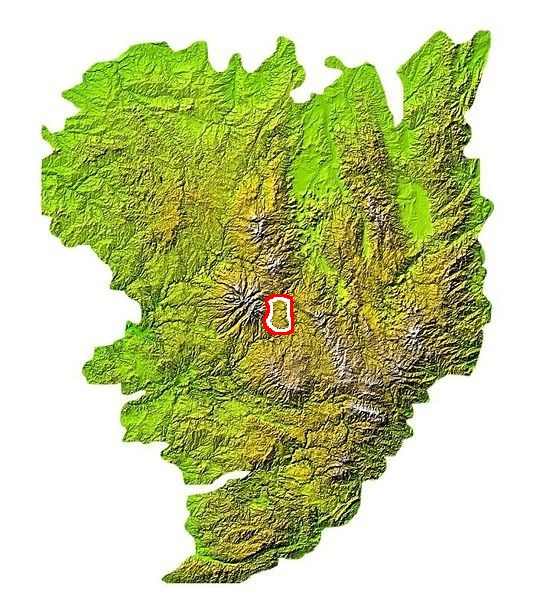
- Location of Planèze of Saint-Flour on the map of the Massif Central
- Country: France
- Region: Auvergne-Rhône-Alpes
- Department: Cantal

Area
  - Total: 410 km^{2} (160 sq mi)

The Planèze of Saint-Flour is a French volcanic plateau, belonging to the Mounts of Cantal. It is a traditional area of the Auvergne region.

Location of Planèze (in purple) in Auvergne region

== Location ==
The basaltic plateau is the eastern part of the Cantal Mountains. It is delimited by the Alagnon, Truyère, Lagnon and Epi.

There is a distinction between the upper Planèze and the lower Planèze. The first one is located at over 1100 metres in altitude and joins practically the summits of the Cantal mountains. It lies to the west of a line passing through the villages of Paulhac, Valuéjols and Ussel.

The true Planèze of Saint-Flour is located to the east of this line. It includes two isolated peaks that rise a few dozen meters, visible to the right when traveling from Saint-Flour to Les Ternes. The first is the Puech de Frayssinet (1,048 meters), which features an ancient castle chapel and a hamlet. The second is the two hills of Tanavelle (1,051 meters and 1,092 meters), one of which hosts a village with its Romanesque church.

== Geology ==
Seven million years ago, the Cantal volcano ended its activity. Gradually, the caldera of the volcano collapsed. A new volcano formed, the caldera filled up, and eventually overflowed. Initially, the lava was very acidic but later became basaltic, spreading in large, fluid flows that covered the slopes of the structure. These flows formed the planèzes.

== Fauna and flora ==
The landscape of the Planèze is characterized by gentle slopes, prompting people to plant numerous groves of pine trees. These groves provide shelter for livestock during inclement weather. They accommodate many birds’ species such as fieldfare, carrion crow, common wood pigeon, common kestrel, long-eared owl, common chaffinch, blue tit, and song thrush.

== History ==
Significant prehistoric settlement in the region is evidenced by the presence of numerous megaliths in Allanche, Joursac, Coltines, Valuéjols, Paulhac, Villedieu, Seriers, and Les Ternes.

Until the city of Saint-Flour was founded in the 11th century on Rocher d'Indiciat, the capital of the Planèze region was Valuéjols, whose name attests to its Gaulish origin. Several Gallo-Roman sites have been discovered, notably a villa at Puech de Frayssinet, which underwent rescue excavations by Alphonse Vinatié in 1980.

The Planèze was a pagus during the Gallo-Roman period and later became a territorium under the Merovingians. During the Carolingian era, it was granted the status of a viguerie.
