= École de Mars =

Revolutionary-era military academy in Paris

- École de Mars
- Plaine des Sablons, Neuilly-sur-Seine (Seine), France
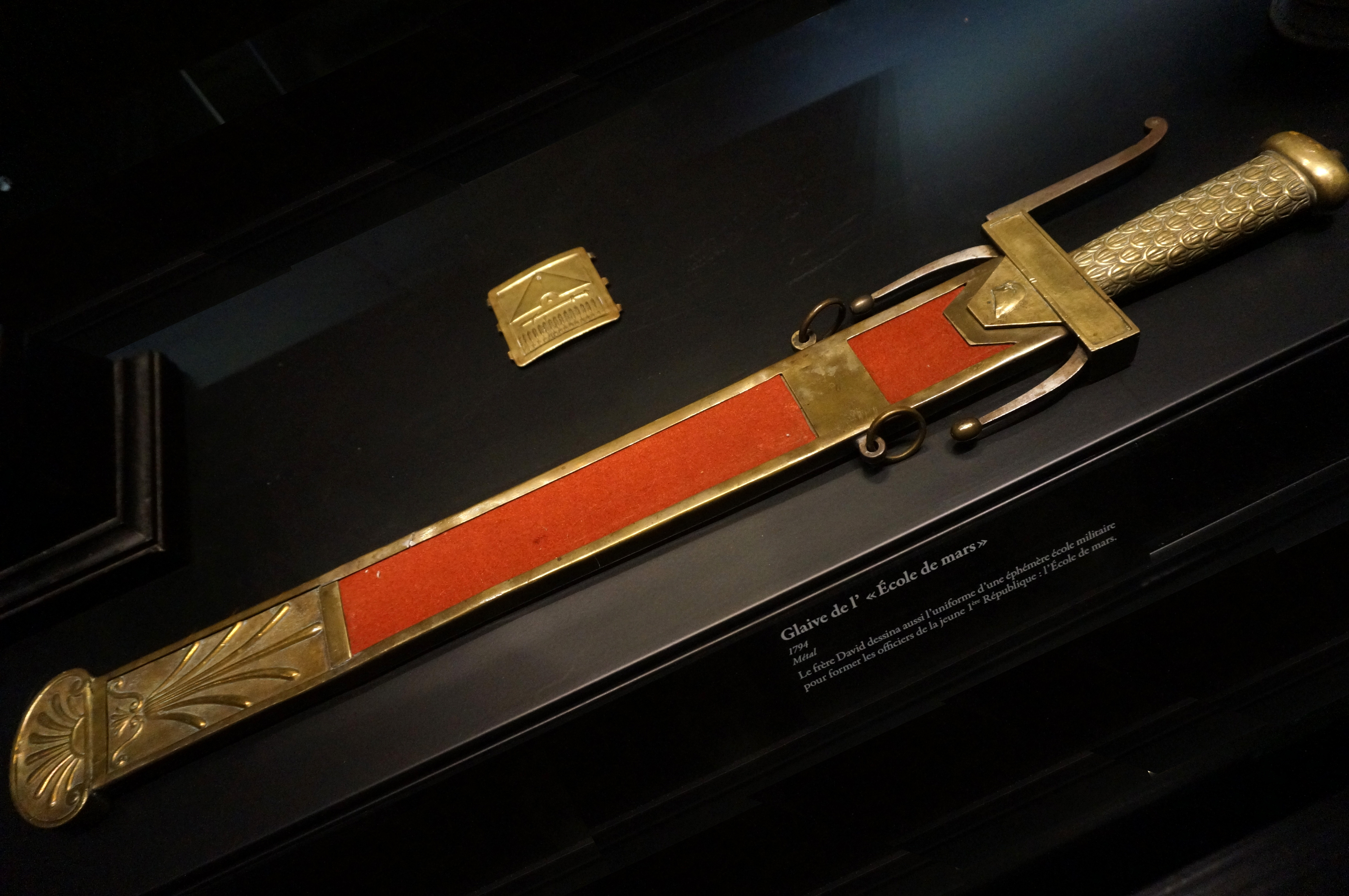
- Sword of the École de Mars, designed by Jacques-Louis David.

Site information
- Type: Military academy and civic school
- Controlled by: French First Republic (National Convention, Committee of Public Safety)

Location
- Coordinates: 48.880468°N 2.2791452°E

Site history
- Built: June 1794
- In use: 1 July 1794 – 23 October 1794
- Battles/wars: French Revolutionary Wars (indirectly, by training cadres)

Garrison information
- Garrison: Students of the École de Mars (approx. 3,500)

The École de Mars (School of Mars) was a French military and civic school established in the final months of the Reign of Terror during the French Revolution. Established by the National Convention on 1 June 1794 (13 Prairial Year II), it was located in the Plaine des Sablons in Neuilly-sur-Seine, near Paris. Its purpose was to provide military training and instill republican values in young men selected primarily from the sons of sans-culottes. Operating for only a few months, the school was shut down in October 1794 following the Thermidorian Reaction.

== History ==
=== Creation ===
On 13 Prairial Year II (1 June 1794), the National Convention decreed the establishment of the École de Mars. The decree stipulated that six youths aged 16 and 17 were to be selected from each district across France, primarily chosen from the sons of sans-culottes. The school's mission, as articulated by leading Montagnard figures such as Robespierre and proponents within the Convention, was to instill republican virtues and military discipline. The aim was to train students "in Fraternity, Discipline, Frugality, Love of the Fatherland, and Hatred of Kings," thereby creating loyal and capable cadres for the French Revolutionary Army.

The decree was rapidly implemented. By early July 1794, approximately 3,468 students had arrived at the camp established for the school. The Committee of Public Safety initially appointed representatives Jean-Pascal Charles de Peyssard and Philippe-François-Joseph Le Bas to administer the school on 14 Prairial (2 June). Following the events of 9 Thermidor (27 July 1794) and Le Bas's suicide, he was replaced by Jacques Brival on 15 Thermidor (2 August). Further administrative changes saw Louis-Bernard Guyton-Morveau appointed on 26 Thermidor (13 August). Later, after a decree renewed the representatives overseeing the camp, Marie-François Moreau and Alexis-Joseph Bouillerot-Demarsenne took over on 28 Fructidor (14 September).

=== Installation at Sablons ===
Construction of the camp began swiftly in late June 1794 on the Plaine des Sablons, an open area near the Porte Maillot gate of Paris (now within Neuilly-sur-Seine). Sheds were erected along the wall of the Bois de Boulogne, complemented by wooden barracks and numerous tents for the students. Kilometres of palisades, painted in the national colors of blue, white, and red, enclosed the grounds. The rapid creation of this large military camp aroused significant curiosity among the residents of Neuilly. However, access was strictly controlled by guards, forcing locals to detour via Les Ternes to reach Paris.

On 13 Messidor Year II (1 July 1794), the selected students began arriving from all regions of France. Many came from artisan or farming backgrounds. Some arrived wearing National Guard uniforms from their home districts, while others arrived in regional attire or improvised outfits.

== Uniform ==
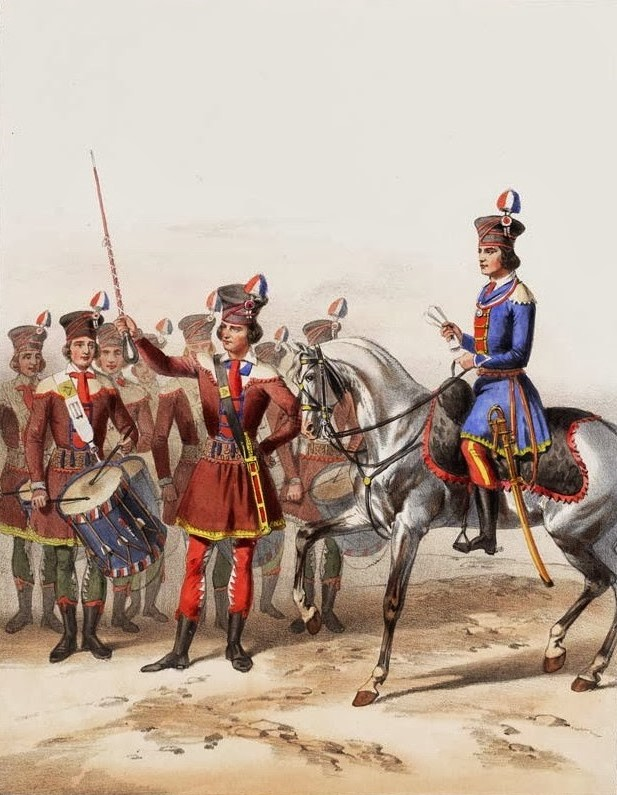
Uniform of the students of the École de Mars, designed by Jacques-Louis David.

Students entered the camp through a gate in the park wall known as the Porte Rouge (Red Gate). Upon arrival, they surrendered their personal belongings and money, for which they received a receipt. They were issued provisional clothing consisting of a police cap, a white canvas smock (sarrau), trousers, and a velvet waistcoat.

Their official uniforms, designed by the renowned revolutionary painter Jacques-Louis David, were highly distinctive and somewhat theatrical, described by contemporaries as a blend of Roman and Scottish styles. The uniform included a tunic ('à la polonaise') featuring swallow-nest epaulettes and decorative brandebourgs, a waistcoat with a shawl collar, a Colin-style neckerchief, tight trousers tucked into black canvas half-gaiters, a plumed shako (a type of military cap), a Roman-style sabre, and a Corsican-style cartridge box. A barber from Neuilly was requisitioned to cut all the students' hair short in the fashionable à la Titus style.

Students were organized into units mimicking the structure of the Roman army: décuries (groups of 10), centuries (groups of 100, formed from 10 décuries), and milleries (groups of 1,000, formed from 10 centuries). Leadership roles within these units rotated among the students, selected by lot each décade (the tenth day of the Republican week).

== Curriculum and life ==
Life at the École de Mars camp was characterized by austerity and rigorous discipline. Students slept in tents. The day began promptly at 5 a.m. with a cannon shot, followed by the sounds of drums and trumpets summoning the students. Military drills commenced immediately and continued until 9 am. Training focused on essential infantry skills, including handling the pike, using the musket (covering maintenance, loading, and firing), and basic artillery practice (such as handling powder and loading cannons).

After a break and a simple snack at 9 am, instruction resumed. Meals were frugal. According to observations by physician Joseph Souberbielle, who treated an epidemic at the camp, the typical daily ration consisted of half a litre of dried beans or fava beans, one and a half pounds of bread, and some pork. Initially, only salted meat was provided, which contributed to a severe dysentery outbreak among the students. Consequently, salted meat was replaced with fresh meat whenever available. On décadi, the menu improved slightly, featuring one pound of beef, cabbage, rice, and potatoes. The only beverage provided was water, often mixed with vinegar or licorice for flavour and supposed health benefits. The evening meal was served at 5 pm, and a final cannon shot at 7:30 p.m. signalled lights out.

Academic instruction was provided in a large tent by several prominent scientists and members of the Convention involved in the school's oversight. Instructors included figures like Claude Louis Berthollet, Antoine-François Fourcroy, Louis-Bernard Guyton-Morveau, Jean Henri Hassenfratz, and Gaspard Monge. Subjects covered practical military knowledge such as fortifications and sapping, alongside elements of physics, chemistry, military justice, and Military administration.

Despite the structured curriculum, significant challenges arose. Many students lacked basic literacy, making theoretical instruction difficult. Furthermore, maintaining order and discipline among several thousand adolescents living in close quarters proved challenging for the administrators.

== Closure ==
The political upheaval following the fall of Robespierre on 9 Thermidor (27 July 1794) directly impacted the École de Mars. Critics, particularly during the ensuing Thermidorian Reaction, alleged that Robespierre and his allies had intended to use the school's students as a loyal paramilitary force or personal guard to consolidate their power in Paris. Following a proposal by Jean-Lambert Tallien, a key figure in the Thermidorian coup, the school's staff underwent a purge, removing individuals perceived as loyal to Robespierre.

The Thermidorian Convention, wary of institutions associated with the previous regime and potentially influenced by the rumours surrounding the school's purpose, ultimately decided to dissolve the École de Mars. A decree ordering its closure was issued on 2 Brumaire Year III (23 October 1794). The students were subsequently dismissed and sent back to their home districts between 3 and 15 Brumaire (24 October – 5 November 1794). The brief existence of the École de Mars thus came to an end after only four months of operation.
