= Patrice Bret (historian) =

French historian of science and technology (born 1949)

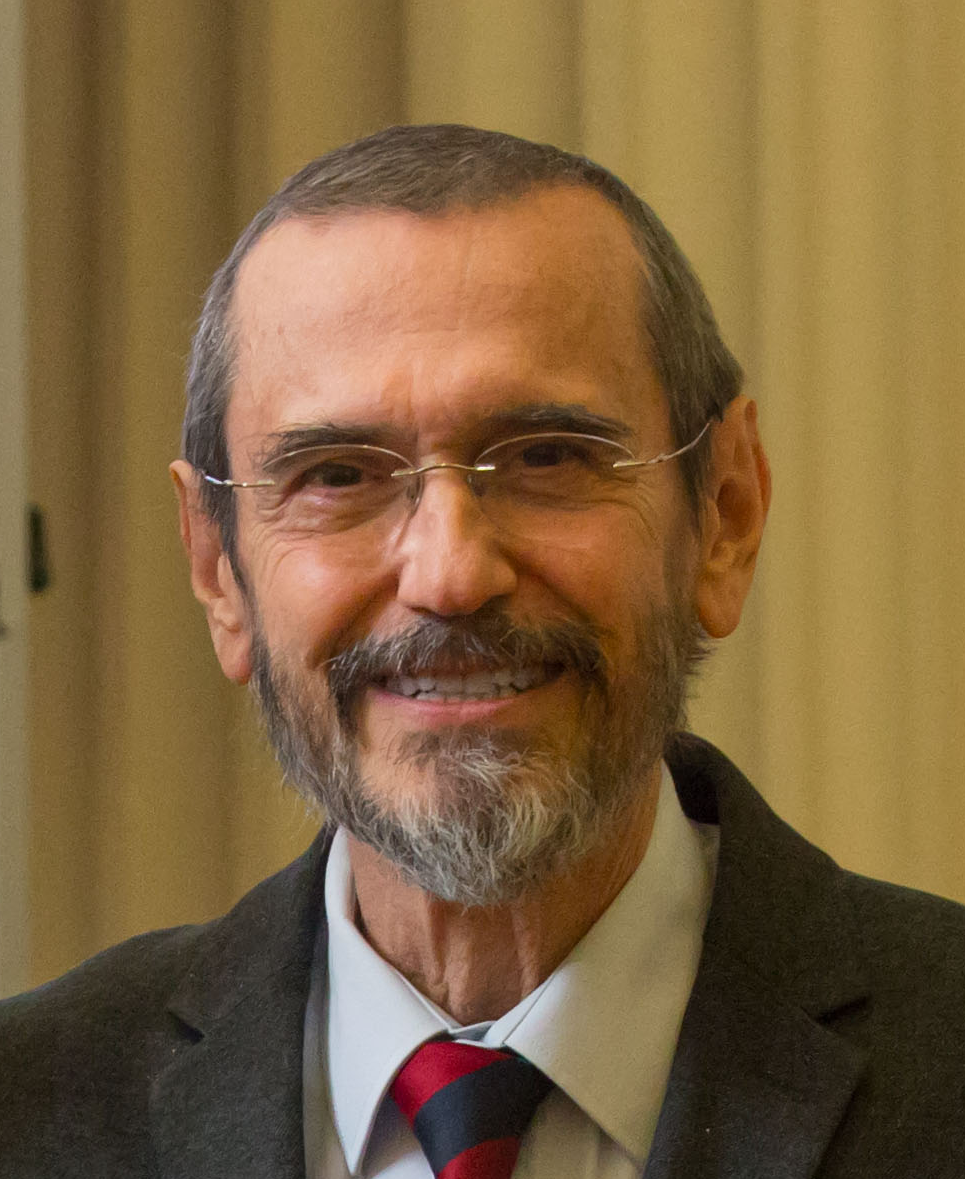
- Born: 1949 (age 76–77)
- Education: University of Provence, Institut d'études politiques d'Aix-en-Provence, Pantheon-Sorbonne University
- Occupations: Historian of science, Centre Alexandre-Koyré

Patrice Bret (born 1949) is a French historian of science and technology and a senior researcher at the Centre Alexandre-Koyré in Paris. His areas of expertise include the translation and circulation of scientific and technical knowledge through communities in the 18th century, the technology and history of armaments in the 18th-20th centuries, and science and technology under colonisation (e.g. Napoleon's Egypt Expedition).

Bret has served as director of research at the Centre national de la recherche scientifique (CNRS), scientific head of the Centre des hautes études de l'Armement (CHEAr), scientific director of the L'Institut de recherche stratégique de l'École militaire (IRSEM), secretary general of the Comité National Francais d'Histoire et de Philosophie des Sciences (CNFHPS), and secretary general of the Comité Lavoisier of the French Academy of Sciences.

== Education ==
Patrice Bret attended the University of Provence, where he received his Bachelor's degree in history (1970) and his Master's degree (1971). He received a Diploma of Political Studies from the Institut d'études politiques d'Aix-en-Provence in 1973. In 1975, he passed the History and Geography CAPES Exam, a competitive teaching examination.

In 1980 he received a Degree in Art History and Archeology from the Pantheon-Sorbonne University. In 1989, he received a Diplôme d'études approfondies (DEA) in history from the Pantheon-Sorbonne University. He also qualified to teach computer science as of 1991. In 1994, he received his Doctorate in History from the Pantheon-Sorbonne University.

== Career ==
From 2003 until his retirement in 2012, Patrice Bret was a research associate in the department of history in the Centre Alexandre-Koyré (UMR 8560) of the Centre de Recherche en Histoire des Sciences et des Techniques (CRHST), a laboratory of the École des hautes études en sciences sociales (EHESS), the Centre national de la recherche scientifique (CNRS) and the National Museum of Natural History in Paris. He also served as director of research at CNRS. Bret continues to be an honorary researcher at the Centre Alexandre-Koyré.

From 2003-2009, he served as scientific head of the Centre des hautes études de l'Armement (CHEAr). CHEAr became part of the Institut des hautes études de défense nationale in the École Militaire as of 2010. From 2009-2012, Bret was the scientific director of L'Institut de recherche stratégique de l'École militaire (IRSEM) of the Institut des hautes études de défense nationale (IHEDN) in the École Militaire.

Bret has been a member of the French National Committee of History and Philosophy of Sciences (Comité National Francais d'Histoire et de Philosophie des Sciences, CNFHPS) since 1996, and served as its Secretary General. He has been a member of the Comité Lavoisier of the French Academy of Sciences since 1987, and served as its Secretary General since 1993. The preservation and publication of Lavoisier's correspondence and physical papers is a major goal of the Comité Lavoisier. Bret has edited volumes VI (1789–1791) and VII (1792–1794) of the correspondence of Antoine-Laurent Lavoisier and is preparing volume VIII (Supplement, 1761–1794) as of 2018.

On 22 May 2018 a research symposium was held in honor of Patrice Bret, at the Alexandre Koyré Center, on the role of science and technology in societies of the 18th and 19th centuries.

== Publications ==
Patrice Bret has published extensively. His books include L'expedition d'Egypte, une enterprise des Lumieres, 1798-1801 (1998), L'État, l'armée, la science. L'invention de la recherche publique en France (1763-1830) (2002), Savants et inventeurs entre la gloire et l’oubli (2014), Madame d'Arconville, 1720-1805 une femme de lettres et de sciences au siècle des Lumières (2011, with Brigitte Van Tiggelen) and Femmes de sciences de l'Antiquité au XIXe siècle réalités et représentations (2014, with Adeline Gargam).

He has edited several volumes of the published correspondence of Antoine Lavoisier. He is particularly interested in the role of translation and women translators in scientific communities. He has been involved in publishing the correspondence of Guyton de Morveau, and is researching translator Claudine Picardet. A Scientific Correspondence during the Chemical Revolution: Louis-Bernard Guyton de Morveau and Richard Kirwan, 1782-1802, has been described as "a splendidly executed work of its sort.

Bret has served on the editorial boards of a number of journals, including Artefact. Techniques, histoire et sciences humaines (Paris, 2012-) and Vulcan. Journal for the Social History of Military Technology (Washington, 2009-).

== Awards ==
- 2018, Franklin-Lavoisier Prize, received by Patrice Bret as general secretary of the Comité Lavoisier on behalf of the Comité Lavoisier, from the Science History Institute and the Fondation de la Maison de la Chimie
- 2007, member, Académie internationale d’histoire des sciences (AIHS)
- 2007, Chevalier dans l’Ordre national des Palmes académiques
- 2002, Médaille Montgolfier, Société d’encouragement pour l’industrie nationale
- 1997, Le Prix Jean-Édouard Goby, Institut de France (Académie des inscriptions et belles-lettres & Académie des sciences morales et politiques)
