= Patrice Bret =

Patrice Bret may refer to:

- Patrice Bret (ski mountaineer) (born 1971), French ski mountaineer
- Patrice Bret (historian) (born 1949), French historian of science and technology
