= List of protected aircraft monuments in France =

A list of protected aircraft monuments in France has national aviation heritage protected sites, known as monument historique.

== History ==
The list of registered monuments is made by the Ministry of Culture.

== Aircraft protected monuments ==
- Nantes, Nantes Atlantique Airport (Aéroport de Nantes-Atlantique), Lockheed L-1049 Super Constellation, registered on 10 December 2004

== See also ==
- Aviation in France
