= Close encounter of Cussac =

1967 reported UFO encounter in Cussac, France

The Close encounter of Cussac refers to claims of an unidentified flying object sighting on 29 August 1967 near Cussac, Cantal, France, by two children who described four small, dark figures near a spherical object while tending cattle. The incident was investigated by civilian researchers and, in 1978, by the French space agency CNES through its Groupe d'Étude des Phénomènes Aérospatiaux Non Identifiés (GEPAN).

== Claims ==
On 29 August 1967, a 13-year-old boy and his 9-year-old sister told adults and gendarmes that they were watching the family's cattle near Cussac when they noticed four small, dark figures and a spherical object beyond a roadside hedge. According to the children, the figures moved toward the sphere, which subsequently ascended and disappeared. The children described the object as reflective or metallic before it became intensely luminous during departure, accompanied by a whistling sound.

== Early investigations ==
The incident received French press coverage shortly after the children's claims. In April 1968, Joël Mesnard and Claude Pavy investigated the case for the civilian Groupe d'Étude des Phénomènes Aériens (GEPA). Their account, published in Phénomènes Spatiaux in June 1968, presented the children's testimony along with drawings and a photograph taken at the site. Mesnard's illustrations depicted the children's claims including two figures, the sphere, and its departure along a spiral trajectory.

== The 1978 GEPAN investigation ==
In April 1978, more than ten years after the reported encounter, investigators from GEPAN, directed by Claude Poher, conducted a retrospective field investigation at Cussac. Their inquiry included interviews with the original claimants and others whose observations they felt were associated, measurements at the site, and attempts to reconstruct the event claimed by the children. Investigators reviewed reports of an unusual odor, but did not establish the odor's chemical composition or origin. GEPAN interpreted the anecdotal claims as indicating the "departure of an occupied vehicle of unknown type".

== Subsequent investigations and interpretations ==
=== Pinvidic and colleagues ===
Between 1983 and 1985, Thierry Pinvidic, Bertrand Méheust, and Jean-Pierre Grangeon undertook a further inquiry, interviewing the witnesses and examining differences between the original and later accounts. They questioned the reliability of some reported details, including the duration of the event, descriptions of the figures, and alleged ground traces, without reaching an agreed definitive explanation. In 1990, Pinvidic published an examination of the case in Communications, in an issue devoted to contemporary rumors and legends. His study addressed the relationship between unusual reported experiences, witness recollections, and the cultural interpretation of UFO narratives.

=== Skeptical reassessments ===
Éric Maillot and other critical investigators explored explanations involving a conventional aircraft, particularly a helicopter, and the possible effects of perception, recollection, and contemporary publicity about other UFO reports. These interpretations differed from GEPAN's assessment of the witnesses' descriptions.

The incident was also discussed in a 2009 article by David Rossoni, Éric Maillot, and Éric Déguillaume in Skeptical Inquirer, published by the Committee for Skeptical Inquiry (formerly CSICOP). The article critically assessed thirty years of official French UFO studies, including methodological and evidentiary questions raised by selected GEPAN cases.

== Publication of the GEPAN report ==
The 1978 GEPAN report was not initially available for general public circulation. A redacted version was made public in March 2005 following efforts by French researcher Grégory Gutierez and with CNES authorization. In 2026, the Sign Oral History Project published an English translation together with the original French document and a historical introduction.

== See also ==
- UFO sightings in France
- Lonnie Zamora incident
