= Canton of Saint-Flour-2 =

Coordinates: 45.033°N 3.092°E

- Canton
- Situation of the canton of Saint-Flour-2 in the department of Cantal
- Country: France
- Region: Auvergne-Rhône-Alpes
- Department: Cantal
- No. of communes: {{{nbcomm}}}
- Population (2023): 9,139
- INSEE code: 1512

The canton of Saint-Flour-2 is an administrative division of the Cantal department, southern France. It was created at the French canton reorganisation which came into effect in March 2015. Its seat is in Saint-Flour.

== Communes ==
The canton consists of the following communes:

1. Brezons
2. Cézens
3. Cussac
4. Gourdièges
5. Lacapelle-Barrès
6. Malbo
7. Narnhac
8. Paulhac
9. Paulhenc
10. Pierrefort
11. Sainte-Marie
12. Saint-Flour (partly)
13. Saint-Martin-sous-Vigouroux
14. Tanavelle
15. Les Ternes
16. Valuéjols
17. Villedieu
