= Sainte-Marie, Cantal =

Commune in Auvergne-Rhône-Alpes, France

Sainte-Marie
- Commune
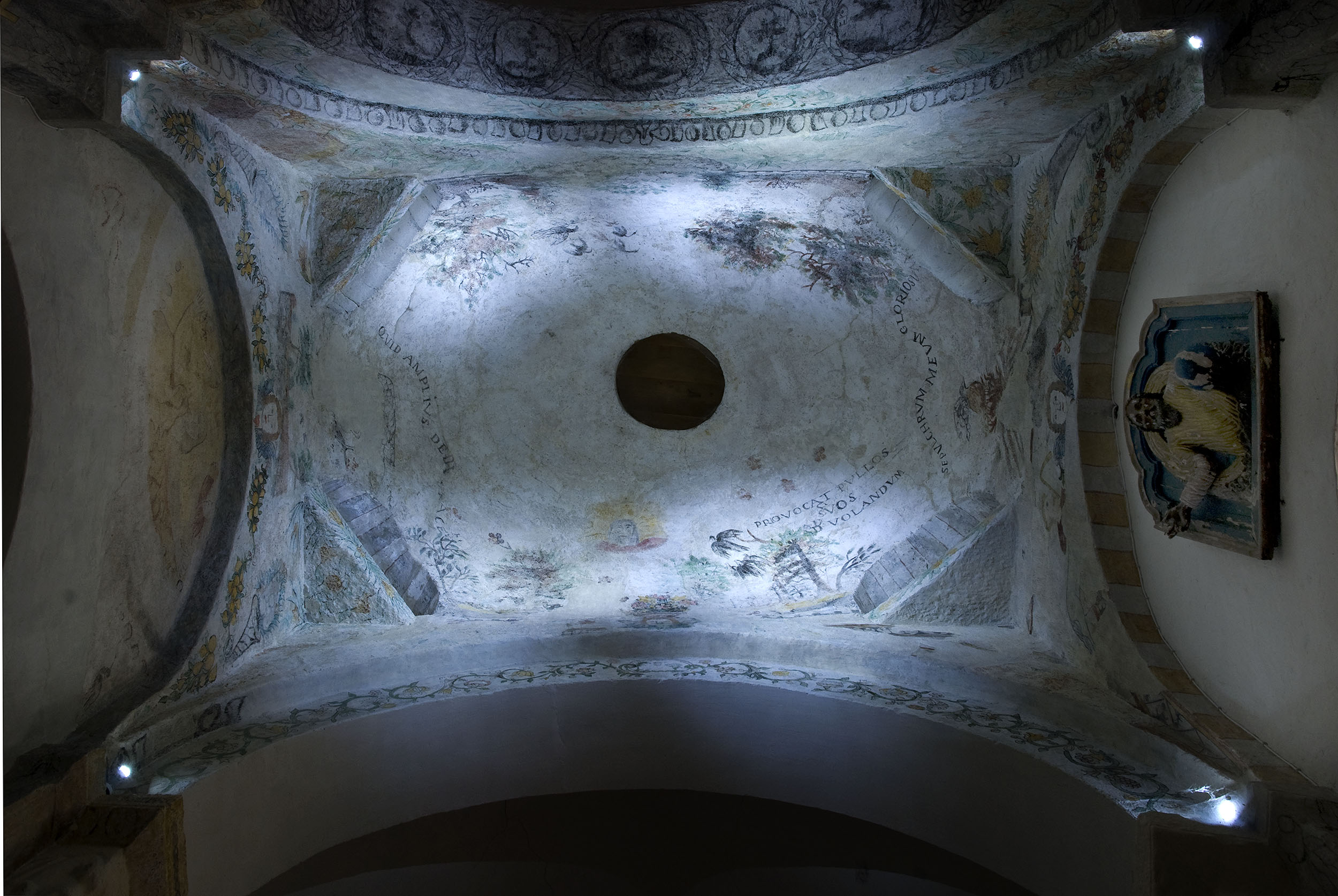
- The interior of the dome of the church of Sainte-Agathe
- Location of Sainte-Marie
- Location within France Location within Auvergne-Rhône-Alpes
- Coordinates: 44°52′42″N 2°53′10″E
- Country: France
- Region: Auvergne-Rhône-Alpes
- Department: Cantal
- Arrondissement: Saint-Flour
- Canton: Saint-Flour-2
- Intercommunality: Saint-Flour Communauté

Government
  - Mayor (2020–2026): Pierre Seguis
- Area^{1}: 17.87 km^{2} (6.90 sq mi)
- Elevation: 840 m (2,760 ft)
- Highest elevation: 1,055 m (3,461 ft)
- Lowest elevation: 620 m (2,030 ft)
- Population (2023): 98
  - Density: 5.5/km^{2} (14/sq mi)
- Time zone: UTC+01:00 (CET)
  - Summer (DST): UTC+02:00 (CEST)
- INSEE/Postal code: 15198 /15230
- ^{1} French Land Register data, which excludes lakes, ponds, glaciers > 1 km^{2} (0.386 sq mi or 247 acres) and river estuaries.

Sainte-Marie (French pronunciation: [sɛ̃t maʁi]; Auvergnat: Senta Mària) is a commune in the Cantal department in south-central France.

== Population ==
Historical population
Year	Pop.	±% p.a.
1968	185	—
1975	152	−2.77%
1982	133	−1.89%
1990	125	−0.77%
1999	107	−1.71%
2007	112	+0.57%
2012	110	−0.36%
2017	108	−0.37%
2023	98	−1.61%
Source: INSEE

== See also ==
- Communes of the Cantal department
