= Cézens =

Commune in Auvergne-Rhône-Alpes, France

- Commune
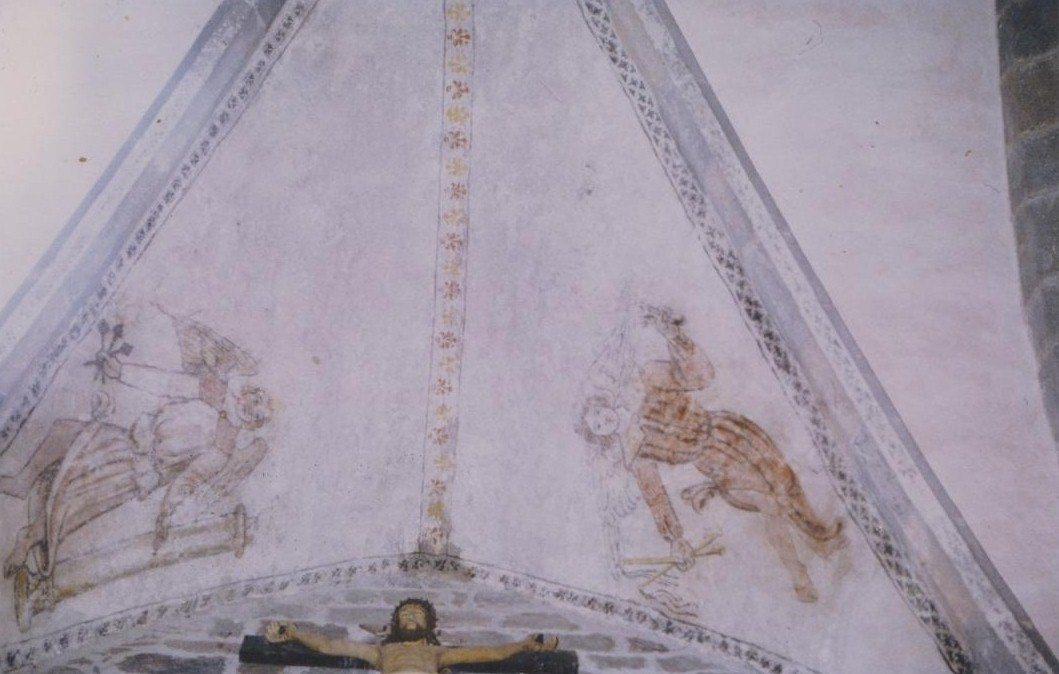
- Murals above the nave of the church of Saint-Germain
- Location of Cézens
- Location within France Location within Auvergne-Rhône-Alpes
- Coordinates: 44°59′05″N 2°51′24″E
- Country: France
- Region: Auvergne-Rhône-Alpes
- Department: Cantal
- Arrondissement: Saint-Flour
- Canton: Saint-Flour-2

Government
  - Mayor (2020–2026): Philippe de Laroche
- Area^{1}: 31.82 km^{2} (12.29 sq mi)
- Elevation: 1,100 m (3,600 ft)
- Highest elevation: 1,476 m (4,843 ft)
- Lowest elevation: 955 m (3,133 ft)
- Population (2023): 218
  - Density: 6.85/km^{2} (17.7/sq mi)
- Time zone: UTC+01:00 (CET)
  - Summer (DST): UTC+02:00 (CEST)
- INSEE/Postal code: 15033 /15230
- ^{1} French Land Register data, which excludes lakes, ponds, glaciers > 1 km^{2} (0.386 sq mi or 247 acres) and river estuaries.

Cézens is a commune in the Cantal department in south-central France.

== Population ==
Historical population
| Year | Pop. | ±% p.a. |
|---|---|---|
| 1968 | 492 | — |
| 1975 | 409 | −2.60% |
| 1982 | 374 | −1.27% |
| 1990 | 332 | −1.48% |
| 1999 | 261 | −2.64% |
| 2007 | 260 | −0.05% |
| 2012 | 225 | −2.85% |
| 2017 | 218 | −0.63% |
| 2023 | 218 | +0.00% |
Source: INSEE

== See also ==
- Communes of the Cantal department
