= Claudine Picardet =

French chemist, mineralogist, meteorologist and translator (1735–1820)

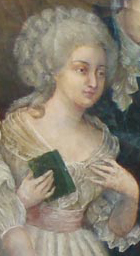
- Portrait detail, believed to be Mme. Picardet
- Born: Claudine Poullet; 7 August 1735; Dijon, France
- Died: 4 October 1820 (aged 85); Paris
- Other name: Claudine Guyton de Morveau
- Spouses: Claude Picardet; Louis-Bernard Guyton de Morveau

Claudine Picardet, born Poullet, later Guyton de Morveau (French: [klodin pikaʁdɛ]; 7 August 1735 – 4 October 1820), was a French chemist, mineralogist, meteorologist and scientific translator. Among the French chemists of the late eighteenth century she stands out for her extensive translations of scientific literature from Swedish, English, German and Italian to French. She translated three books and thousands of pages of scientific papers, which were published as well as circulated in manuscript form. She hosted renowned scientific and literary salons in Dijon and Paris, and was an active participant in the collection of meteorological data. She helped to establish Dijon and Paris as scientific centers, substantially contributing to the spread of scientific knowledge during a critical period in the chemical revolution.

Due to the work of both Claudine Picardet and her second husband Louis-Bernard Guyton de Morveau that Dijon was recognised internationally as a scientific center. As one of the two most prolific translators in chemistry during the 1780s, Madame Picardet increased the availability of chemical knowledge at a crucial time during the chemical revolution, particularly the knowledge of salts and minerals. Her activities supported the publication of specialised scientific journals and helped to establish the use of editorial features such as the date of first publication. The value of her work as a translator was recognized by scholars of her time both nationally and internationally.

== Biography ==
Poullet was born in Dijon and died in Paris. She was the eldest daughter of a royal notary, François Poulet de Champlevey. In 1755, Poullet married Claude Picardet, a barrister. Claude Picardet served as a councillor of the Table de marbre, and later a member of the Académie royale des sciences, arts, et belles-lettres de Dijon. This gave her a broad entrée to scientific, bourgeoisie and high society circles. She attended lectures and demonstrations and became active as a scientist, salonnière, and translator. She published initially as "Mme P*** de Dijon". The couple had one son, who died in 1776, at age 19.

After she became a widow in 1796, she moved to Paris. In 1798 she married Louis-Bernard Guyton de Morveau, a close friend and scientific colleague of many years. Guyton de Morveau served as a deputy in the Council of five hundred and was director and professor of chemistry of the École polytechnique in Paris. She continued her translations and scientific work and hosted an elite scientific salon. During the reign of Napoleon, she was styled Baroness Guyton-Morveau.

“Madame Picardet is as agreeable in conversation as she is learned in the closet; a very pleasing unaffected woman; she has translated Scheele from the German, and a part of Mr. Kirwan from the English; a treasure to M. de Morveau, for she is able and willing to converse with him on chymical subjects, and on any others that tend either to instruct or please.”

Little is known of her between her second husband's death in 1816, and her own in 1820.

== Translation ==
Picardet translated thousands of pages of scientific works, many of them by the leading scientists of the day, from multiple languages, for publication in French. Her work can be seen in the context of a shift in the nature of scientific translation, away from the work of "solitary translators".

Guyton de Morveau headed a group of translators at Dijon Academy, the Bureau de traduction de Dijon, in response to a demand for timely full translations of foreign scientific texts, particularly in the fields of chemistry and mineralogy. Those engaged in this "collective enterprise" needed local and international connections to acquire the original printed works, and linguistic and scientific expertise to develop and validate the accuracy of their translations. In addition to the linguistic work of translation, they carried out laboratory experiments to replicate experimental instructions and confirm the results observed. Mineralogical observations about materiality, such as the colour, odour and shape of crystals, were made to confirm the factual information given in the original text.

The group at Dijon Academy played a "pioneering role" in making the work of foreign scientists available in France. Some translations were published in books and journals. Others were circulated as manuscript copies within scientific and social circles. In addition, experiments were presented at public lectures and demonstrations. Claudine Picardet was the only non-academic among the group, the only woman, and more prolific than any of the half dozen men involved. She was the only translator in the group to work in five languages, and the only one to publish in journals besides the Annales de chimie. The Annales de chimie was established by Guyton de Morveau, Antoine Lavoisier, Claude Louis Berthollet and others beginning in 1789. The rules of the editorial board stated, as of January 1789, that translators were to be paid comparably to authors.

Some later writers, beginning with a "strange obituary" by Claude-Nicolas Amanton, have given Guyton de Morveau and others in the group credit for Picardet's work. Scholar Patrice Bret describes this as a misogynous and "metaphoric tale", contradicted by attributions in the published works and other evidence.

=== Works translated ===
By 1774, at the urging of Guyton de Morveau, Picardet was translating John Hill's Spatogenesia: the Origin and Nature of Spar; Its Qualities and Uses (English, 1772) for publication in Jean-André Mongez's Journal de physique. She became a prominent contributor to Mongez's journal, although her early publications identify her only as Mme. P or "Mme P*** de Dijon". By 1782, Guyton de Morveau's letters indicate that Claudine Picardet had translated works from English, Swedish, German, and Italian into French.

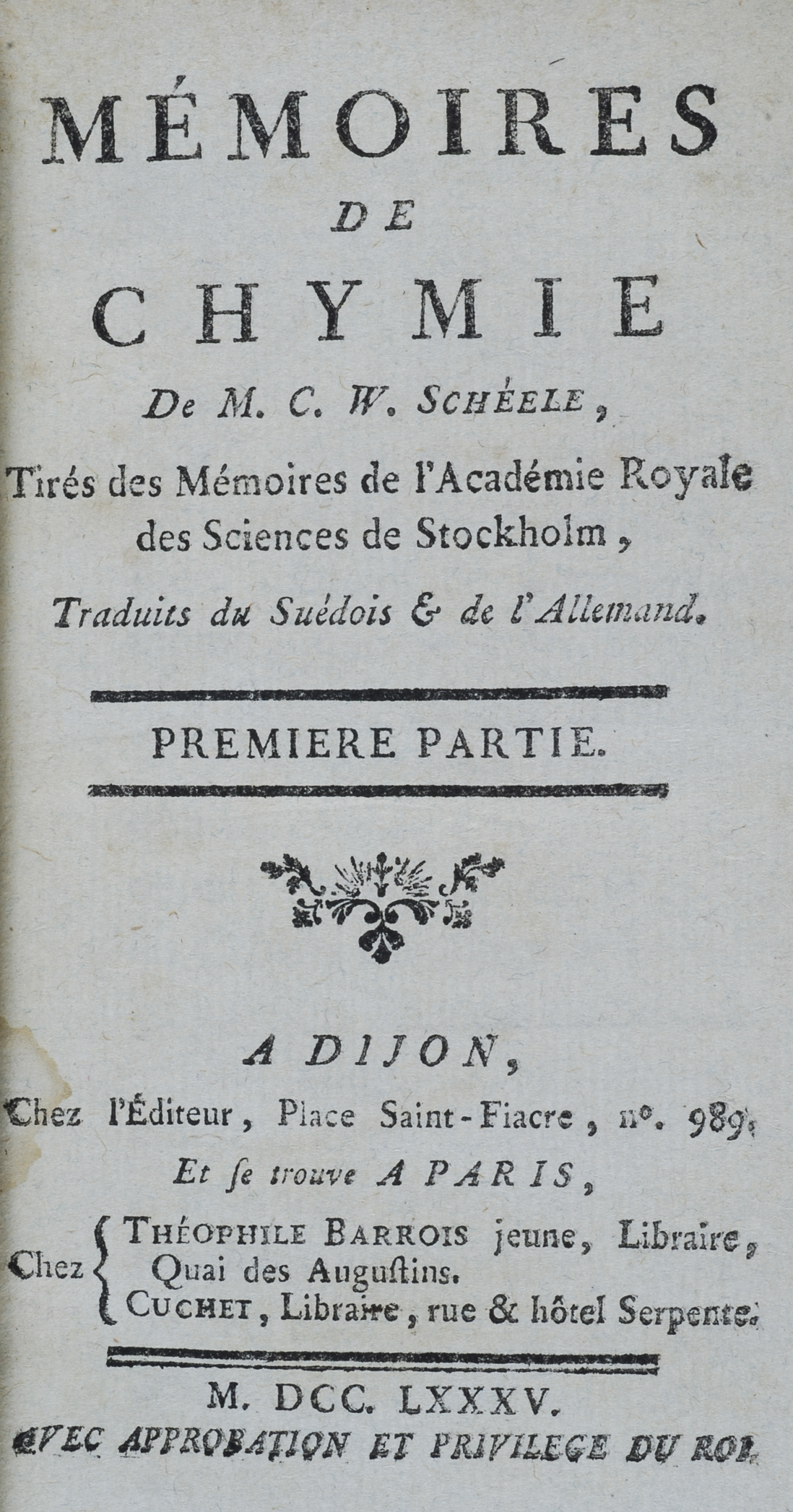
Picardet's translation of Mémoires de chymie de M. C. W. Scheele

Picardet created the first published collection of the chemical essays of Carl Wilhelm Scheele, translated from papers in Swedish and German, as Mémoires de chymie de M. C. W. Scheele, in two volumes (French, 1785). Mme. Picardet is credited with bringing Scheele's work on oxygen to the notice of scientists in France. Picardet was publicly identified as a translator, for the first time, in a review of the book by Jérôme Lalande which appeared in the Journal des savants in July 1786.

Picardet wrote the first translation of Abraham Gottlob Werner's 1774 work Von den äusserlichen Kennzeichen der Fossilien (On the External Characters of Fossils, or of Minerals; Germany, 1774) Werner's major work, it was the first modern textbook on descriptive mineralogy, developing a comprehensive color scheme for the description and classification of minerals. Picardet's translation, Traité des caractères extérieurs des fossiles, traduit de l'allemand de M. A. G. Werner (Treatise on the external characteristics of fossils) was eventually published in Dijon in 1790, 'par le traducteur des "Mémoires de chymie" de Scheele.' Because the original text was substantially expanded and annotated, Picardet's translation is often considered to have constituted a new edition of the work.

In both of these translations, contributions by other authors (such as annotations) are clearly identified.

Chemist and historian of science James R. Partington credits Picardet with the greater part of a French translation of the first two volumes of Torbern Olof Bergman’s six-volume Opuscula physica et chemica (Latin, 1779–1790). Published under the title Opuscules chymiques et physiques de M. T. Bergman (Dijon, 1780–1785), it has been generally credited to Guyton de Morveau. On the basis of letters between Guyton de Morvea and Bergman, Partington suggests that Picardet and others helped to translate Bergman's works without being credited.

Mme. Picardet is variously credited with inspiring and possibly helping to write Madame Lavoisier's translation and critique of Richard Kirwan's 1787 Essay on Phlogiston. She translated some of Kirwan's papers.

Claudine Picardet translated scientific papers from Swedish (Scheele, Bergman), German (Johann Christian Wiegleb, Johann Friedrich Westrumb, Johann Carl Friedrich Meyer, Martin Heinrich Klaproth), English (Richard Kirwan, William Fordyce), Italian (Marsilio Landriani) and possibly Latin (Bergman). Although she most frequently translated works on chemistry and mineralogy, she did translate some meteorological works. These included "Observationes astron. annis 1781, 82, 83 institutæ in observatorio regio Havniensi" (1784), reporting the astronomical observations of the longitude of the Mars knot, made in December 1783 by Thomas Bugge. Picardet's translation was published as "Observations de la longitude du nœud de Mars faite en Décembre 1873, par M. Bugge" in the Journal des savants (1787).

== Scientific work ==
Picardet had attended Morveau's chemistry courses and had studied the minerals in the Dijon Academy's collection. With Guyton de Morveau and other members of the Bureau de traduction de Dijon she carried out chemical experiments and mineralogical observations to confirm the content of the works they were translating. The "Translator's Advertisement" for Werner's treatise on minerals clearly states that she was skilled in laboratory and cabinet observations. She even developed her own terms in French, based on her direct observations of minerals, to capture Werner's neologisms.

Picardet was also active in Antoine Lavoisier’s network for gathering meteorological data. From as early as 1785, she took daily barometric observations with an instrument from the Dijon Academy. M. Picardet sent her results to Lavoisier and they were presented to the Royal Academy of Science in Paris.

== Portrait ==
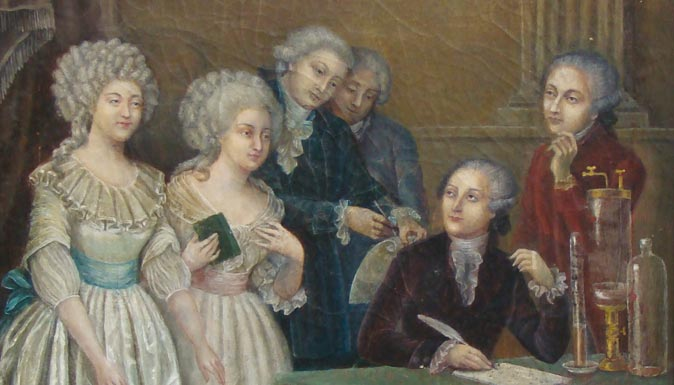
Mme. Lavoisier (left), Claudine Picardet (with book), Berthollet, Fourcroy, Lavoisier (seated) and Guyton de Morveau (right)

As early as 1782, Guyton de Morveau had proposed a systematic approach to chemical nomenclature in which simple substances received simple names indicative of their chemical structure, such as hydrogen and oxygen. Compounds received names indicative of their constituent parts, such as sodium chloride and ferric sulfate. From 1786 to 1787, Guyton de Morveau, Antoine Lavoisier, Claude-Louis Berthollet, and Antoine-François Fourcroy met almost daily, working intensively to write Méthode de nomenclature chimique (“Method of Chemical Nomenclature”), which they intended to be "a complete and definitive reform of names in inorganic chemistry".

A painting of Lavoisier with the co-authors of Méthode de nomenclature chimique is believed to include both Mme. Lavoisier and Mme. Picardet. Mme. Lavoisier stands at the left of the group. The woman next to her is believed to be Mme. Picardet, holding a book emblematic of her work as a translator.

== Honours ==
In 2026, Picardet was announced as one of 72 historical women in STEM whose names have been proposed to be added to the 72 men already celebrated on the Eiffel Tower. The plan was announced by the Mayor of Paris, Anne Hidalgo following the recommendations of a committee led by Isabelle Vauglin of Femmes et Sciences and Jean-François Martins, representing the operating company which runs the Eiffel Tower.

== See also ==
- Timeline of women in science
