= Saint-Martin-sous-Vigouroux =

Commune in Auvergne-Rhône-Alpes, France

- Commune
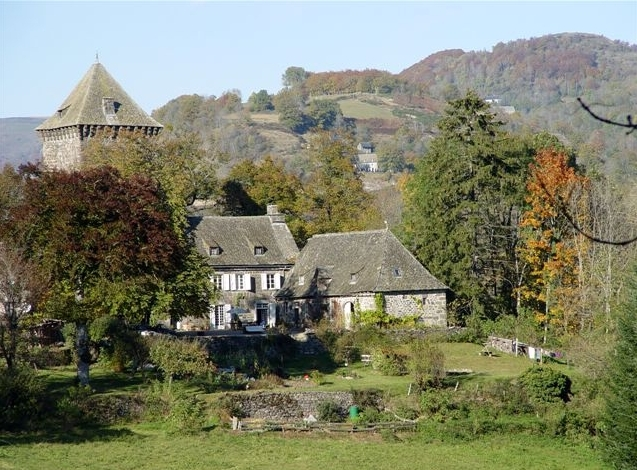
- Chateau Lescure

- Coat of arms
- Location of Saint-Martin-sous-Vigouroux
- Location within France Location within Auvergne-Rhône-Alpes
- Coordinates: 44°55′26″N 2°48′13″E
- Country: France
- Region: Auvergne-Rhône-Alpes
- Department: Cantal
- Arrondissement: Saint-Flour
- Canton: Saint-Flour-2
- Intercommunality: Saint-Flour Communauté

Government
  - Mayor (2020–2026): Sophie Bénézit
- Area^{1}: 19.29 km^{2} (7.45 sq mi)
- Elevation: 742 m (2,434 ft)
- Highest elevation: 1,371 m (4,498 ft)
- Lowest elevation: 670 m (2,200 ft)
- Population (2023): 217
  - Density: 11.2/km^{2} (29.1/sq mi)
- Time zone: UTC+01:00 (CET)
  - Summer (DST): UTC+02:00 (CEST)
- INSEE/Postal code: 15201 /15230
- ^{1} French Land Register data, which excludes lakes, ponds, glaciers > 1 km^{2} (0.386 sq mi or 247 acres) and river estuaries.

Saint-Martin-sous-Vigouroux (French pronunciation: [sɛ̃ maʁtɛ̃ su viɡuʁu]; Auvergnat: Sant Martin jos Vigron) is a commune in the Cantal department in south-central France.

It is located at the southern tip of the 'Parc naturel régional des Volcans d'Auvergne' (Auvergne regional natural park).

== Population ==
Historical population
Year	Pop.	±% p.a.
1968	418	—
1975	410	−0.28%
1982	382	−1.01%
1990	357	−0.84%
1999	279	−2.70%
2007	266	−0.59%
2012	248	−1.39%
2017	236	−0.99%
2023	217	−1.39%
Source: INSEE

== See also ==
- Communes of the Cantal department
