= Louis-Bernard Guyton de Morveau =

French chemist (1737–1816)

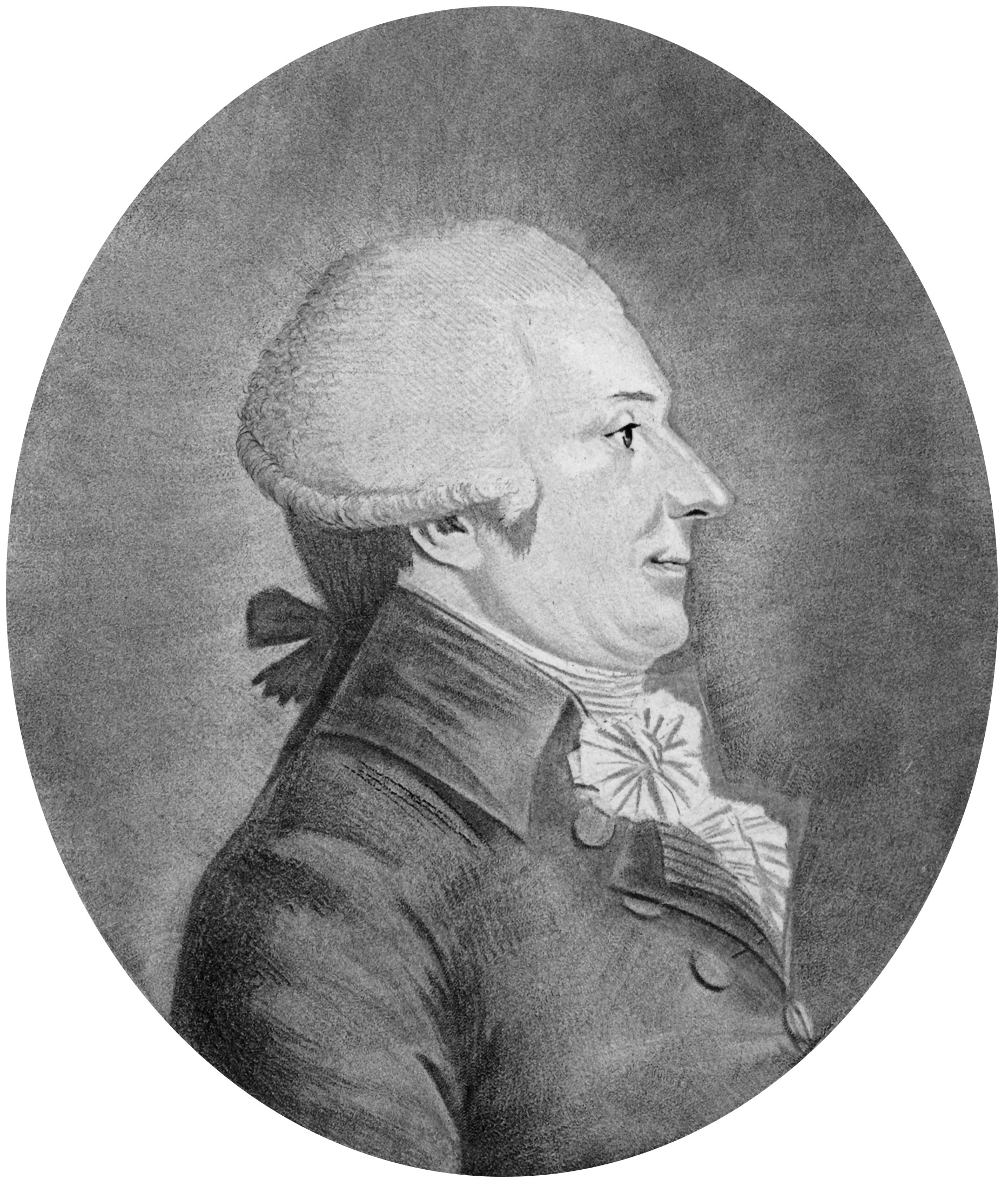
- Louis-Bernard Guyton de Morveau
- Born: 4 January 1737; Dijon, France
- Died: 2 January 1816 (aged 78); Paris, France
- Known for: chemical nomenclature
- Spouse: Claudine Picardet
- Scientific career
- Fields: chemistry

Louis-Bernard Guyton, Baron de Morveau (also Louis-Bernard Guyton-Morveau after the French Revolution; 4 January 1737 – 2 January 1816) was a French chemist, politician, and aeronaut. He is credited with producing the first systematic method of chemical nomenclature.

== Early career ==
Guyton de Morveau was born on 4 January 1737 in Dijon, where he served as a lawyer, then avocat général, of the Dijon parlement.

In 1773, already interested in chemistry, he proposed use of "muriatic acid gas" for fumigation of buildings and as a result is sometimes given credit for having suggested chlorine in this use. However, chlorine was not well characterized at that time, and hydrogen chloride (made by reacting sodium chloride and sulfuric acid) was actually the active gaseous fumigation agent.

He was criticized by Jean Pierre Chardenon who told him that he should rest in his literary achievements and stay away from chemistry. This challenge led to his resigning his post in 1782 to dedicate himself to chemistry, collaborating on the Encyclopédie Méthodique and working for industrial applications. He performed various useful services in this role, and founded La Société des Mines et Verreries in Saint-Bérain-sur-Dheune.

In 1783, he was elected a foreign member of the Royal Swedish Academy of Sciences, and in 1788 a Fellow of the Royal Society. (Note: Smeaton 118)

== Revolution ==
During the Revolution, Guyton de Morveau (then styled Guyton-Morveau) served as Procureur général syndic of the Côte-d'Or département in 1790. He was elected a deputy to the Legislative Assembly in August 1791 and served as the president of the Legislative Assembly from 4 to 18 March 1792, early in the Girondin ministry. (Note: Smeaton 122) After the Girondins were dismissed in June 1792, he was elected to the National Convention and served in the Commission of Twelve (French: Commission des Douze), which advised the Assembly on how to handle events following the declaration of war against Austria on 20 April of that year.

He voted with the left wing, including a vote in favor of the execution of King Louis XVI, (Note: Smeaton 126) but according to one historical account, "he does not seem to have become a member of the Jacobin Club". Guyton de Morveau served on the Committee of Public Safety from 6 April 1793 to 10 July 1793, when he resigned in order to devote his time to the French Revolutionary Army, working to perfect the manufacture of gunpowder and saltpeter for firearms. He invented a new type of cannonball which utilized a ring of lead to improve its firing range, analyzed and tested foreign gunpowder samples, and helped teach men how to manufacture gunpowder. (Note: Smeaton 124) He also formed a corp of balloonists. He himself flew in a balloon during the battle of Fleurus on 26 June 1794, and assisted in several other battles.

Guyton de Morveau re-entered the Committee of Public Safety on 6 October 1794, two months after the overthrow of Robespierre, then left again on 3 February 1795.

== Later life and death ==
Guyton de Morveau published his first essay on a new chemical nomenclature in 1782, and actively debated with contemporary chemists to defend his new system. He joined and became a proponent of the Lavoisierian school of chemistry, which held that the old Phlogiston theory was incorrect. He, together with Antoine Lavoisier, Claude Louis Berthollet, and Antoine-François de Fourcroy, published the Méthode de nomenclature chimique, which effectively established the modern standardized chemical nomenclature that is still in use in the 21st century.

He was among the founders of the École polytechnique and the École de Mars, and was a professor of mineralogy at the Polytechnique (as well as its director in 1797). He became a first-class member of the Académie des sciences in chemistry on 20 November 1795, and subsequently elected vice-president of the class (1806) and then president (1807). In 1798 he married Claudine Picardet, a recently widowed friend and colleague. (Note: Smeaton 120) Under the Directory, he served on the Council of Five Hundred from 1797, elected from Ille-et-Vilaine, and was Treasury administrator of the Consulate in 1799.

In 1801 he wrote Traité des moyens de désinfecter l'air, which described methods of disinfection using vapors of hydrochloric acid and chlorine, (Note: Smeaton 125) based on his successful use of the methods at Dijon in 1773. In 1802 he heard that James Carmichael Smyth had received a £5000 award from the British Parliament for proving that mineral acids such as nitric acid vapor were effective disinfectants, and applied for an award for himself, claiming that he discovered the method first. He was not successful, but some British scientists, such as Richard Kirwan and Thomas Beddoes, expressed agreement with him.

He remained an active editor of Annales de chimie until his death.

Guyton de Morveau died in Paris on 2 January 1816. Smeaton says the following about his death:

In normal times a man of his eminence would have been commemorated by a long éloge, published by the Institut. but this honour could not be accorded early in the Restoration to one who had voted for the death of Louis XVI, and there was only a short funeral oration by Berthollet, who praised his scientific work but did not mention his services to the State.

== Works ==
Besides being a diligent contributor to the scientific periodicals of the day, Guyton wrote Mémoire sur l'éducation publique (1762); a satirical poem entitled Le Rat iconoclaste, ou le Jésuite croqué (1763); Discours publics et éloges (1775–1782); Plaidoyers sur plusieurs questions de droit (1785); and Traité des moyens de désinfecter l'air (1801). With Hugues Maret (1726–1785) and Jean François Durande (d. 1794) he also published the Élémens de chymie théorique et pratique (1776–1777).

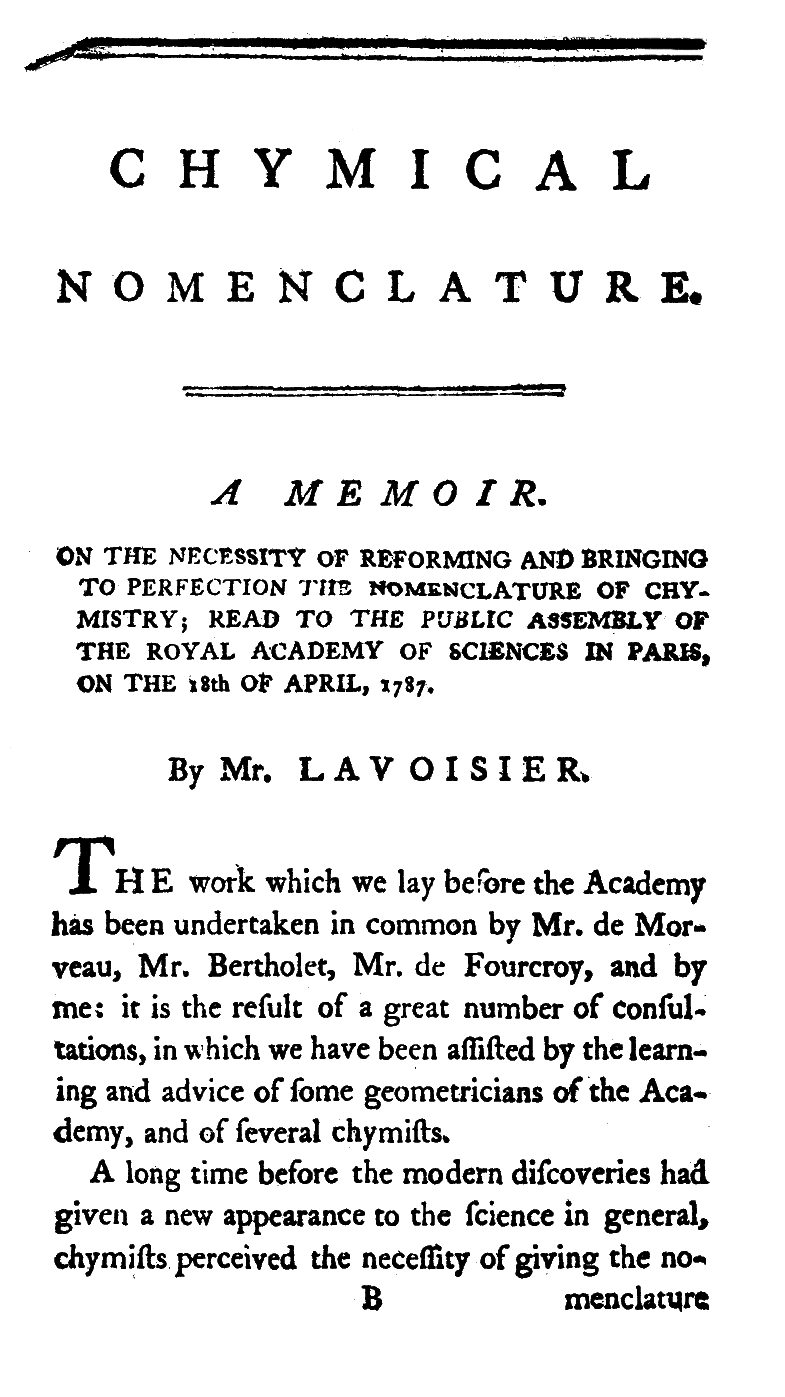
First page of Lavoisier's Chymical Nomenclature

Airship flown by Louis-Bernard Guyton de Morveau, 1784

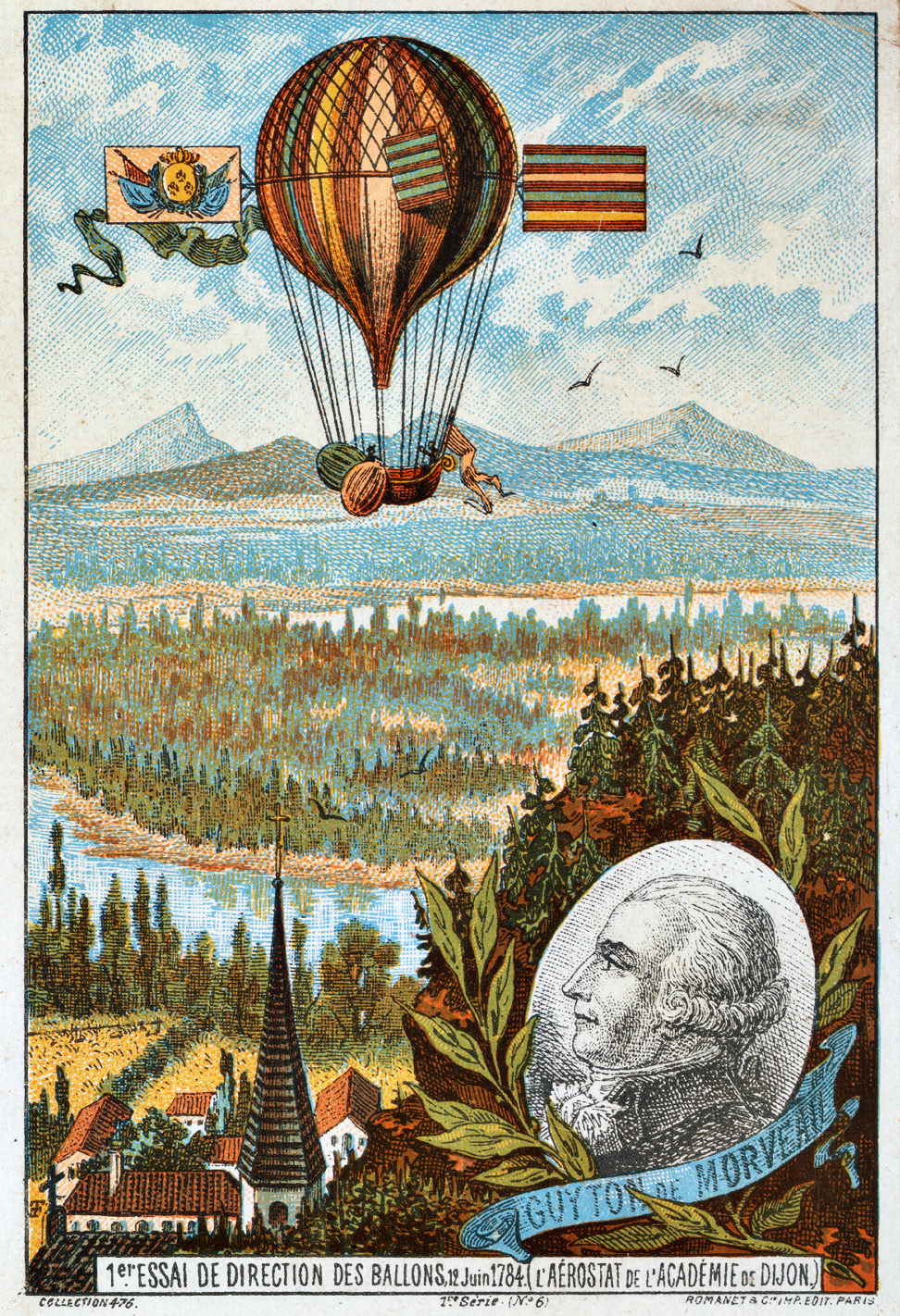
First flight with a dirigible balloon, 12 June 1784.

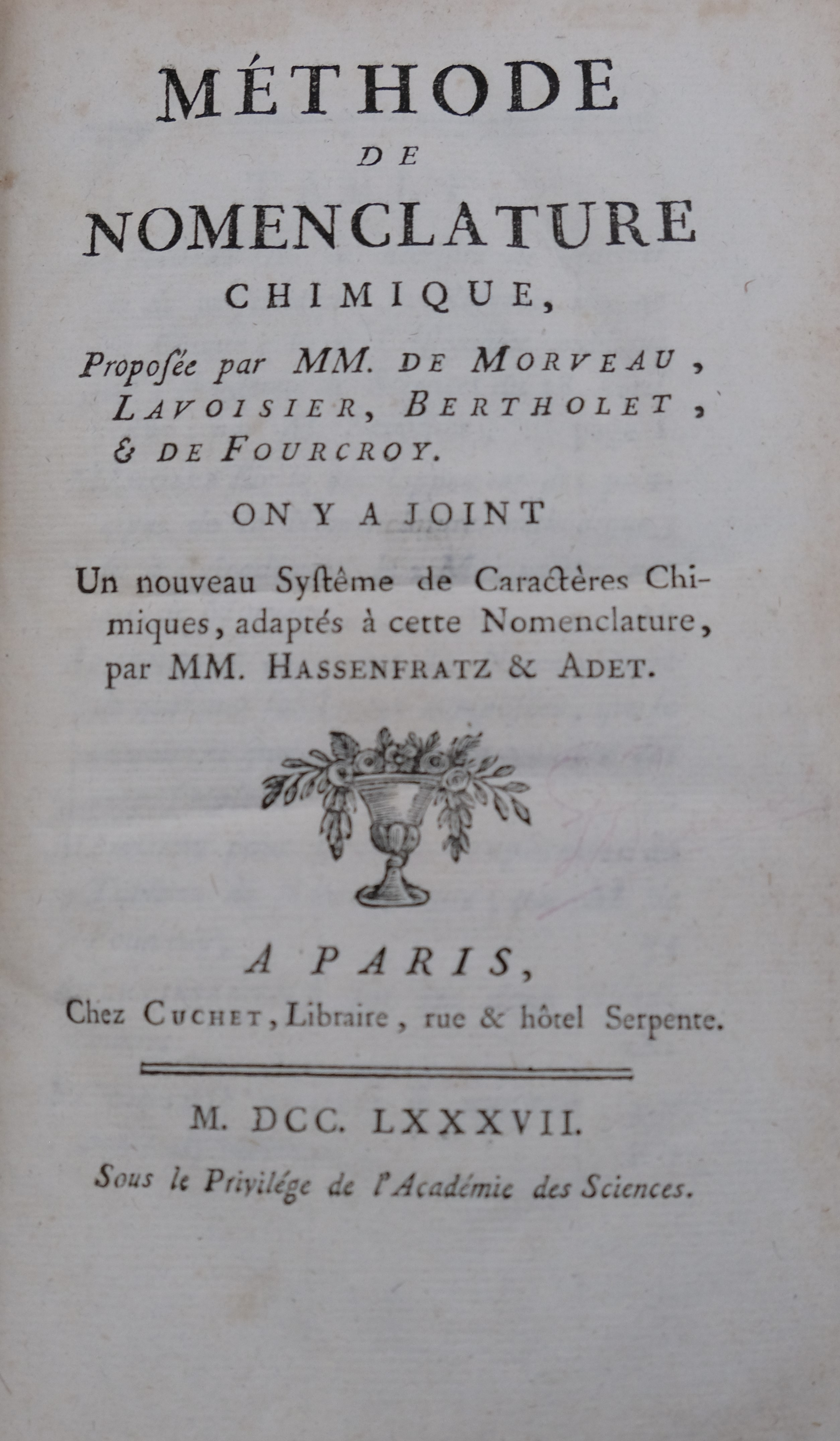
1787 copy of "Méthode de Nomenclature Chimique," featuring work by Morveau

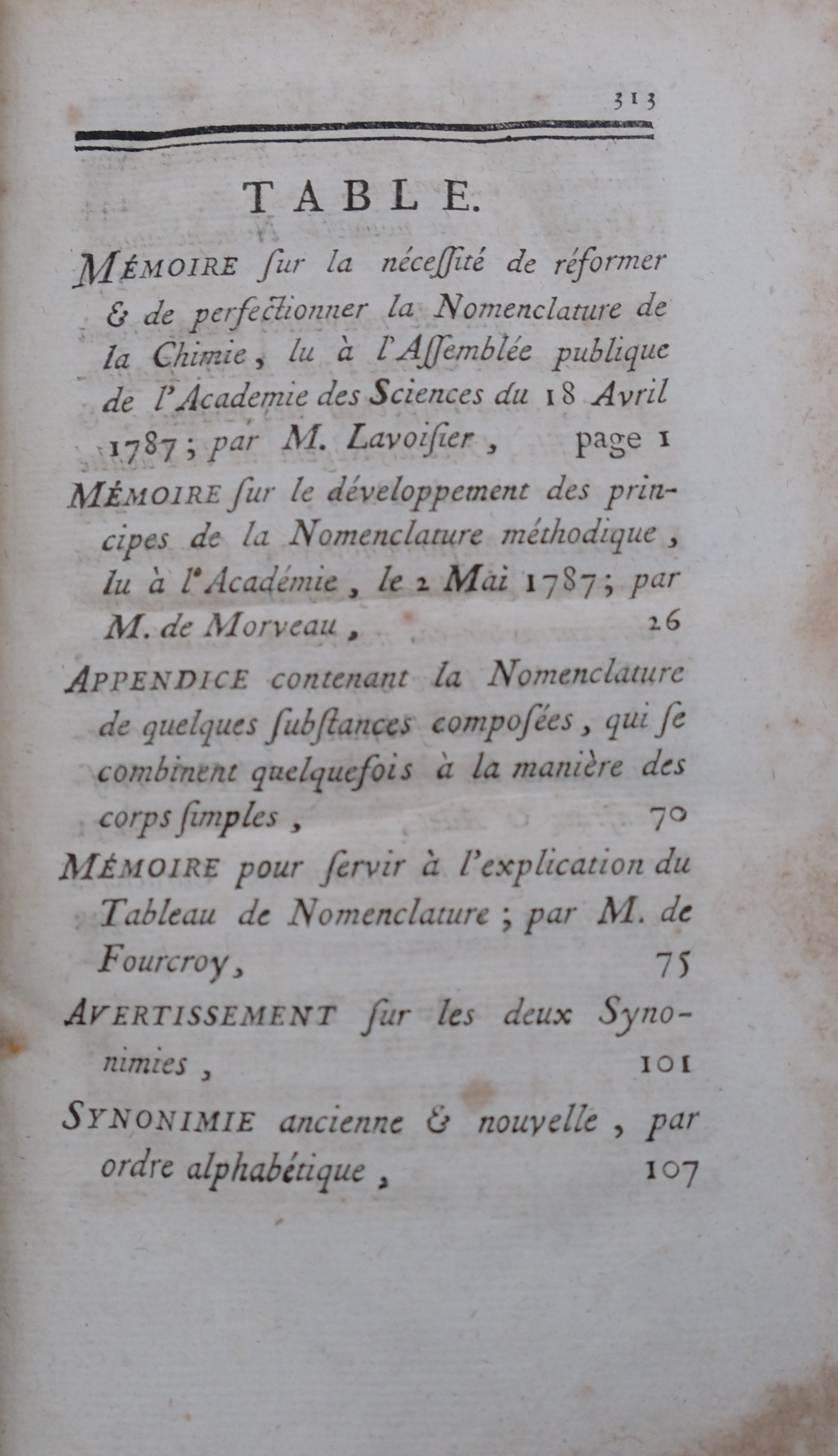
1787 copy of "Méthode de Nomenclature Chimique," featuring work by Morveau

== Awards and honors ==
During his lifetime, Guyton de Morveau received the cross of the Legion of Honour (1803) and was made an Officer of the Legion of Honour for service to humanity (1805). He was made a baron of the First French Empire in 1811.

Méthode de Nomenclature Chimique was honored by a Citation for Chemical Breakthrough Award from the Division of History of Chemistry of the American Chemical Society, presented at the Académie des Sciences (Paris) in 2015.

== See also ==
- Arthur Young (agriculturist)
- Aviation in France
- History of aviation
- History of chemistry
- History of weapons
- Timeline of the French Revolution

== Footnotes ==
=== Sources ===
- Smeaton, W. A. (1967). "Louis Bernard Guyton de Morveau, F.R.S. (1737-1816) and His Relations with British Scientists". Notes and Records of the Royal Society of London. 22 (1/2). ISSN 0035-9149 – via JSTOR.
