= UFO sightings in Belgium =

This is a list of alleged sightings of unidentified flying objects or UFOs in Belgium.

== 1989-1990 ==
- A series of large triangular UFOs was reported in the skies of Belgium between 1989 and 1990. One notable incident took place on 30 March 1990, wherein a mass sighting of at least one silent, low-flying black triangle was tracked by multiple NATO radar and jet interceptors. The Belgian military was under the initial assumption that it was a secret aircraft operated by the American military. There was also a question as to whether it was the then-recently-declassified F-117 using Belgian airspace as a flight path, but Fmr. Belgian Defence Minister Leo Delcroix later deemed this identification unlikely. One notable piece of photographic evidence exists; however, someone came forward 21 years after the incident and claimed to have perpetrated a photographic hoax.

== See also ==
- UFO sightings in France
- List of reported UFO sightings
