= Annette Lykknes =

Norwegian chemist and historian

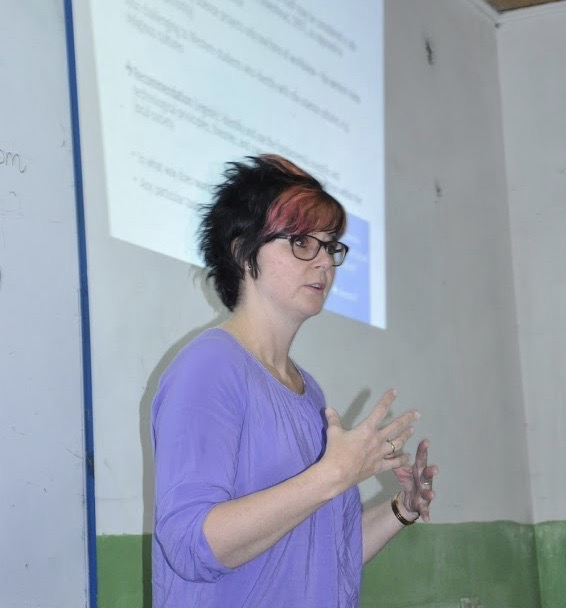
- Born: 31 October 1974
- Awards: 2026 Joseph B. Lambert HIST Award

Academic background
- Education: Norwegian University of Science and Technology

Annette Lykknes is a Norwegian chemist and historian, and is a full professor at the Norwegian University of Science and Technology. She publishes on the history of chemistry, particularly the history of the periodic table, and women's roles in chemical discoveries. Lykknes is Chair of the Division of History of Chemistry of the European Chemical Society.

== Academic career ==
Lykknes trained as a teacher and taught at high school. She completed an MSc in chemistry and chemistry education in 1998, followed by a PhD on Norwegian radiochemist Ellen Gleditsch at the Norwegian University of Science and Technology in 2005. Lykknes then joined the faculty of the university, where she is professor of chemistry education.

Lykknes is Chair of the Division of History of Chemistry of the European Chemical Society, a position she has held since 2021, and was vice-chair from 2011. She is a delegate of the Norwegian Chemical Society. Lykknes is also a member of the Commission on the History of Women in Science, Technology, and Medicine of the International Union for the History of Science, Technology and Medicine. She is the topical editor for History of Chemistry for the Springer-published ChemTexts: The Textbook Journal of Chemistry. She has contributed articles on the periodic table and mass action law to the Store Norske Leksikon, and is subject manager for articles in the categories History of Chemistry, Chemists, and the Periodic Table. In 2022, she was guest editor of a special issue of Ambix, on women scientists, along with Elena Serrano and Joris Mercelis.

With Brigitte Van Tiggelen, Lykknes co-edited the book Women in their Element: Selected Women's Contributions to the Periodic System, which was published by World Scientific in 2019. The book includes biographies of thirty-eight women who contributed to the discovery of elements, with a particular focus on scientific collaborations. Lykknes also co-wrote Periodesystemet: Fra alkymi til kjernekjemi [The Periodic Table From alchemy to nuclear chemistry], commissioned by the Norwegian Cultural Council, which was shortlisted for the Norwegian University of Science and Technology Literature Award in 2020. A volume containing didactic materials about chemical histories titled Discovering the Elements: No Simple Stories and edited by Lykknes and Van Tiggelen is due to be published in November 2025.

== Selected publications ==
- Brigitte Van Tiggelen; Lykknes, Annette (2019). "Celebrate the women behind the periodic table". Nature. 565 (7741): 559–561. doi:10.1038/d41586-019-00287-7. PMID 30692662. Wikidata Q91259803.
- Lykknes, Annette (2020). "The Chemistry Professor as Consultant at the Norwegian Institute of Technology, 1910-1930". Ambix: 271–288. doi:10.1080/00026980.2020.1794697. PMID 32698703. Wikidata Q97651727.
- Palmer, Helen; Efstathiou, Sophia; Lykknes, Annette (10 October 2024). "Towards more culturally aware teaching of 'scientific practices': Understanding science as a social-historical human endeavour". Nordic Studies in Science Education. 20 (2): 229–246. doi:10.5617/nordina.10001. hdl:11250/3158571. ISSN 1894-1257.
- Elena Serrano; Mercelis, Joris; Lykknes, Annette (2022). ""I am not a Lady, I am a Scientist." Chemistry, Women, and Gender in the Enlightenment and the Era of Professional Science". Ambix. 69 (3): 203–220. doi:10.1080/00026980.2022.2100954. PMID 35916028. Wikidata Q135006019.
