= Brezons =

Commune in Auvergne-Rhône-Alpes, France

- Commune
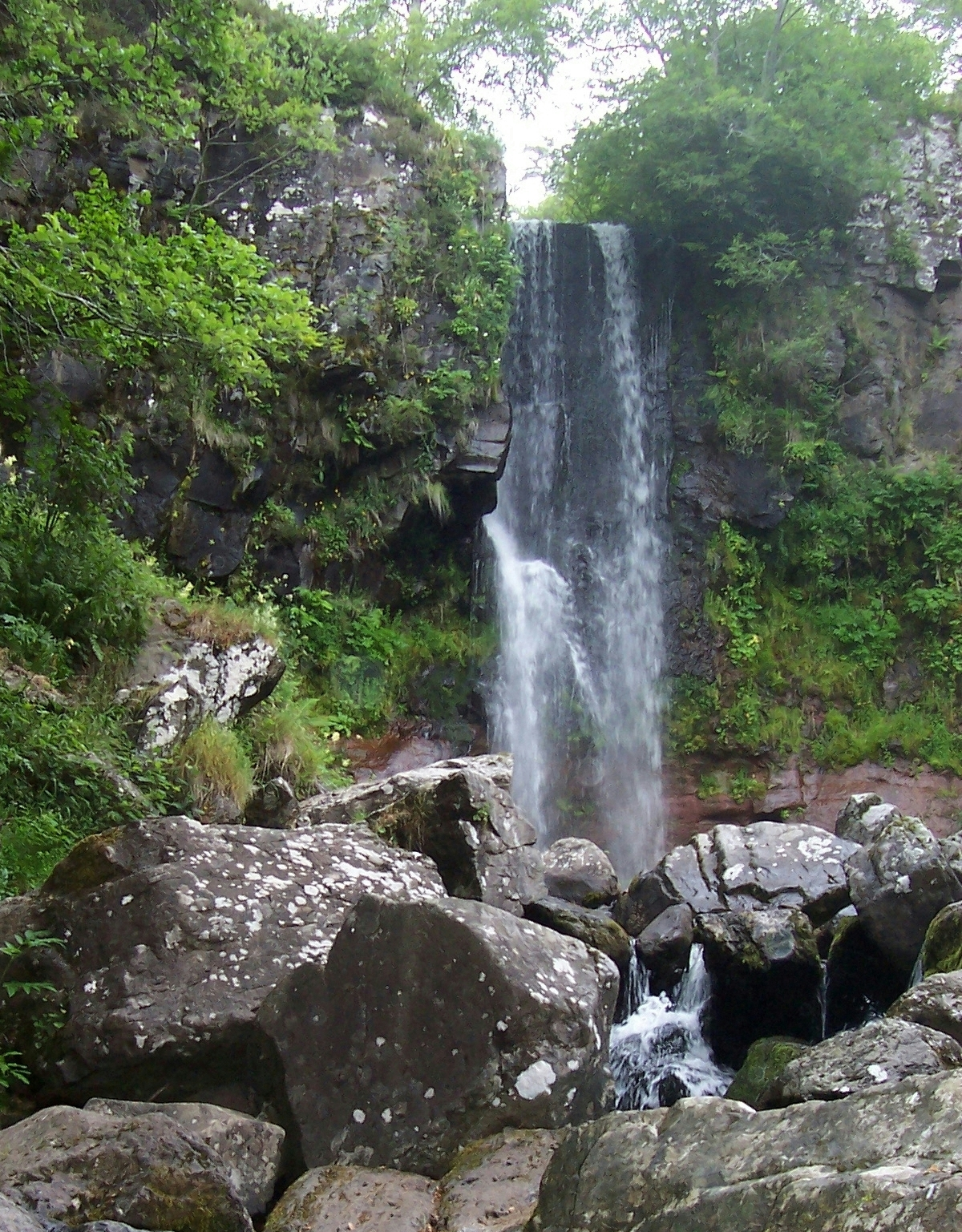
- Saut de la truite waterfall
- Location of Brezons
- Location within France Location within Auvergne-Rhône-Alpes
- Coordinates: 44°58′09″N 2°48′29″E
- Country: France
- Region: Auvergne-Rhône-Alpes
- Department: Cantal
- Arrondissement: Saint-Flour
- Canton: Saint-Flour-2

Government
  - Mayor (2020–2026): Olivia Gueroult
- Area^{1}: 43.2 km^{2} (16.7 sq mi)
- Elevation: 820 m (2,690 ft)
- Highest elevation: 1,813 m (5,948 ft)
- Lowest elevation: 785 m (2,575 ft)
- Population (2023): 177
  - Density: 4.10/km^{2} (10.6/sq mi)
- Time zone: UTC+01:00 (CET)
  - Summer (DST): UTC+02:00 (CEST)
- INSEE/Postal code: 15026 /15230
- ^{1} French Land Register data, which excludes lakes, ponds, glaciers > 1 km^{2} (0.386 sq mi or 247 acres) and river estuaries.

Brezons (French pronunciation: [bʁəzɔ̃]; Occitan: Breson) is a commune in the south-central French department of Cantal.

== Population ==
Historical population
Year	Pop.	±% p.a.
1968	451	—
1975	350	−3.56%
1982	310	−1.72%
1990	252	−2.56%
1999	208	−2.11%
2007	215	+0.41%
2012	197	−1.73%
2017	183	−1.46%
2023	177	−0.55%
Source: INSEE

== See also ==
- Communes of the Cantal department
