= Lacapelle-Barrès =

Commune in Auvergne-Rhône-Alpes, France

- Commune
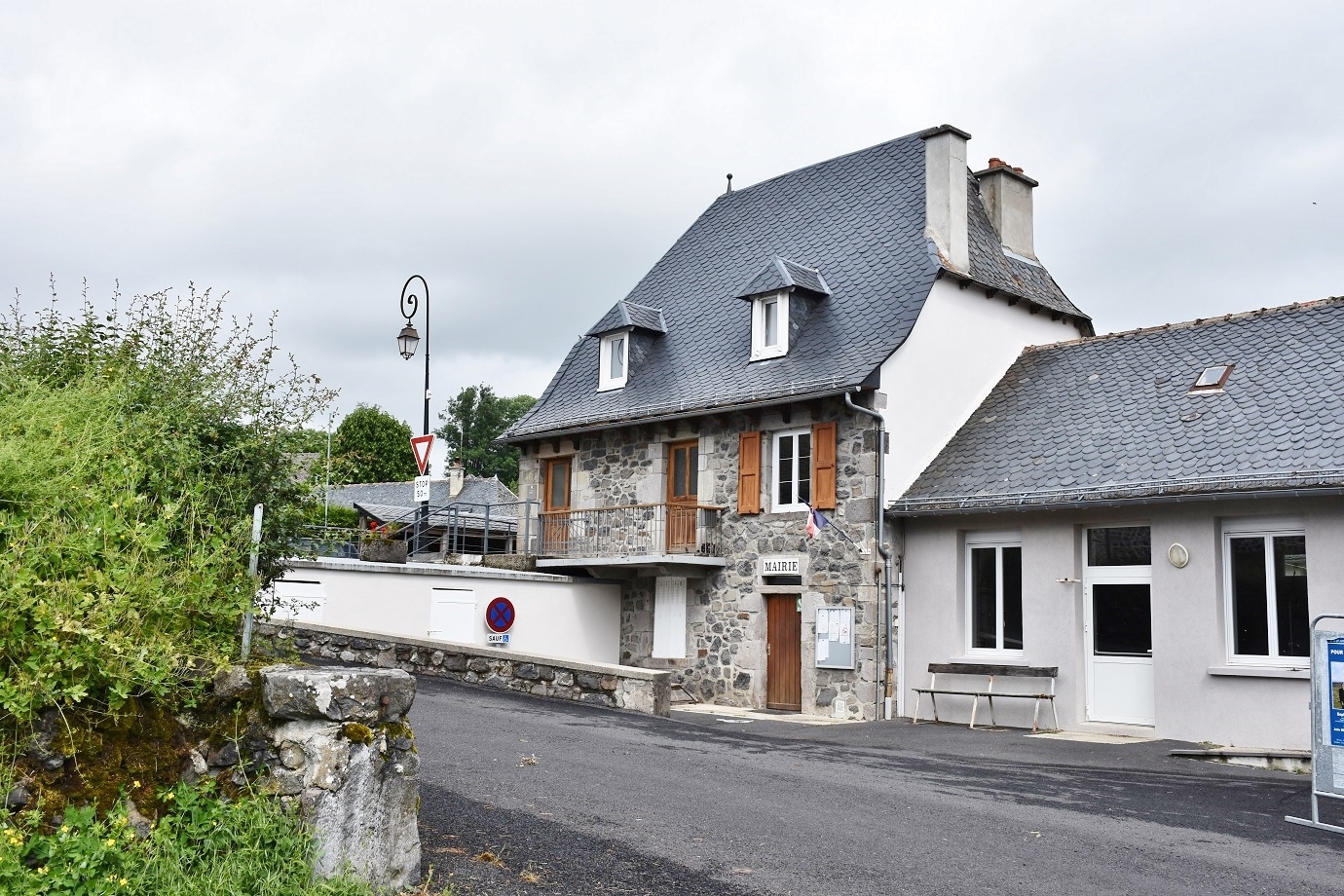
- Town hall
- Location of Lacapelle-Barrès
- Location within France Location within Auvergne-Rhône-Alpes
- Coordinates: 44°56′06″N 2°43′27″E
- Country: France
- Region: Auvergne-Rhône-Alpes
- Department: Cantal
- Arrondissement: Saint-Flour
- Canton: Saint-Flour-2

Government
  - Mayor (2020–2026): Richard Bonal
- Area^{1}: 6.3 km^{2} (2.4 sq mi)
- Elevation: 1,000 m (3,300 ft)
- Highest elevation: 1,233 m (4,045 ft)
- Lowest elevation: 927 m (3,041 ft)
- Population (2023): 57
  - Density: 9.0/km^{2} (23/sq mi)
- Time zone: UTC+01:00 (CET)
  - Summer (DST): UTC+02:00 (CEST)
- INSEE/Postal code: 15086 /15230
- ^{1} French Land Register data, which excludes lakes, ponds, glaciers > 1 km^{2} (0.386 sq mi or 247 acres) and river estuaries.

Lacapelle-Barrès (French pronunciation: [lakapɛl baʁɛs]; Occitan: La Capèla de Barrés) is a commune in the département of Cantal in south-central France.

== Population ==
Historical population
Year	Pop.	±% p.a.
1968	126	—
1975	110	−1.92%
1982	105	−0.66%
1990	110	+0.58%
1999	78	−3.75%
2007	55	−4.27%
2012	62	+2.42%
2017	57	−1.67%
2023	57	+0.00%
Source: INSEE

== See also ==
- Communes of the Cantal department
