= Jean Pierre Chardenon =

French physician and chemist

Jean Pierre Chardenon (1714 – 16 March 1769) was a French physician and chemist. Chardenon theorized on the medical aspects of chemistry including an attempt to explain the composition and origin of organic oils which he explained as being made up of acid, water, phlogiston, and earth.

Chardenon was born in Dijon, Province of Burgundy, to Guillaume and Marguerite Canquoin. He was baptized on 22 July 1714. Little is known of his education but his death certificate claimed that he studied medicine at Montpellier, but no such records exist. He became a surgeon in Paris but gave it up for a physician position in Dijon where he joined the one-year-old Académie des Sciences, Arts et Belles-Lettres de Dijon, serving as its secretary from 1752 for a decade. He connected ideas from physics with those in chemistry and from there to medicine. He interpreted the weight increase of metals upon calcination in 1762 as being due to the loss of phlogiston and used the analogy of a fishnet being buoyed up by corks. Once the corks were lost, just like phlogiston, the fishnet would become heavy, he claimed. He wanted to show his explanation through quantitative measurements from experiments but he died before doing so. It was however tried out by Louis-Bernard Guyton de Morveau. Chardenon accepted a form of the law of conservation of matter and believed that mercury affected the human body as a poison or as medicine because of its density and interaction with the bodily humors.
