= UFO sightings in France =

List of alleged UFO sightings within the nation of France

This is a list of alleged sightings of unidentified flying objects or UFOs in France.

== 815 ==
- The 815 treatise De Grandine et Tonitruis ("On Hail and Thunder") speaks of people who subscribed to the notion that a realm called Magonia exists. Magonia was thought to be the domain of beings who flew in sky ships and who would abscond with crops lost in inclement weather. The work went on to question proponents of Magonia's existence:

"Deluded by this folly so profound, we saw many in a human assembly present four people, three men and a woman, as prisoners who were supposed to have fallen from these ships. These kept them in bonds for several days, and finally, as I said, brought them forward in our presence to be stoned to death. But the truth prevailed, and after much discussion those who had presented them were put to shame according to the prophetic word, just as a thief is put to shame when he is caught."

— Archbishop Agobard of Lyon

== 1952 ==
- On 17 October 1952, several witnesses observed a cigar-shaped UFO accompanied by 30 disc-shaped objects in Oloron-Sainte-Marie. These smaller UFOs dropped a white siliceous cotton which covered tree branches and roofs. Some French sceptics thought that the UFOs were an optical phenomenon caused by the refraction of the Sun's rays and that the siliceous cotton was caused by a migration of field spiders.

== 1954 ==
- In September 1954, Marius Dewilde of Quarouble, Nord, claimed to have witnessed two small beings who paralyzed him when he attempted to approach them. He further claimed their UFO subsequently departed, and the case received notable media attention.

== 1965 ==
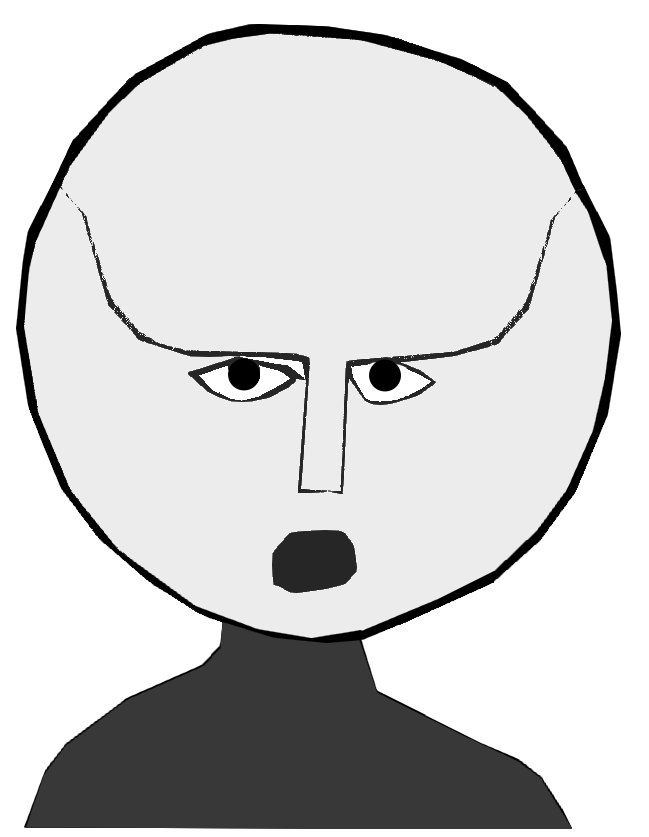
Depiction of one of the beings seen in Valensole, according to the book La nouvelle vague des soucoupes volantes.

- On 1 July 1965, an alleged UFO sighting and close encounter was reported to have occurred in Valensole, Alpes-de-Haute-Provence, which is known as the Valensole UFO Encounter. Farmer Maurice Masse encountered two small beings near a spherical vehicle that had landed in a nearby field. Masse claims that he was paralyzed when one of the beings pointed a tubelike object towards him. Masse said he watched the beings looking at plants and making grunting sounds until they returned to the vehicle and flew away. According to his wife, Masse said he received some kind of communication from the beings, considered his encounter "a spiritual experience", and looked upon the site as "hallowed ground" that "should be kept in his family forever". Ufologists consider Masse's claims significant and cite "landing gear impressions" found in the soil.
- In late September 1965, at the harbour in Fort-de-France, several hundred witnesses saw a ball or disk of light in the sky at 9:15 pm. It moved slowly from west to east and then looped around, leaving a glowing trail. The last part of its trajectory was observed through binoculars. It disappeared at 9:50 pm. This was reported by Michel Figuet, first timonier (helmsman) of the French fleet of the Mediterranean.

== 1967 ==
- On 29 August 1967, two young children, a brother and sister, reported witnessing a UFO and its occupants in Cussac, Cantal.

== 1976 ==
- On 5 November 1976, Dr. S., a French physicist, saw a "luminous disk moving in the sky" while driving home near Voreppe towards Grenoble. It was "brighter than the full moon" and slightly flattened. Due to its movement between mountains, it was possible to estimate its distance as lying between 9 and 36 kilometers (5.6 and 22.4 mi). The same phenomenon was allegedly witnessed by several people across a straight line stretching over 250 kilometers (160 mi), from Clermont-Ferrand to Grenoble. From this reported data, it was likewise possible to estimate that it was moving at an altitude of 1,500 to 2,500 feet (460 to 760 m).

== 1978 ==
- On 19 June 1978, several people witnessed a UAP, the presence of which allegedly turned off some electrical lighting in Gujan-Mestras, Gironde. The case was investigated by the local police and by GEPAN.

== 1981 ==
- On 8 January 1981, the Trans-en-Provence case occurred. is considered by ufologists to be one of the rare cases where a UFO left material traces. Critics allege it was a joke and that the traces were left by tyres.

== 1982 ==
- On 21 October 1982,. an ovoid object descended towards a garden in Nancy, France and hovered above the ground at 12:30 am. After 20 minutes, the object took off silently into the sky. The witness, a biologist, reported that when the UFO rose up, the grass under it stood up straight. In the afternoon, the witness noted that two amaranth plants located near the UFO had withered leaves. The witness called the Gendarmerie, which inspected the garden and took some samples of the amaranth plants. The analysis of the samples made by GEPAN found that the plants had been dehydrated, but there was no evidence of radiation.

== See also ==
- UFO sightings in Belgium
- List of reported UFO sightings
