= Tanavelle =

Commune in Auvergne-Rhône-Alpes, France

- Commune
- Location of Tanavelle
- Location within France Location within Auvergne-Rhône-Alpes
- Coordinates: 45°01′25″N 2°59′57″E
- Country: France
- Region: Auvergne-Rhône-Alpes
- Department: Cantal
- Arrondissement: Saint-Flour
- Canton: Saint-Flour-2
- Intercommunality: Saint-Flour

Government
  - Mayor (2020–2026): Gilbert Chevalier
- Area^{1}: 13.58 km^{2} (5.24 sq mi)
- Elevation: 1,082 m (3,550 ft)
- Highest elevation: 1,089 m (3,573 ft)
- Lowest elevation: 943 m (3,094 ft)
- Population (2023): 217
  - Density: 16.0/km^{2} (41.4/sq mi)
- Time zone: UTC+01:00 (CET)
  - Summer (DST): UTC+02:00 (CEST)
- INSEE/Postal code: 15232 /15100
- ^{1} French Land Register data, which excludes lakes, ponds, glaciers > 1 km^{2} (0.386 sq mi or 247 acres) and river estuaries.

Tanavelle (French pronunciation: [tanavɛl]; Occitan: Tanavela) is a commune in the département of Cantal in south-central France.

== Population ==
Historical population
Year	Pop.	±% p.a.
1968	259	—
1975	240	−1.08%
1982	213	−1.69%
1990	219	+0.35%
1999	250	+1.48%
2007	251	+0.05%
2012	240	−0.89%
2017	234	−0.51%
2023	217	−1.25%
Source: INSEE

== See also ==
- Communes of the Cantal department
