= Brigitte Van Tiggelen =

Belgian historian of chemistry

Brigitte Van Tiggelen (born 1962) is a Belgian historian of chemistry, the director of international affairs for the Science History Institute, the chair of the Commission on the History of Chemistry and the Molecular Sciences of the International Union of History and Philosophy of Science and Technology, and the former head of the Historical Division of the European Chemical Society.

Her 1998 doctoral thesis in the history of chemistry at UCLouvain, Un chimiste des Pays-Bas autrichiens au Siècle des Lumières : Karel van Bochaute. Science et contexte, was jointly supervised by Patricia Radelet-de Grave and Claude Bruneel.

== Books ==
Van Tiggelen is the author of Le quartier d’Houffalize (Atlas de géographie historique, Vol. 7, Press Universitaires de Louvain, 1993).

She is the coeditor of:

- The Public Image of Chemistry (with Joachim Schummer and Bernadette Bensaude-Vincent, World Scientific, 2007, doi:10.1142/6636)
- Neighbours and Territories: The Evolving Identity of Chemistry (with José Ramón Bertomeu-Sanchez and Duncan Thorburn Burns, Memosciences, 2008)
- Madame d’Arconville. Une femme de lettres et de sciences au siècle des Lumières (with Patrice Bret, Hermann, 2011)
- For Better or For Worse? Collaborative Couples in the Sciences (with Annette Lykknes and Donald L. Opitz, Springer, 2012)
- Domesticity in the Making of Modern Science (with Donald L. Opitz and Staffan Bergwik, Palgrave Macmillan, 2016);
- Women in Their Element: Selected Women's Contributions to the Periodic System (with Annette Lykknes, World Scientific, 2019, doi:10.1142/11442)
- Discovering the Elements: No Simple Stories (with Annette Lykknes, World Scientific, 2026, doi:10.1142/14334)
