= Villedieu, Cantal =

Commune in Auvergne-Rhône-Alpes, France

Villedieu
- Commune
- Location of Villedieu
- Location within France Location within Auvergne-Rhône-Alpes
- Coordinates: 45°00′00″N 3°03′54″E
- Country: France
- Region: Auvergne-Rhône-Alpes
- Department: Cantal
- Arrondissement: Saint-Flour
- Canton: Saint-Flour-2

Government
  - Mayor (2020–2026): Yolande Chassang
- Area^{1}: 18.99 km^{2} (7.33 sq mi)
- Elevation: 892 m (2,927 ft)
- Highest elevation: 1,045 m (3,428 ft)
- Lowest elevation: 795 m (2,608 ft)
- Population (2023): 535
  - Density: 28.2/km^{2} (73.0/sq mi)
- Time zone: UTC+01:00 (CET)
  - Summer (DST): UTC+02:00 (CEST)
- INSEE/Postal code: 15262 /15100
- ^{1} French Land Register data, which excludes lakes, ponds, glaciers > 1 km^{2} (0.386 sq mi or 247 acres) and river estuaries.

Villedieu (French pronunciation: [vildjø]; Occitan: Vialadieu) is a commune in the Cantal département in south-central France.

== Population ==
Historical population
Year	Pop.	±% p.a.
1968	413	—
1975	405	−0.28%
1982	463	+1.93%
1990	501	+0.99%
1999	515	+0.31%
2007	531	+0.38%
2012	525	−0.23%
2017	556	+1.15%
2023	535	−0.64%
Source: INSEE

== See also ==
- Communes of the Cantal department
