= Valuéjols =

Commune in Auvergne-Rhône-Alpes, France

- Commune
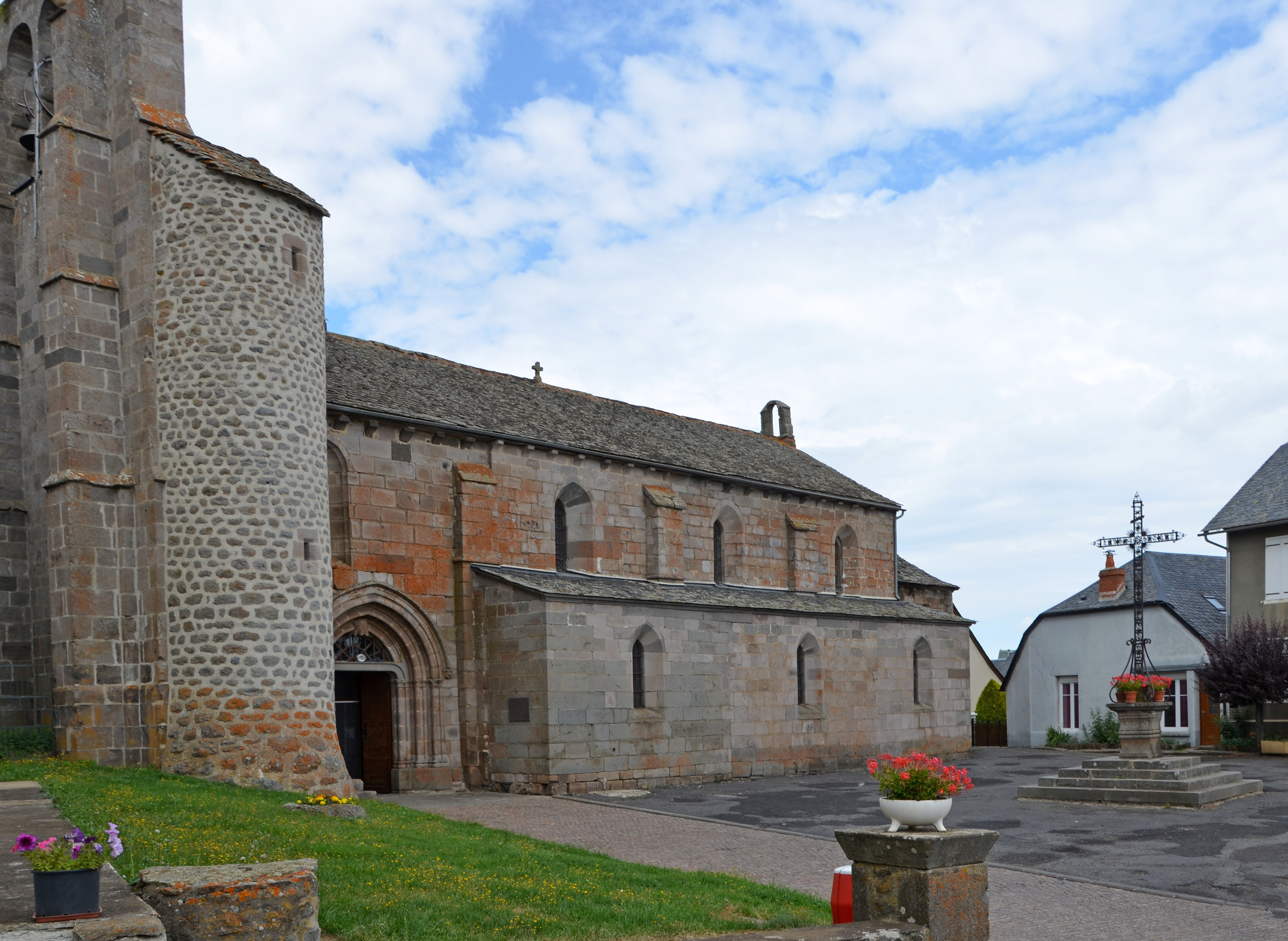
- The church of Saint-Saturnin, in Valuéjols

- Coat of arms
- Location of Valuéjols
- Location within France Location within Auvergne-Rhône-Alpes
- Coordinates: 45°03′14″N 2°56′05″E
- Country: France
- Region: Auvergne-Rhône-Alpes
- Department: Cantal
- Arrondissement: Saint-Flour
- Canton: Saint-Flour-2

Government
  - Mayor (2020–2026): Christophe Vidal
- Area^{1}: 38.51 km^{2} (14.87 sq mi)
- Elevation: 1,064 m (3,491 ft)
- Highest elevation: 1,410 m (4,630 ft)
- Lowest elevation: 974 m (3,196 ft)
- Population (2023): 580
  - Density: 15/km^{2} (39/sq mi)
- Time zone: UTC+01:00 (CET)
  - Summer (DST): UTC+02:00 (CEST)
- INSEE/Postal code: 15248 /15300
- ^{1} French Land Register data, which excludes lakes, ponds, glaciers > 1 km^{2} (0.386 sq mi or 247 acres) and river estuaries.

Valuéjols (French pronunciation: [valɥeʒɔl]; Occitan: Valuèjol) is a commune in the département of Cantal in south-central France. The name originates from Latin Avaloiolum which originates from the Gaulish word "*avallo-ialon" which is made up of the Gaulish word *aballo- which means 'apple tree' compounded with another Gaulish word "ialon" which means a 'clearing'.

== Population ==
Historical population
Year	Pop.	±% p.a.
1968	833	—
1975	696	−2.53%
1982	607	−1.94%
1990	578	−0.61%
1999	525	−1.06%
2007	523	−0.05%
2012	556	+1.23%
2017	565	+0.32%
2023	580	+0.44%
Source: INSEE

== See also ==
- Communes of the Cantal department
