= Paulhac, Cantal =

Commune in Auvergne-Rhône-Alpes, France

Paulhac
- Commune
- Location of Paulhac
- Location within France Location within Auvergne-Rhône-Alpes
- Coordinates: 45°00′26″N 2°54′18″E
- Country: France
- Region: Auvergne-Rhône-Alpes
- Department: Cantal
- Arrondissement: Saint-Flour
- Canton: Saint-Flour-2
- Intercommunality: Saint-Flour Communauté

Government
  - Mayor (2020–2026): Annie Andrieux
- Area^{1}: 46.92 km^{2} (18.12 sq mi)
- Elevation: 1,117 m (3,665 ft)
- Highest elevation: 1,485 m (4,872 ft)
- Lowest elevation: 991 m (3,251 ft)
- Population (2023): 431
  - Density: 9.19/km^{2} (23.8/sq mi)
- Time zone: UTC+01:00 (CET)
  - Summer (DST): UTC+02:00 (CEST)
- INSEE/Postal code: 15148 /15430
- ^{1} French Land Register data, which excludes lakes, ponds, glaciers > 1 km^{2} (0.386 sq mi or 247 acres) and river estuaries.

Paulhac is a commune in the Cantal department in south-central France.

== Population ==
Historical population
Year	Pop.	±% p.a.
1968	721	—
1975	692	−0.58%
1982	538	−3.53%
1990	511	−0.64%
1999	444	−1.55%
2007	458	+0.39%
2012	442	−0.71%
2017	414	−1.30%
2023	431	+0.67%
Source: INSEE

== See also ==
- Communes of the Cantal department
