= Cussac, Cantal =

Commune in Auvergne-Rhône-Alpes, France

Cussac
- Commune
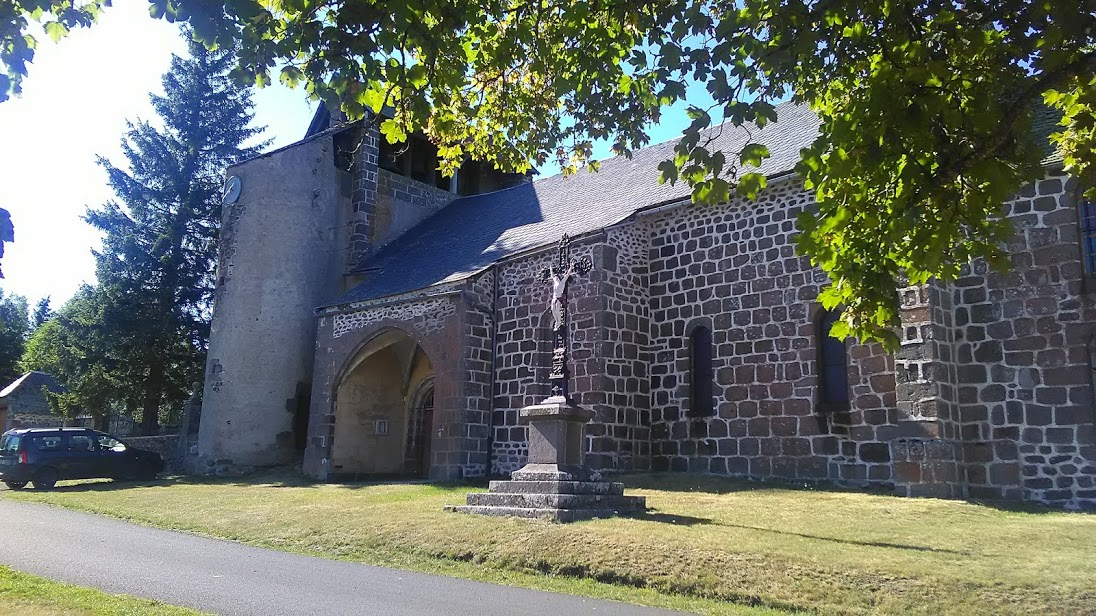
- Saint-Amand Church
- Location of Cussac
- Location within France Location within Auvergne-Rhône-Alpes
- Coordinates: 44°59′05″N 2°56′00″E
- Country: France
- Region: Auvergne-Rhône-Alpes
- Department: Cantal
- Arrondissement: Saint-Flour
- Canton: Saint-Flour-2

Government
  - Mayor (2020–2026): Guy Michaud
- Area^{1}: 13.68 km^{2} (5.28 sq mi)
- Elevation: 1,070 m (3,510 ft)
- Highest elevation: 1,079 m (3,540 ft)
- Lowest elevation: 880 m (2,890 ft)
- Population (2023): 117
  - Density: 8.55/km^{2} (22.2/sq mi)
- Time zone: UTC+01:00 (CET)
  - Summer (DST): UTC+02:00 (CEST)
- INSEE/Postal code: 15059 /15430
- ^{1} French Land Register data, which excludes lakes, ponds, glaciers > 1 km^{2} (0.386 sq mi or 247 acres) and river estuaries.

Cussac (French pronunciation: [kysak]; Occitan: Cuçac) is a commune in the Cantal department in the Auvergne region in south-central France.

== History ==
On August 29, 1967, two young siblings (François, 13 years old and Anne-Marie, 9 years old) claimed to have been the witnesses of a close encounter with a UFO and its occupants; the incident is now known as the close encounter of Cussac.

== Population ==
Historical population
Year	Pop.	±% p.a.
1968	236	—
1975	203	−2.13%
1982	175	−2.10%
1990	160	−1.11%
1999	135	−1.87%
2007	123	−1.16%
2012	136	+2.03%
2017	127	−1.36%
2023	117	−1.36%
Source: INSEE

== See also ==
- Communes of the Cantal department
- Close encounter of Cussac
