= Aviation in France =

- Aviation in Europe
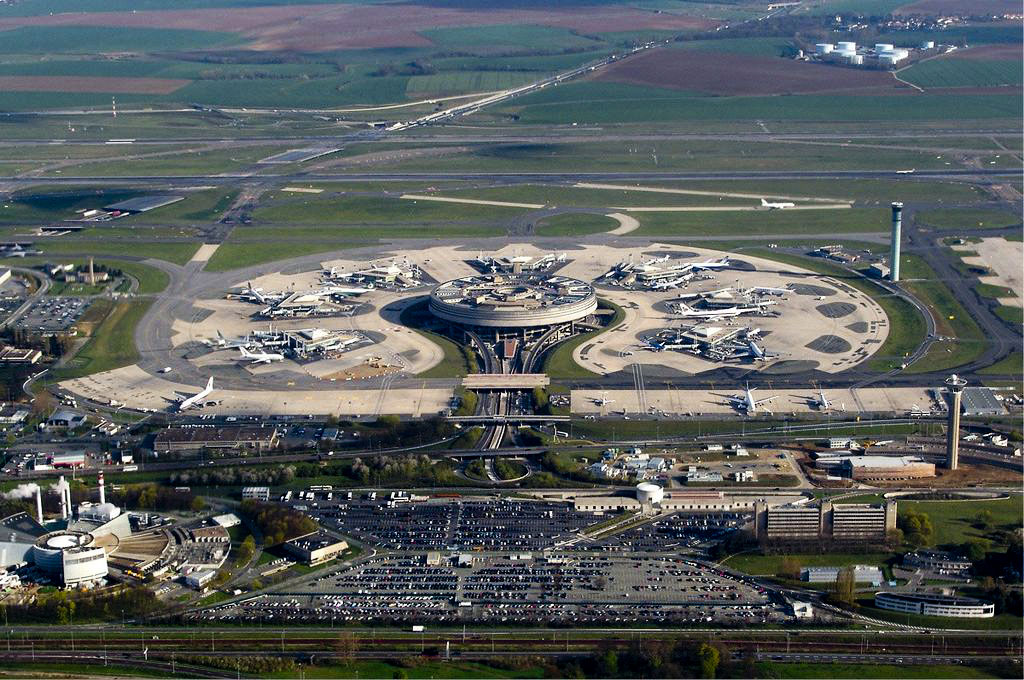
- Terminal 1 at Charles de Gaulle the country's largest airport

Airports
- Commercial – primary: 32
- Commercial – non-primary: 35
- General aviation: 401
- Military and other airports: 38

First flight
- July 25, 1909

Aviation in France dates back to the early 1900s the country's first flight was recorded by Louis Blériot in 1909. There were approximately 478 airports in France as of 2004.

Among the airspace governance authorities active in France, one is Aéroports de Paris, which has authority over the Paris region, managing 14 airports including the two busiest in France, Charles de Gaulle Airport and Orly Airport. The former, located in Roissy near Paris, is the fifth busiest airport in the world with 60 million passenger movements in 2008, and France's primary international airport, serving over 100 airlines.

The national carrier of France is Air France, a full service global airline which flies to 20 domestic destinations and 150 international destinations in 83 countries (including Overseas departments and territories of France) across all 6 major continents.

== History ==
=== Early history ===
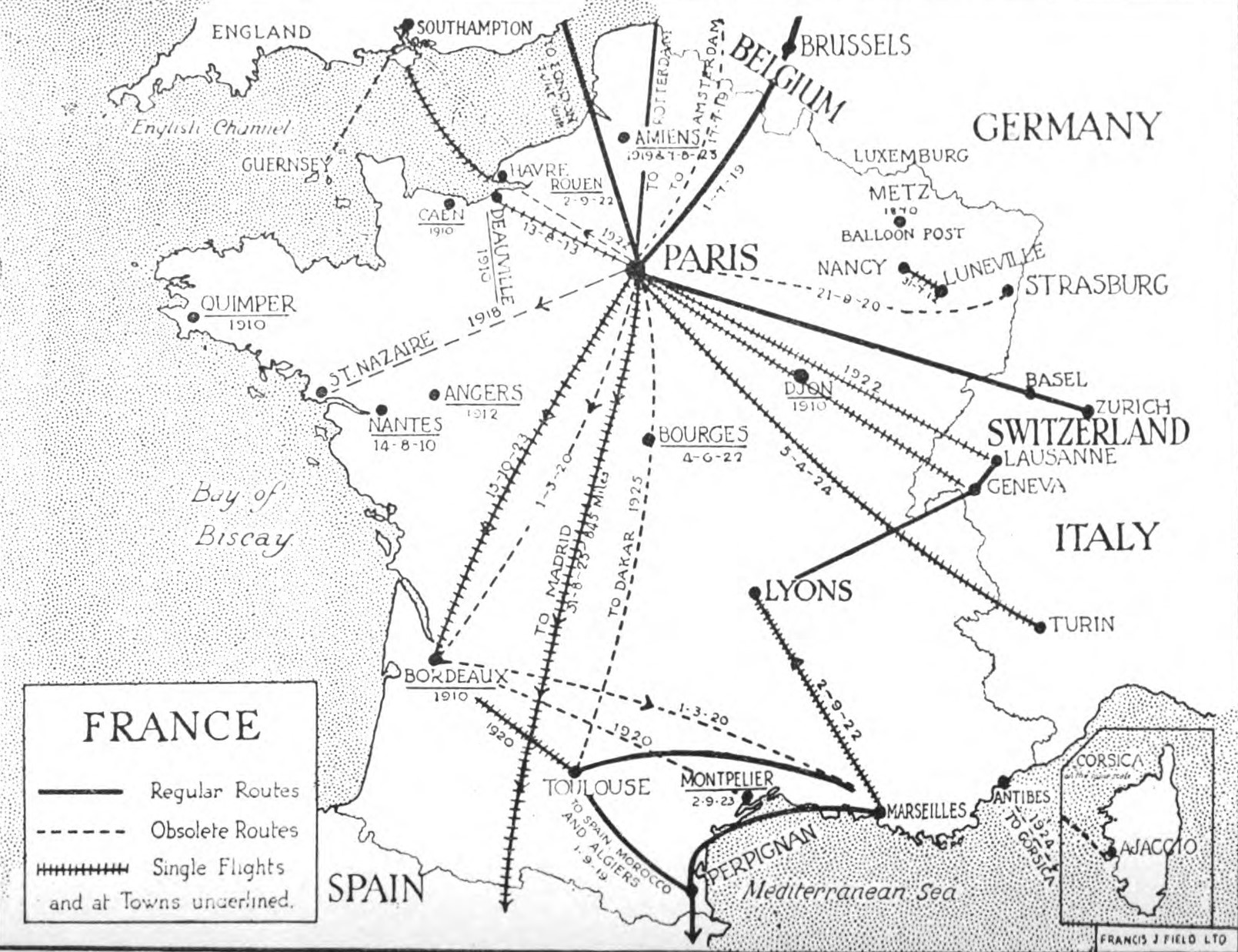
Air routes of France in 1925

The history of French aviation began at the beginning of the 20th century. The French had been involved in human flight since 1783, when François Rozier and the Marquis d'Arlandes flew over Paris in the first human flight in a Hot air balloon. On 7 January 1785 Jean-Pierre Blanchard crossed the English Channel, from Dover to Calais, on board a hydrogen balloon. He was accompanied by John Jeffries, who was the first passenger to fly from the United Kingdom to France. Fixed wing Aviation in France dates back to the early 1900s where the country's first fixed wing flight was recorded in 1909 by Louis Blériot. This was believed to be the first flight in Europe but many disagree and proving its legitimacy as the first flight in Europe is difficult. The country has been involved in many of the industries firsts, such as Charles Lindbergh flight across the Atlantic Ocean from New York to Paris in 1927, it was the first solo non-stop flight across the Atlantic.

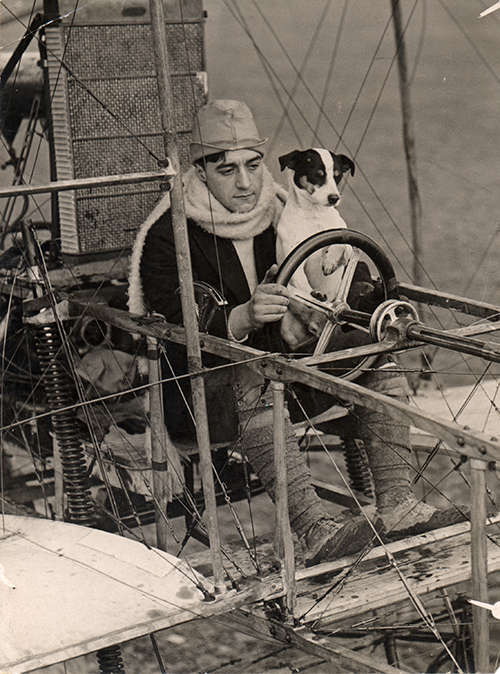
Edmond Poillot flying a Voisin biplane with a dog, Smithsonian National Air and Space Museum

=== Modern history ===
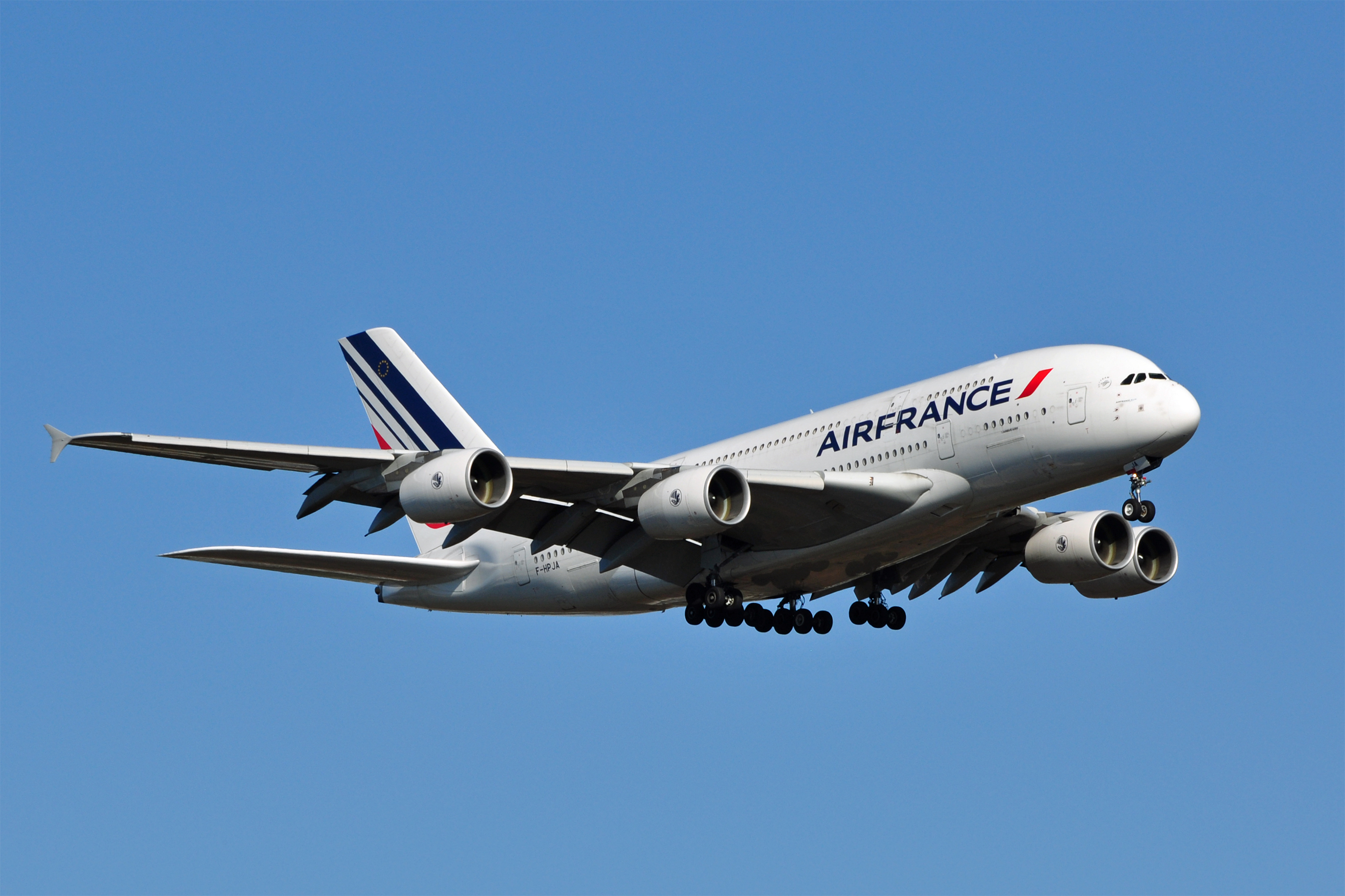
French airline Air France flying the French Airbus A380

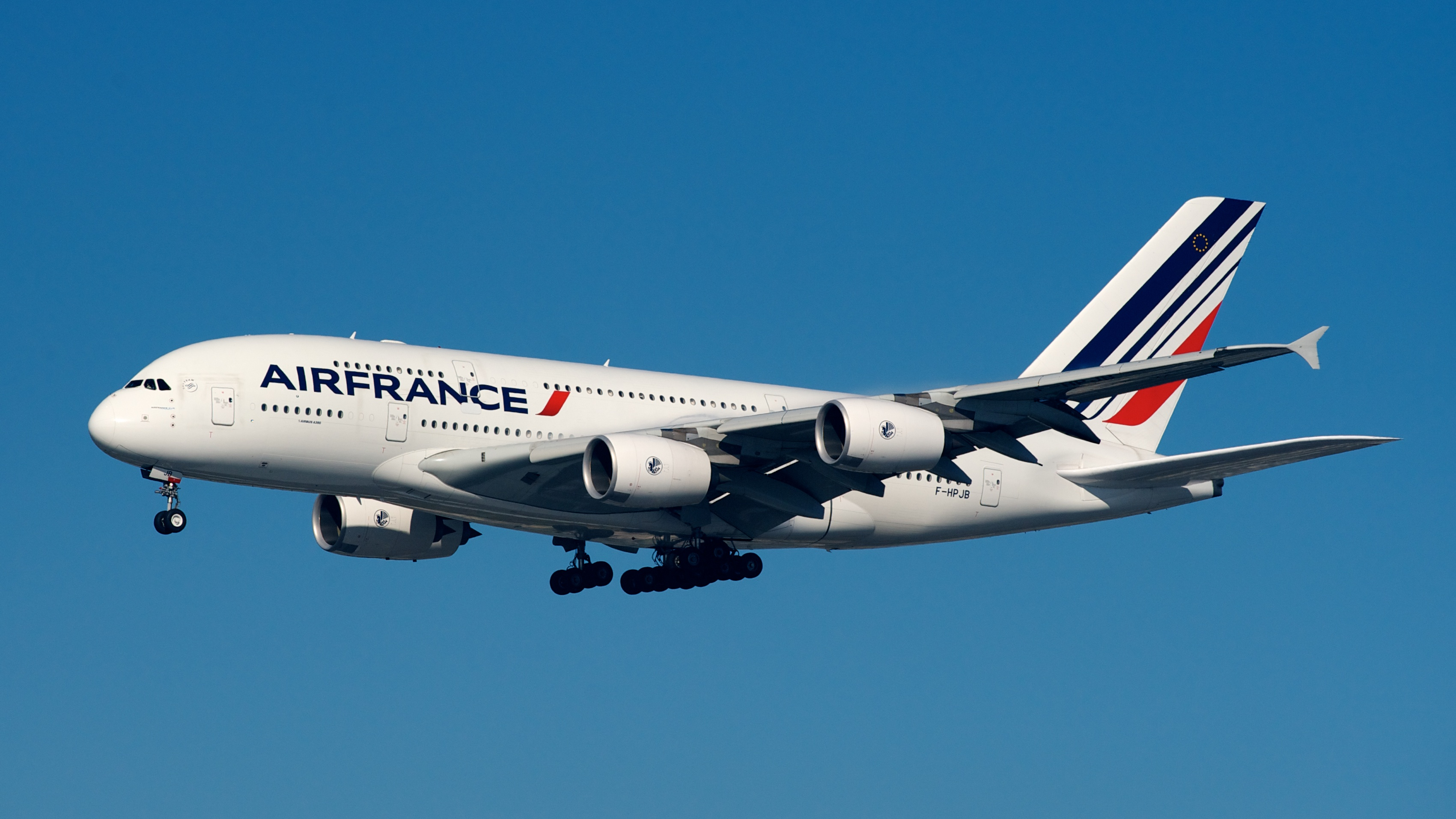
flag-carrier, Air France

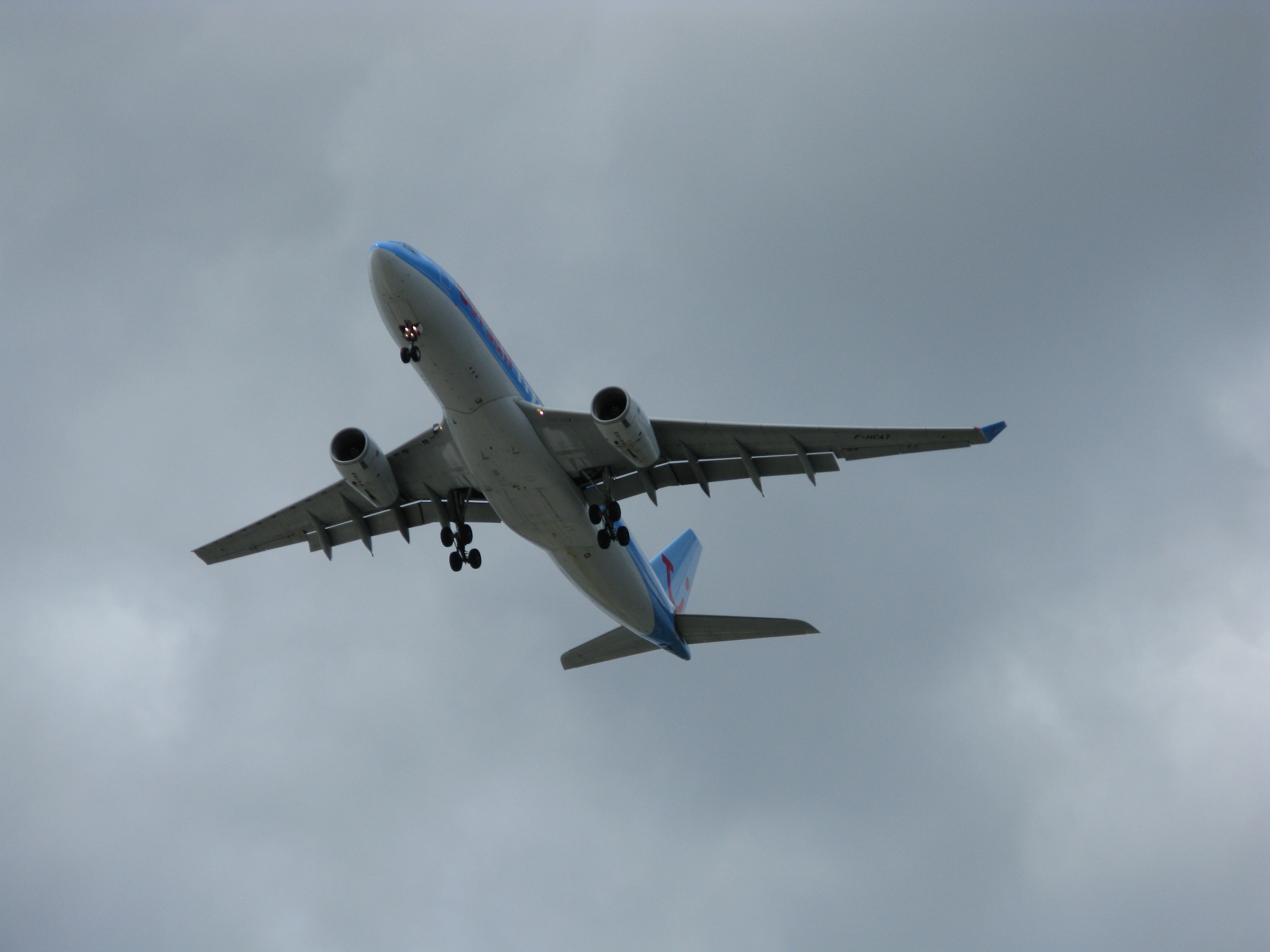
Corsair International

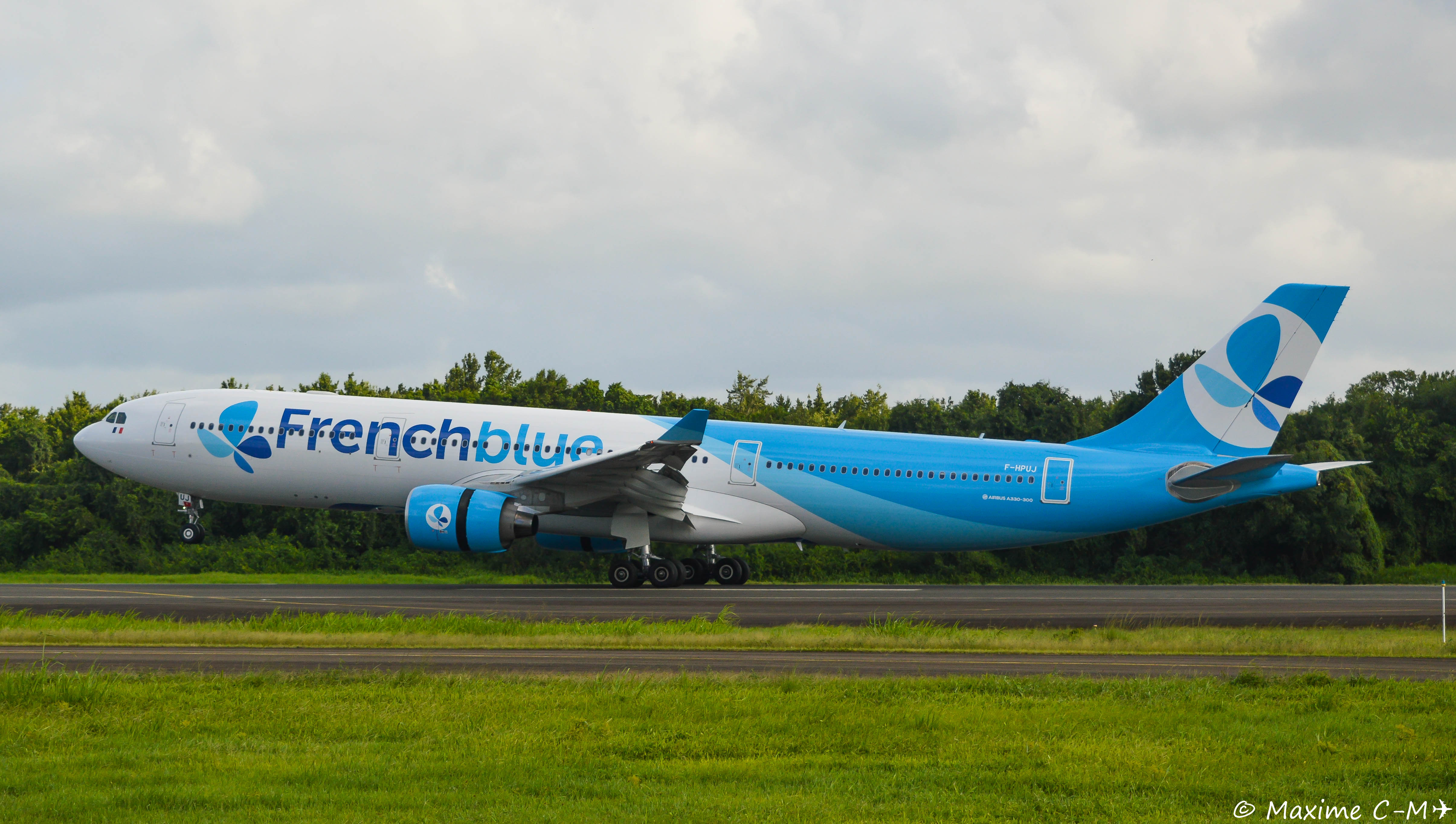
French Blue

France has been a leader in aviation throughout the modern era. One of the French's most prized exports is aircraft from French aerospace company Airbus. French airports and airlines have seen huge success in the 20th and 21st centuries. Airport number throughout the country have tripled and airlines are seeing steady passenger numbers.

== Major airports ==
The following are major airports in France with over 1,000,000 passenger numbers as of no later than 2010.

#	Airport name	Airport serves	Passengers	Trend	IATA	ICAO
1	Charles de Gaulle Airport	Paris	65,933,145	▲	CDG	LFPG
2	Orly Airport	Paris	31,237,865	▲	ORY	LFPO
3	Nice Côte d'Azur Airport	Nice	12,427,427	▲	NCE	LFMN
4	Lyon–Saint-Exupéry Airport	Lyon	9,553,250	▲	LYS	LFLL
5	Marseille Provence Airport	Marseille	8,475,809	▲	MRS	LFML
6	Toulouse–Blagnac Airport	Toulouse	7,517,736	▲	TLS	LFBO
7	EuroAirport Basel Mulhouse Freiburg	Mulhouse	6,519,393	▲	BSL	LFBS
8	Bordeaux–Mérignac Airport	Bordeaux	5,759,194	▲	BOD	LFBD
9	Nantes Atlantique Airport	Nantes	4,157,284	▼	NTE	LFRS
10	Beauvais–Tillé Airport	Beauvais	3,997,856	▼	BVA	LFOB
11	Lille Airport	Lille	1,596,700	▼	LIL	LFQQ
12	Montpellier–Méditerranée Airport	Montpellier	1,445,273	▲	MPL	LFMT
13	Ajaccio Napoleon Bonaparte Airport	Ajaccio	1,366,020	▲	AJA	LFKJ
14	Bastia – Poretta Airport	Bastia	1,162,840	▲	BIA	LFKB
15	Biarritz Airport	Biarritz	1,135,482	▲	BIQ	LFBZ

== Major airlines ==
Airline	Headquartered	Fleet size	Destinations	Load Factor	Notes
Air France	Tremblay-en-France	227	204	85.1%	Flag carrier/national airline, largest airline in France and 3rd largest airline in the world in terms of countries served.
Transavia France	Paray-Vieille-Poste	29	56	91.7%	Low-cost airline
Air Corsica	Ajaccio	10	17	83.4%	Airbus A320 and ATR 72 fleet
Corsair International	Rungis	7	12	88.3%	—
French Blue	Paris	2	3	N/A	Founded in 2016

- All Fleet and destinations numbers as of 2017
- Load factors as of 2015

== Aircraft manufacturing ==
Airbus word mark

France is home to aerospace giant Airbus, which has its headquarters and main facilities located in Toulouse.

The company has delivered over 10,000 commercial aircraft with the ten thousandth being delivered on 14 October 2016 to Singapore Airlines; it was an Airbus A350. In 2016 the manufacturers global fleet had performed more than 110 million flights over 215 billion kilometres, carrying 12 billion passengers.

Airbus's planes fly for hundreds of active airlines, governments and private owners all over the world. There is an operator on every continent and nearly every country.

== See also ==
- Transport in France
- Transport in the European Union
