= Les Ternes =

Commune in Auvergne-Rhône-Alpes, France

- Commune
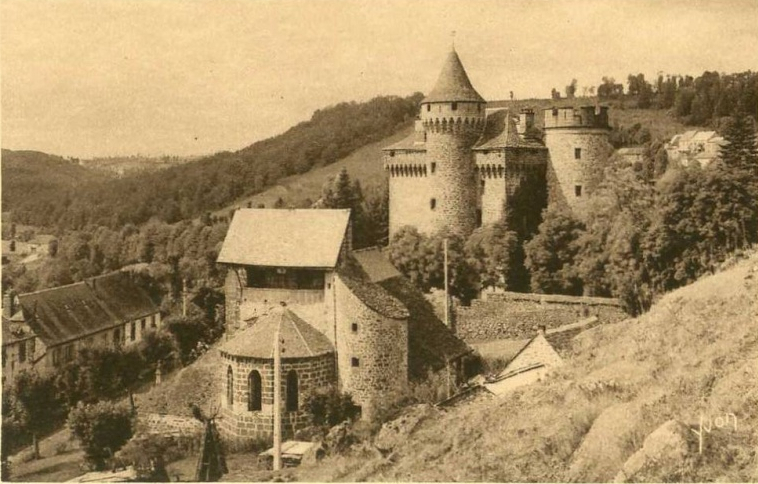
- The Chateau des Ternes after restoration

- Coat of arms
- Location of Les Ternes
- Location within France Location within Auvergne-Rhône-Alpes
- Coordinates: 44°59′57″N 3°00′52″E
- Country: France
- Region: Auvergne-Rhône-Alpes
- Department: Cantal
- Arrondissement: Saint-Flour
- Canton: Saint-Flour-2

Government
  - Mayor (2020–2026): Sylvie Portal
- Area^{1}: 19.13 km^{2} (7.39 sq mi)
- Elevation: 949 m (3,114 ft)
- Highest elevation: 1,061 m (3,481 ft)
- Lowest elevation: 896 m (2,940 ft)
- Population (2023): 567
  - Density: 29.6/km^{2} (76.8/sq mi)
- Time zone: UTC+01:00 (CET)
  - Summer (DST): UTC+02:00 (CEST)
- INSEE/Postal code: 15235 /15100
- ^{1} French Land Register data, which excludes lakes, ponds, glaciers > 1 km^{2} (0.386 sq mi or 247 acres) and river estuaries.

Les Ternes (French pronunciation: [le tɛʁn]; Occitan: Las Tèrnas) is a commune in the Cantal department in south-central France.

== Population ==
Historical population
Year	Pop.	±% p.a.
1968	459	—
1975	428	−0.99%
1982	425	−0.10%
1990	450	+0.72%
1999	455	+0.12%
2007	531	+1.95%
2012	599	+2.44%
2017	584	−0.51%
2023	567	−0.49%
Source: INSEE

== See also ==
- Communes of the Cantal department
