= Col de Font-de-Cère =

Mountain pass in Cantal, France

- Location within France
- Elevation: 1,289 metres (4,229 ft)
- Traversed by: Route nationale 126, D67

Third Approach
- Location: Cantal, France
- Range: Mounts of Cantal, Massif Central
- Coordinates: 45°05′07″N 02°43′59″E

The Col de Font-de-Cère is a mountain pass culminating at 1,289 m (4,229 ft), located in the Mounts of Cantal, in the department of the same name, and in the region of Auvergne-Rhône-Alpes, France.

== Toponymy ==
Font-de-Cère, said as Fònt de Cera in the Auvergnat dialect, means "sources of the Cère". Indeed, it is here that the Cère rises.

== Geography ==
The col is located between the Puy de Massebœuf and the Puy Griou, and connects the Alagnon valley (commune of Laveissière) to the Cère valley (commune of Saint-Jacques-des-Blats).

== History ==
Before the breakthrough of the Lioran tunnel, the pass was a place of important passage but dreaded. Indeed, it was deemed impassable in winter with snow drifts of three metres of snow preventing any passage during the nine long months of winter. During the summer it was mostly crossed by the Royal troops but was feared because of the Lioran forest, of wolves and bandits. Frequenting the route was dangerous as evidenced by numerous wooden and iron crosses along the road in the memories of people killed by bandits or wolves, or else surprised by the rigours of the winter. Despite being an easier crossing, these features pushed the majority of travellers to take the route of the old Roman road (the Via Celtica) which crossed the mountains of Cantal. After the breakthrough of the Lioran tunnel, the first tunnel of France and the longest in the world when built, the pass has become more frequented.

With the birth of the ski station of Le Lioran, the col is again popular and, in the early 1950s, the Font-de-Cère buron was built, which was a holiday site of the city of Le Mans for some years.

== Activities ==
A restaurant can be found at the col.

=== Cycling ===
The col is crossed by a paved road, known as imperial road, connecting Font d'Alagnon to Font-de-Cère. It is a 5.3 kilometres (3.3 mi) climb averaging 4.9%. The route was used during Stage 5 of the 2016 Tour de France, classified as a Category 3 climb, with Greg Van Avermaet first over the top enroute to winning the stage.

=== Walking ===
The col is an important place of passage for hikers during the summer, as it is located on the GR 4 (linking Royan to Grasse), and the GR 400 (Cantal Mountains route) leading to the Puy Mary.

=== Winter sports ===
In winter, the site is part of the ski station of Le Lioran and is frequented by followers of winter sports (skiing, snowshoeing, crosscountry skiing, etc.).
