= Puy de Seycheuse =

Mountain in central France

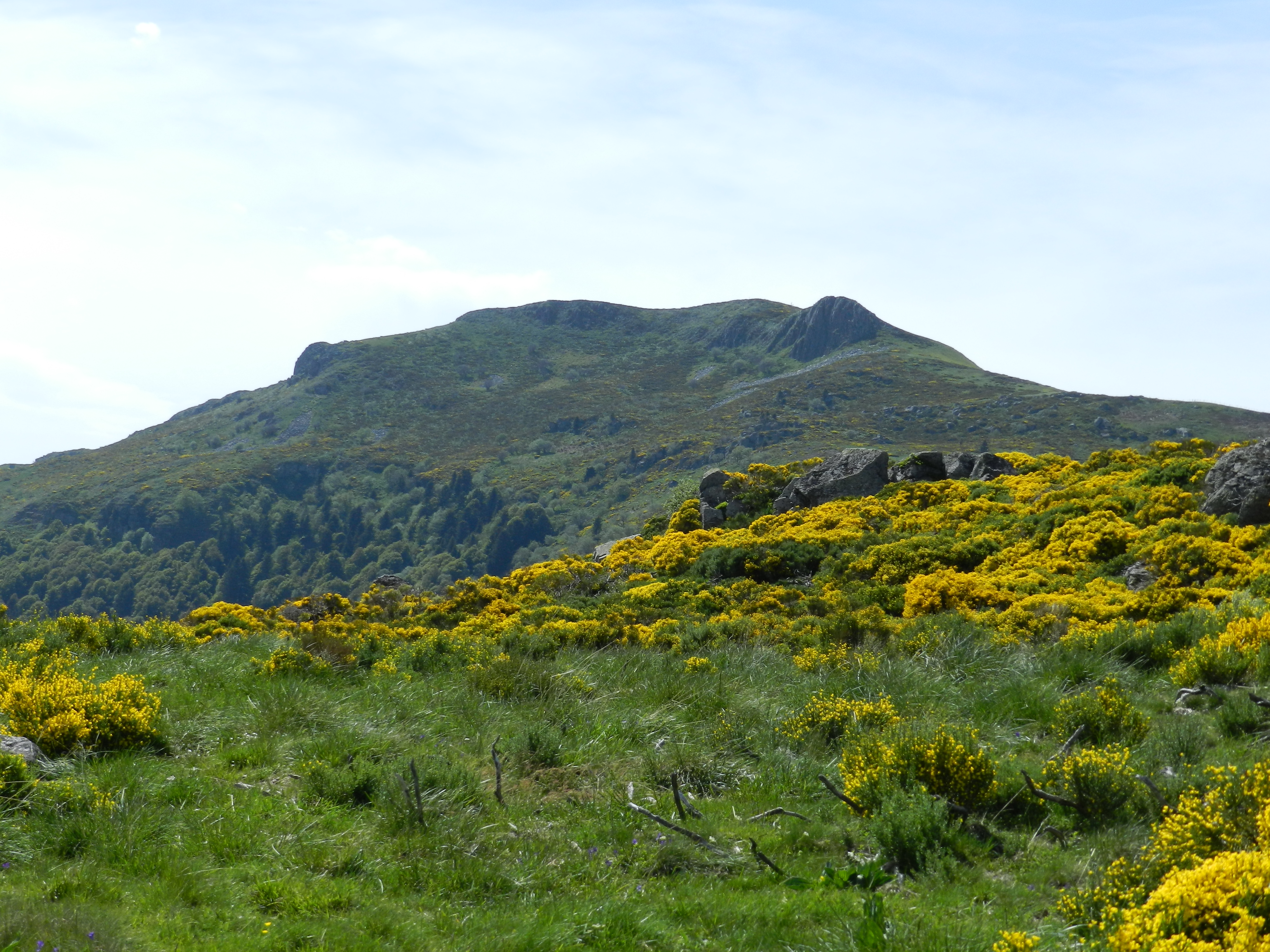
- View from the summit from Peyre Gary during the blooming of the broom.

Highest point
- Elevation: 1,647 m (5,404 ft)
- Coordinates: 45°07′09″N 2°45′19″E

Geography
- Location within France
- Location: Cantal departement, France
- Parent range: Mounts of Cantal (Massif Central)

The Puy de Seycheuse is a summit rising to 1,647 meters above sea level in the Mounts of Cantal. It is located between the valleys of the Alagnon (in the municipality of Laveissière) and the Santoire (in the municipality of Lavigerie).

== Geology ==
The Puy de Seycheuse is located in the eastern part of the Cantal stratovolcano, prominently positioned above the Alagnon Valley. Like many nearby summits, such as Puy Bataillouse, Téton de Vénus, and Bec de l'Aigle, it consists of a stack of trachyandesitic lava flows, indicative of the extremely violent phases of activity experienced by the stratovolcano between 8.5 and 6.5 million years ago.
