= Puy Chavaroche =

Mountain in central France

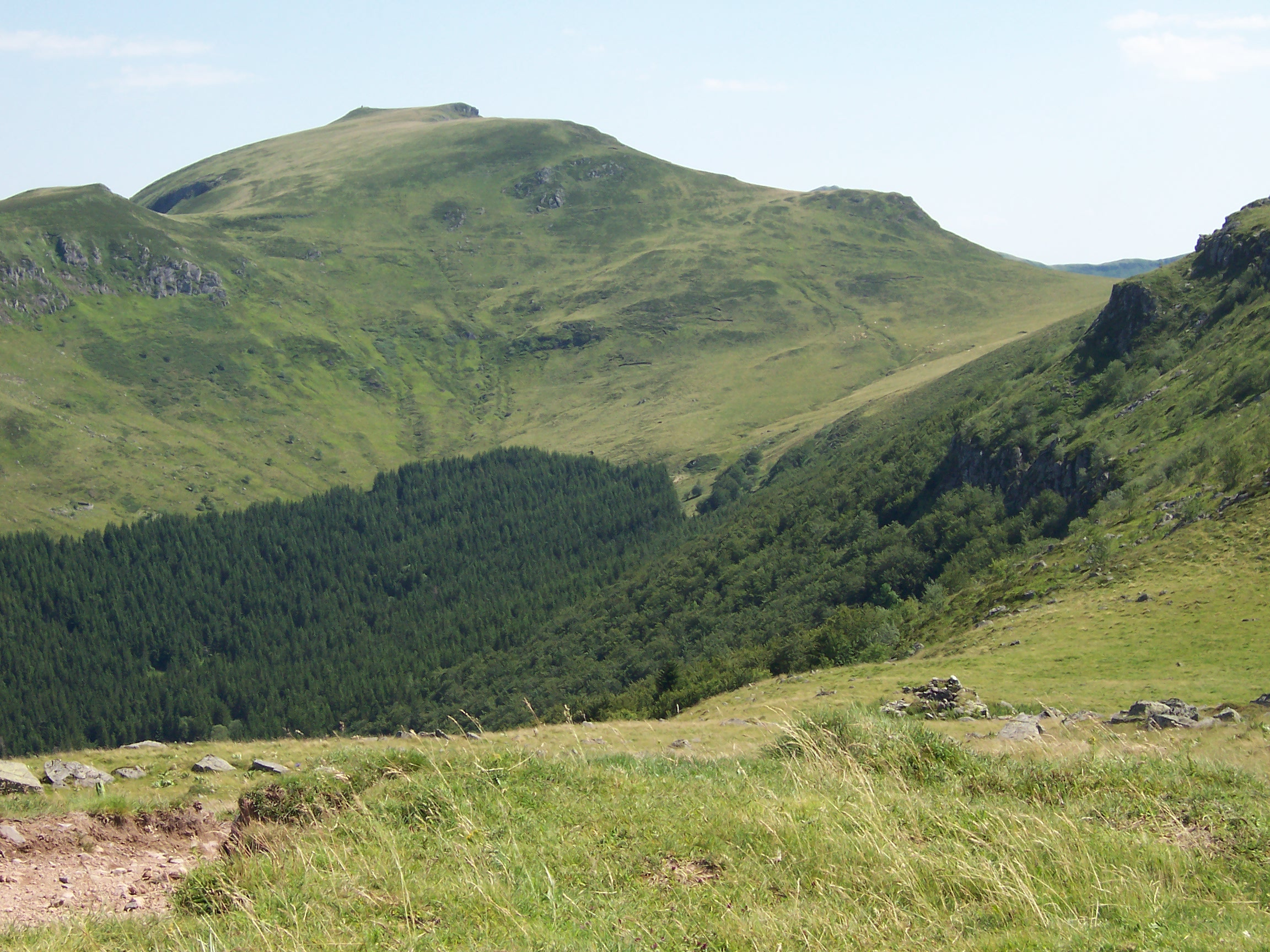

Highest point
- Elevation: 1,736 m (5,696 ft)
- Coordinates: 45°05′46″N 2°38′41″E

Geography
- Location within France
- Location: Cantal departement, France
- Parent range: Mounts of Cantal (Massif Central)

Puy Chavaroche is a French summit located in the Mounts of Cantal. It peaks at 1,736 meters above sea level. There is an impressive "stone man" where visitors can leave a stone to mark their passage. Puy Chavaroche is crossed by the Grande Randonnée 400 (GR 400) hiking trail.

== Toponymy ==
It is nicknamed the "goat mountain" due to the proximity of chava and chabra ("goat").

== Geology ==
Like several other peaks in the Cantal massif, Puy Chavaroche is composed of alternating layers of trachyandesite and volcanic breccias.

== Access ==
Puy Chavaroche can be reached on foot from the village of Mandailles, from the Col de Légal, or from the Pas de Peyrol. To the southwest lies the Roche Parlante.
