= Pas de Peyrol =

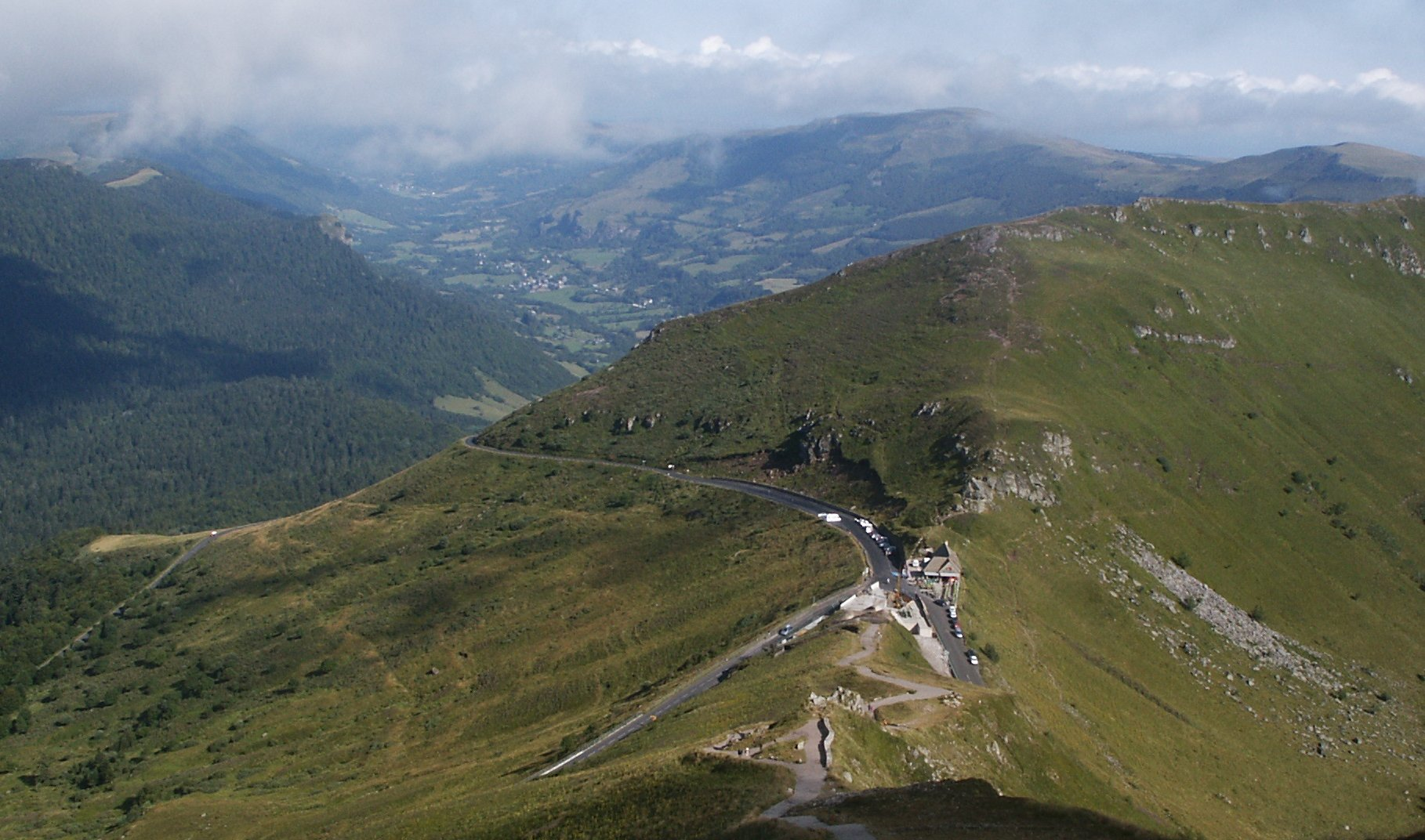
- Pas de Peyrol looking north from Puy Mary

- Location within France
- Elevation: 1,589 m (5,213 ft)
- Traversed by: D17/D680

Third Approach
- Location: Cantal, France
- Range: Mounts of Cantal (Massif Central)
- Coordinates: 45°06′50″N 02°40′19″E

Pas de Peyrol (el. 1,589 m) is a mountain pass located in Auvergne, France, and is the highest road pass in the Massif Central. The pass is on the slopes of Puy Mary (1,787 m) and is situated at the junction of three roads:

- D17 to the south-west towards Aurillac, via the Col de Redondet (1,531 m), then down the valley of the River Jordanne.
- D680 to the north-west towards Salers
- D680 to the east, towards Dienne, down the valley of the River Santoire

== Tour de France ==
The pass is regularly used on the Tour de France, most recently in the 2020 tour. The pass was first used in the 1959 Tour de France, on the 231 km stage 14 from Aurillac to Clermont Ferrand, with Louis Bergaud first across the summit. In the 2004 tour, the pass was used on stage 10 from Limoges to Saint-Flour, approaching from the Salers direction which includes a final three kilometres at an average of 12% and a maximum gradient of 15%, with Richard Virenque first over the summit. The same ascent was used as the finish of stage 13 in the 2020 Tour de France, which was won by Daniel Martínez.

=== Appearances in the Tour de France ===
The Tour de France has crossed or finished at the summit 13 times since 1947. The 10th stage of the 2004 tour was selected for the 2004 L'Étape du Tour, in which amateur and club riders ride over a full stage of the tour.

Year	Stage	Category	Start	Finish	Leader at the summit
2026	10	1	Aurillac	Le Lioran	Richard Carapaz (ECU)
2024	11	1	Evaux-les-Bains	Le Lioran	Tadej Pogačar (SLO)
2020	13	1	Châtel-Guyon	Puy Mary Pas de Peyrol	Daniel Martínez (COL)
2016	5	2	Limoges	Le Lioran	Thomas De Gendt (BEL)
2011	9	2	Issoire	Saint-Flour	Thomas Voeckler (FRA)
2008	7	2	Brioude	Aurillac	David de la Fuente (ESP)
2004	10	1	Limoges	Saint-Flour	Richard Virenque (FRA)
1985	15	2	Saint-Étienne	Aurillac	Eduardo Chozas (ESP)
1983	14	2	Aurillac	Issoire	Lucien Van Impe (BEL)
1975	14	3	Aurillac	Puy-de-Dôme	Lucien Van Impe (BEL)
1968	17	3	Aurillac	Saint-Étienne	Aurelio Gonzalez (ESP)
1963	14	3	Aurillac	Saint-Étienne	Federico Bahamontes (ESP)
1959	14	2	Aurillac	Clermont-Ferrand	Louis Bergaud (FRA)

== See also ==
- List of highest paved roads in Europe
- List of mountain passes
