= Puy de Peyre-Arse =

Mountain in central France

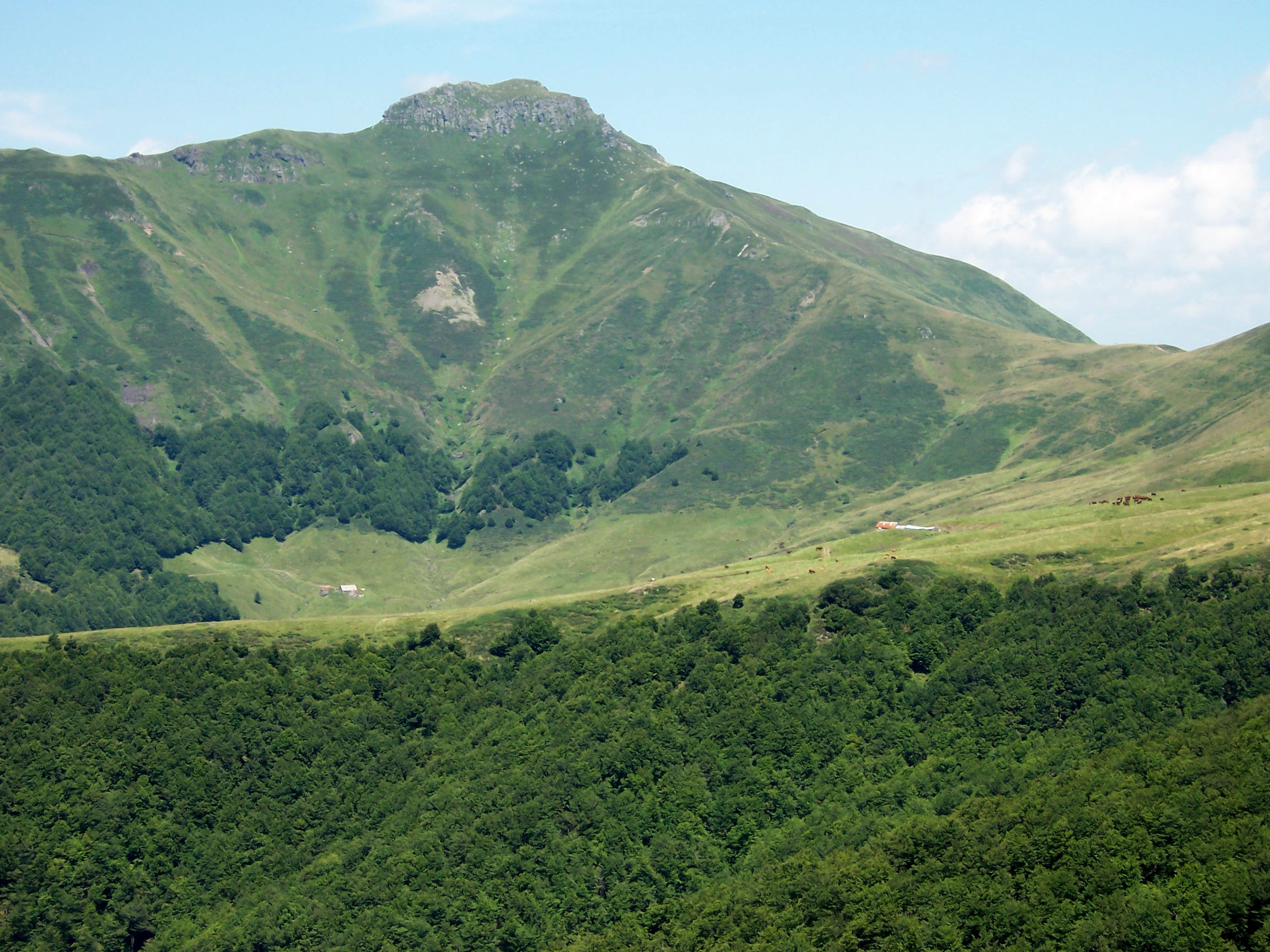
- The South face of Puy de Peyre-Arse.

Highest point
- Elevation: 1,806 m (5,925 ft)
- Coordinates: 45°06′36″N 2°42′39″E

Geography
- Location within France
- Location: Cantal departement, France
- Parent range: Mounts of Cantal (Massif Central)

The Puy de Peyre-Arse is a peak in the volcanic massif of Cantal (Massif Central), separating the valleys of the Jordanne, Impradine, and Santoire. It reaches an altitude of 1,806 meters.

== Toponymy ==
Pèira arsa means "burnt stone" in Auvergnat, the name evoking the rocky chaos and small cliffs that form the summit.

== Geography ==
=== Geology ===
The Peyre-Arse is formed by two trachyandesite flows dated at 7.8 million years ago, which form a "cliff" at the summit (visible in the photo). These flows overlay lahars composed of ash and pumice.

=== Access ===
The easiest ascent route is the GR 4 to the west, which follows the ridge line between Puy Mary and Peyre-Arse. Access is also possible from the southeast (Col de Cabre), but the ascent is significantly more strenuous.

== In culture ==
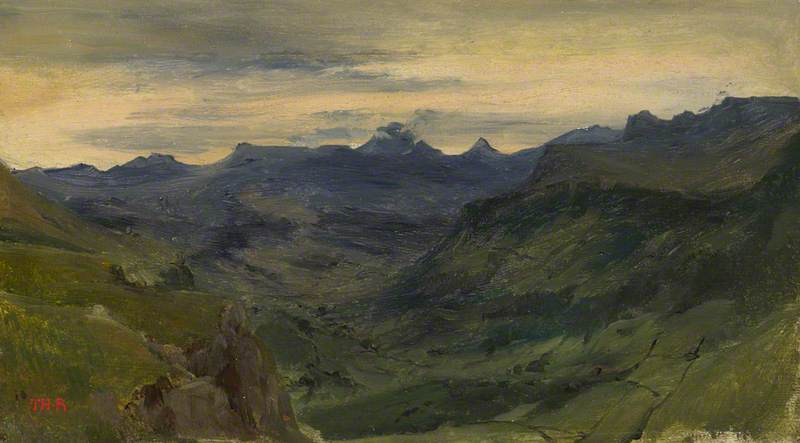
The Valley of St-Vincent, Théodore Rousseau, 1830, National Gallery, London.

The painter Théodore Rousseau traveled to Cantal in 1830 and produced numerous studies, including that of the Saint-Vincent-de-Salers valley. The valley is crossed by the Mars River and is home to many villages. Puy Mary is at the center, with the small peak of Puy de Peyre-Arse to its left, and below the sharp peak to the right is the Col du Redondet.
