= Col de Prat-de-Bouc =

Mountain pass in France

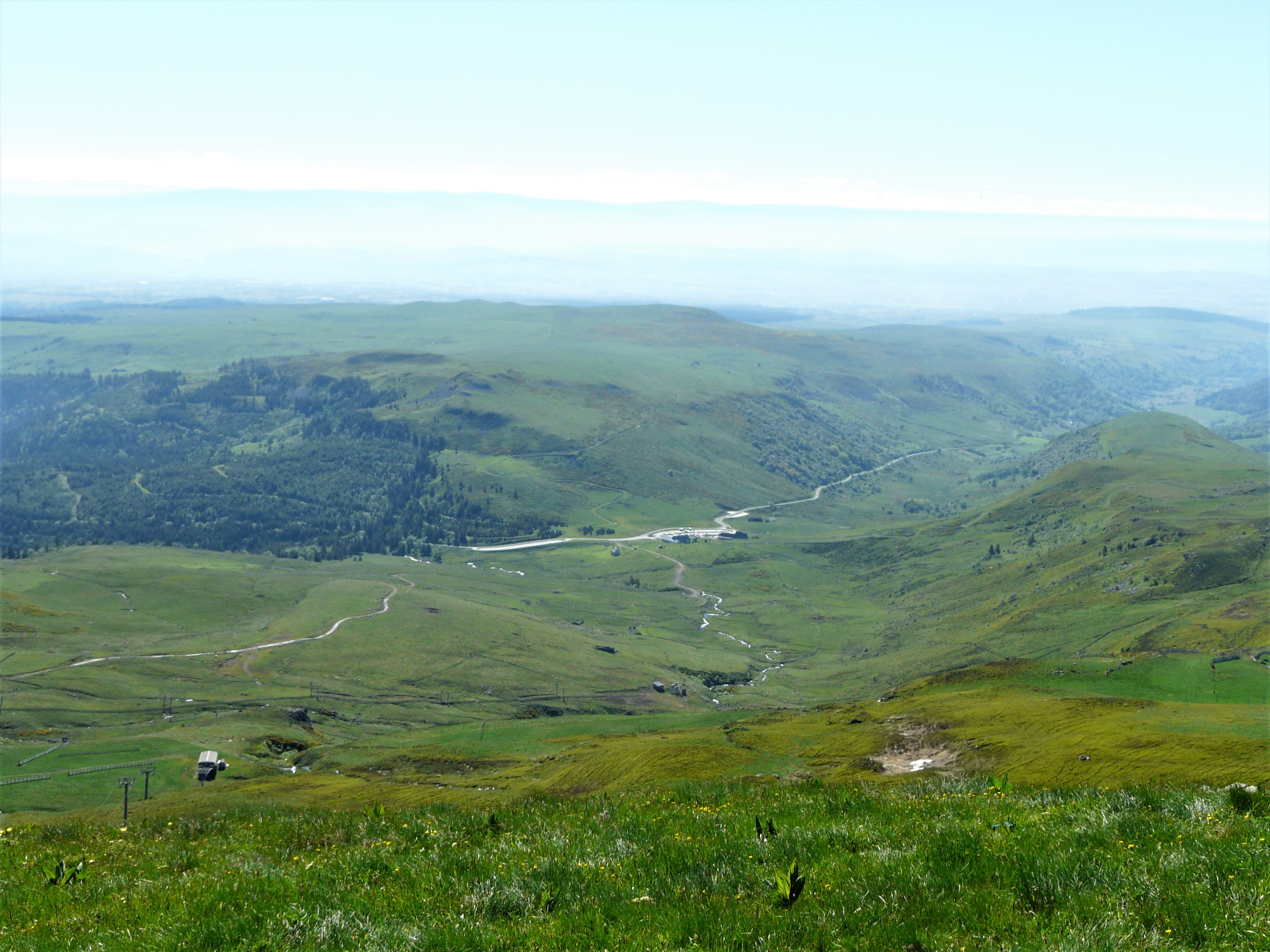
- The Col de Prat-de-Bouc.

- Location within France
- Elevation: 1,392 metres (4,567 ft)
- Traversed by: D39

Third Approach
- Location: Cantal, France
- Range: Mounts of Cantal (Massif Central)
- Coordinates: 45°03′11″N 02°47′37″E

The Col de Prat-de-Bouc is a mountain pass at an altitude of 1,392 meters located in the Mounts of Cantal, in the department of the same name, within the Massif Central. It is situated east of the Plomb du Cantal. At the foot of the pass lies the Lioran resort and the Prat de Bouc - Haute Planèze Nordic area.

== Geography ==
The pass can be crossed by two slopes:

- from the south, coming from Paulhac (via the hamlet of Bélinay) or from Cézens (via the hamlet of la Sagnette) or from Brezons passing through the Col de la Griffoul;
- from the north, coming from Murat and Albepierre-Bredons.

== Activities ==
=== Winter Sports ===
The Col de Prat-de-Bouc serves as one of the gateways to the Lioran ski resort. It has its own ski lifts for alpine skiing: 1 chairlift and 5 ski tows for 14 slopes, providing access to the Plomb du Cantal and the rest of the Lioran resort.

It is part of the Prat de Bouc - Haute Planèze cross-country skiing area.

=== Hiking ===
Prat-de-Bouc is the starting point for numerous hiking opportunities: hiking, mountain biking, cross-country skiing, ski touring, and trail running.

=== Rock ===
Climbing Several climbing routes are available at the Prés Marty rock, the Mouflon rock, the Montagnard rock, and the Chamalière rocks.

=== Birdwatching ===
The Col de Prat-de-Bouc is a key site for bird migration in Auvergne. Thousands of birds fly over it in the autumn. 163 bird species have been observed there since 1972. It is a Community Interest Area for birds and a Zone naturelle d'intérêt écologique, faunistique et floristique.

== Tour de France ==
It has been crossed 3 times by the Tour de France. It is classified as a Category 2 climb. Here are the riders who have been the first to reach the summit:

Year	Stage	Category	Start	Finish	Leader at the summit
2011	9	2	Issoire	Saint-Flour	Johnny Hoogerland (NED)
2004	10	2	Limoges	Saint-Flour	Richard Virenque (FRA)
1975	13	2	Albi	Super-Lioran	Eddy Merckx (BEL)
