= List of volcanoes in France =

This is a list of inactive and potentially active volcanoes in metropolitan France.

The Chaîne des Puys, the largest volcanic ensemble in Europe, is located in metropolitan France.

Name	Elevation		Location	Last eruption
Name	m	ft	Coordinates	Last eruption
Chaîne des Puys
Puy de Côme	1252	4108	45.4747°N 2.5636°E	5760 BC
Puy de Dôme	1464	4803	45.775°N 2.97°E	8700 BC
Puy de Lassolas	1183	3881	45.4238°N 2.5730°E	6200 BC
Other
Bas-Vivarais volcanic field	-	-	-	19,000 YA
Cantal stratovolcano	1855	6086	45.059°N 2.761°E	2 MYA
Massif de l'Esterel	618	2028	43.30°N 6.49°E	-
Devès Massif	1417	4649	45.02°N 3.38°E	600,000 YA
Mont Gerbier de Jonc	1551	5089	44°50′40″N 4°13′12″E	-
Puy de Sancy/Monts Dore	1886	6188	45°31′42″N 2°48′51″E	200,000 YA
Le Puy-en-Velay	744	2441	45.024°N 3.53°E	2.5 MYA
San Peyre	133	436	43.31°N 6.561°E	-

== See also ==
- List of volcanoes in French Polynesia
- List of volcanoes in French Southern and Antarctic Lands
- List of volcanoes in Martinique
- List of volcanoes in Réunion
