= Plomb du Cantal =

Mountain in central France

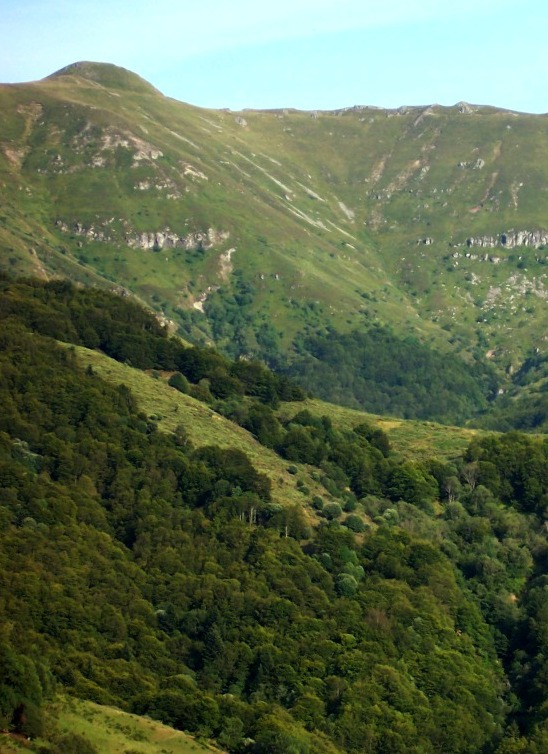

Highest point
- Elevation: 1,855 m (6,086 ft)
- Prominence: 774 m (2,539 ft)
- Isolation: 52.35 km (32.53 mi) to Puy de Sancy
- Coordinates: 45°03′31″N 2°45′41″E

Geography
- Location within France
- Location: Cantal departement, France
- Parent range: Mounts of Cantal (Massif Central)

The Plomb du Cantal (Occitan: Plom dau Cantal) is the highest summit of the Mounts of Cantal in the Massif Central, France. It is the second highest summit of the Massif Central, after the mountain of Puy de Sancy.

== Geography and geology ==
The summit is located in the eastern part of the volcanic massif of the Cantal. Formed of basanite, it is a remnant of a basaltic lake formed of solidified lava and is the site of the most recent volcanic activity in the range. It was formed 2.9 million years ago, above an accumulation of several layers of pyroclastic trachyandesite.

== Access ==
The summit is accessible from the ski resort of Super Lioran by a cable car and also from the pass of Prat-de-Bouc (in the east) via a hiking trail.
