= Arrondissements of the Cantal department =

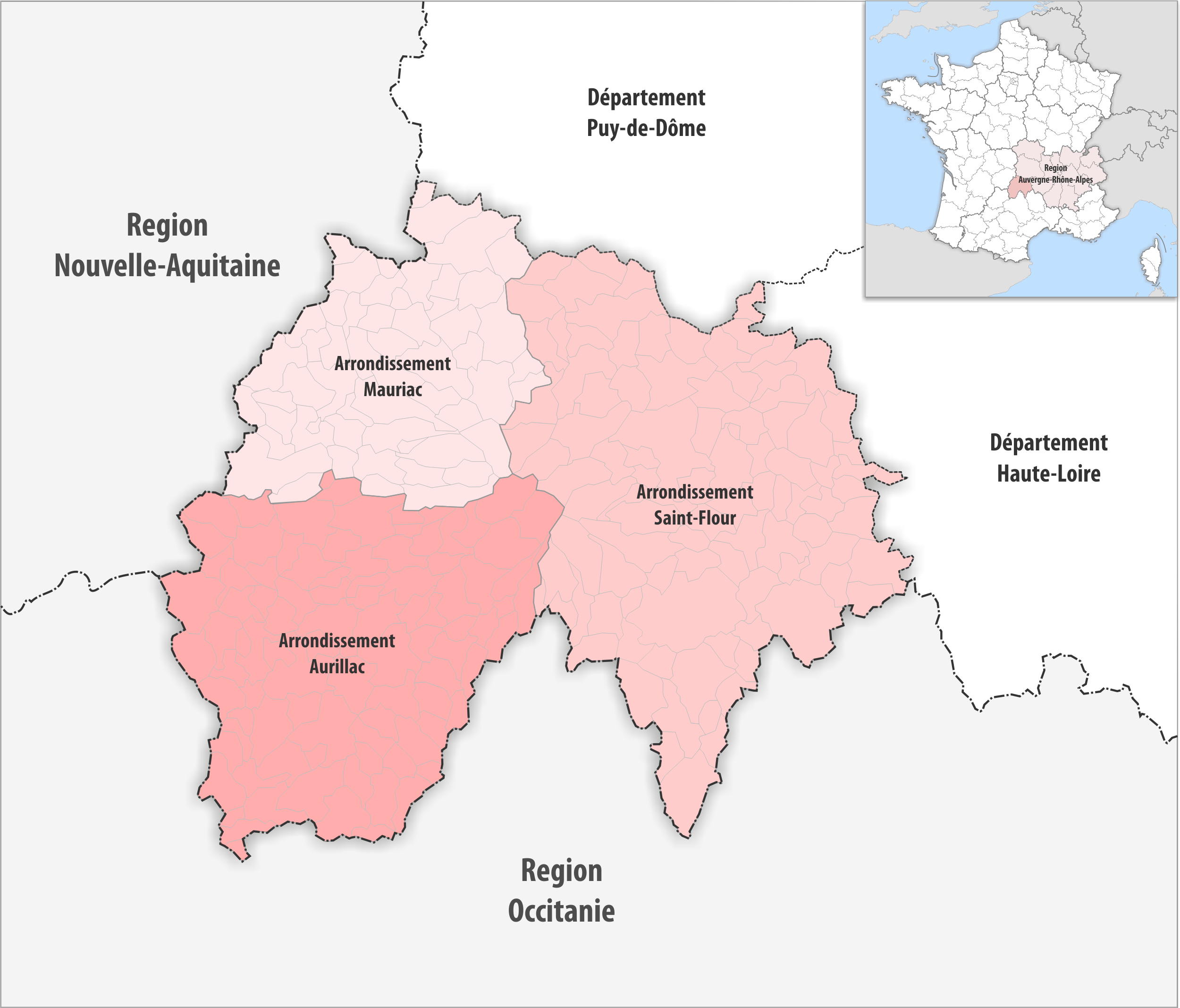
Map of arrondissements of the Cantal department.

The 3 arrondissements of the Cantal department are:

1. Arrondissement of Aurillac, (prefecture of the Cantal department: Aurillac) with 93 communes. The population of the arrondissement was 82,237 in 2021.
2. Arrondissement of Mauriac, (subprefecture: Mauriac) with 55 communes. The population of the arrondissement was 25,085 in 2021.
3. Arrondissement of Saint-Flour, (subprefecture: Saint-Flour) with 98 communes. The population of the arrondissement was 36,904 in 2021.

== History ==
In 1800, the arrondissements of Aurillac, Mauriac, Murat and Saint-Flour were established. The arrondissement of Murat was disbanded in 1926.
