= Lempdes-sur-Allagnon =

- Commune
- Coat of arms
- Location of Lempdes-sur-Allagnon
- Location within France Location within Auvergne-Rhône-Alpes
- Coordinates: 45°23′10″N 3°16′15″E
- Country: France
- Region: Auvergne-Rhône-Alpes
- Department: Haute-Loire
- Arrondissement: Brioude
- Canton: Sainte-Florine

Government
  - Mayor (2020–2026): Guy Lonjon
- Area^{1}: 10.4 km^{2} (4.0 sq mi)
- Highest elevation: 546 m (1,791 ft)
- Lowest elevation: 425 m (1,394 ft)
- Population (2023): 1,293
  - Density: 124/km^{2} (322/sq mi)
- Time zone: UTC+01:00 (CET)
  - Summer (DST): UTC+02:00 (CEST)
- INSEE/Postal code: 43120 /43410
- ^{1} French Land Register data, which excludes lakes, ponds, glaciers > 1 km^{2} (0.386 sq mi or 247 acres) and river estuaries.

Lempdes-sur-Allagnon (French pronunciation: [lɑ̃d syʁ alaɲɔ̃], literally Lempdes on Allagnon; Occitan: Lende, before 1996: Lempdes) is a commune in the Haute-Loire department in south-central France.

== Population ==
Historical population
Year	Pop.	±% p.a.
1968	1,583	—
1975	1,526	−0.52%
1982	1,510	−0.15%
1990	1,403	−0.91%
1999	1,371	−0.26%
2007	1,310	−0.57%
2012	1,324	+0.21%
2017	1,342	+0.27%
2023	1,293	−0.62%
Source: INSEE

== See also ==
- Communes of the Haute-Loire department
