= Polminhac =

Commune in Auvergne-Rhône-Alpes, France

- Commune
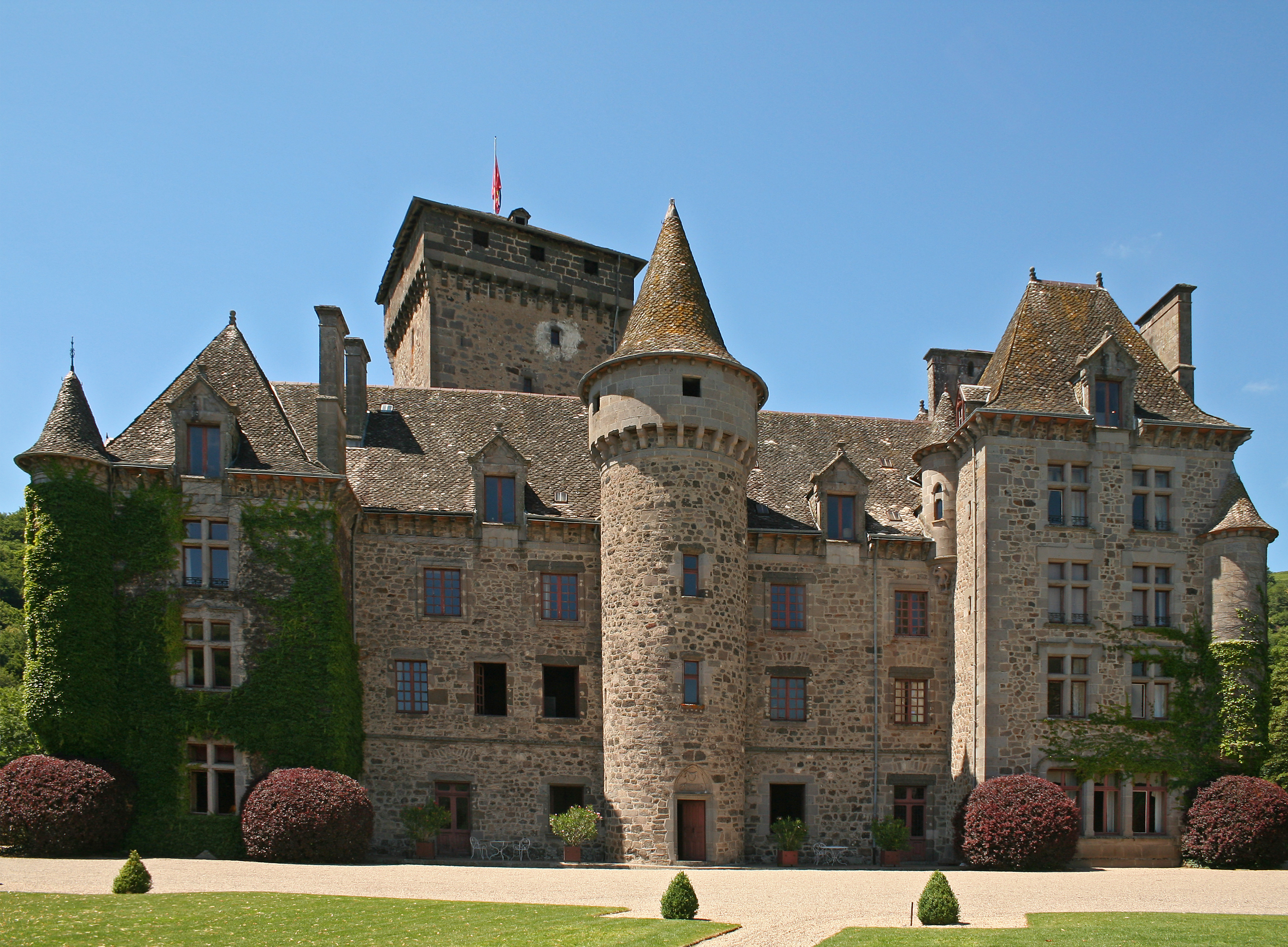
- French: Château de Pesteils
- Location of Polminhac
- Location within France Location within Auvergne-Rhône-Alpes
- Coordinates: 44°57′09″N 2°34′42″E
- Country: France
- Region: Auvergne-Rhône-Alpes
- Department: Cantal
- Arrondissement: Aurillac
- Canton: Vic-sur-Cère
- Intercommunality: Cère et Goul en Carladès

Government
  - Mayor (2020–2026): André Bonhomme
- Area^{1}: 29.03 km^{2} (11.21 sq mi)
- Elevation: 650 m (2,130 ft)
- Highest elevation: 1,178 m (3,865 ft)
- Lowest elevation: 629 m (2,064 ft)
- Population (2023): 1,197
  - Density: 41.23/km^{2} (106.8/sq mi)
- Time zone: UTC+01:00 (CET)
  - Summer (DST): UTC+02:00 (CEST)
- INSEE/Postal code: 15154 /15800
- ^{1} French Land Register data, which excludes lakes, ponds, glaciers > 1 km^{2} (0.386 sq mi or 247 acres) and river estuaries.

Polminhac (French pronunciation: [pɔlmiɲak]) is a commune in the Cantal department in south-central France.

== Population ==
Historical population
Year	Pop.	±% p.a.
1968	1,012	—
1975	1,132	+1.61%
1982	1,176	+0.55%
1990	1,135	−0.44%
1999	1,156	+0.20%
2007	1,113	−0.47%
2012	1,118	+0.09%
2017	1,163	+0.79%
2023	1,197	+0.48%
Source: INSEE

== See also ==
- Communes of the Cantal department
