= Alagnon =

River in central France

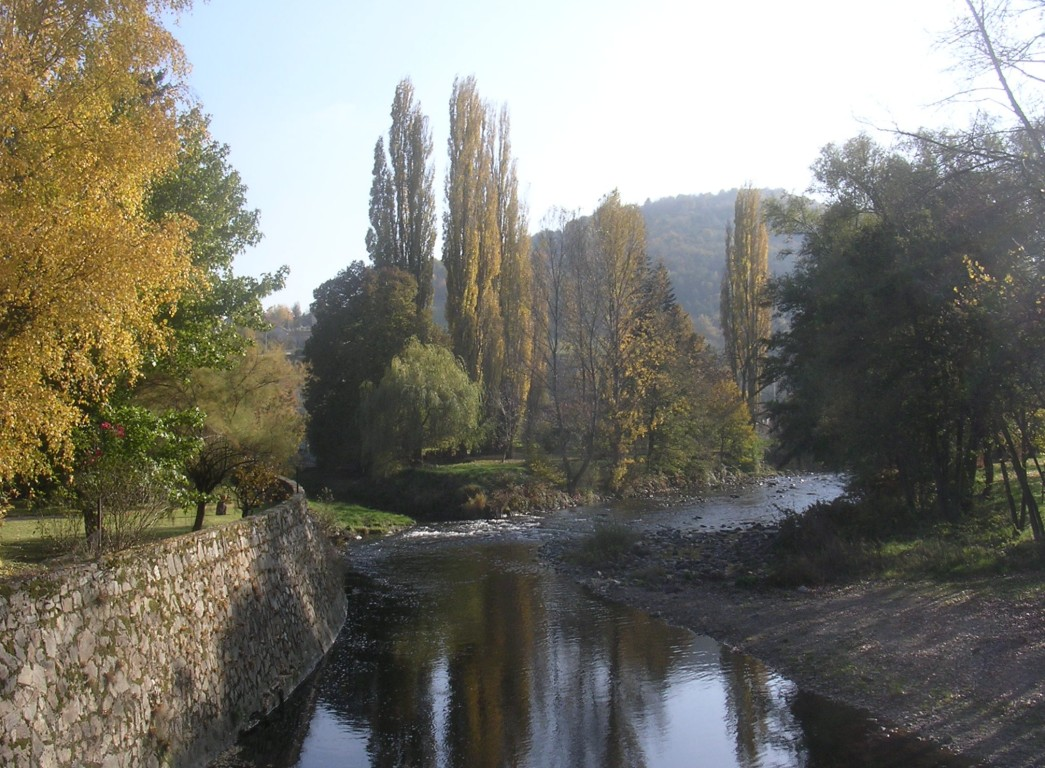

- Location within France Location within Auvergne-Rhône-Alpes

Location
- Country: France

Physical characteristics
- Source
  - location: Massif Central
- Mouth
  - location: Allier
  - coordinates: 45°27′5″N 3°18′14″E
- Length: 86.7 km (53.9 mi)

Basin features
- Progression: Allier→ Loire→ Atlantic Ocean

The Alagnon (French pronunciation: [alaɲɔ̃]; Occitan: Alanhon), also spelled Allagnon, is an 86.7-kilometre-long (53.9 mi) river in south-central France. It is a left tributary of the river Allier. Its source is near the village of Laveissière, near the Plomb du Cantal in the Massif Central. The Alagnon flows generally northeast through the following departments and towns:

- Cantal: Murat, Massiac
- Haute-Loire: Lempdes-sur-Allagnon
- Puy-de-Dôme: Beaulieu

The Alagnon flows into the river Allier at Auzat-la-Combelle.
