= Mounts of Cantal =

Mountainous massif in the mid-west of the Massif Central, France

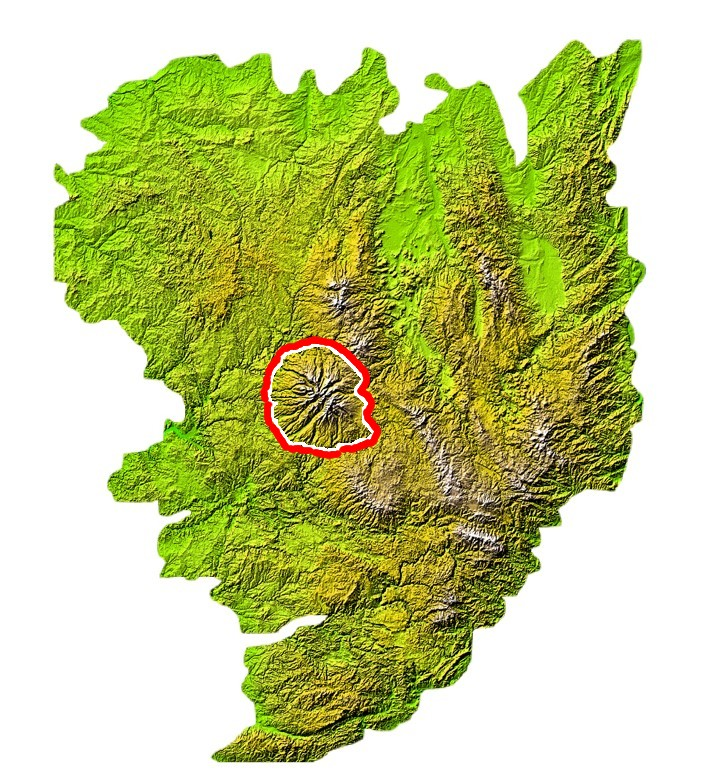
- Map showing the location of the Mounts of Cantal in the Massif Central.

Highest point
- Elevation: 1,855 m (6,086 ft) at Plomb du Cantal
- Coordinates: 45.058937°N 2.761506°E

Geography
- Location: Auvergne-Rhône-Alpes, France
- Parent range: Massif Central

The Mounts of Cantal (or Volcanoes of Cantal; French: Monts du Cantal [mɔ̃ dy kɑ̃tal]; Occitan: Munts del Cantal) are a mountainous massif in the mid-west of the Massif Central, France, made up of the remnants of the largest stratovolcano of Europe, which was formed from 13 million years ago and last erupted approximately 2 million years ago, reaching estimated heights between 3,500 and 4,000 meters. However, the main part of the volcanic activity was concentrated between 8.5 and 7 million years. Thereafter, the original volcano was largely eroded, massive landslides occurred, and it was further eroded by glaciers and water.

== Geomorphology ==
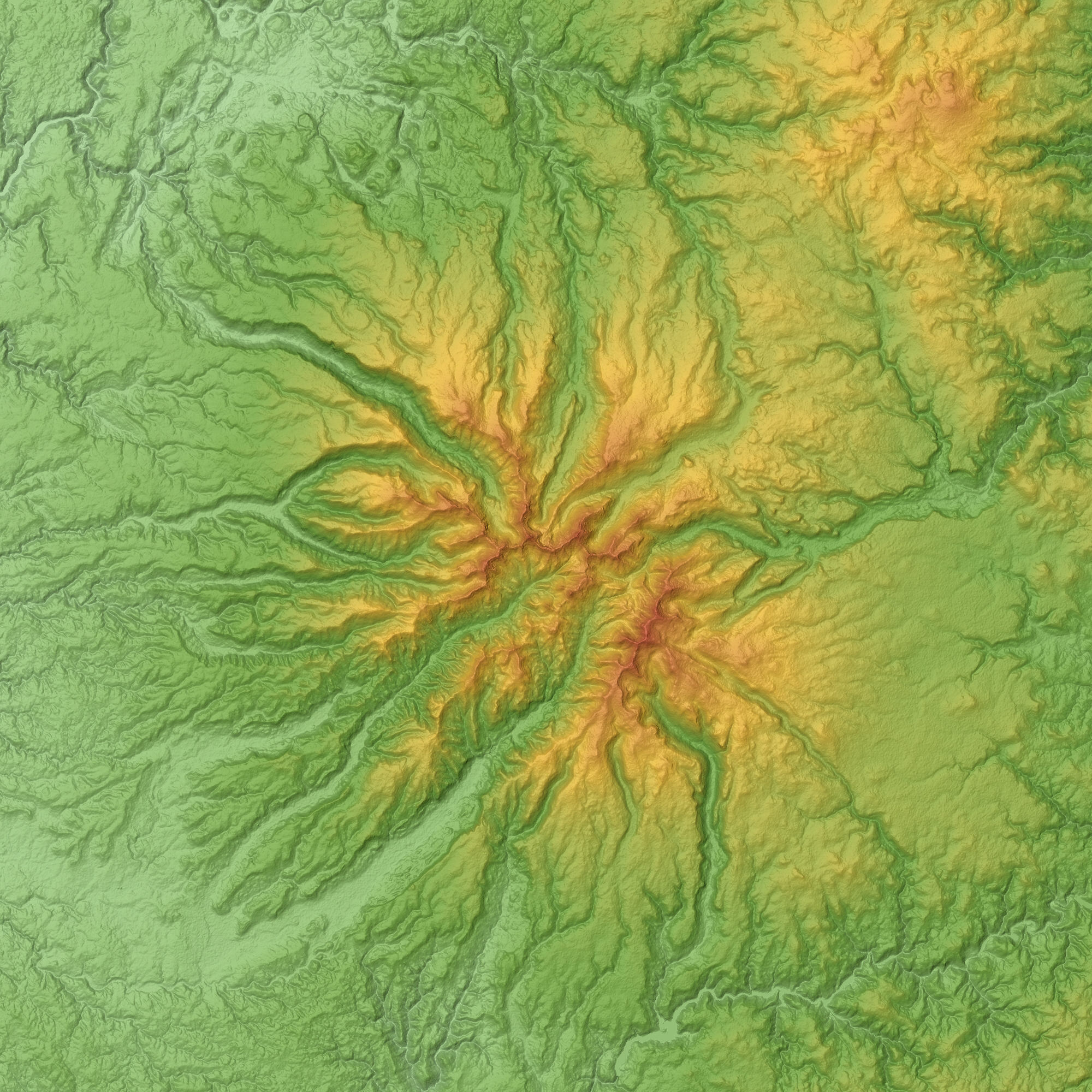
Relief map of the Mounts of Cantal

The stratovolcano of Cantal is the widest in Europe. It is roughly circular with a diameter between 50 and 70 km (30–40 mi). Its highest point is the Plomb du Cantal (1,855 m, 6,086 ft), located in the eastern part of the massif. Around 20 valleys have been formed in the range, radiating out from the centre and cutting the basaltic plateau into triangular pieces called planèzes. These valleys were occupied by glaciers during the last ice age, which explains their U-shape.

== Topography ==
=== Main summits ===
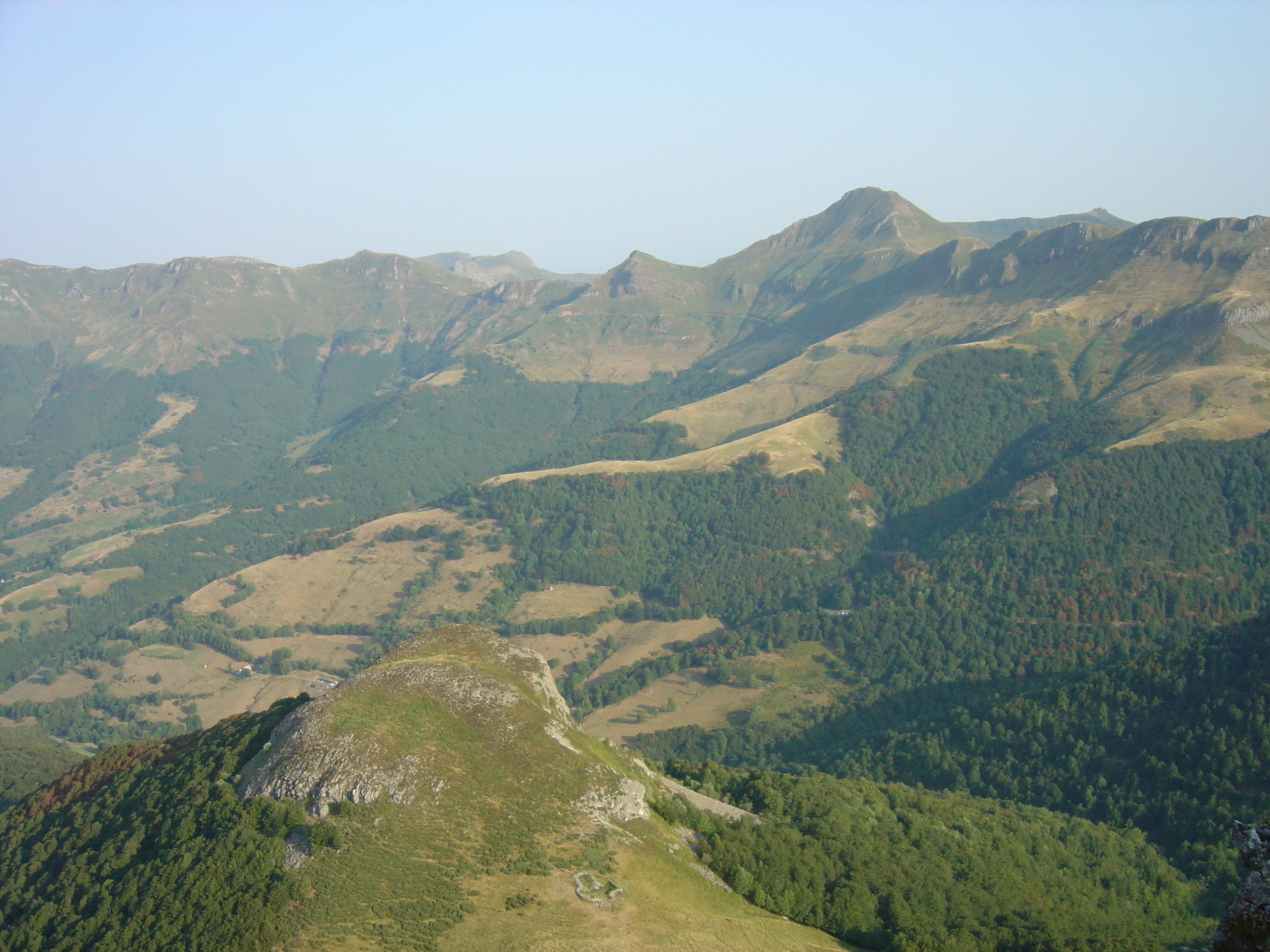
Landscape of the Mounts of Cantal

The mounts of the Cantal are composed of several summits, the best known being:

- Puy Mary (1,787 m, 5,863 ft), which offers a beautiful panorama from its summit;
- Plomb du Cantal (1,855 m, 6,086 ft), accessible from the ski resort of Super Lioran and from the pass of the Col de Prat-de-Bouc;
- Puy Griou (1,690 m, 5,545 ft);
- Puy Chavaroche (1,736 m, 5,696 ft);
- Puy de Peyre-Arse (1,806 m, 5,925 ft), offering a magnificent panorama of the glacial valleys of Santoire and Impradine;
- Puy de Seycheuse (1,647 m, 5,404 ft), which offers a panorama of the glacial cirque of Santoire and the valley of Alagnon.

== Economy ==
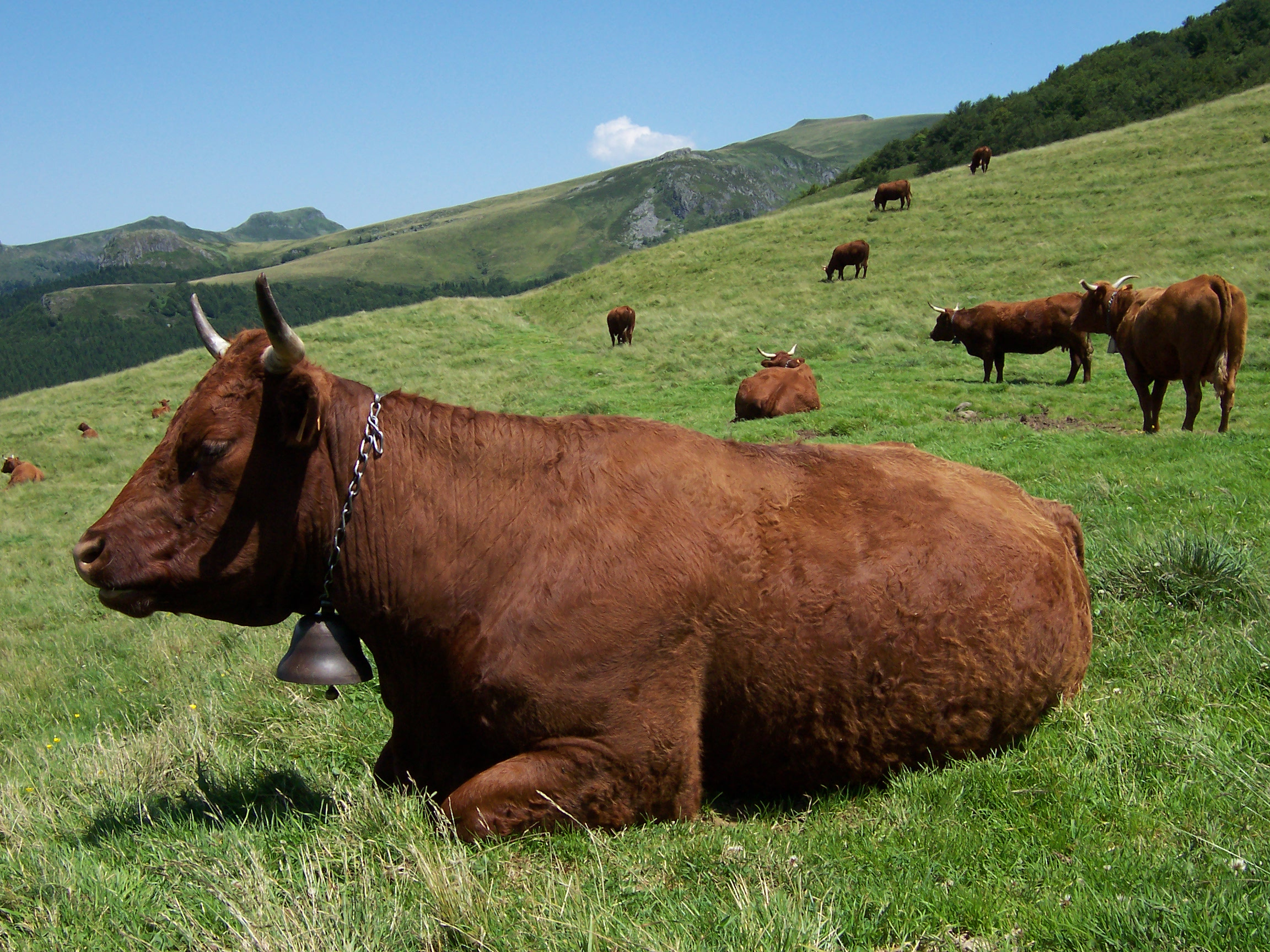
A Salers cow in Cantal pastures

The major part of the economy is concentrated in the agriculture and in particular cattle farming. The local breed of cattle is the Salers cattle, raised for its meat and for its milk (to make Cantal cheese and Salers cheese).

Besides this, there is a winter sports industry in le Lioran, the largest ski resort of the Massif Central.

== See also ==
- List of volcanoes in France
