= Puy Mary =

Mountain in central France

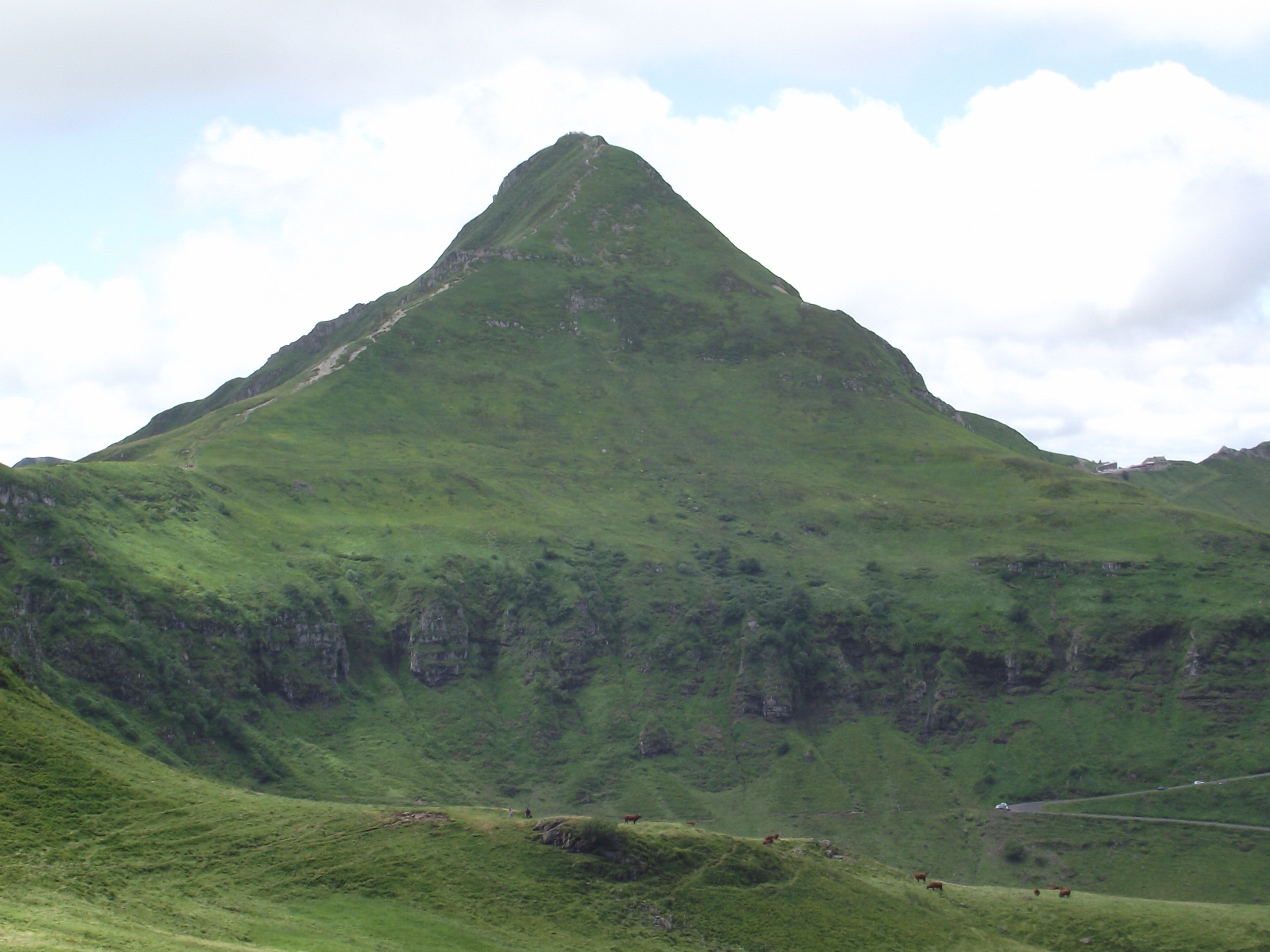

Highest point
- Elevation: 1,783 m (5,850 ft)
- Coordinates: 45°06′34″N 2°40′34″E

Geography
- Location within France
- Location: Cantal departement, France
- Parent range: Mounts of Cantal (Massif Central)

The Puy Mary is a summit in the mounts of Cantal in Massif Central in France. It is classified as a "Grand National Site" in France. Nearly 500,000 visitors come to this site every year.

== Geography and geology ==
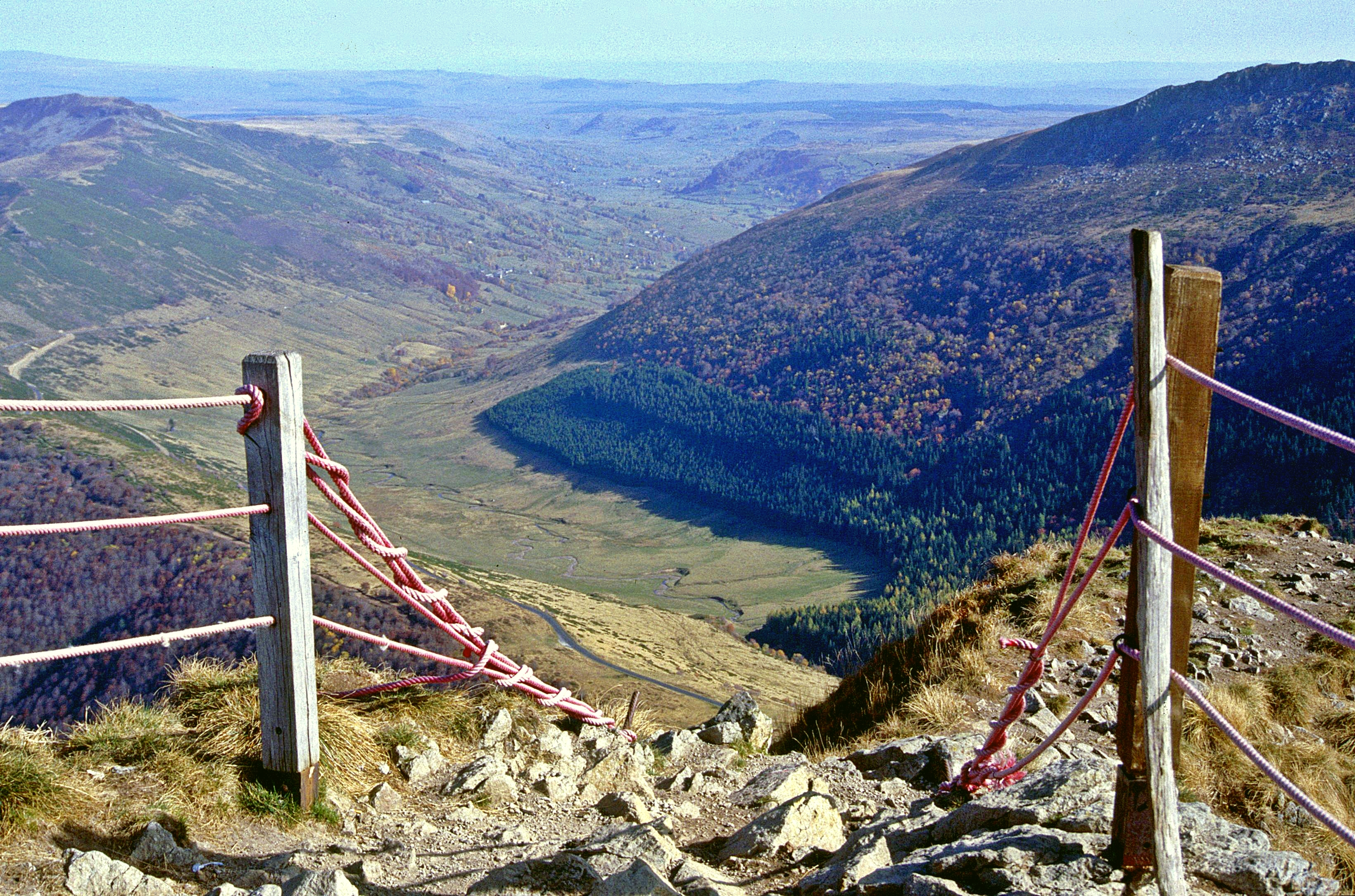
Glacial valley of Impradine seen from the top of the puy Mary

The mountain is an extinct volcano, about 6.5 million years old, which was formed by the accumulation of viscous lava (trachyte). It has been gradually eroded by glaciers during the Quaternary glaciation, which explains its pyramidal form. Seven glacial valleys radiate from the summit. It is accessible starting from the Pas de Peyrol, which at 1,589 m above sea level, is the highest pass of the Massif Central.

== Climate ==
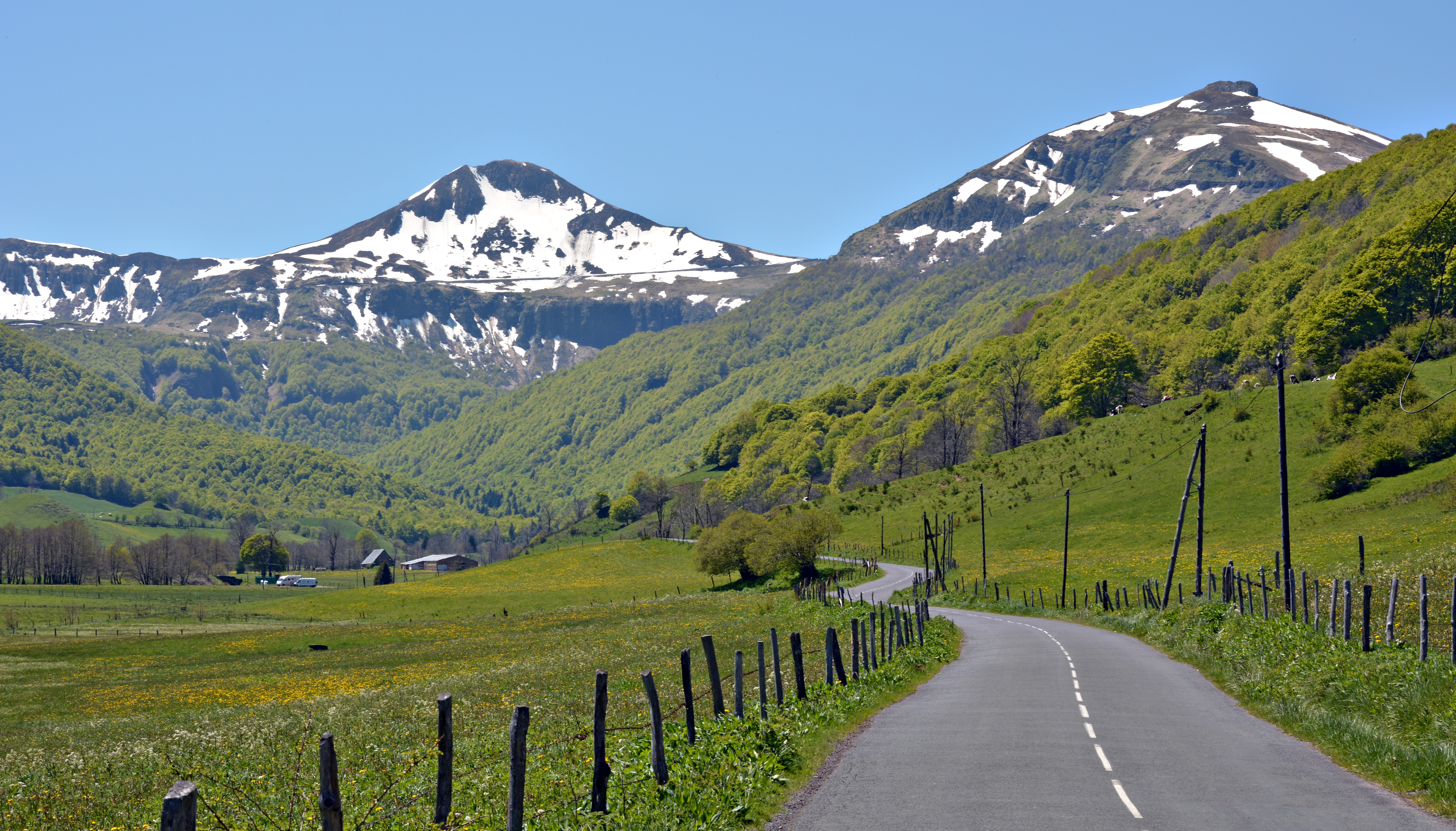
The Cheylade valley and the north face of the puy Mary.

First mountain met by the oceanic disturbances coming from the Atlantic Ocean, the Puy Mary is among the wettest places in France. In winter, snow is abundant.

== Flora ==
The subalpine stage of the Cantal mounts counts 550 plant species including 130 regarded as fragile (in these species, one counts 60 species which profit from a protection regional or national and 70 other not protected but rare). For example, one will rarely be able to find the following species of high mountain : the saxifrage with opposite leaves (Saxifraga oppositifolia), the saxifrage with Androsace leaves (Saxifraga androsacea), the verticillate pedicular (Pedicularis verticillata) or the saxifrage of Lamotte (Saxifraga exarata subsp lamottei), the latter being an endemic species of the Cantal and the monts Dore. The Puy Mary is a mountaintop where most of this flora can be observed.
