= Cantal =

Department in Auvergne-Rhône-Alpes, France

- Department of France
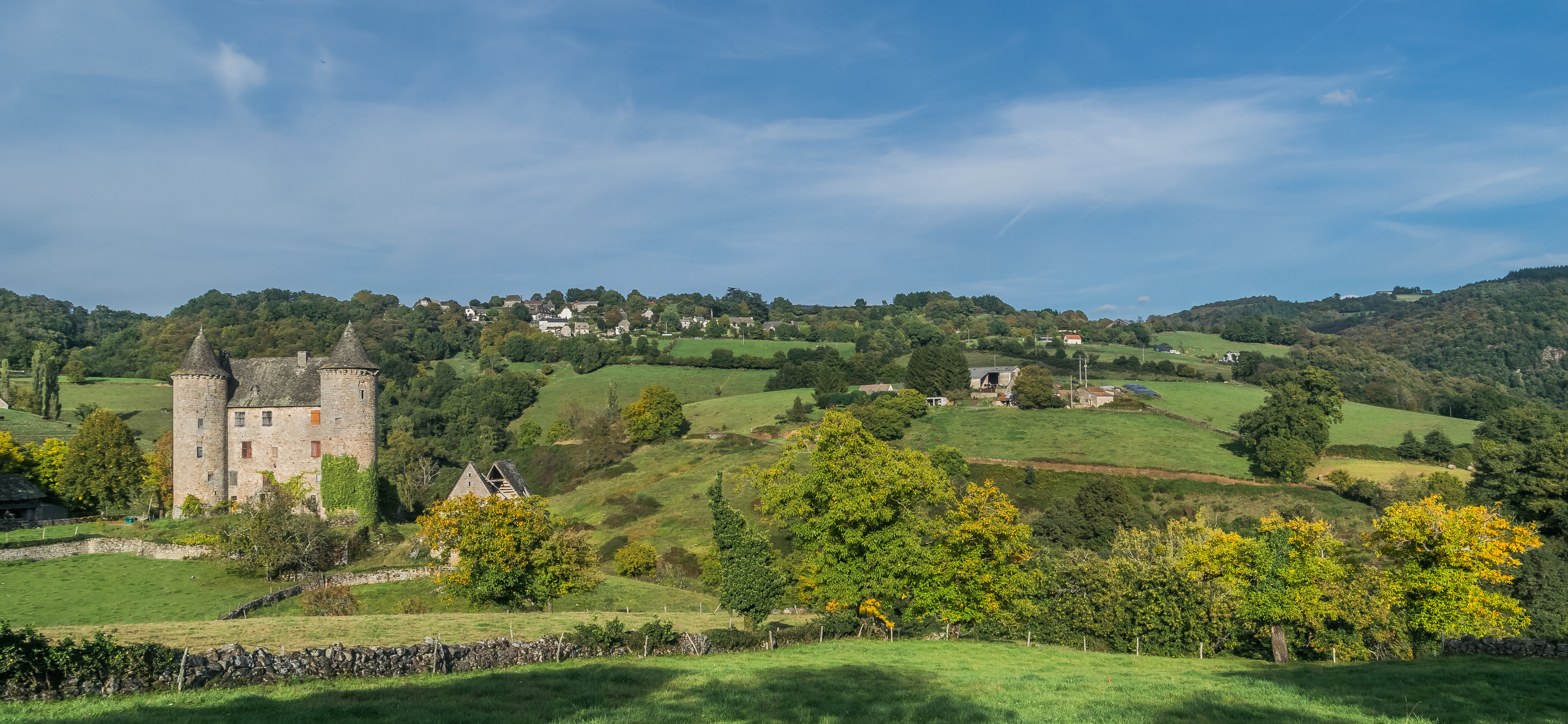
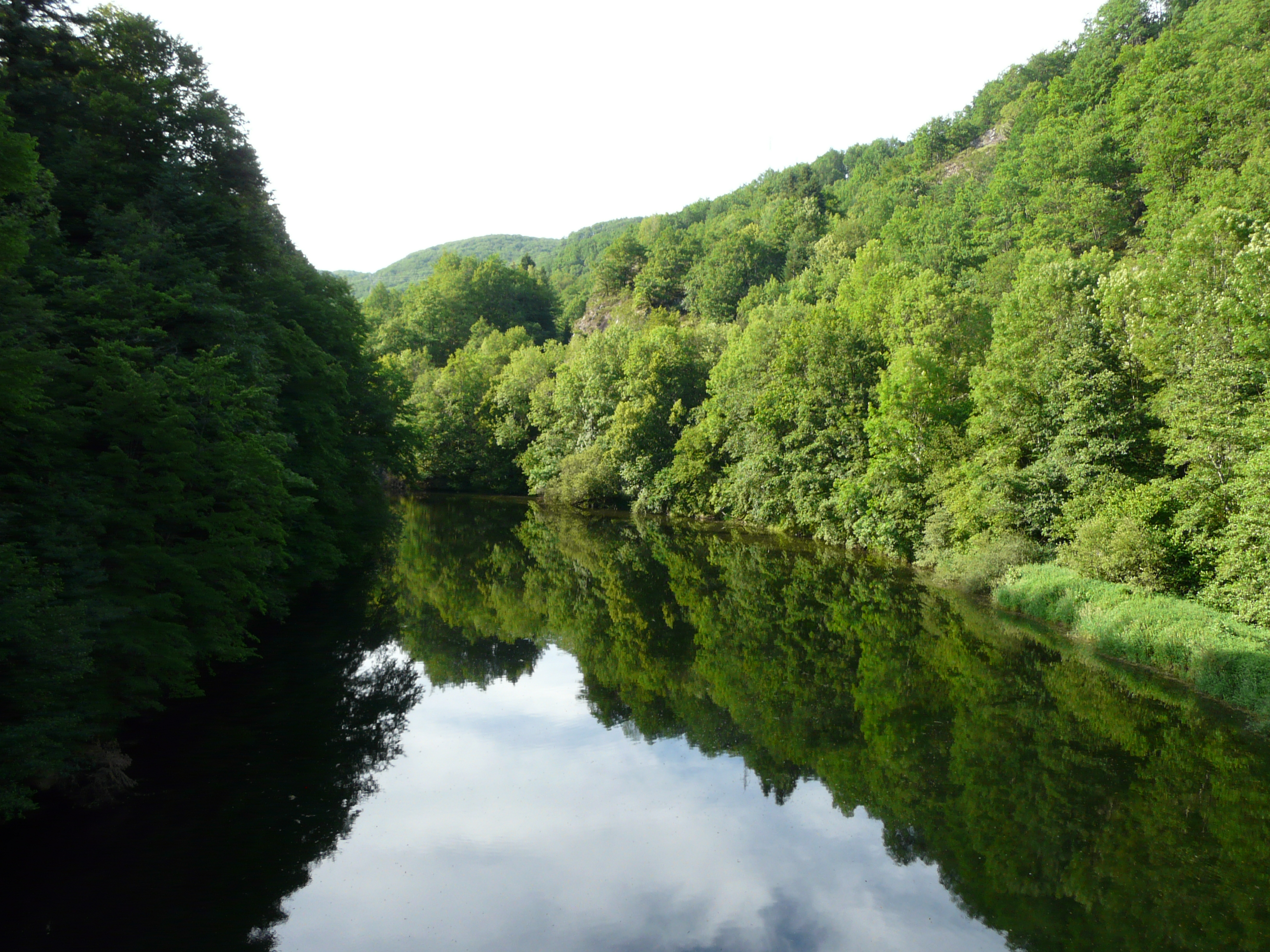
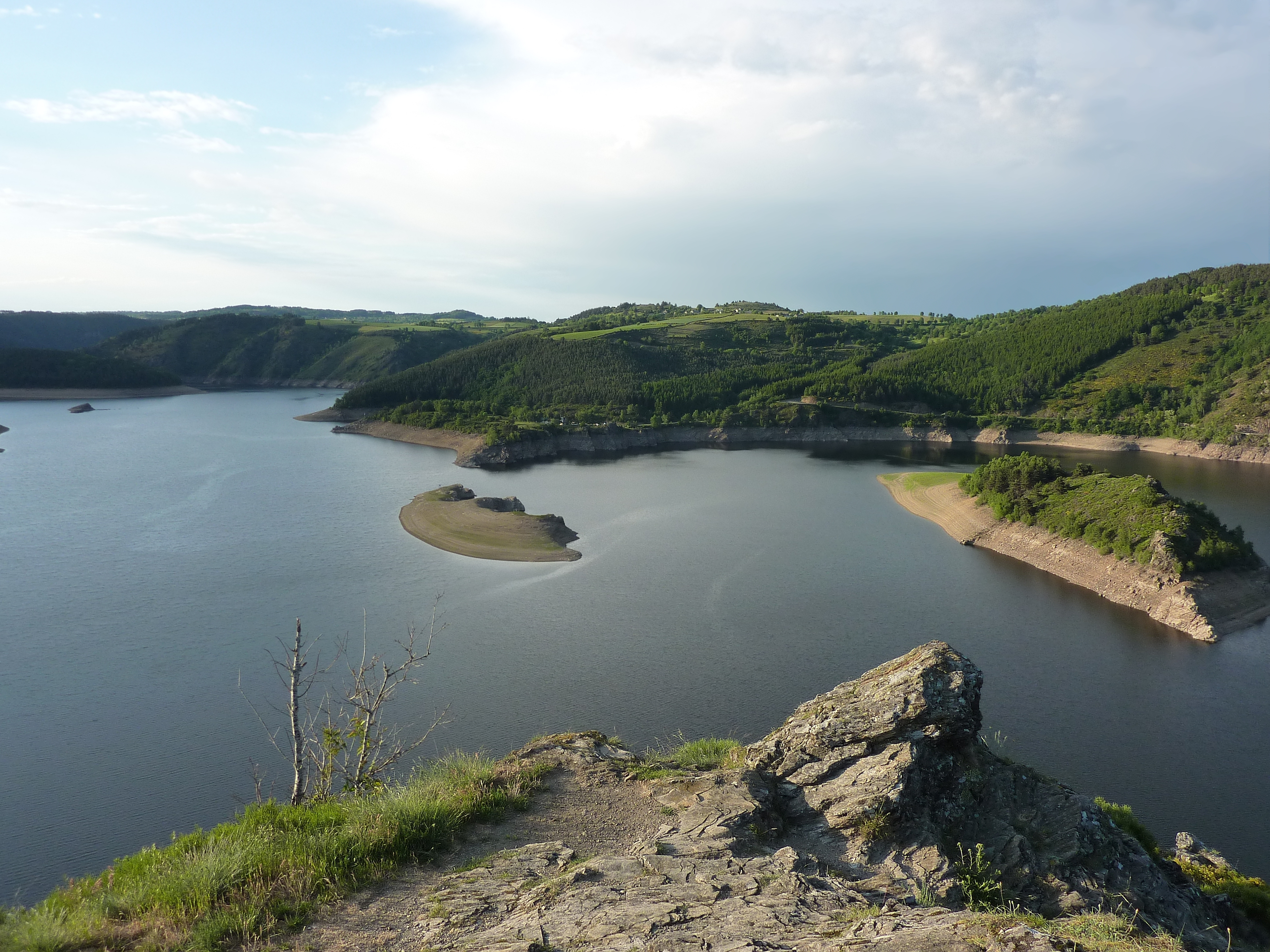
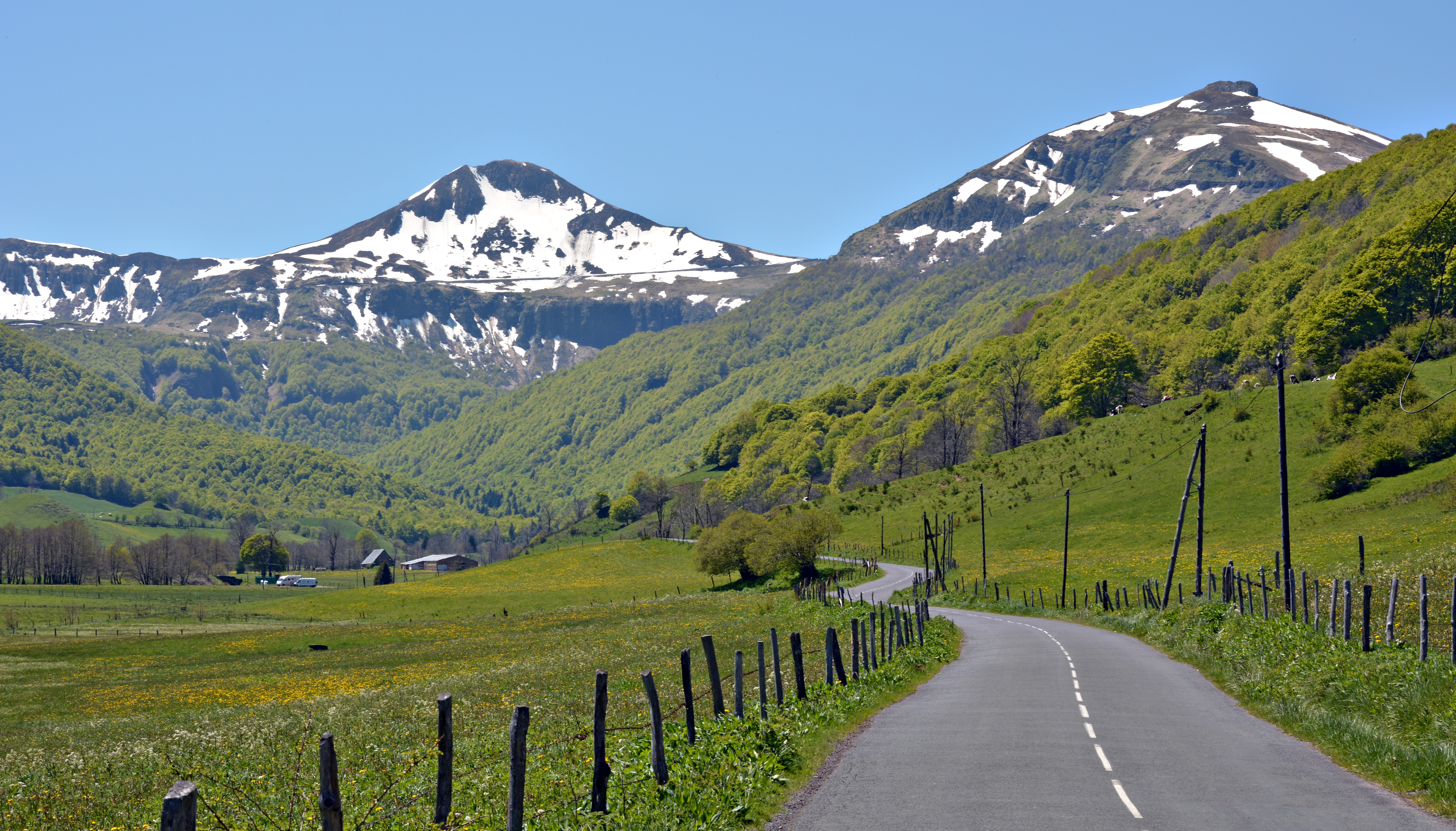
- From top down, left to right: Château de Réghaud in Sénezergues, Rhue River, Truyère River, Cheylade

- Flag Coat of arms

- Location of Cantal in France
- Coordinates: 45°2′N 3°6′E
- Country: France
- Region: Auvergne-Rhône-Alpes
- Prefecture: Aurillac
- Subprefectures: Mauriac; Saint-Flour

Government
  - President of the Departmental Council: Bruno Faure (LR)

Area^{1}
  - Total: 5,726 km^{2} (2,211 sq mi)

Population (2023)
  - Total: 144,196
  - Rank: 98th
  - Density: 25.18/km^{2} (65.22/sq mi)
- Time zone: UTC+1 (CET)
  - Summer (DST): UTC+2 (CEST)
- Department number: 15
- Arrondissements: 3
- Cantons: 15
- Communes: 250
- ^1 French Land Register data, which exclude estuaries and lakes, ponds and glaciers larger than 1 km^{2}

Cantal (French pronunciation: [kɑ̃tal]; Occitan: Cantal or Cantau) is a rural department in the Auvergne-Rhône-Alpes region of France, with its prefecture in Aurillac. Its other principal towns are Saint-Flour (the episcopal see) and Mauriac; its residents are known as Cantalians (French: Cantaliens / Cantaliennes or Cantalous / Cantaloues). Cantal borders the departments of Puy-de-Dôme, Haute-Loire, Aveyron, Lot, Lozère and Corrèze, in the Massif Central natural region.

Along with neighbouring Lozère and Creuse, Cantal is among the most sparsely populated and geographically isolated departments of France and Aurillac is the departmental capital farthest removed from a major motorway. It had a population of 144,196 in 2023, making it the country's fifth least populated department.

== Etymology ==
The department is named for the Plomb du Cantal, the central peak of the bare and rugged mounts of Cantal (French: Monts du Cantal) mountain chain which traverses the area.

== Geography ==
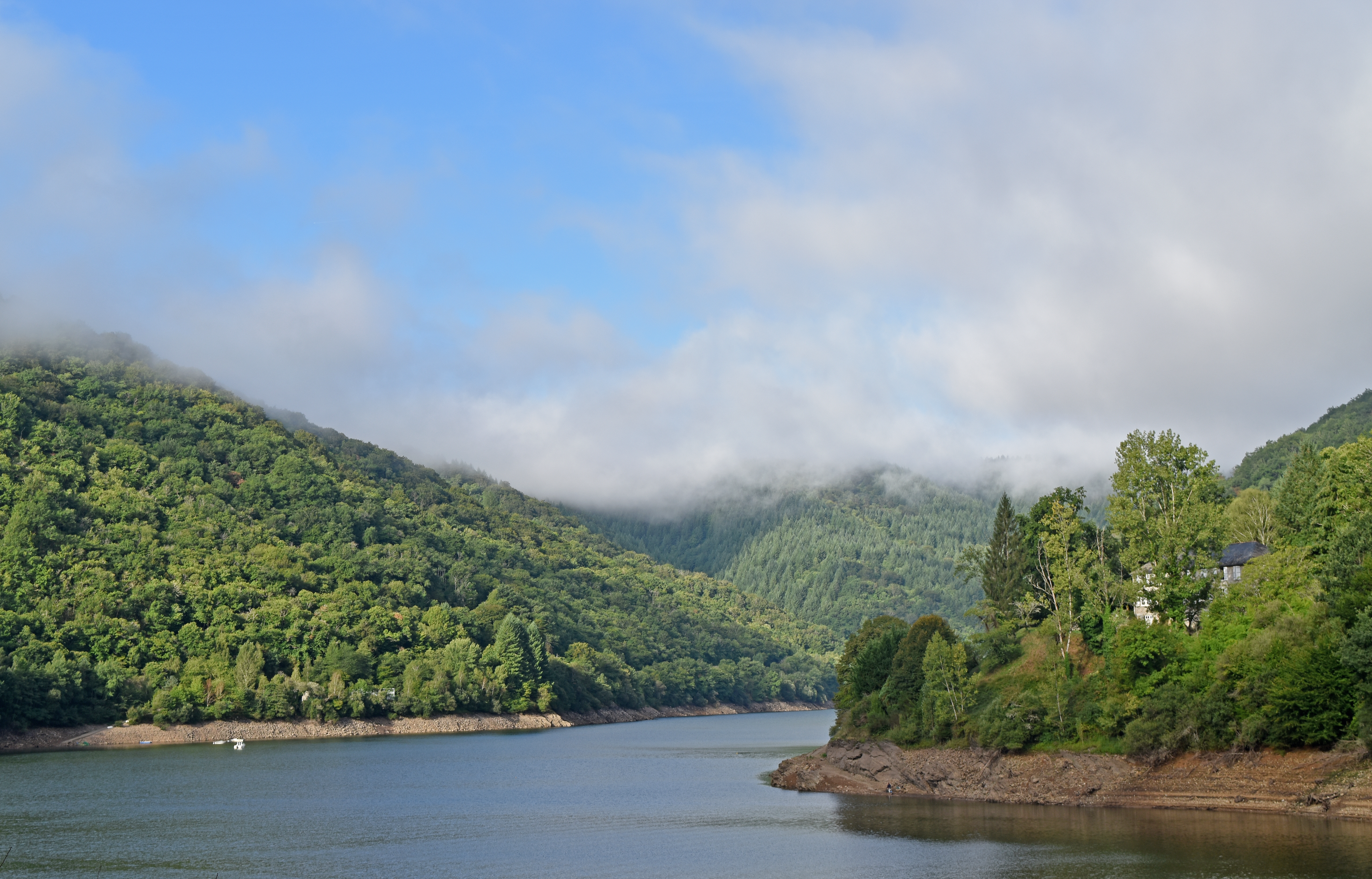
The Dordogne river in Cantal

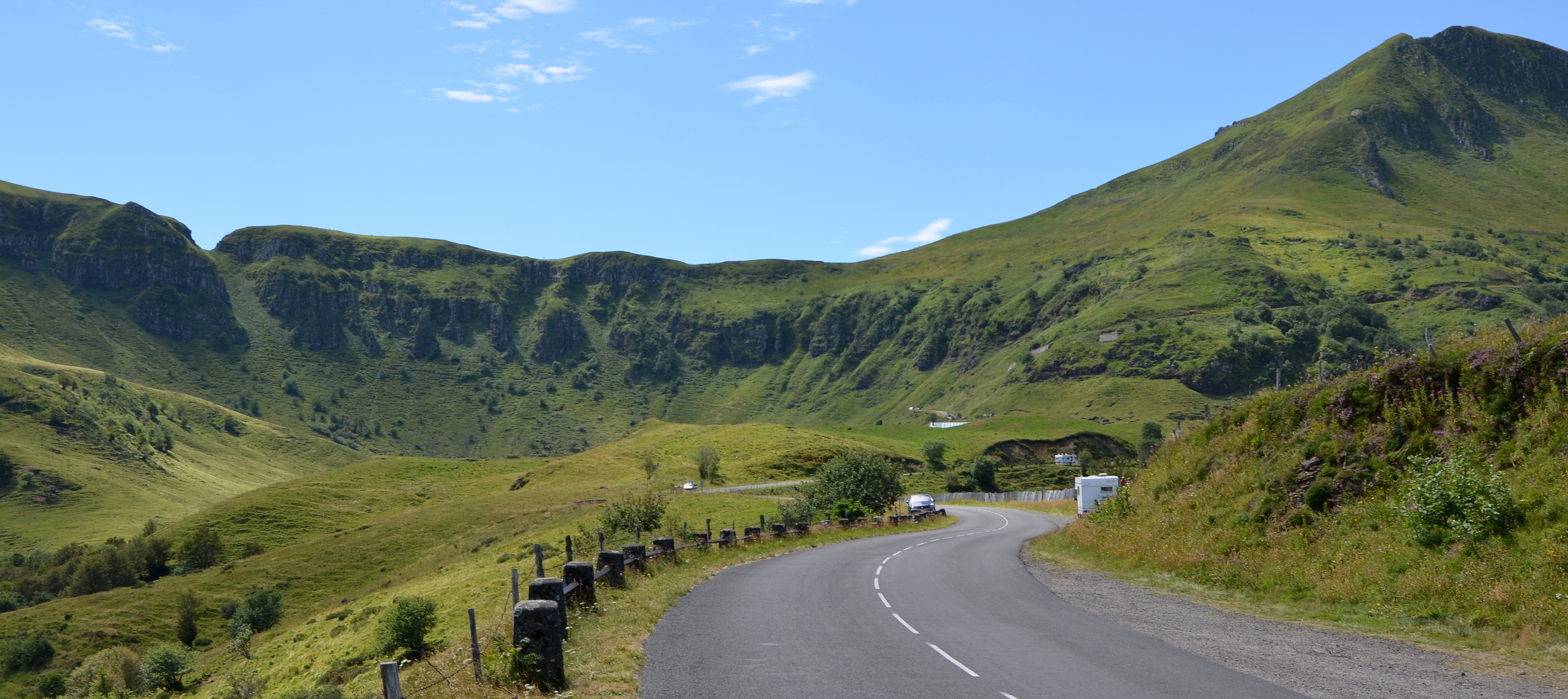
Pas de Peyrol

Cantal lies in the middle of France's central plateau. The Cantal range is a group of extinct and eroded volcanic peaks. Its highest point is the Plomb du Cantal, which reaches an elevation of 1,858 meters (6,096 ft). Its neighbors are Puy Mary (elev. 1,787 meters or 5,863 feet) and Puy Chavaroche (elev. 5,722 feet or 1,744 meters). To their north lie the Cézallier and Dore ranges and the arid Artense Plateau. Immediately to their east is the fertile Planèze Plateau, bound on its east by the Monts de la Margeride.

The principal rivers are the Alagnon, which is a tributary to the Allier; the Celle and Truyère, tributary to the Lot; and the Cère and Rhue, tributary to the Dordogne. At an elevation of 250 meters (820 ft) above sea level, the low point of the province lies in the Lot valley. The Truyère valley skirts the Planèze on the south and divides it from the Monts d'Aubrac, whose foothills include the thermal springs of Chaudes-Aigues. The western area of the department consists of grassy plateaus and river valleys.

At first, Cantal was divided into four arrondissements—Aurillac, Mauriac, Saint-Flour and Murat (later merged with Saint-Flour).

=== Climate ===
The climate of the department varies considerably. Prevailing winds and mountain ranges divide Cantal into four climatic zones:

- The west is subject to oceanic winds which bring rains.
- The Cantal and the Cézallier mountains create a rain shadow where it rains and snows quite often.
- The Planèze of Saint-Flour and the region of Massiac receive less precipitation, owing to winds coming from the north and south.
- The plateaus of the Margeride and the Aubrac have harsh winters and pleasant summers.

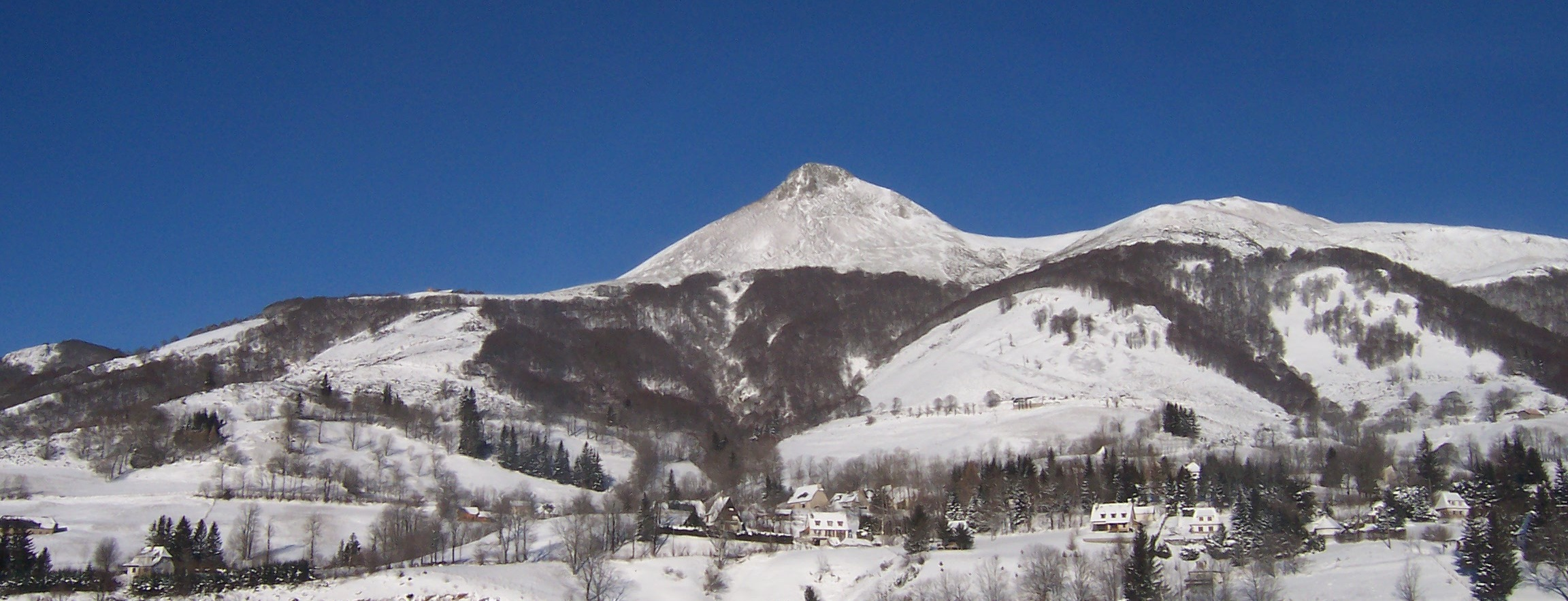
Puy Griou in the winter season

Generally, the weather is mild and dry in the alluvial plain between Murat and Saint-Flour and around Aurillac, while summer storms and winters can be long and severe in the northern and central areas. The west—nearer precipitation coming in from the Atlantic—is well watered. There is abundant snowfall which can remain up to six months on the mountaintops. Winter temperatures can fall to below −15 °C (5 °F), whereas in summer 25 °C (77 °F) is often reached. The southern part of the department, on its borders with Aveyron and Lot, is the hottest region. Aurillac averaged 2080 hours of sunlight per year over the period from 1991 to 2000. Fog is rare and disappears quickly. Wind is usually not very strong, but the lightning flashes in this department are among the most spectacular in France.

Televised French weather forecasts often note Aurillac as the coldest city in France in the mornings. This status should be understood in light of their derivation from temperature readings by Météo-France. Of the 30 cities included on its maps, Aurillac is by far the one with the highest altitude, at 640 m (2,100 ft) above sea level.

=== Principal towns ===
The most populous commune is Aurillac, the prefecture. As of 2023, there are 5 communes with more than 3,000 inhabitants:

Commune	Population (2023)
Aurillac	26,214
Saint-Flour	6,391
Arpajon-sur-Cère	6,361
Ytrac	4,339
Mauriac	3,449

== History ==
The area of Cantal was historically part of the Haute-Auvergne (Haute-Auvergne).

Cantal is one of the original 83 departments created during the French Revolution on 4 March 1790. Prior to the First World War, it comprised parts of the XIII. Army Corps military region and the Clermont-Ferrand educational division (académie).

=== Diocese of Cantal ===
After the 1790 Constitution Civile du Clergé, the Diocese of Saint-Flour in Cantal (whose bishop refused to swear the oath required by the Civil Constitution of the Clergy, constituting a schism from Rome) was among the almost half of the French sees being abolished to realign the new bishoprics to coincide with the new departments, such as Cantal, where outsider parish priest Anne-Alexandre-Marie Thibault was elected Bishop. It was formally abolished in turn after the Napoleonic Concordat of 1801 (Thibault refusing to resign) and replaced by the reinstated bishopric of Saint Flour, which however retained the departmental borders of Cantal.

== Economy ==
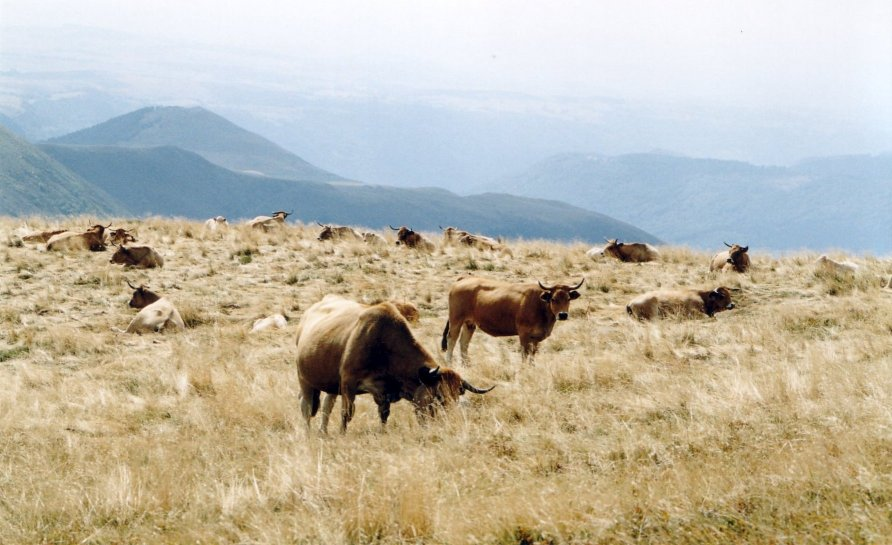
Aubrac cattle on the Plomb du Cantal

The climate being generally too cool and damp for grain, much of Cantal is given over to pasture for Aubrac and Salers cattle, sheep, and, formerly, horses. This in turn supports a dairy industry responsible for butter and Roquefort cheese (formerly) and the appellation-controlled cheeses Cantal, Salers, and Bleu d'Auvergne. Cantal is the French department with the greatest number of appellation-controlled cheeses, although proper Roquefort is now restricted to cheese produced in the Aveyron department. The region's mineral products include coal, copper, lead, iron, antimony, granite, slate and lime, but the department's isolation and poor infrastructure long precluded their exploitation. Before the First World War, the primary exports were livestock, cheese, butter, and coal and the main imports were coal, wine, grain, flour, and pottery. By then, it had been connected to both the Orleans and Midi railways.

Traditionally, many Cantalians roamed France during the year plying humble trades but now the area's relative lack of industry and development permits tourism. An area has been set aside as the Auvergne Volcanos Regional Park (Parc Regional des Volcans d’Auvergne).

== Demographics ==
The Occitan language was historically spoken in Cantal.

The population of Cantal peaked at 262,117 in 1836, and has been below 200,000 since the First World War. Like many of the country's rural departments, Cantal experienced a marked decrease in population throughout the twentieth century as agricultural wages failed to keep pace with those available in the industrialising regions. The department falls within the band of low-density population known as the empty diagonal.

Population development since 1791:

Historical population

Year	Pop.	±% p.a.
1791	239,972	—
1801	220,304	−0.85%
1806	251,436	+2.68%
1821	252,100	+0.02%
1831	258,594	+0.25%
1841	257,423	−0.05%
1851	253,329	−0.16%
1861	240,523	−0.52%
1872	231,867	−0.33%
1881	236,190	+0.21%
1891	239,601	+0.14%
1901	230,511	−0.39%
1911	223,361	−0.31%
1921	199,402	−1.13%

Year	Pop.	±% p.a.
1931	193,505	−0.30%
1936	190,888	−0.27%
1946	186,843	−0.21%
1954	177,065	−0.67%
1962	172,977	−0.29%
1968	169,330	−0.35%
1975	166,549	−0.24%
1982	162,838	−0.32%
1990	158,723	−0.32%
1999	150,778	−0.57%
2007	149,057	−0.14%
2012	147,415	−0.22%
2017	145,143	−0.31%
2023	144,196	−0.11%

== Tourism ==
=== Architecture ===
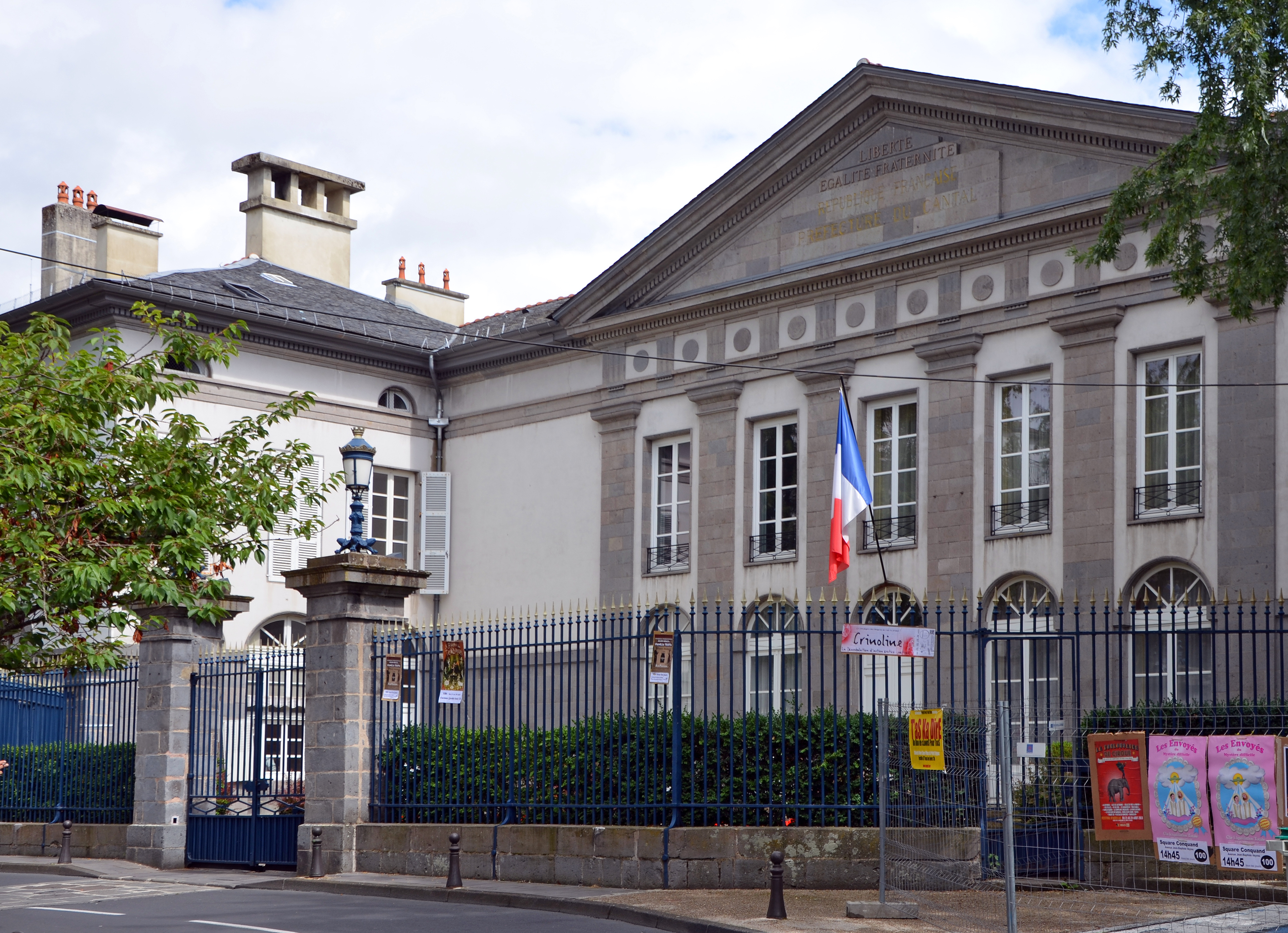
Hôtel de préfecture du Cantal

The department counts several remarkable buildings. Among them, the Romanesque religious buildings like the churches of Cheylade (eleventh century), Dieno or Massiac. The area's Catholic cathedral—dependent on the archdiocese of Bourges—is the 15th-century St Pierre de St-Flour, erected in the Gothic style.

- Castle of Val in Lanobre (36,500 visitors/year)
- Castle of Anjony in Tournemire (20,000 visitors/year)
- Castle of Pesteils in Polminhac (11,700 visitors/year)
- Castle de la Vigne in Ally (6,000 visitors/year)
- Castle of Clavières in Ayrens
- Castle of Carbonat in Arpajon-sur-Cère
- Chateau de Conros, near Aurillac

=== Festivals ===
- International Festival of Street Theatre, Aurillac.
- World Music Festival, Murat
- 36 hours : Various little scenes with dances
- Festival International de Boogie Woogie, Laroquebrou

=== Art ===
The characteristic folk dance in Cantal is La Bourrée. In the countryside it would be danced in folk costumes with accompaniment by accordion. The dance form was long ago adapted for use in courtly music and features prominently in the Baroque dance suites of the seventeenth and eighteenth centuries.

Prominent museums in Cantal include:

- Museum of Art and Arqueologia, Aurillac (34,100 visitors/year)
- The House of Fauna, Murat (23,500 visitors/year)
- Museum of the Géothermia, Chaudes-Aigues (20,600 visitors/year)
- Museum of the Volcanos, Aurillac (20,100 visitors/year)
- Museum of the ray, Marcenat (11,500 visitors/year)
- Museum of the "Haute Auvergne", Saint-Flour (11,100 visitors/year)
- The House of the Chestnut Mourjou (5,200 visitors/year)
- Museum of Georges Pompidou, Montboudif (3,500 visitors/year)
- Museum of the Accordion in Siran
- Museum of Agriculture in Auvernia, Coltines

=== Cuisine ===
The traditional articles of Cantalian cuisine were rye, buckwheat, and chestnuts, as well as ham, cheese, and vegetables. The area's simple recipes were designed to satisfy hill farmers and herders. Notable dishes include:

- Aligot (also in Aveyron): Creamed potatoes, cheese (fresh tomme), butter, fresh cream and a little garlic.
- Truffade: Potatoes in slices with cheese (fresh tomme) and a little garlic.
- Pounti: A cake made with dough of wheat black flour, herbs, lard, prunes and Swiss chard.
- The typical cheese Cantal, which can be chosen young, old or "entre-deux".

=== Outdoor activities ===
In the 19th century, the hills and valleys abounded with game and the streams with fish, the countryside producing a "vast variety" of aromatic and medicinal plants.

At present, the most visited places are Puy Mary, the Plomb du Cantal, the village of Salers, and the gorges of the Truyère (with the Garabit viaduct, the castle of Alleuze, and the towns of Boisset, Pierrefort). The Parc Naturel des Volcans d’Auvergne features several inactive volcanoes. Cantal also has numerous castles. Puy Mary can be accessed by car easily, and is accessible to hikers. It is also possible to hike to the nearby Puy de Peyre-Arse (1806 m). Le Lioran or Super-Lioran are the best places to start the hike. Le Lioran is accessible by rail or bus and Super-Lioran is just a kilometre away from Le Lioran. From Super-Lioran it is also possible to hike to Plomb du Cantal. There is also an option of taking the cable car to Plomb du Cantal from Super-Lioran. Super-Lioran tourist office has various hike routes in the region. There are also various adventure courses, dirt bikes, summer luges etc. that run in Super-Lioran.

Among the various activities offered in this department, the "Massif Cantalien" can be discovered through walking, horseback riding or mountain biking excursions (tracks are especially designed for this). Aquatic sports are also common, due to numerous lakes. The department also offers activities such as mountaineering, canoeing and fishing. The landscape also allows the practice of free flight: base jumpers frequent the sector around the Puy Mary and the Brezon valley.

Thanks to its terrain, Cantal can count on a good snow level, which allows winter sports. The station of Le Lioran, largest ski-resort of the Massif Central offers alpine skiing (with specific adaptations for snowboard) and ice-skating. Excursions in snow shoes are also possible. The department has several hundred kilometres of cross-country skiing tracks.

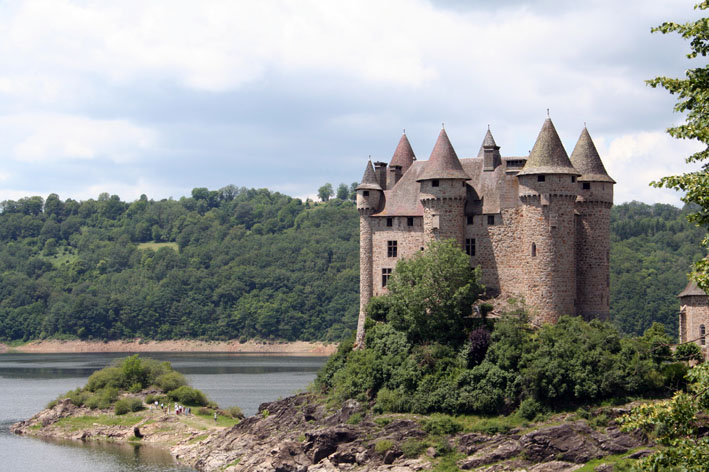
Château de Val

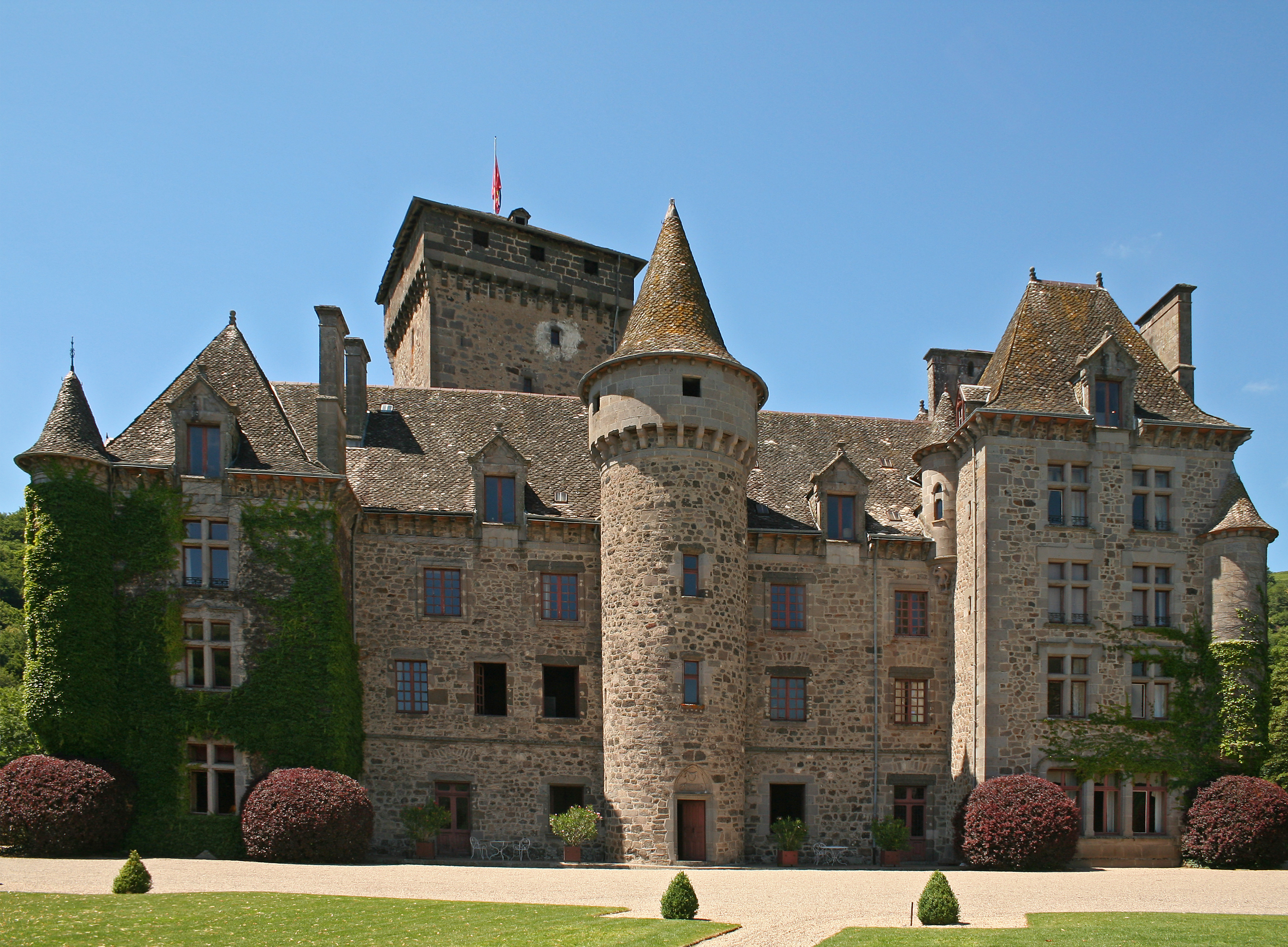
Château de Pesteils

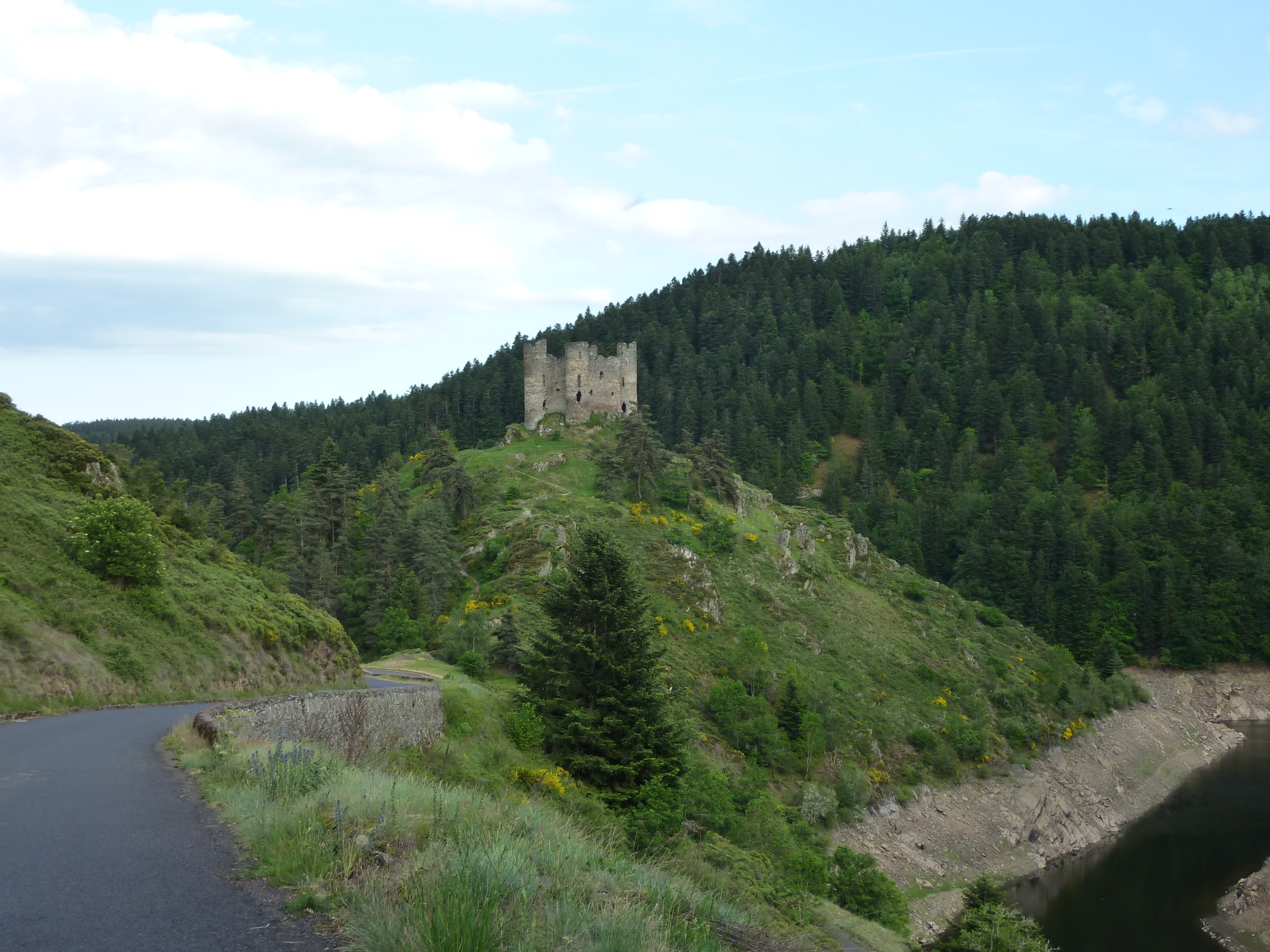
Truyère river and Château d'Alleuze

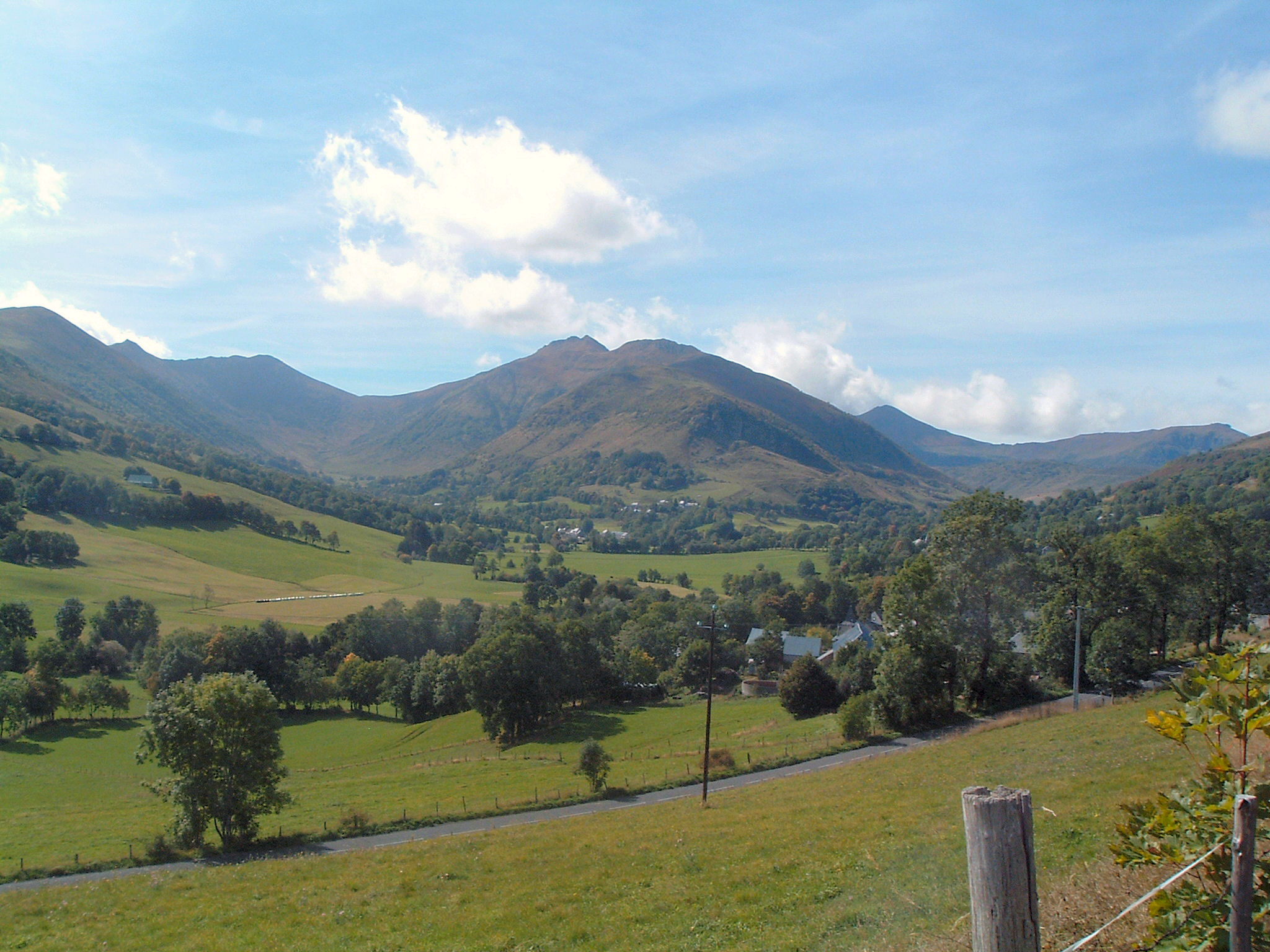
Lavigerie

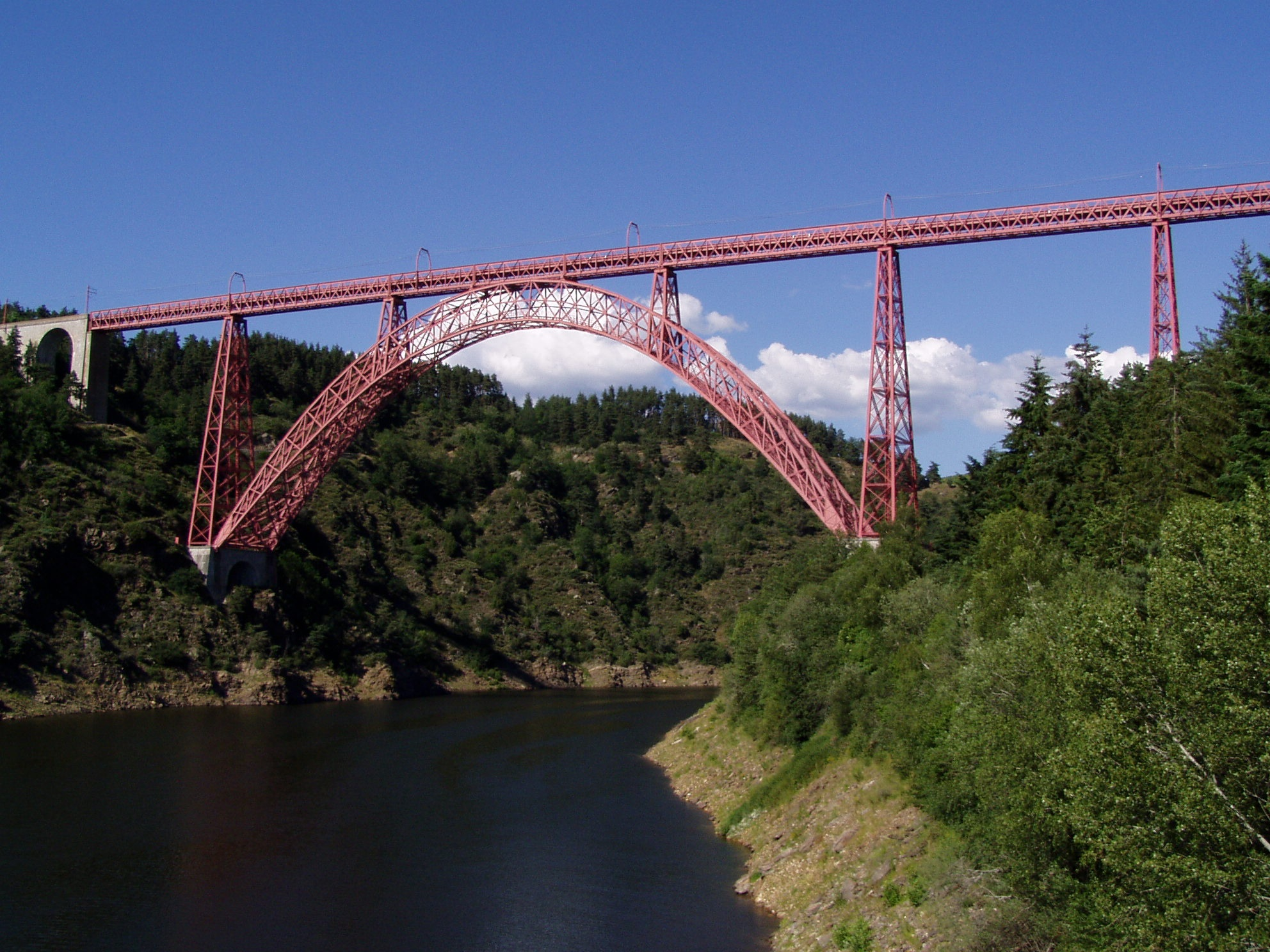
Railway bridge designed by Gustav Eiffel (Garabit viaduct)

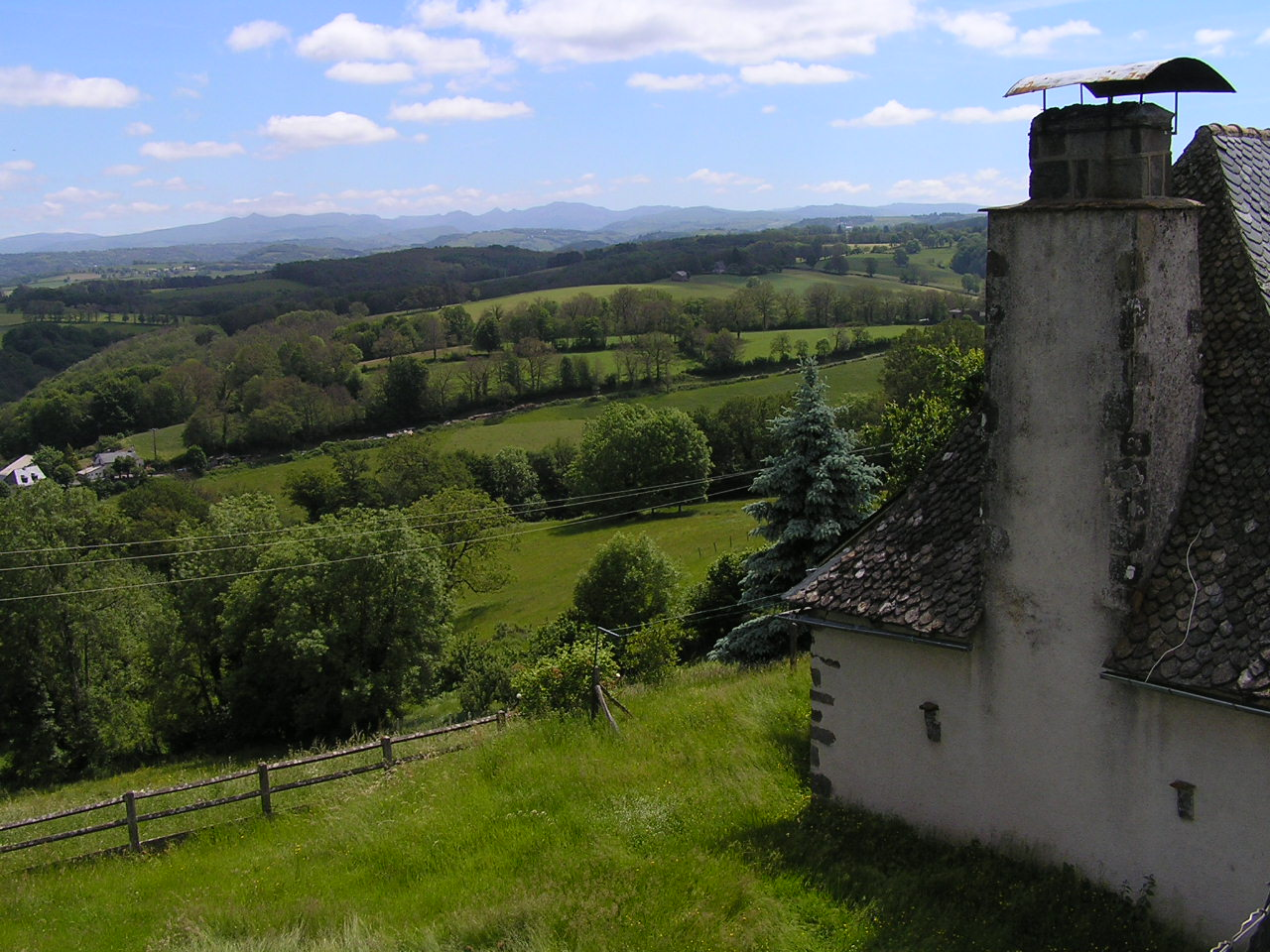
Cantal hills

== Politics ==
The current president of the departmental council is Bruno Faure (The Republicans).

Paul Doumer, French president from May 1931 to May 1932, was born in Aurillac in this department.

Party		seats
•	Union for a Popular Movement	13
	Socialist Party	5
•	Miscellaneous Right	5
	Miscellaneous Left	3
•	MoDem	1

=== Current National Assembly Representatives ===
Constituency	Member	Party
Cantal's 1st constituency	Vincent Descœur	The Republicans
Cantal's 2nd constituency	Jean-Yves Bony	The Republicans

== See also ==
- Communes of the Cantal department
