= Le Lioran =

Winter sports resort in France

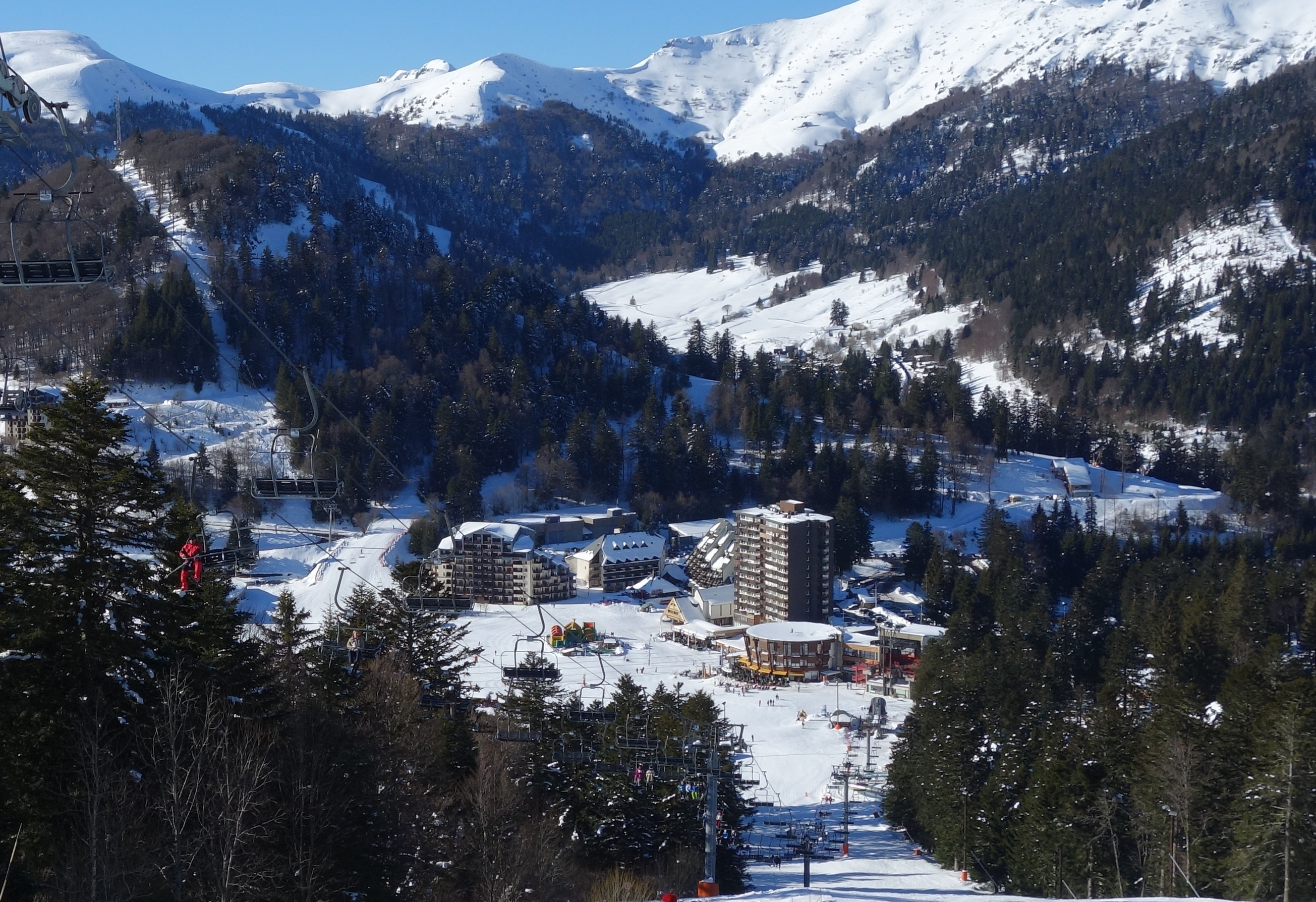
- Le Lioran ski station

- Location within France Location within Auvergne-Rhône-Alpes
- Location: Laveissière, Cantal, Auvergne-Rhône-Alpes, France
- Nearest city: Clermont-Ferrand
- Coordinates: 45.0459°N 2.45°E
- Vertical: 668 m (2,192 ft)
- Top elevation: 1,820 m (5,970 ft)
- Base elevation: 1,152 m (3,780 ft)
- Trails: 45 (downhill); 15 (cross-country)
- Total length: 60 km (37 mi) (downhill); 90 km (56 mi) (cross-country)
- Lift system: 19
- Lift capacity: 24,010 passengers/hr
- Snowmaking: 240 cannons
- Website: www.lelioran.com

Le Lioran is a small mountain resort in the heart of continental France. It consists of the original settlement of Le Lioran in the valley bottom as well as the settlements of Prairie de Sagnes, Font d'Alagon, Font de Cère, and Prat de Bouc, all of which are geared towards the mountain tourism market. The largest of these is the Prairie de Sagnes, now known as Super-Lioran; most facilities and accommodation are concentrated there. One of the few remaining resorts in central France, it has grown to become one of the biggest and most advanced resorts in the Massif Central. There is a wide range of sporting and leisure activities on offer in addition to the more traditional winter sports and the wealth of lodging and other services available. There is a heavy emphasis on the all year round nature of the resort, although, inevitably, the resort is busiest in the winter season.

== Geography ==
Within France it is administratively located in the commune of Laveissière, the canton of Murat, the arrondissement of Saint-Flour, the department of Cantal, and the region of Auvergne-Rhône-Alpes. However, the village of Prat de Bouc is located in the commune of Albepierre-Bredons, but shares the same upwards administrative chain as the other settlements.

=== Climate ===
Climate data for Le Lioran, 1,238 m (4,062 ft) (1991−2020 normals, 1977−2024 extremes)
Month	Jan	Feb	Mar	Apr	May	Jun	Jul	Aug	Sep	Oct	Nov	Dec	Year
Record high °C (°F)	14.2 (57.6)	17.0 (62.6)	19.3 (66.7)	23.2 (73.8)	27.4 (81.3)	34.3 (93.7)	33.0 (91.4)	31.9 (89.4)	29.0 (84.2)	26.8 (80.2)	20.2 (68.4)	16.0 (60.8)	34.3 (93.7)
Mean daily maximum °C (°F)	2.7 (36.9)	3.4 (38.1)	6.7 (44.1)	9.8 (49.6)	13.9 (57.0)	18.1 (64.6)	20.3 (68.5)	20.1 (68.2)	16.0 (60.8)	12.2 (54.0)	6.4 (43.5)	3.5 (38.3)	11.1 (52.0)
Daily mean °C (°F)	−0.3 (31.5)	−0.2 (31.6)	2.8 (37.0)	5.5 (41.9)	9.3 (48.7)	13.2 (55.8)	15.1 (59.2)	14.9 (58.8)	11.4 (52.5)	8.3 (46.9)	3.2 (37.8)	0.5 (32.9)	7.0 (44.6)
Mean daily minimum °C (°F)	−3.3 (26.1)	−3.8 (25.2)	−1.2 (29.8)	1.2 (34.2)	4.8 (40.6)	8.2 (46.8)	9.9 (49.8)	9.7 (49.5)	6.7 (44.1)	4.3 (39.7)	0.1 (32.2)	−2.4 (27.7)	2.9 (37.1)
Record low °C (°F)	−23.0 (−9.4)	−21.0 (−5.8)	−19.1 (−2.4)	−10.0 (14.0)	−6.0 (21.2)	−1.5 (29.3)	2.0 (35.6)	0.0 (32.0)	−1.0 (30.2)	−9.8 (14.4)	−14.0 (6.8)	−16.7 (1.9)	−23.0 (−9.4)
Average precipitation mm (inches)	218.3 (8.59)	184.3 (7.26)	179.1 (7.05)	170.4 (6.71)	163.4 (6.43)	130.1 (5.12)	115.6 (4.55)	122.2 (4.81)	156.2 (6.15)	185.5 (7.30)	248.7 (9.79)	255.3 (10.05)	2,129.1 (83.81)
Source: Meteociel

== History ==
The resort is among the newest within the Massif Central, with skiing appearing in the area around the beginning of the 20th century, although the area became forgotten during World War II. Afterwards interest in the sport in the area resurfaced, possibly owing to the influence of the British. The first lift to be constructed at the resort was the Téléski Débrayable de Massebœuf, a single place detachable button lift built by one of the residents in 1947. This lift continued to operate until 1984 when it was replaced by a three place fixed chair lift. The next lift to be built was the Téléski Débrayable de la Gare, built in 1965, to provide a link between the railway station in the valley bottom and Prairie de Sagnes further up the mountain, it is still running today.

As the end of the 1950s approached, Hector Peschaud, the sénateur and président of the conseil général at the time proposed the idea of constructing a resort on the site of Prairie de Sagnes. The department of Cantal put out a tender for architects and mountain developers to build a resort on the site. This prompted a major contributor to the development of the resort with the construction of the Téléphérique du Plomb du Cantal, an eighty place cable car, completed in 1967 with the aid of, and inaugurated by, locally born Georges Pompidou who would shortly succeed Charles de Gaulle as President of France. From then on, development at the resort snowballed.
