= Laveissière =

Commune in Auvergne-Rhône-Alpes, France

- Commune
- Location of Laveissière
- Location within France Location within Auvergne-Rhône-Alpes
- Coordinates: 45°07′00″N 2°48′25″E
- Country: France
- Region: Auvergne-Rhône-Alpes
- Department: Cantal
- Arrondissement: Saint-Flour
- Canton: Murat
- Intercommunality: Hautes Terres

Government
  - Mayor (2020–2026): Daniel Meissonnier
- Area^{1}: 34.93 km^{2} (13.49 sq mi)
- Elevation: 937 m (3,074 ft)
- Highest elevation: 1,811 m (5,942 ft)
- Lowest elevation: 894 m (2,933 ft)
- Population (2023): 537
  - Density: 15.4/km^{2} (39.8/sq mi)
- Time zone: UTC+01:00 (CET)
  - Summer (DST): UTC+02:00 (CEST)
- INSEE/Postal code: 15101 /15300
- ^{1} French Land Register data, which excludes lakes, ponds, glaciers > 1 km^{2} (0.386 sq mi or 247 acres) and river estuaries.

Laveissière (French pronunciation: [lavesjɛʁ]; Occitan: La Vaisseira) is a commune in the Cantal department in south-central France.

== Population ==
Historical population
Year	Pop.	±% p.a.
1968	526	—
1975	588	+1.60%
1982	623	+0.83%
1990	611	−0.24%
1999	586	−0.46%
2007	576	−0.21%
2012	565	−0.38%
2017	524	−1.50%
2023	537	+0.41%
Source: INSEE

== See also ==
- Communes of the Cantal department
