= Saint-Léger de Cheylade Church =

Church in Cheylade, France

- Église Saint-Léger de Cheylade
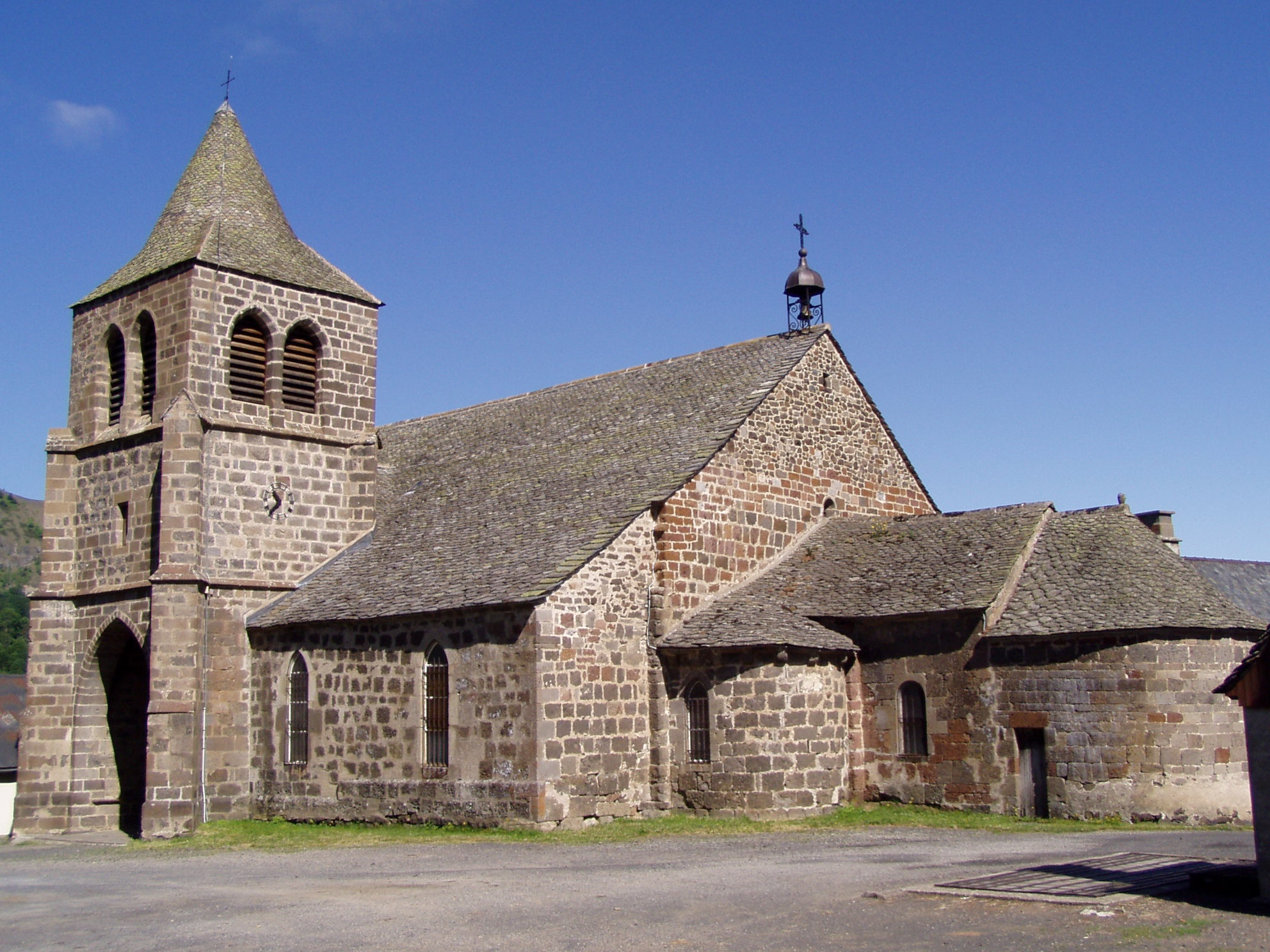
- Interactive map of Saint-Léger de Cheylade Church

General information
- Type: Church
- Architectural style: Romanesque architecture
- Location: Cheylade commune, Cantal department, Auvergne-Rhône-Alpes region, France
- Coordinates: 45°12′30″N 2°42′56″E
- Years built: 12th century, 15th century, 17th century
- Owner: Municipality of the Cheylade commune
- Awards and prizes: Monument historique (1936)
- Designations: Adscribed to the Roman Catholic Diocese of Saint-Flour jurisdiction from the Catholic Church confession

The Saint-Léger de Cheylade Church, in Cheylade, a small French commune of the Auvergne-Rhône-Alpes region, is a Romanesque religious edifice erected in the 11th century, ruined during the Hundred Years' War, rebuilt and remodeled several times between the 15th and 17th centuries, and touched up again in the 19th century.

Consecrated to Leodegar of Poitiers and dedicated to Catholic worship, the church long belonged to the diocese of Clermont, but since the French Revolution has been under the diocese of Saint-Flour.

Modest in design and size, like many of the region's churches it is built of volcanic rock, with a slate roof. Although the interior is almost devoid of sculpted ornamentation and features few remarkable works of art or furnishings, it is distinguished by a highly original wooden coffered ceiling: 1,360 squares probably painted in the 18th century with polychrome motifs, simple in style but imbued with Christian symbols. It was these paintings, done on the three vaults by an anonymous artist, that enabled the church to be listed as a historic monument in 1963.

== History ==
The history of the Saint-Léger church in Cheylade remains shrouded in uncertainty, despite some research, of which the 2004 booklet published by the Valrhue association (Note: Association for the discovery of the natural and cultural heritage of the Petite Rhue valley) offers the most recent assessment.

=== From primitive church to Romanesque building ===
While the existence of an earlier Christian church in Cheylade is well documented, the Romanesque building itself has been dated with some certainty to the early 11th century.

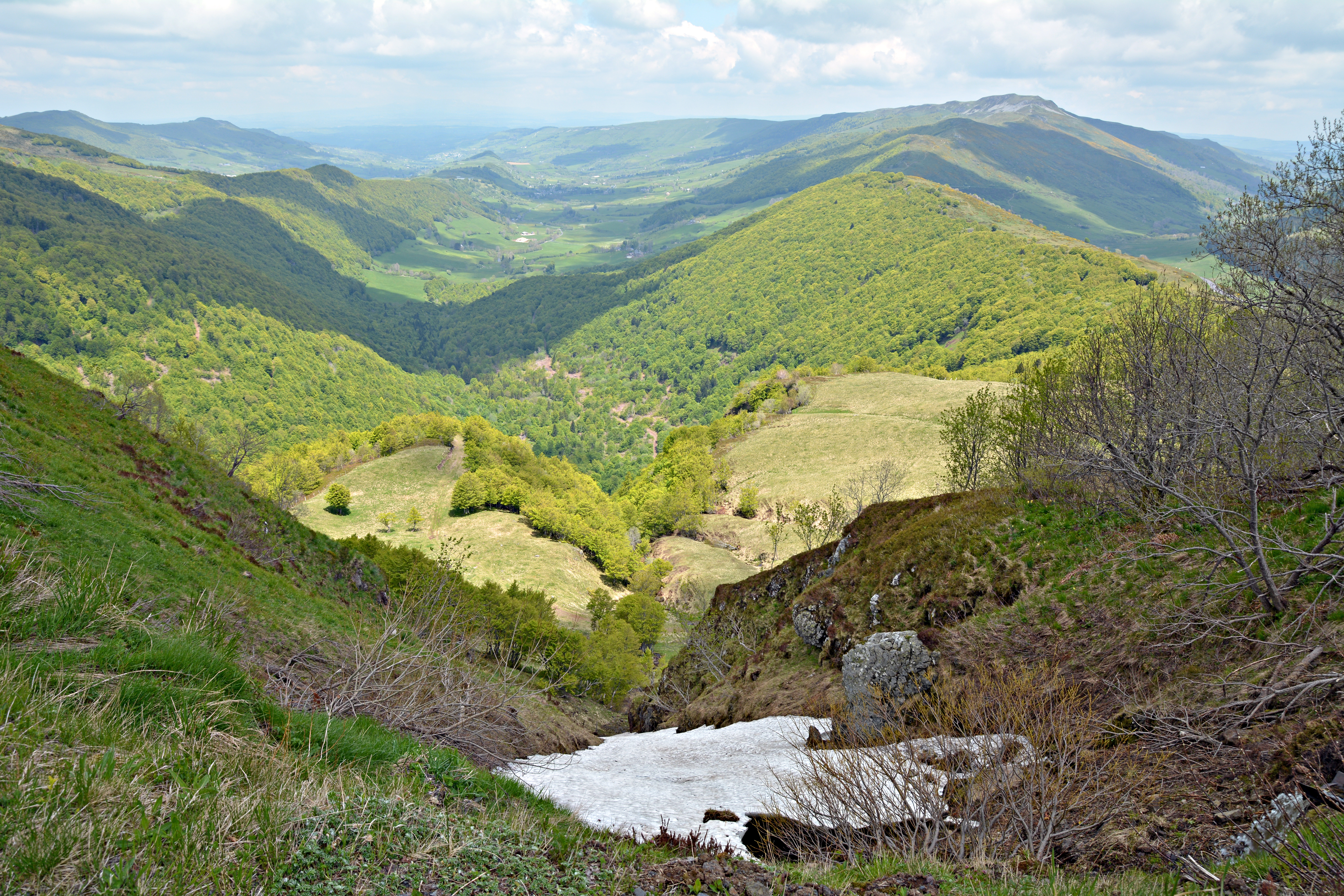
Cheylade valley seen from the Puy Mary road.

The Christianization of Gaul spread to Auvergne, presumably thanks to Austromoine de Clermont, around the 2nd and 4th centuries. The Cheylade valley is mentioned in the forged charters from around the 11th century, in which Theodechilde, granddaughter of Clovis, was supposed to have settled a dispute between the priory of Mauriac and the abbey of Saint-Pierre-le-Vif in Sens, five centuries earlier: a village certainly existed there in the 11th century, but there's no evidence that this remote area had already benefited from a place of worship.

By the 9th century, however, the conditions appeared to be right: the sparse population of the Petite Rhue valley had grown sufficiently to justify a parish church in the eyes of the bishopric, and the lords of "Chaszlada", (Note: From the Old Occitan "Chaslada" ("Chailada" in modern Occitan), from the Low Latin "Castellata": with a castle or fortified house.) from the powerful Nonette family, had the means to finance its construction. The existence of a church in Cheylade around the year 900 seems to be confirmed by the Sauxillanges cartulary: it includes a copy of the deed by which the knight Étienne 1er donated the church of Cheylade and "everything visibly connected with it", which he had inherited from his father and then passed on to his sons, who confirmed the donation, to this Cluniac abbey when he became a monk there in 1029. Dedicated to the martyred bishop Saint Léger, no doubt because of his fame in the region, (Note: The saint's relics crossed the Haute-Auvergne region when they were transferred from Noirmoutier to Ébreuil.) this first building appears to have quickly become too small.

Little is known about the history of the Romanesque church that replaced it. It was built, if not at the crossroads of the 11th and 12th centuries, at least at the beginning of the latter, when the lords of Cheylade gained the title of Comptours de Valrus. Built from the valley's volcanic rock, it probably consisted of a central nave, two quarter-circle-vaulted side aisles, and a choir flanked by two non-communicating apsidioles: Opened before the end of the medieval period, these semi-dome apsidioles, together with the slightly broken barrel-vaulted choir typical of the Mauriac district, the apse and its rectangular chevet, a few interlacing and corded capitals and part of the north wall, make up what remains of the 11th century.

=== Destructions and reconstructions ===
In addition to natural deterioration, Cheylade's Romanesque church has suffered from a troubled historical context, resulting in several restorations and architectural additions.

Right up until the end of the 14th century, in the midst of the Hundred Years' War and despite the Treaty of Brétigny, English armed bands scoured the Auvergne, occupying the Petite Rhue valley as early as 1357. Local feudal conflicts, as well as the ravages of cholera and the Black Death, added to this insecurity, which benefited the exactions of other plunderers: around 1359–1360, the church was badly damaged.

Hypotheses concerning its restoration are divergent, but not irreconcilable. Either the church remained in ruins after the English raids, or it underwent repairs, which could be indicated by the fact that in 1368, two lords of the valley asked John, Duke of Berry for authorization to affix their shields to it: in any case, the Treaty of Brétigny was not enough to stem the chaos in the region, and it was only a century later, thanks to economic and demographic recovery, that it was enlarged, if not raised.

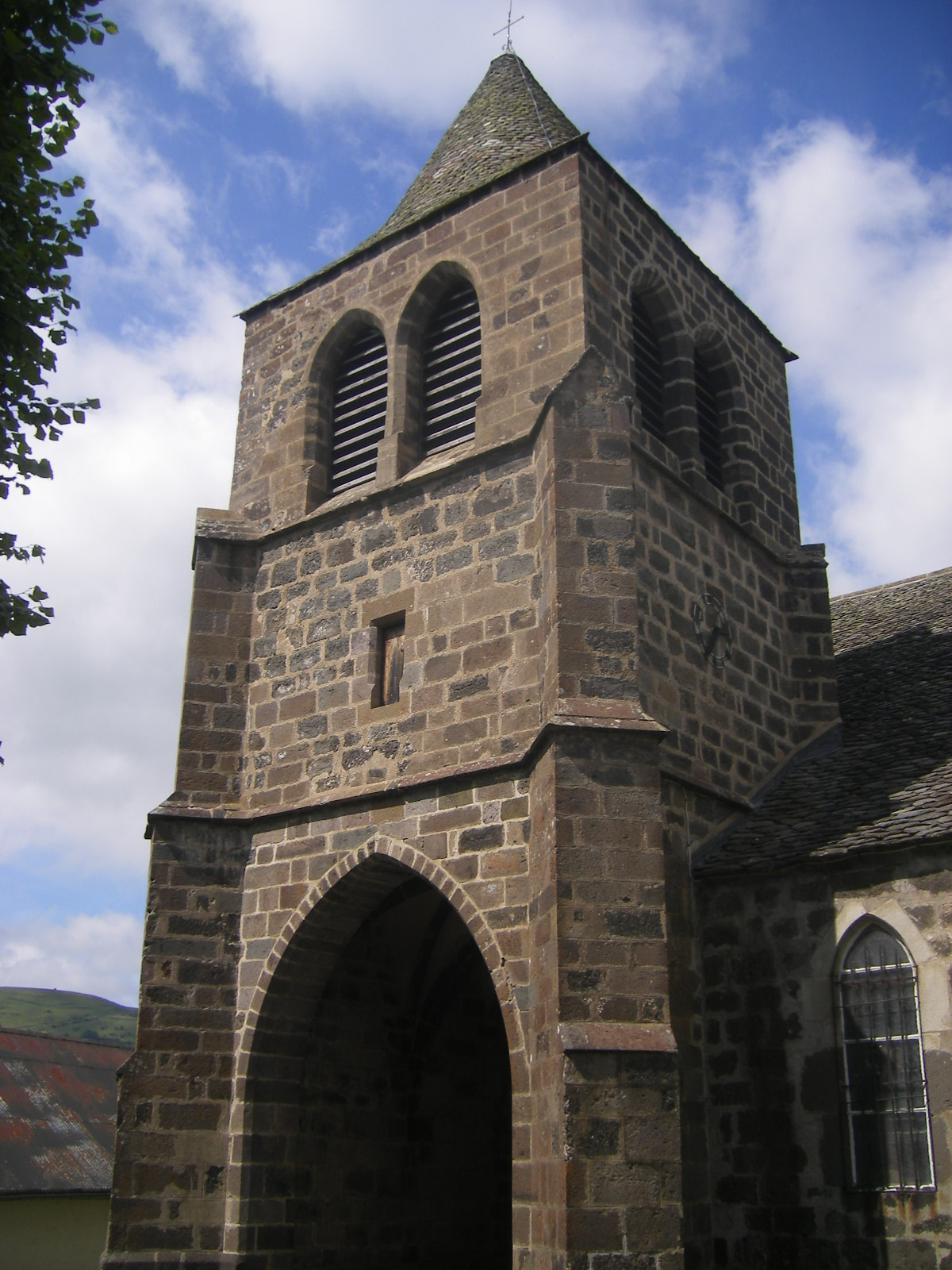
The 15th-century bell tower.

Reconstruction in the 15th century included four rib-vaulted side chapels and a porch on the south side, supporting a square bell tower served at the time by a spiral staircase cut into the wall; lined with two stone benches forming a single unit with its side walls, this porch must have served as a "common house". With no money to rebuild the nave and aisles under a stone vault, the timber roof truss remained visible. It caught fire a century later, either accidentally or as a result of the Wars of Religion, prompting a much more extensive restoration campaign at the turn of the 16th and 17th centuries – a sign of renewed prosperity.

A renowned architect active in Auvergne, Pierre Levesville, was called in: Contracts signed with the Toulouse notary Parrouton prove that he supervised the work from May 11, 1610, to March 27, 1614, directing the stonemasons himself but delegating a certain Jean Tardieu, master mason, to oversee the supply of stones, sand, lime and flagstones. The names of those who commissioned the work are unknown, as are the exact nature and scope of the work, apart from the creation of four pillars separating the nave from the aisles, and the repair of the roof, framework, and vault. The latter is entirely paneled in fir wood, using one-inch-thick, toise-long staves divided by 33 × 33 cm square moldings.

Regarding the decoration of the coffering, Louis Baritou, whose historical monograph devotes little space to the church, believes they are contemporary with these major 17th-century works, citing ceilings of the same type found in the Maison Consulaire in Montauban and the Chapelle des Pénitents Bleus in Toulouse, also by Levesville. Michel Maronne and Antoine de Rochemonteix, on the other hand, assert that the panelling was first coated with a uniform light paint, and that it was painted much later, by an unknown artist, probably Italian. Popular memory and nineteenth-century documents place his intervention around 1740, based on an inscription -"finis opus 1743" (Note: "Completion: 1743.)- which would have been covered up in 1884: that year, in fact, the construction of two false towers and a tribune in the west end of the church caused dozens of the original 1,428 caissons to disappear.

Between 1834 and 1866, the sacristy, which may have adjoined the chevet to the north, was built behind it on the east side.

In his monograph on the churches of Haute-Auvergne, Adolphe de Chalvet de Rochemonteix concludes that, in the course of a turbulent history that obliged its inhabitants to rebuild it each time in the taste of the moment, Saint-Léger de Cheylade was influenced "by the Auvergne school, mitigated by the Limousin style" for its barely broken vaults, and by the more distant Velay school, through the arcatures linking the choir to the apsidioles. (Note: Although not mentioned by any author, not even him, photographs taken by Adolphe de Rochemonteix before 1902 seem to attest that the church's walls and arcades were painted with colorful arabesques and motifs in the 19th century.)

=== Saint-Léger and its parish ===
Originally part of the diocese of Auvergne, the parish of Cheylade was successively attached to that of Clermont and then Saint-Flour.

In the 14th century, the parish became part of the archpriesthood of Ardes, in the archdeaconry of Saint-Flour. In the 13th century, the church and lordship of Valrus, ceded at an unknown date by the abbey of Sauxillanges, became the personal property of the bishops of Clermont. When the diocese of Auvergne was divided in 1317, Cheylade became part of the diocese of Clermont, (Note: Louis Baritou suggests that the Comtors de Valrus paid homage to the Bishops of Clermont in order to escape the direct suzerainty of the Duke of Poitiers, brother of Louis XI.) like all the other surrounding parishes. Until the French Revolution, Cheylade belonged to this bishopric, while the land of Valrus, sold in 1592 by bishop François de La Rochefoucauld, (Note: He sold all the bishopric's rights to the land and seigneury of Cheylade to a nephew of the d'Estaing family.) had various owners before being seized as national property.

During the French Revolution, Cheylade's church may have suffered some damage, and was certainly closed for a few years, especially as its parish priest seems to have recanted his oath to the Civil Constitution of the Clergy. Following a decree in 1791, the four bells were taken to Murat for casting, and the belfry only received three new ones around 1830. In 1790, with the creation of the French departements, the church and parish were definitively attached to the diocese of Saint-Flour. (Note: It is now part of the Saint-Luc du Nord-Cantal parish, belonging to the Mauriac deanery, in a diocese that corresponds exactly to the département) The age-old custom of depositing provisions in front of the presbytery on the eve of Saint Léger's feast day, so that he could grant the community's wishes, was still attested to in the mid-19th century by Henri Durif.

== The present-day church ==
=== External appearance ===
With the exception of the sacristy, the exterior of Saint-Léger is more or less as it was when restored in the 17th century.

Now off-center on the western edge of the "balcony village" of Cheylade, the church overlooks the valley and, like many others in Auvergne, has a short, squat silhouette: its eight-bay bell tower, topped by a low, four-sided spire, towers just above it. The edifice is built entirely of rhyolite, a volcanic rock whose color varies from gray to pinkish beige, while the steep roofs are covered with phonolite flagstones, a igneous rock with an almost crystalline sound.

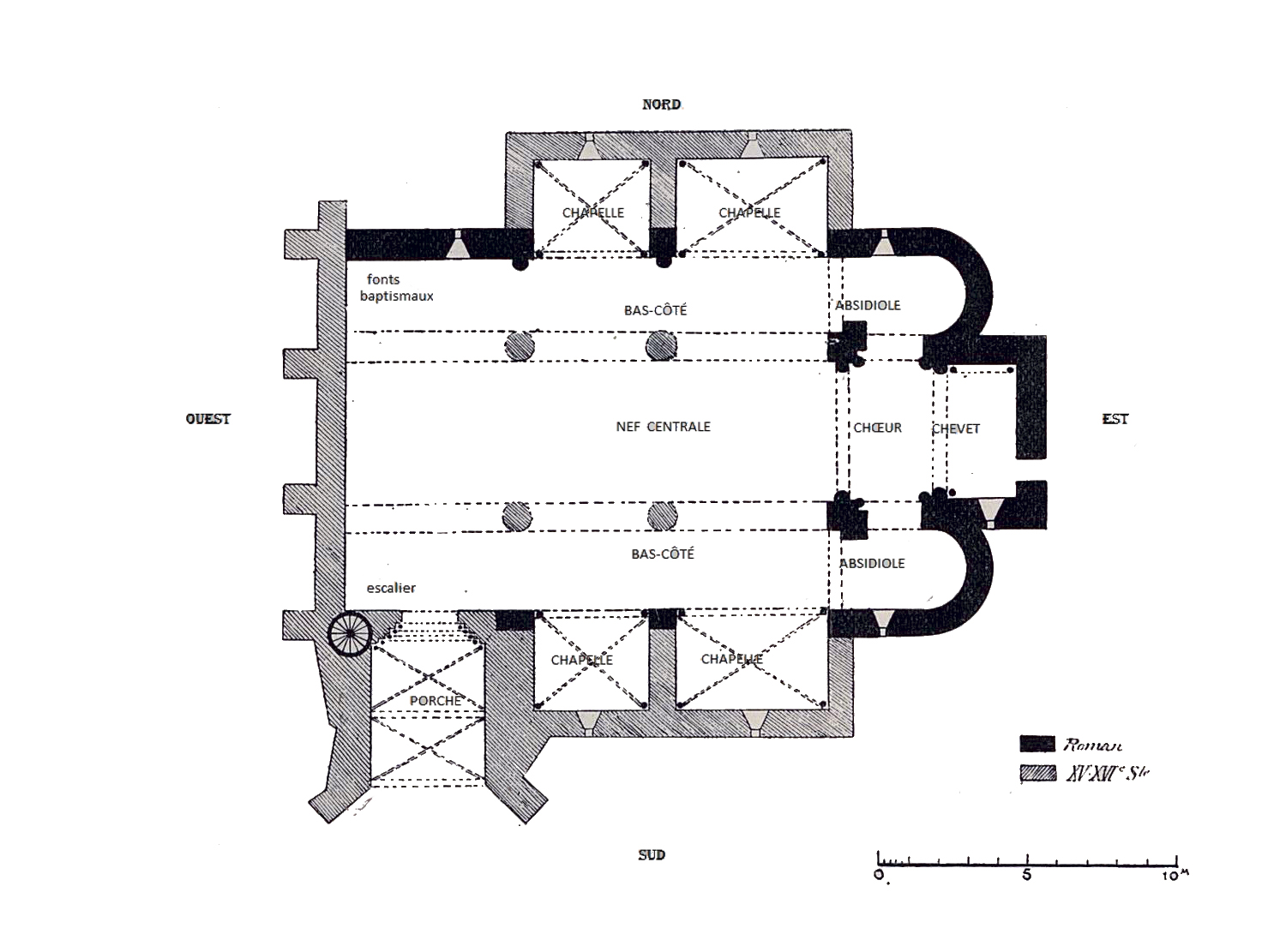
Plan showing the various parts of Saint-Léger church at the time. (Note: Plan drawn up by Adolphe de Rochemonteix in 1902. It does not include the 19th-century additions: the rounded sacristy behind the chevet and the two square interior "towers" (the staircase cut into the wall is no longer in use).)

The modern sacristy, a hemicycle adjoining the flat wall of the chevet, extends the latter, giving it "the shape of classical Romanesque chevets"; the adjoining building may be the site of the former sacristy. The modillions at the top of the apsidioles are still quite crude, whether ribbed, twisted or carved with human or animal heads.

While the chevet traditionally faces east by a few degrees, the entrance is from the south and not from the west façade. The two-bay rib-vaulted porch, still lined with its narrow stone benches, bears in its center an escutcheon marked ITIS ("In Terra Ierusalem Socii" (Note: "Allied Companions for the Holy Land".)), recalling the participation of the valley's inhabitants in the First Crusade. It leads into the church through a portal whose archivolt is made up of five simple voussoirs, the last of which forms a tiny brace beneath a statuette of the Virgin Mary.

=== Interior architecture ===
Almost unchanged since the 17th century, the building's interior, apart from its decorated ceiling, is of rustic simplicity and gives the impression of spaciousness.

The nave, with its three vaults of equal height – the central one measuring 4.5 × 14 m - receives little light from the small, "unstyled" side openings, and its floor is grey, the heavily worn wooden floor having been replaced in the 20th century by paving from the refectory of the major seminary at Saint-Flour. The choir's triumphal arch, slightly broken like the three-paneled barrel vaults, rests on two columns with capitals adorned with acanthus leaves, a frequent motif in Romanesque architecture and repeated here on the right capital of the arch at the back of the apse. The left capital, known as the "fish mermaid" capital, features a composition that is not uncommon in the region, but unusual in this location, as mermaids, with their evil influence, tend to appear at church entrances: here, a mermaid with a single tail is holding either a fish net or a harp, symbolizing her tempting role, while another undefined figure is pulling up her long legs in the position of the bi-caudal mermaids.

Some elements of the early church reused in the 11th century also stand out: two columns set into pillars, several colonnettes in the choir and apse, and some Carolingian choir capitals – among the oldest in the department. The arcades linking the choir to the apsidioles rest on small columns, some of whose shafts have been rebuilt in trachyte, and whose interlaced capitals are occasionally surmounted by horizontal cords.

The false southern tower contains the staircase leading to the tribune and bell tower, while the lower part of the opposite tower houses the baptismal font.

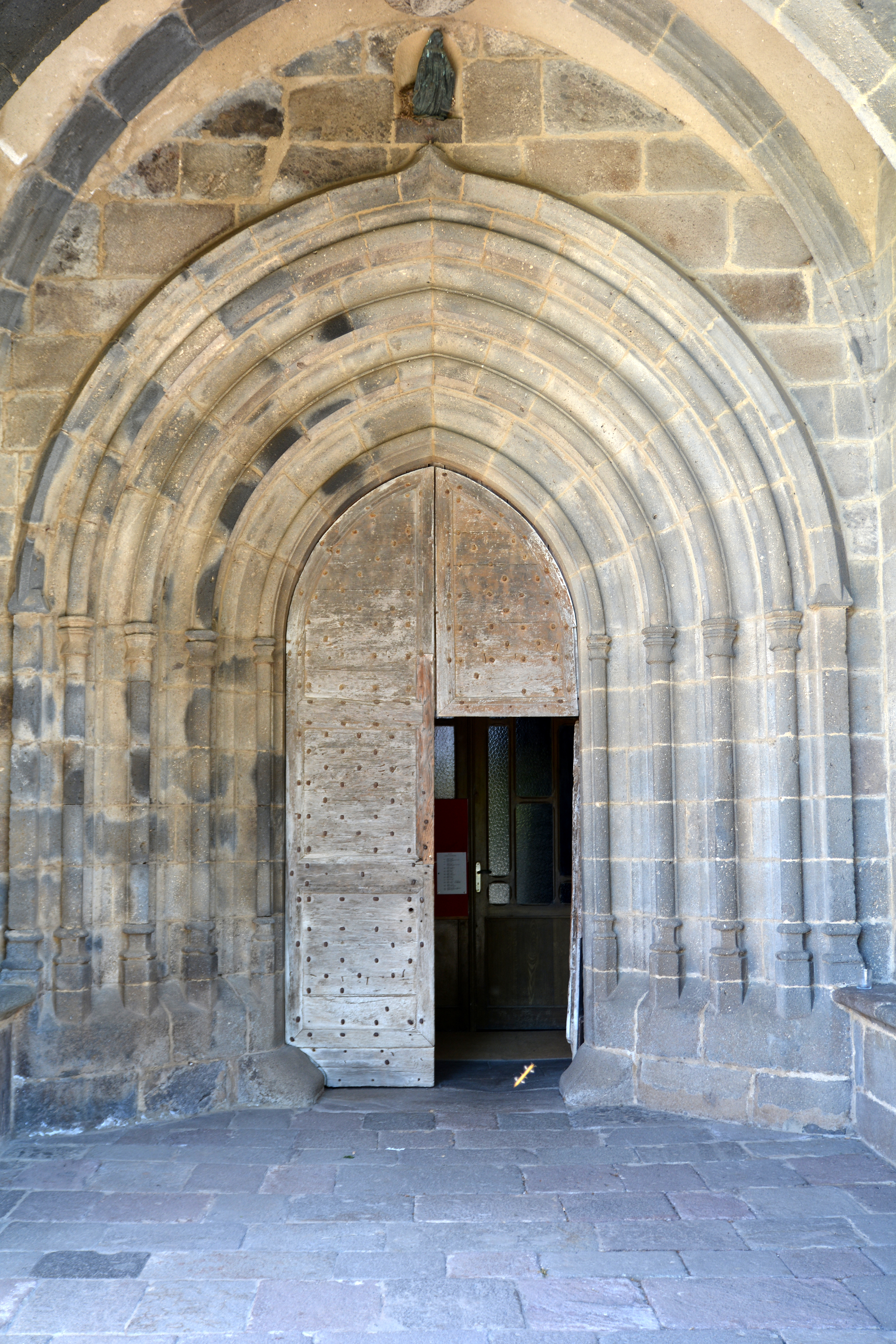
Archivolt surrounding the church entrance at the back of the porch.

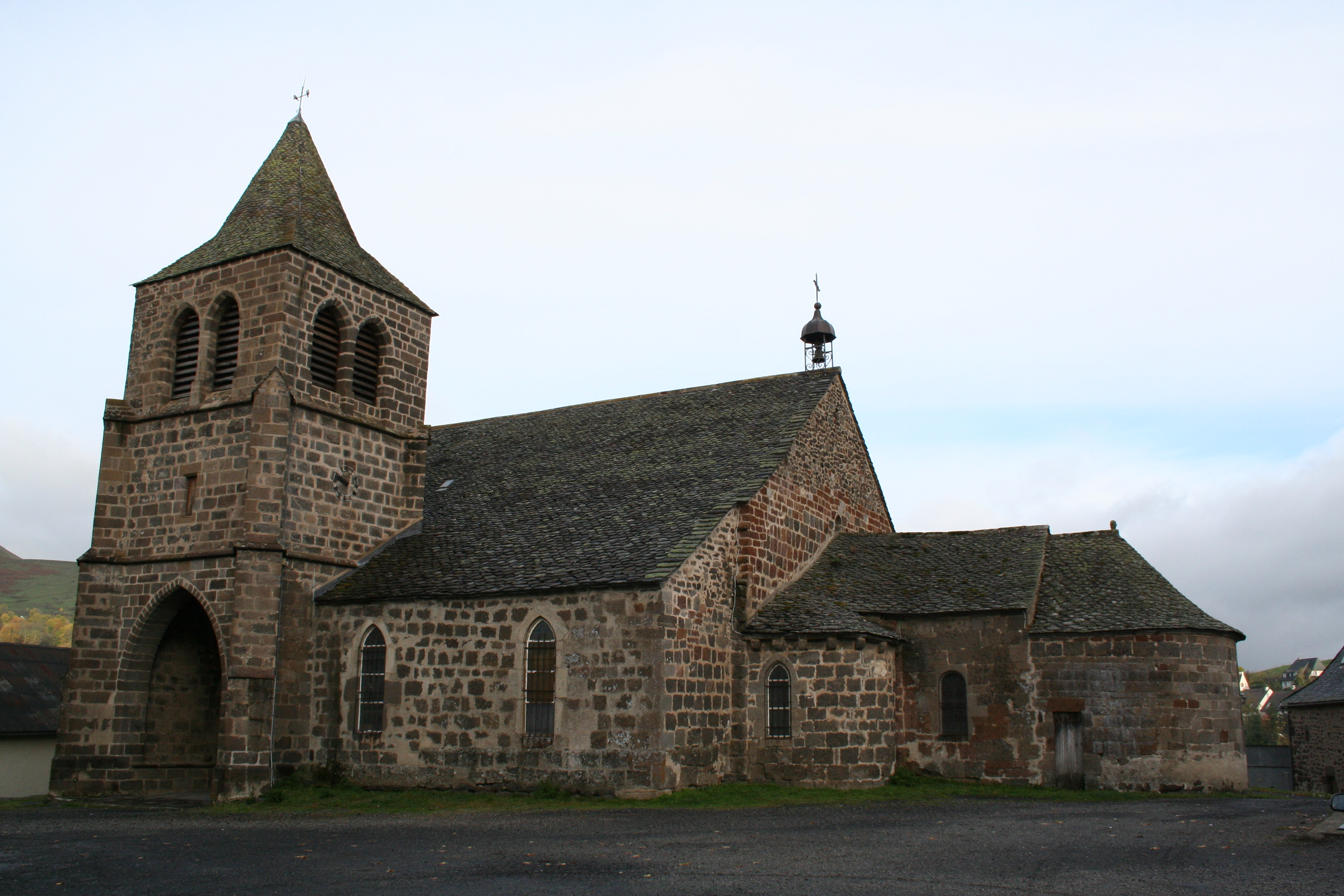
Detail of the southern apse chapel modillions.

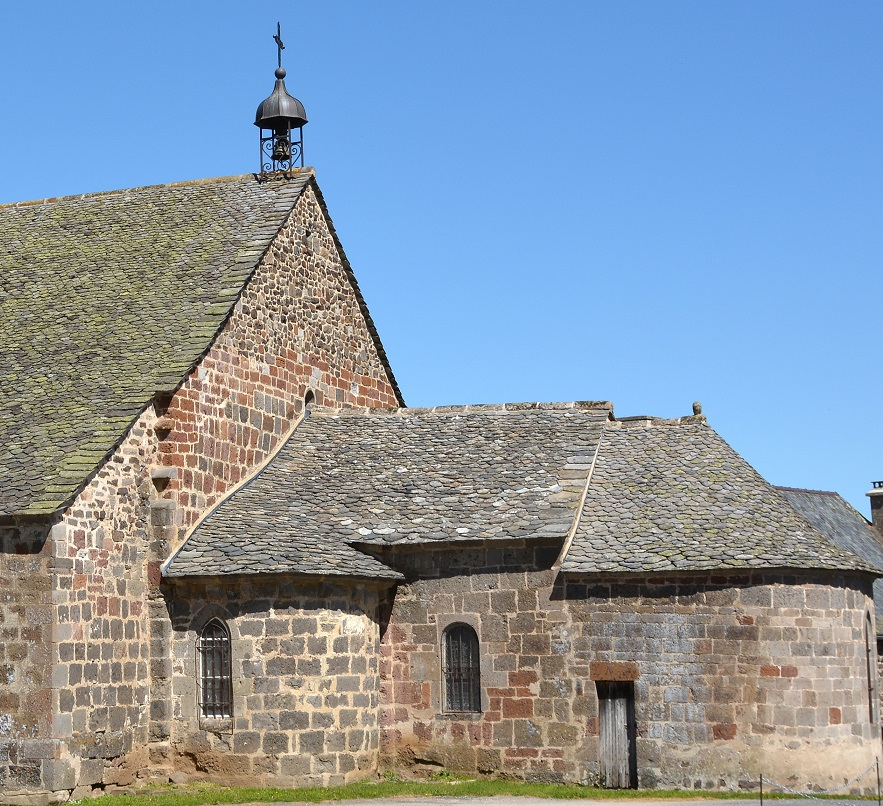
Nave floor, south absidiole, flat-walled chevet and rounded sacristy.

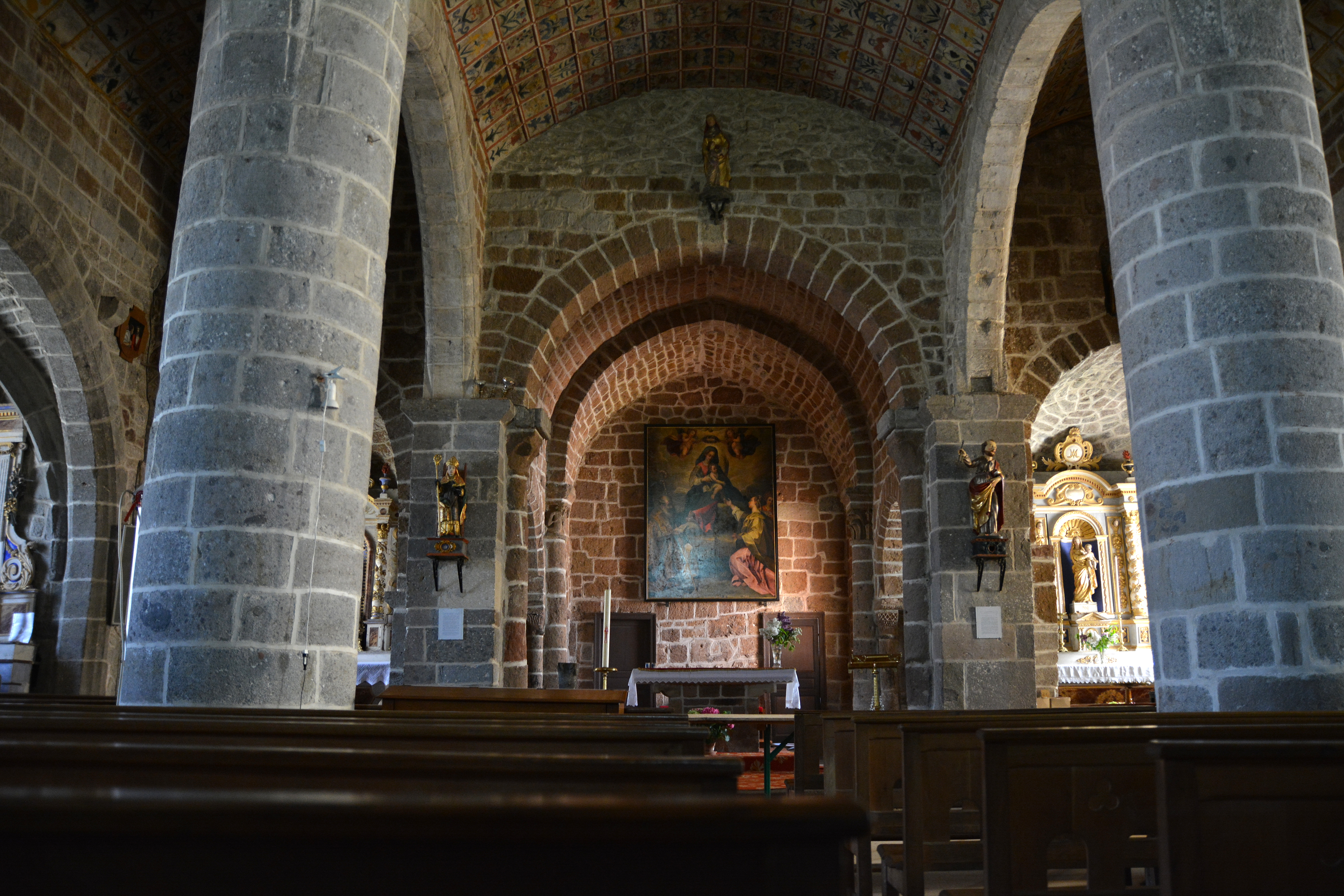
The central nave, choir, and aisles are illuminated by the southern apse on the right.

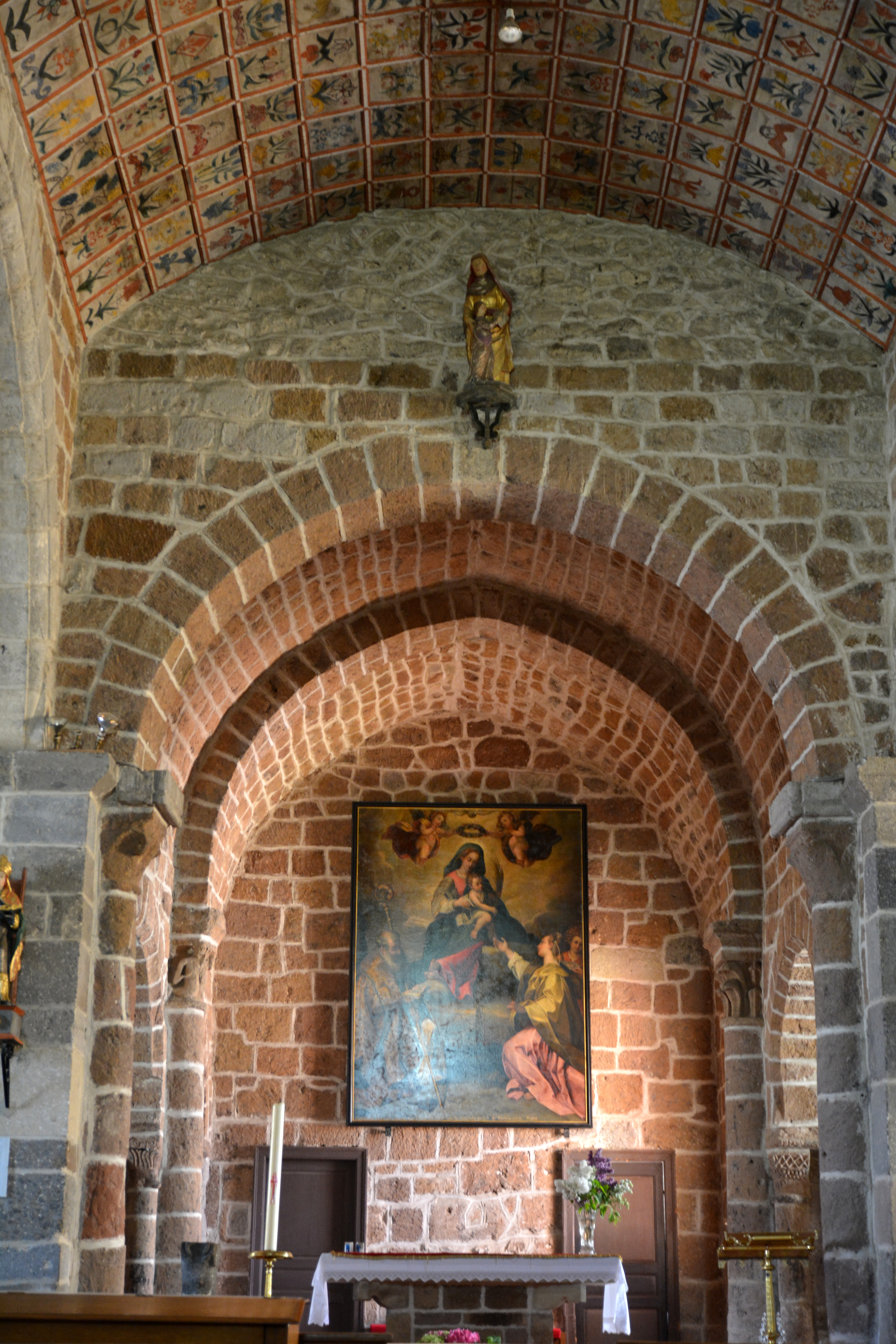
Choir floor and chevet with an anonymous Assumption of the Virgin.

=== Furnishings ===
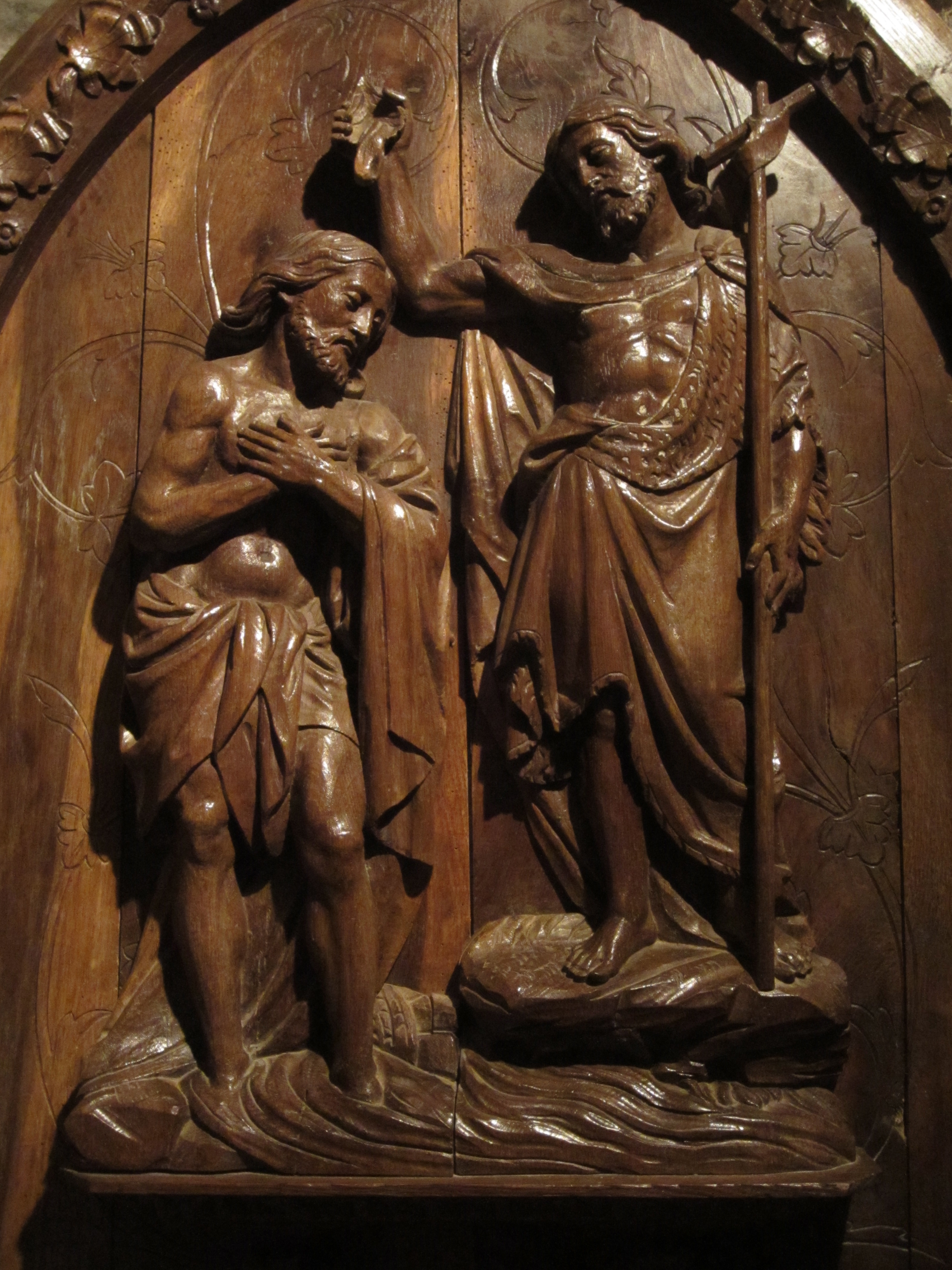
John baptizes Jesus, decoration on the door of the north "tower".

The church at Cheylade has six chapels in addition to the choir, and features a large number of liturgical furnishings, statues, and paintings.

Listed as a historical monument are the soberly sculpted 15th-century granite stoup, the trachyte baptismal font, which has been restored several times, a late 14th-century wooden Christ on the Cross, and the statue of Saint Léger to the left of the choir. This oak effigy, covered in color and gold, dates from the 15th century, but its arms, holding a book and an episcopal crosier, perhaps in place of the instruments of his torture, are not original. The doors of the two false towers, created in 1884 by a Saint-Flour sculptor and featuring Saint Léger and St. John Baptist, are not listed, nor are the small 16th-century polychrome wooden statues of Saint Anne (above the triumphal arch), Saint Peter and Saint Roch.

The church has a total of seven altars, topped by coats-of-arms or painted altarpieces. The high altar in the chancel, made from local stone and supported by a white limestone table, was designed in the mid-20th century to replace the marble altar of the previous century, which in turn had replaced a wooden altar in 1859, topped by an altarpiece that had by then been dismantled. However, the central painting, depicting the Assumption of the Virgin Mary, was removed and – after a period of purgatory in the presbytery – hung on the chevet wall. The altars in the apsidioles both date from the 18th century.

The 19th-century altarpiece in the first south chapel (facing the choir) is dedicated to Saint Léger, while that in the next, dating back to the 18th century, is dedicated to Saint Joseph. The first north chapel contains an Allégorie de la remise du rosaire à saint Dominique et sainte Catherine de Sienne (Allegory of the Delivery of the Rosary to Saint Dominic and Saint Catherine of Siena), painted in the early 19th century by an artist from Salers. The other features a 17th-century Adoration of the Shepherds, listed since 1979: long attributed to local painter François Lombard, it is now recognized as an important work by his Caravaggesque master Guy François, who was much in demand in the region after his return from Italy.

== Vault paintings ==
In 1902, Adolphe de Rochemonteix called for the preservation of a work that was both rudimentary and unique in the département: in fact, it is essentially to its ceiling that Saint-Léger church owes its listing as a historic monument in 1927, followed by its classification on February 11, 1963. The 1,360 caissons still visible – 560 in the central nave and 400 in each of the side aisles – date from well after the building's construction, but fit in all the better for having been frescoed in colors in harmony with the stone: little green, but blue, black and the whole palette of ochres. While Pierre Moulier doesn't dwell on these naïve representations, which he deems strictly decorative, Pascale Built-Werner, a specialist in late 15th-century paintings, (Note: His 1996 thesis, in musicology at the Université Paris-Sorbonne, focused on the representation of angel musicians in 15th-century iconography.)brings them closer to medieval imagery: sometimes borrowing from heraldic art, the motifs seem to her to have been inspired by medieval sculptures and illuminations, and almost all are imbued with Christian symbolism.

=== Animal depictions ===
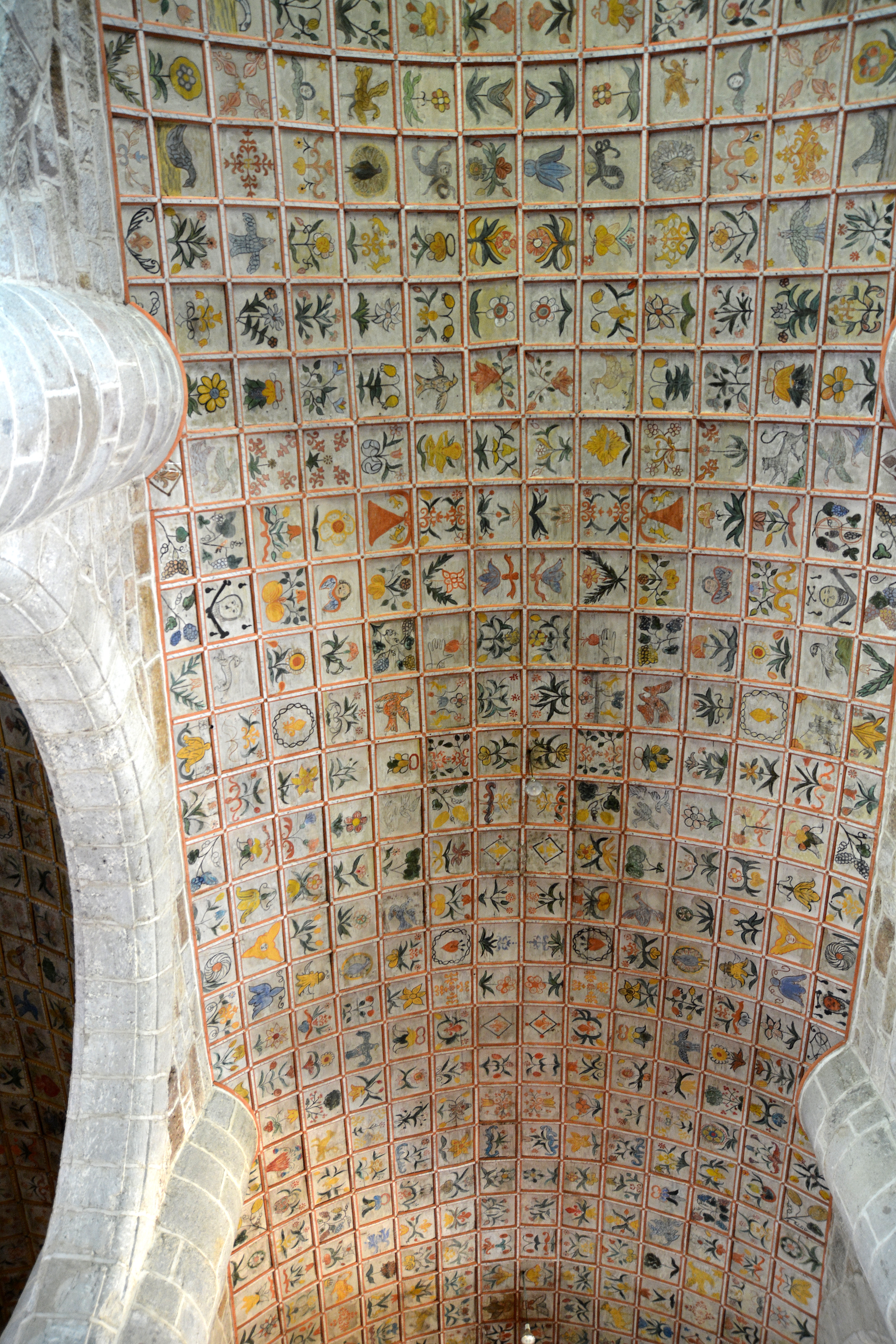
Ceiling of the central nave.

Cheylade's bestiary, like those of the Middle Ages, combines real animals with imaginary creatures.

The land animals are those of everyday rural life: dogs, hens, donkeys, horses, pigs, cows, rams, deer, wolves, foxes and more. Some represent positive virtues such as fidelity and loyalty (dog), strength and fecundity (ram), while others represent vices – filth and greed (pig), perverse cunning (fox), vanity (horse); unless they are ambivalent, like the donkey, symbolizing cowardice as well as patience and humility (Jesus of Nazareth always rides a donkey). In contrast to the stag, which suggests natural and spiritual renewal, the serpent is the usual image of the tempting devil nestled in the heart of man.

Birds are numerous and varied, often of a blue color with celestial connotations. While the swan implies beauty and purity in the art of coats of arms, other birds have a precise value in Christian symbolism, if only because their wings are in the Bible "the constant symbol of the spiritualization of beings endowed with them": The dove, for example, symbolizes peace and the Holy Spirit; the pelican refers to Christ's sacrifice; the peacock – often the embodiment of vanity – can signify resurrection and eternity; and the eagle, soaring through the air before swooping down on its prey, reminds Christians of the need to soar high to overcome sin.

As for the fish, a universal symbol of fertility particularly widespread in Christian iconography, it is the image of the faithful who have received the water of baptism.

The Cheylade vaults also feature a number of exotic and/or fantastical animals: the lion or other felines, stylized in profile as in heraldry, or even with a dragon's tail, can evoke "both the creative force and, in the Psalms, pride or the devil". A winged horse such as Pegasus, the basilisk, readily associated with lust and vanity, or Medusa, representing the dangers of the unknown, also appear.

=== Vegetable depictions ===
Oscillating between imitation of nature and creative stylization, the flora and fruit of the vine abound on the Cheylade ceiling.

Some of the flowers, whose petals surround the heart, belong to the Rosaceae family, which is very present on Romanesque capitals. They are seen from the front, in rosettes, often surrounded by a scalloped circle. Others, such as the eglantine, feature a double corolla, while still others have two or even three stems, the artist playing on the curves of the flowers and their leaves.

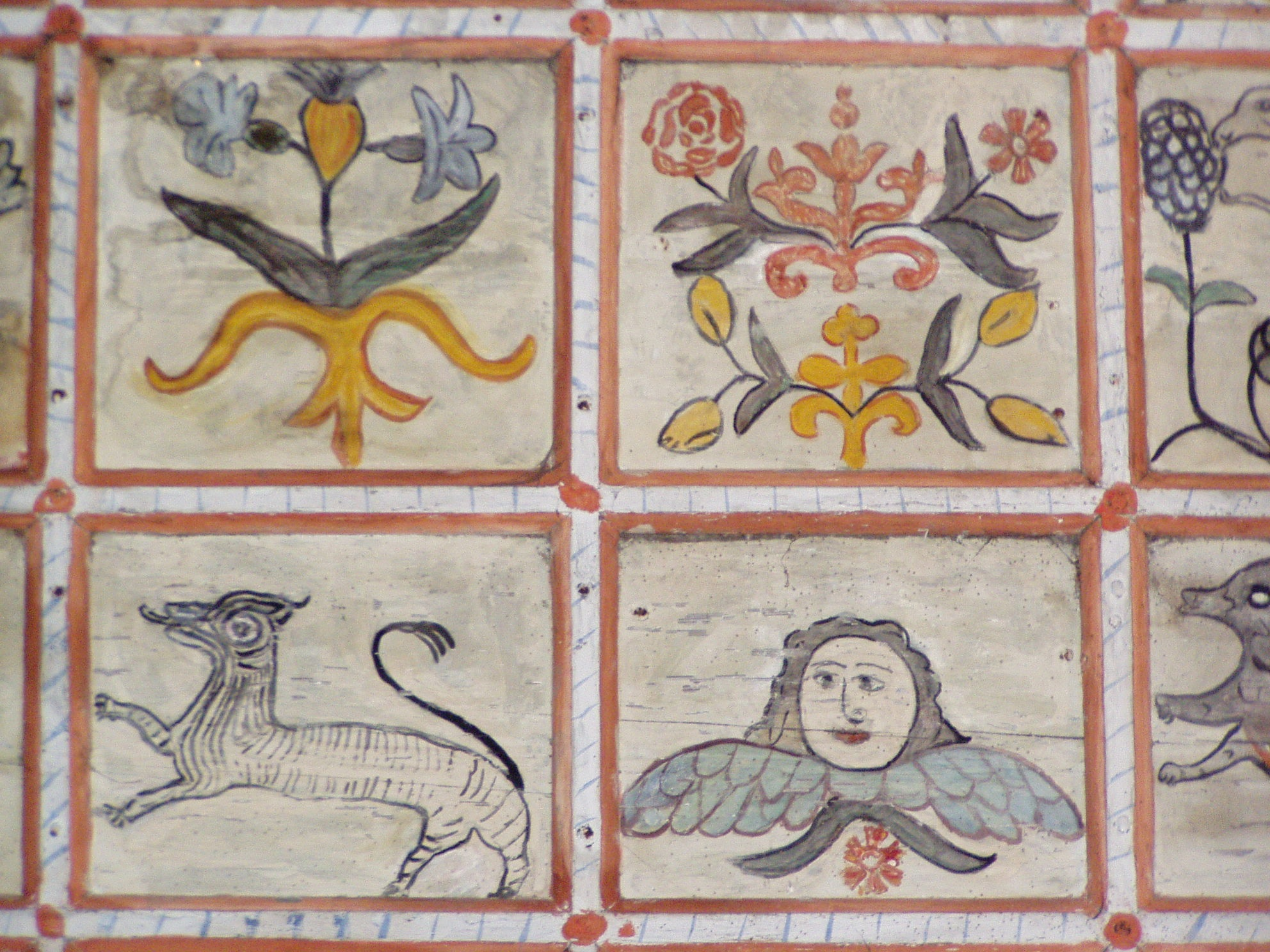
Ceiling details: floral motifs, animal (dog?) and angel's head.

Among the herbaceous field flowers, buttercups for example, some can take on symbolic value: bellflowers are often associated with coquetry, the common daisy with innocence and simplicity of heart, while the tulip, generally associated with love, is a Christian symbol of grace. Abundant in the surrounding mountains and often represented here by three red or blue flowers growing from a single stem, the wood pink could be an allusion to the Trinity. As for the sunflower, easily identifiable, it symbolizes prayer, divine love and "the soul that turns its thoughts and feelings towards God".

Generally speaking, in Christianity, the flower symbolizes the virtues of the soul and its receptivity to what comes from Heaven. Alongside flowers, grapes feature prominently in Cheylade's paintings, with their heavy bunches, three-lobed leaves and tendrils supporting the branches. Vines and wine are major elements of Judeo-Christian symbolism: the vine represents the human community, each bunch a soul, the vine Jesus, and the wine his sacrificial blood.

=== Other motifs ===
While some of the caissons bear the coats of arms of several Auvergne lordly families (Valrus, Anjony, D'Estaing...), most of the remaining images are still based on Christian iconography.

The tower marks man's desire to unite with God, and the tabernacle the protective presence of the risen Christ among mankind. The bells, whatever they announce, bring the faithful together. The fleur-de-lis, more or less stylized, yellow, red or blue, alone or with another motif, is the symbol of all Christian virtues and the emblem of the Virgin Mary.

With the exception of one, the angels are not standing: their heads rest or stand out on a pair of wings, sometimes red like those of seraphim, which emphasize the glorious representation of God the Father in painting, sometimes blue like those of cherubim, an image of holiness. Some are surrounded by stars, a reminder of their celestial affiliation.

The theme of the heart enters iconography in the mid-15th century; always red, it symbolizes inner life, profane or sacred love and charity. A heart placed on a hand is a sign of honesty and frankness: one of Cheylade's caissons features this motif in its "flaming" form, with five red lines sprouting from the top. On several occasions, this flaming heart occupies the entire frame, releasing a cluster of stylized flames: a symbol of passion that can refer to Christ's wounds (the flames then represent his blood) and express divine love, it may already be referring to the Sacred Heart. The heart, topped by three black arrows and encircled by a garland, is also part of this cult that emerged in the 17th century – unless this element, also brandished by a figure holding a large cross, symbolizes exchange and union with God.

=== Towards possible meaning ===
Without claiming to unravel all the mysteries of these paintings, Pascale Built-Werner observes that they obey a principle of symmetry, reproducing at different scales the idea of balance in a Christian conception of the world.

This can be seen firstly in certain figures, such as a double-headed stork or a blue swan reflected in the water, and then above all, notwithstanding the invisible caissons, in the overall composition, which "is articulated around axes of symmetry": each motif is repeated on either side of the central edge of each vault, conferring meaning on what would otherwise appear to be juxtaposed at random. Far from the blue ceilings strewn with stars, a frequent substitute for the celestial vault, Cheylade's caissons offer the image of the world in its order and beautiful diversity: they bear witness to the admiring gaze of the creature on Creation, suggesting its eternal cycle (animals in motion, flowers in bud/blooming, spring flowers/autumn grapes).

Man is not forgotten, although he is represented in full only once. The surprising motif of a womb with a small human head in the middle recalls his birth, and perhaps also the fundamental dogma of the Incarnation. Through all the symbols, especially animal ones, the qualities of the human being are made manifest, but also his doubts and anxieties. "Everything is in harmony, both structurally and spiritually," reflecting man's drive towards God.

== Appendix ==
=== Bibliography ===
- ^{(fr)} Adolphe de Chalvet de Rochemonteix, Les Églises romanes de la Haute-Auvergne, Paris, Picard, 1902, 518 p. (read online [archive]).
- ^{(fr)} Louis Baritou, Cheylade : Une communauté rurale en Haute-Auvergne à travers les âges, Aurillac, Éditions Gerbert, 1979, 175 p., 24 cm (ASIN B0014LCXIG).
- ^{(fr)} Pierre Moulier, Églises romanes de Haute-Auvergne : Région de Saint-Flour, vol. III, Nonette, Créer, 2001, 192 p., 24 cm (ISBN 978-2-909797-69-4, read online archive), pp. 168–170.
- ^{(fr)} Michel Maronne (dir.) et al., Association Valrhue, Église Saint-Léger, Cheylade, Nonette, Créer, 15 novembre 2004, 48 p., 22 cm, ill. in black and in color (ISBN 978-2-84819-035-8).
  - ^{(fr)} Michel Maronne and Antoine de Rochemonteix, "Le monument et son histoire", in Église Saint-Léger, Cheylade, op. cit. p. 4–28.
  - ^{(fr)} Pascale Built-Werner and Gérard Built, "La décoration de la voûte", in Église Saint-Léger, Cheylade, op. cit., pp. 29–40.

=== Related articles ===
- fr:Liste des monuments historiques du Cantal

=== External links ===
- Resources on religion : Clochers de France Observatoire du patrimoine religieux
- Resources on architecture: Mérimée
- Presentation on a tourist website for the Auvergne region archive
- Association Valrhue booklet on Saint-Léger archive
- "Fonds Jean-Philippe Usse, Église de Cheylade archive, on France Archives.
