= Catherine Jarrige =

French Roman Catholic nun

Blessed Catherine Jarrige TOSD
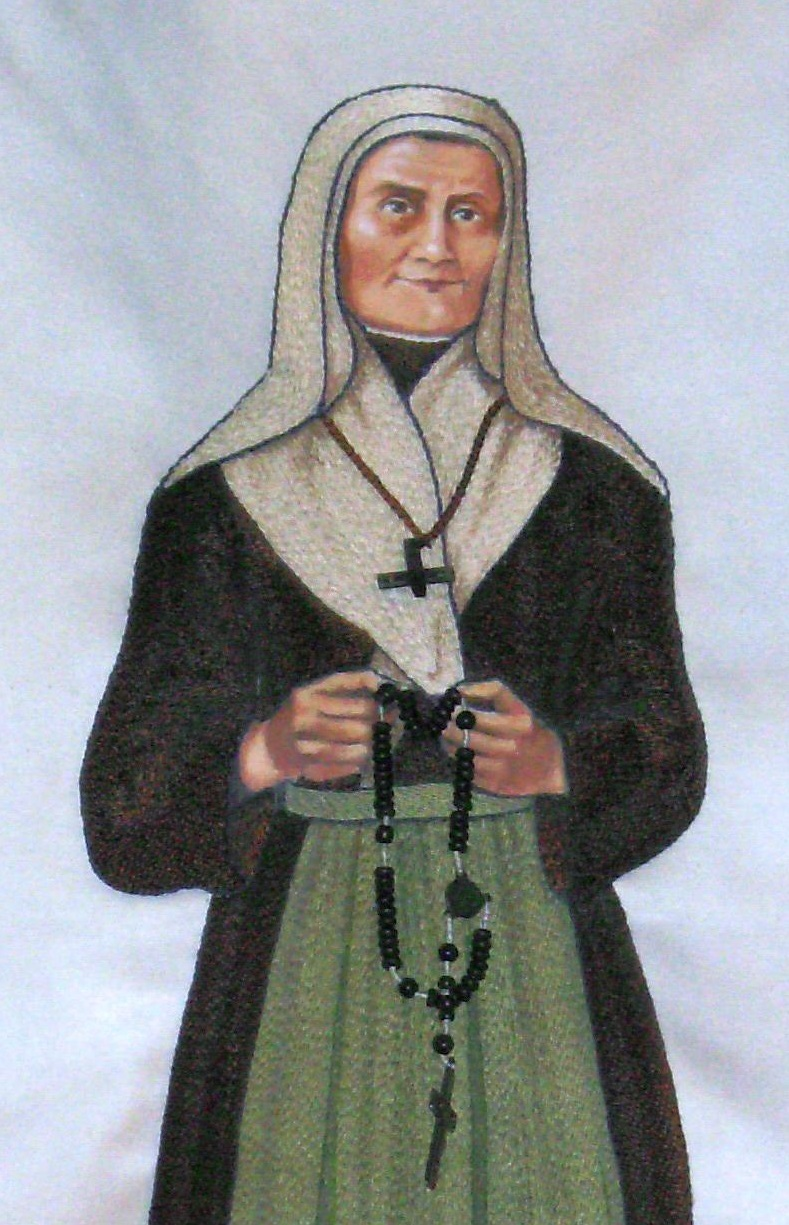
- Jarrige depicted in a parish banner
- Born: 4 October 1754; Doumis, Cantal, Kingdom of France
- Died: 4 July 1836 (aged 81); Mauriac, Cantal, July Monarchy
- Venerated in: Roman Catholic Church
- Beatified: 24 November 1996, Saint Peter's Square, Vatican City by Pope John Paul II
- Feast: 4 July

Catherine Jarrige (4 October 1754 – 4 July 1836) – known as Catinon Menette in her local dialect – was a French Roman Catholic and Dominican tertiary who was beatified in 1996.

Jarrige spent her childhood on her farm in Cantal until the death of her mother prompted her to begin lacemaking in Mauriac. She became a Dominican tertiary in Mauriac and began tending to the needs of the poor. The French Revolution did not hinder her charitable works. Alongside her care for the poor and needy, she protected the priests who refused to pledge their allegiance to the new regime.

== Life ==
Catherine Jarrige was born on 4 October 1754 to poor peasants Pierre Jarrige and Maria Célarier in Doumis. She was the youngest of seven children. Her mother died in 1767.

Jarrige worked in the fields with her parents and siblings. In 1763 she was sent to work as a servant of a neighbor. There it was said that she lived a pleasant and even mischievous life. In 1774 she went to Mauriac with her sister Toinette to work as a lacemaker. Jarrige also imitated her name patron, Catherine of Siena, and became a professed member of the Third Order of Saint Dominic in 1776. She liked to dance the Bourrée, but renounced it. She performed the dance at her sister's wedding, but pledged the next morning to never do it again - and she never did.

Jarrige spent all her life providing for the spiritual and material needs of the poor, and she went about collecting alms for them and inspiring the most reticent to awaken their conscience. She was devoted to the most humble and poorest people and provided them with food, clothing, and spiritual comfort.

The French Revolution, brought a period of anti-religious sentiment and a surge in nationalistic fervor. Jarrige helped the priests who refused to swear an oath of allegiance to the new regime. She hid them in the forests of the Auze valley, and guided them at night to administer the sacraments to families. Jarrige also procured vestments for them in secret as well as wine and wafers to celebrate Mass, risking her life many times. She carried messages to priests in hiding, and brought them warnings of patrols and roundups.

She managed to save all the priests she helped, save for one: François Filiol. In 1793 Jarrige accompanied the priest to the gallows for support. After his execution, she took some of his blood and smeared it on the face of a blind child who was cured. The executioner saw this and began to lose composure, exclaiming, "I'm lost. I'm lost. I've killed a saint!". Jarrige was also arrested several times in 1794, but authorities released her each time, fearing riots since she was a popular figure.

On one occasion she disguised a priest as a peasant to smuggle him out of the area, dousing him with wine to create the illusion that he was drunk. She also asked him to act as if he were intoxicated and to let her be the one to do the talking if a soldier neared them. A soldier did approach the pair, but Jarrige deviated from her plan and began to berate the priest as if he were her husband. The soldier came up to them and said to the disguised priest, "Citizen if I had a wife like that I'd drown her in the nearest river" and the priest responded, "Citizen so would I!"

After the Revolution, Catherine continued her works of charity. She visited prisons and supervised the restoration of the partially destroyed parish church.

== Beatification ==
Jarrige died in 1836. Her spiritual writings were approved by theologians on 12 January 1921, and her cause was formally opened by Pope Pius XI on 12 June 1929, granting her the title of Servant of God. The confirmation of her life of heroic virtue on 16 January 1953 allowed Pope Pius XII to title her as venerable. Pope John Paul II beatified Jarrige in Saint Peter's Square on 24 November 1996 after he confirmed a miracle attributed to her. The postulator for this cause is the Dominican priest Vito Tomás Gómez García.

There is a statue of Jarrige in the Church of Our Lady of the Snows in Aurillac. The Order of Preachers (Dominicans) celebrate her feast day on 4 July.

== Bibliographical details ==
- Bienheureuse Catherine Jarrige : une amie pour marcher vers le Christ, Catinon Menette 1754-1836 - Philippe Dupuy - Éditions du Signe - 1997
- Osservatore Romano : 1996 n.45 p. 7 / n.48 p. 2-3 / n.49 p. 9-10
- Documentation Catholique : 1997 n.1 p. 1-2
