= Jean-Baptiste Lacoste =

Jean-Baptiste Lacoste (30 August 1753, Mauriac – 13 August 1821) was a lawyer in Mauriac in department of the Cantal, before the French Revolution.

== Under the Revolution ==
In 1789, he was Justice of the Peace. In 1792, he was elected to the Convention for the department of the Cantal.

In 1792-93, he was Commissioner to the Army of the Moselle, under Pichegru.

After 9 Thermidor, however, he helped release Général Etienne de la Bruyère, imprisoned in Strasbourg for alleged treason, obtaining from the Committee of Public Safety, on 22 Thermidor (10 August 1794) a decree thus conceived:

The Committee of Public Safety adopts that the Major general La Bruyère, in a state of arrest, will be put at once to freedom. Signed with the register Carnot, Bréard, Barrère, Billaud-Varenne, Prior, Lindet, Tallien, Thuriot, Treillard. For extract: Barrère, Carnot, Treillard, Echasériaux

The young representative announced to him this good news by letter:

Paris, 28 Thermidor, year 2 of the Republic One and Indivisible J.B. Lacoste, Representative of the People à La Bruyère Citizen, as I recognized always in you a true Republican and approved, I never lost sight of the fact you. I requested from the Committee of Public Safety, your freedom; it has just been granted to me by a decree which I will send tomorrow to the Major general of Haut-Rhin. This act of justice is still one of the benefits of the fall of the Tyrants. If you come to Paris, you will always find me been willing to return on your account a testimony similar to your good behavior and the purity of your principles. Hello and Fraternity. Signed: J.B. Lacoste

In Alsace, he created a revolutionary commission which was chaired by Euloge Schneider. That was worth a long captivity for him, which finishes thanks to the amnesty of the 3 brumaire, year IV, (25 October 1795).

== Under the Consulate and the First Empire ==
He was named prefect.

== Under the Restoration ==
Louis XVIII exiled him, but rather quickly allowed him to return in France.

== Sources ==
- French Revolution of Jules Michelet and handwritten Memorial of the family of La Bruyère
