= Cheylade =

Commune in Auvergne-Rhône-Alpes, France

- Commune
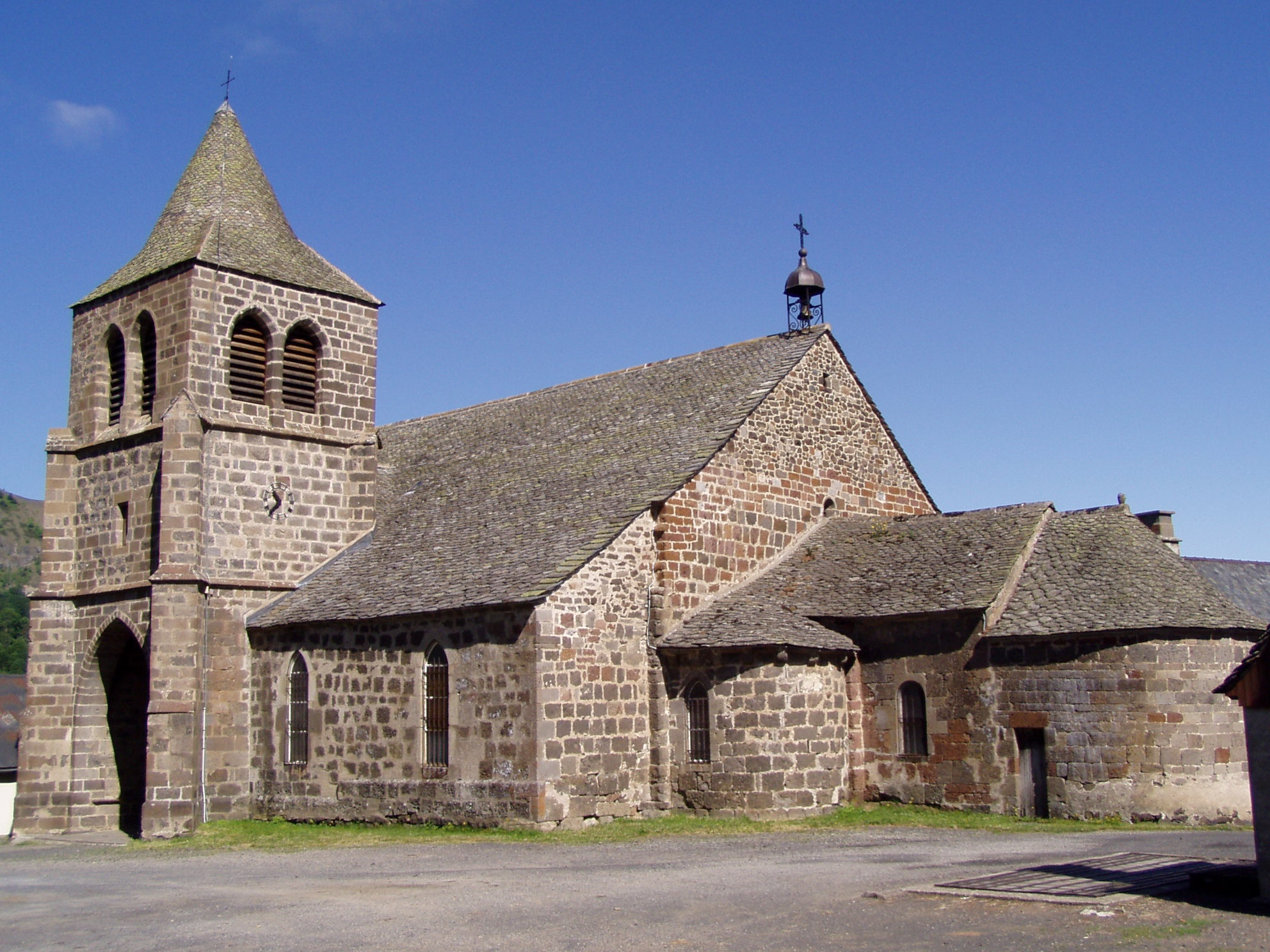
- The church of Saint Léger, in Cheylade
- Location of Cheylade
- Location within France Location within Auvergne-Rhône-Alpes
- Coordinates: 45°12′37″N 2°43′00″E
- Country: France
- Region: Auvergne-Rhône-Alpes
- Department: Cantal
- Arrondissement: Saint-Flour
- Canton: Murat
- Intercommunality: Pays Gentiane

Government
  - Mayor (2020–2026): Christophe Raynal
- Area^{1}: 32.81 km^{2} (12.67 sq mi)
- Elevation: 950 m (3,120 ft)
- Highest elevation: 1,490 m (4,890 ft)
- Lowest elevation: 914 m (2,999 ft)
- Population (2023): 230
  - Density: 7.0/km^{2} (18/sq mi)
- Time zone: UTC+01:00 (CET)
  - Summer (DST): UTC+02:00 (CEST)
- INSEE/Postal code: 15049 /15400
- ^{1} French Land Register data, which excludes lakes, ponds, glaciers > 1 km^{2} (0.386 sq mi or 247 acres) and river estuaries.

Cheylade (French pronunciation: [ʃelad]; Auvergnat: Chailada) is a commune in the Cantal department in south-central France.

== Population ==
Historical population
Year	Pop.	±% p.a.
1968	610	—
1975	505	−2.66%
1982	424	−2.47%
1990	360	−2.02%
1999	336	−0.76%
2007	286	−1.99%
2012	246	−2.97%
2017	225	−1.77%
2023	230	+0.37%
Source: INSEE

== See also ==
- Communes of the Cantal department
- Saint-Léger de Cheylade Church
