= Dirge (album) =

Studio album by Wormrot
- Released: 3 May 2011
- Genre: Grindcore, crust punk
- Length: 17:57
- Label: Earache
- Producer: Ah Boy

Wormrot chronology
Food for the Revolution #1 (2011)	Dirge (2011)	Voices (2016)

Dirge is the second studio album by Singaporean grindcore band Wormrot. It was released on 3 May 2011 by Earache Records. The digital version of the album was released for free download in prior due to an online leak.

== Musical style ==
Compared to the band's previous album Abuse, Dirge is said to feature less of a death metal influence in favor of a punk rock- and crust-indebted sound while still staying firm in their metallic roots. According to Allmusic, the album features 25 songs, "every one a relentless assault of grinding guitar (doubled in the studio to give extra heft), anarchic yet complex drumming, and hoarse, agitated vocals." The shortest track on the record, "You Suffer But Why Is It My Problem", pays tribute to Napalm Death. The track "Deceased Occupation" is driven by a sludgy riff reminiscent of Eyehategod, while the track "Principle of Puppet Warfare" was described as "a pure punk rock slam-fuel."

In an interview with Exclaim!, guitarist Rasyid stated:

Dirge is much more punk and noise, in terms of production, sound of the band and composition. It's faster than Abuse, and I'm not talking about BPMs; it's unfriendly, less accessible. There's less death metal riffage and more punk chords.

== Critical reception ==
Professional ratings
Review scores
Source	Rating
Allmusic	4.5/5 stars
Revolver	4/5

Dirge received generally positive reviews from critics. Allmusic critic Phil Freeman wrote that "even as Wormrot's songs blur into a single massive assault, they have a punk rock catchiness that some of the more metallic grindcore acts don't share," concluding: "It's possible to have a favorite Wormrot song, something that can't be said about the legions of lesser grindcore bands out there." Revolver's Chris Krovatin stated: "Vocalist Arif and drummer-singer Fit utilize a twin growl/shriek attack that maintains a sense of violent panic, but it’s guitarist Rasyid’s toxic riffs and overdriven leads that give Wormrot their impressively dark atmosphere, a nihilistic malaise that hangs somewhere south of Pig Destroyer and north of Exhumed." Krovatin also further wrote: "The album is not a crossover darling—the band does little to evolve its sound, and if you don’t particularly like grindcore, you’ll hate this—but within their grimy musical crawlspace, these guys are kicking ass." Greg Pratt of Exclaim! commented: "It's a sound they nail to perfection on this excellent album, which has as its only downfall the monotony that, if history has taught us anything, we know that all classic grind carries with it."

== Track listing ==
All songs written by Wormrot.

No.	Title	Length
1.	"No One Gives a Shit"	0:43
2.	"Compulsive Disposition"	1:02
3.	"All Go No Emo"	0:24
4.	"Public Display of Infection"	1:00
5.	"Overpowered Violence"	0:39
6.	"Semiconscious Godsize Dumbass"	0:31
7.	"Spot a Pathetic"	0:34
8.	"Evolved Into Nothing"	0:43
9.	"Butt Krieg Is Showing"	0:49
10.	"Fucking Fierce So What"	0:04
11.	"Ferocious Bombardment"	0:35
12.	"Principle of the Puppet Warfare"	1:02
13.	"Deceased Occupation"	1:26
14.	"Waste of Time"	0:41
15.	"Stench of Ignorance"	0:29
16.	"Meteor to the Face"	0:38
17.	"Addicts of Misery"	0:37
18.	"You Suffer But Why Is It My Problem"	0:04
19.	"Erased Existence"	0:42
20.	"Back Stabber Mission Aborted"	0:41
21.	"Destruct the Bastards"	0:10
22.	"Plunged Into Illusions"	0:33
23.	"Manipulation"	0:56
24.	"A Dead Issue"	1:07
25.	"The Final Insult"	1:48

Limited edition LP bonus tracks

26. "Grind Emergency" — 1:53"
27. "Grind on Impulse" — 1:12"

== Personnel ==
Album credits as adapted from Allmusic:

Wormrot

- Arif — vocals, inlay artwork
- Rasyid — guitars
- Fitri — drums

Other personnel

- Ah Boy — engineering, recording, production, mastering
- Andrei Bouzikov — artwork
- Summer Lacy — layout
