= Mauriac, Cantal =

Subprefecture and commune in Auvergne-Rhône-Alpes, France

Mauriac
- Subprefecture and commune
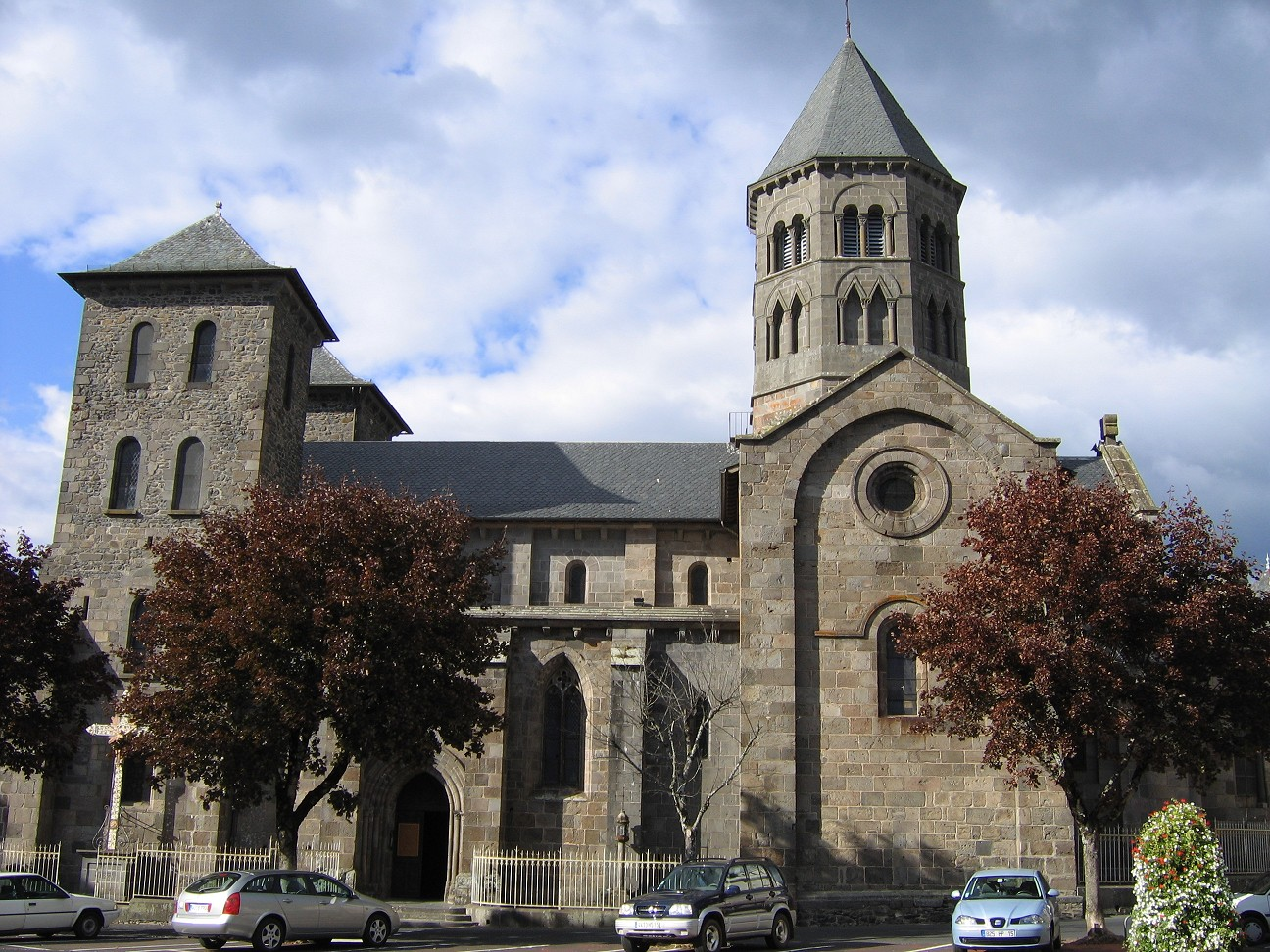
- Notre-Dame-des-Miracles basilica

- Coat of arms
- Location of Mauriac
- Location within France Location within Auvergne-Rhône-Alpes
- Coordinates: 45°13′11″N 2°20′03″E
- Country: France
- Region: Auvergne-Rhône-Alpes
- Department: Cantal
- Arrondissement: Mauriac
- Canton: Mauriac

Government
  - Mayor (2020–2026): Edwige Zanchi
- Area^{1}: 27.61 km^{2} (10.66 sq mi)
- Elevation: 722 m (2,369 ft)
- Highest elevation: 760 m (2,490 ft)
- Lowest elevation: 351 m (1,152 ft)
- Population (2023): 3,449
  - Density: 124.9/km^{2} (323.5/sq mi)
- Time zone: UTC+01:00 (CET)
  - Summer (DST): UTC+02:00 (CEST)
- INSEE/Postal code: 15120 /15200
- ^{1} French Land Register data, which excludes lakes, ponds, glaciers > 1 km^{2} (0.386 sq mi or 247 acres) and river estuaries.

Mauriac (French pronunciation: [moʁjak]; Occitan: [mawɾiˈak]) is a commune in the Cantal department in the Auvergne region in south-central France.

It lies 63 kilometres (39 mi) north-northwest of Aurillac by rail.

Mauriac, built on the slope of a volcanic hill, has a medieval church, and the buildings of an old abbey now used as public offices and dwellings; the town owes its origin to the abbey, which originated from a 6th-century foundation.

== Geography ==
Mauriac is situated in the northwest of Cantal, close to the border with the Corrèze and Limousin departments.

The greater part of the Mauriac arrondissement is watered by the Saint-Jean, a brook which flows past the southwestern edge of the town and fills the lac du Val Saint-Jean, a small reservoir, before flowing into Auze, an important tributary of the Dordogne.

Mauriac is in hilly terrain, with the main populated area falling into a zone at an altitude of about 350–450 metres, while the surrounding areas rise to about 760 metres in the volcanic foothills.

== History ==
Childebert, daughter of Clovis I, reported that she had had a vision of the Virgin Mary, carrying the infant Christ, and accompanied by Saint Peter. This led her to found a chapel at the side of the Rieu Mauri, the small stream now known as the ruisseau Saint-Jean. This later grew into the Benedictine abbey of Saint Peter, the centre of a considerable pilgrimage.

Increasing wealth allowed the abbey to begin construction of a considerable Romanesque church in the 11th century, commencing with the choir. The nave and belfry followed in the 12th century, and the process culminated in the building of a great west portal, surmounted by an Ascension of Christ, in the 13th. The belfry fell into disrepair during the French Wars of Religion and during the French Revolution, requiring reconstruction in 1625 and in 1845. The two towers were 17th century additions.

The abbey itself was dissolved during the Revolution and the land sold off in lots. The remains of the abbey buildings were incorporated into houses and municipal buildings. A large part of these remains, including the chapter house, were purchased by the town in 1984 and restored with the help of the Ministry of Culture.

The town became notable during the Revolutionary period for the work of Catherine Jarrige (1754–1836), a tertiary of the Dominican Order, famous both for her works of charity. She was especially noted for concealing refractory priests, who refused to compromise with state control of the Church, as embodied in Civil Constitution of the Clergy of 1790. She remains closely associated with the church and was beatified by Pope John Paul II in 1996.

The church, now known as Notre-Dame-des-Miracles, was promoted to the status of basilica in 1921, under Pope Benedict XV, and is now one of 167 churches so recognised in France. It remains a place of pilgrimage, and its fine furnishings and fittings attract considerable interest.

== Administration ==
Mauriac is the seat of a sub-prefect and has a tribunal of first instance and a communal college. The present mayor is a member of the centre-right Union for a Popular Movement.

== Population ==
Inhabitant of the area are known as Mauriacois in French.

Historical population
Year	Pop.	±% p.a.
1968	3,803	—
1975	4,093	+1.06%
1982	4,333	+0.82%
1990	4,224	−0.32%
1999	4,019	−0.55%
2007	3,898	−0.38%
2012	3,753	−0.76%
2017	3,603	−0.81%
2023	3,449	−0.73%
Source: INSEE

== Culture and language ==
The Mauriac area is a stronghold of the Auvergnat dialect of the Occitan language, which has about 1.5 million speakers, mostly in the Puy-de-Dôme and Cantal départements. Although all of the population also speak French, Auvergnat is still the mother tongue in many homes and is still used in public and in private by some residents. Its lexis, grammar and phonology are also likely to influence the usage of spoken French. The placename Mauriac has precisely the same written form in both languages but is pronounced as "Mouria" in Auvergnat.

== Economy ==
Mauriac is the main market town and shopping centre of the arrondissement. It still attracts pilgrims, as well as tourists because of its proximity to the Dordogne valley and the mountains of Cantal, particularly the Puy Mary. The countryside of Mauriac and its neighbouring communes is known as the Pays de Salers, and is marketed under this name. It is famous for its dairy industry, particularly Salers and Cantal cheeses. There are marble quarries in the vicinity of Mauriac.

== Major buildings ==
Mauriac has a considerable number of medieval and early modern buildings, mostly grouped in its historic centre, close to the basilica church and the former abbey site. Together, they form the main focus for tourists in the town.

=== Romanesque basilica of Notre-Dame-des-Miracles ===
A fine building in a local Auvergnat version of the Romanesque style. It is noted particularly for its carved western portal and its collection of 18th century Baroque furnishings.

=== Remains of Saint Peter's abbey ===
The abbey was built in the 12th century to replace an earlier Carolingian monastery, which had itself been built on the site of a pagan shrine dedicated to Mercury. The most important remains, including the chapter house, are now in municipal ownership.

=== Former Jesuit college ===
Built after 1563 under the terms of a bequest of Guillaume Duprat, bishop of Clermont, and rebuilt in the 18th century, the college has a magnificent portal and a Baroque chapel with a prominent retable. Today the building serves the local lycée.

=== Hôtel d'Orcet ===
Built in the 18th century by Gabriel de Viger d'Orcet, a local tax collector, and incorporating a restored 15th-century tower, the hôtel houses two large Aubusson tapestries representing outdoor games. Today it is the headquarters of the sub-prefecture.

== Notable people ==
- Jean-François Marmontel (11 July 1723 – 31 December 1799), historian and writer, a member of the Encyclopediste movement, was educated by the Jesuits at Mauriac.
- Jean-Baptiste Lacoste (died 1821), was a lawyer in Mauriac before the Revolution, and later a member of the National Convention and an active revolutionary.
- Blessed Catherine Jarrige (4 October 1754 – 4 July 1836), known as Catinon Menette, a beatified third-order Dominican of the Catholic Church (see above) was active mainly in Mauriac and is venerated locally.
- Jules-Géraud Saliège (24 February 1870 – 5 November 1956), a cardinal of the Roman Catholic Church, was born at a hamlet close to Mauriac. He served as Archbishop of Toulouse from 1928 until his death, and was elevated to the cardinalate in 1946 by Pope Pius XII. He was an outspoken critic of the German occupation of France during World War II and of the Vichy régime.
- Fernand Talandier (15 May 1872 – 22 August 1957), who was born at Murat, to the east of Mauriac, was a French politician. He served as mayor of Mauriac for a prodigious term, from 1912 to 1945. In 1936, he entered the Chamber of Deputies as a Radical Independent, and a supporter of the democratic left bloc. He nevertheless supported the handover of power to Marshal Philippe Pétain in 1940. He never recovered his credibility and was unable to regain a political mandate after the war.
- Marius-Félix-Antoine Maziers (1 March 1915 – 14 August 2008), born at Mauriac, was an archbishop of Lyon and later Archbishop of Bordeaux.
- Louis Bergaud (30 November 1928), born at Embrassac de Jabeyrac, a hamlet to the north of Mauriac, was a French professional road bicycle racer.
- Biquette (c. 2003 - December 2013) also known as Biquette de Mauriac or the punk rock goat, was a rescued factory milking goat, whose photos taken as a part of the audience during punk rock and heavy metal concerts became viral on the internet.

== See also ==
- Communes of the Cantal department

== Gallery ==
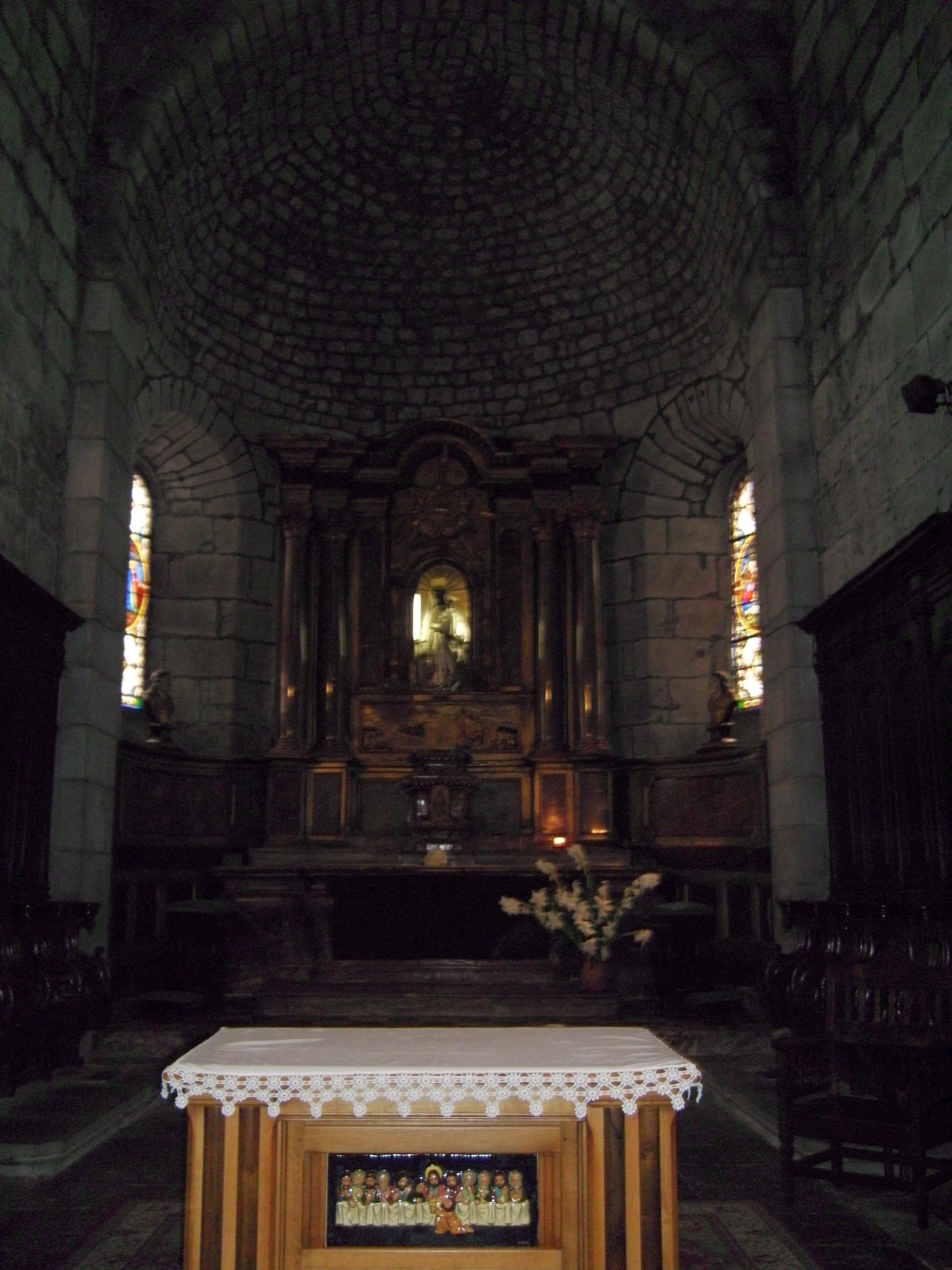
Choir of Notre-Dame-des-Miracles.

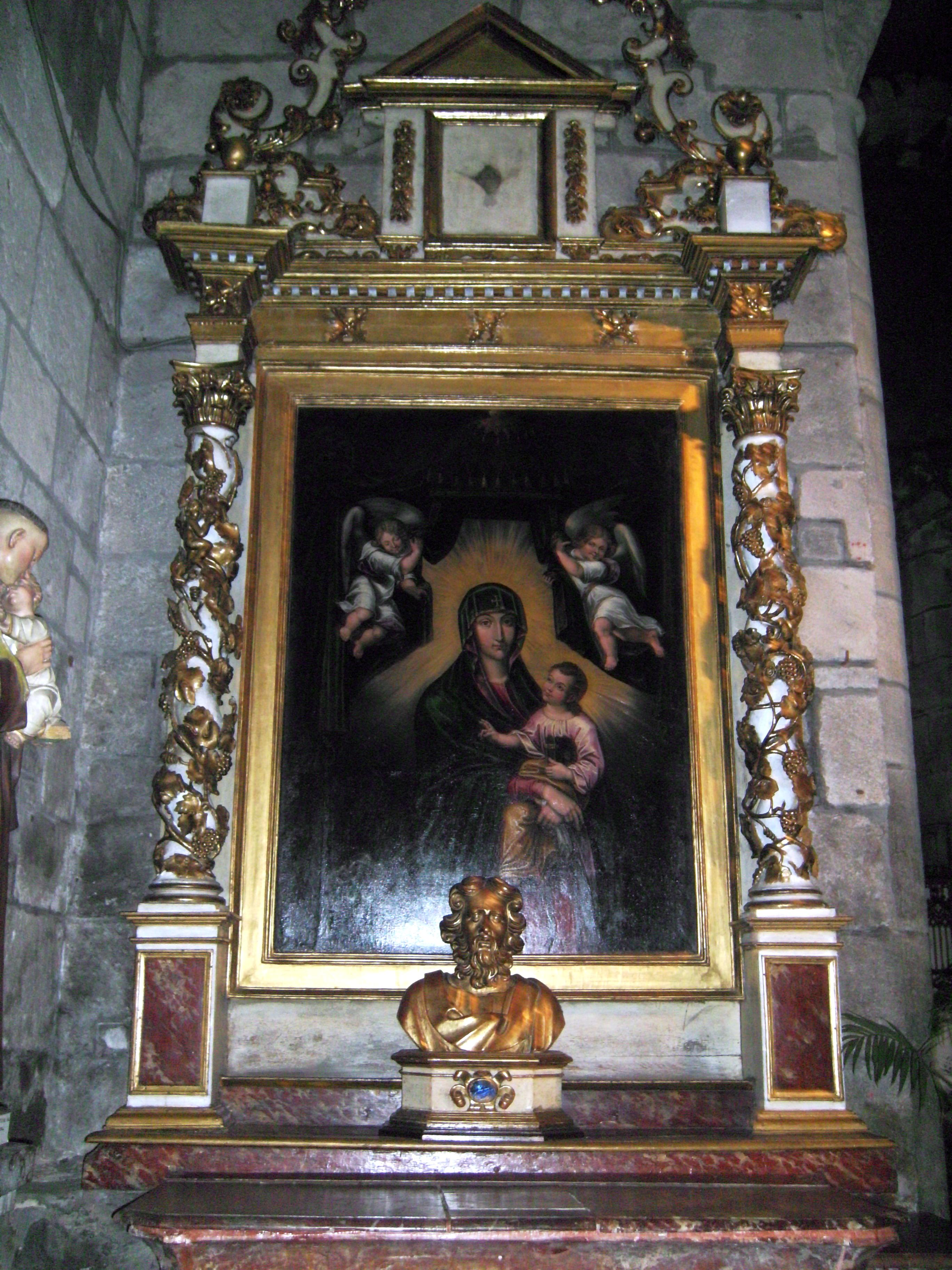
Baroque chapel altar, with reredos showing Virgin and Child, Notre-Dame-des-Miracles.

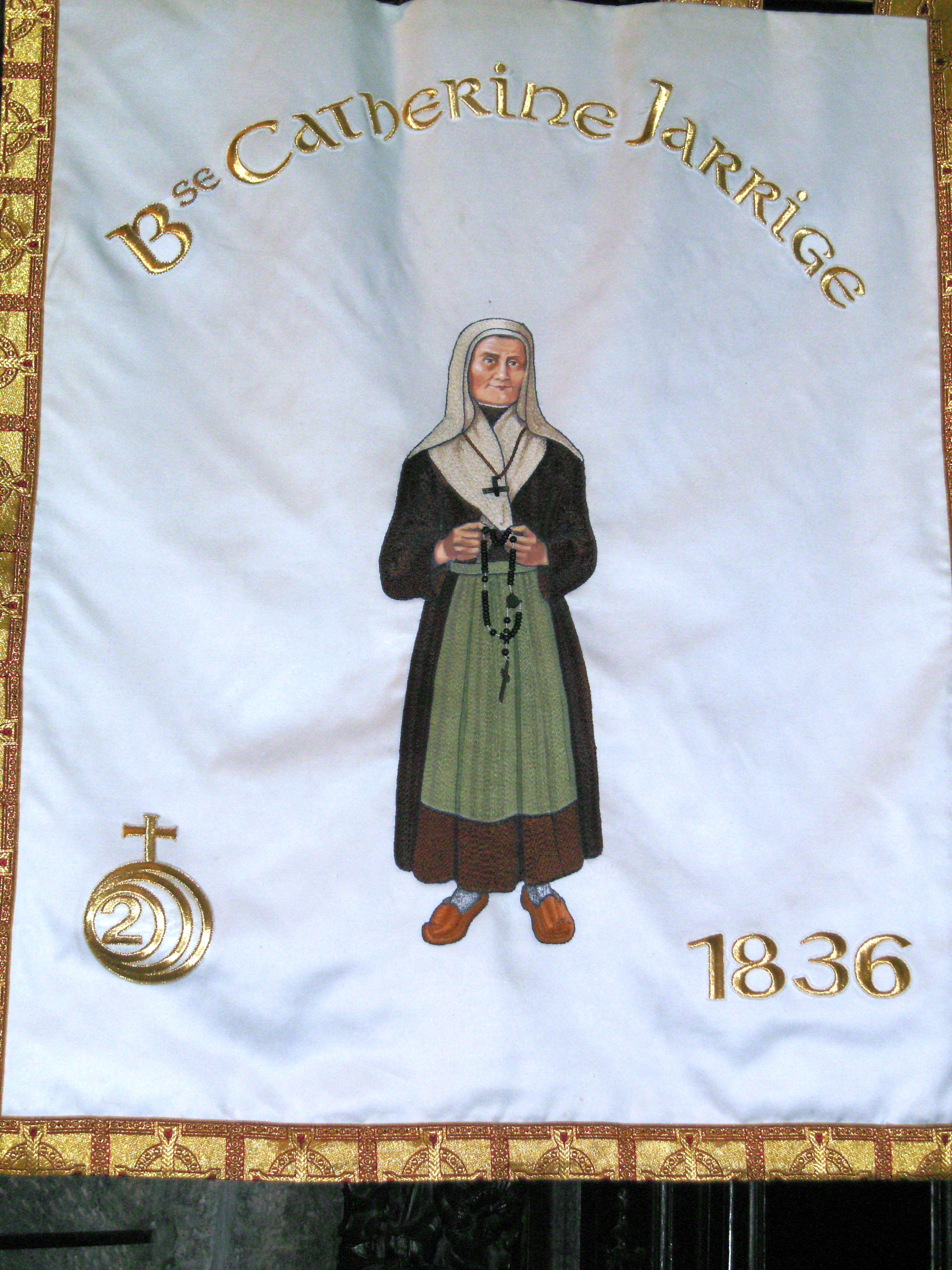
Banner showing the Blessed Catherine Jarrige in Notre-Dame-des-Miracles.

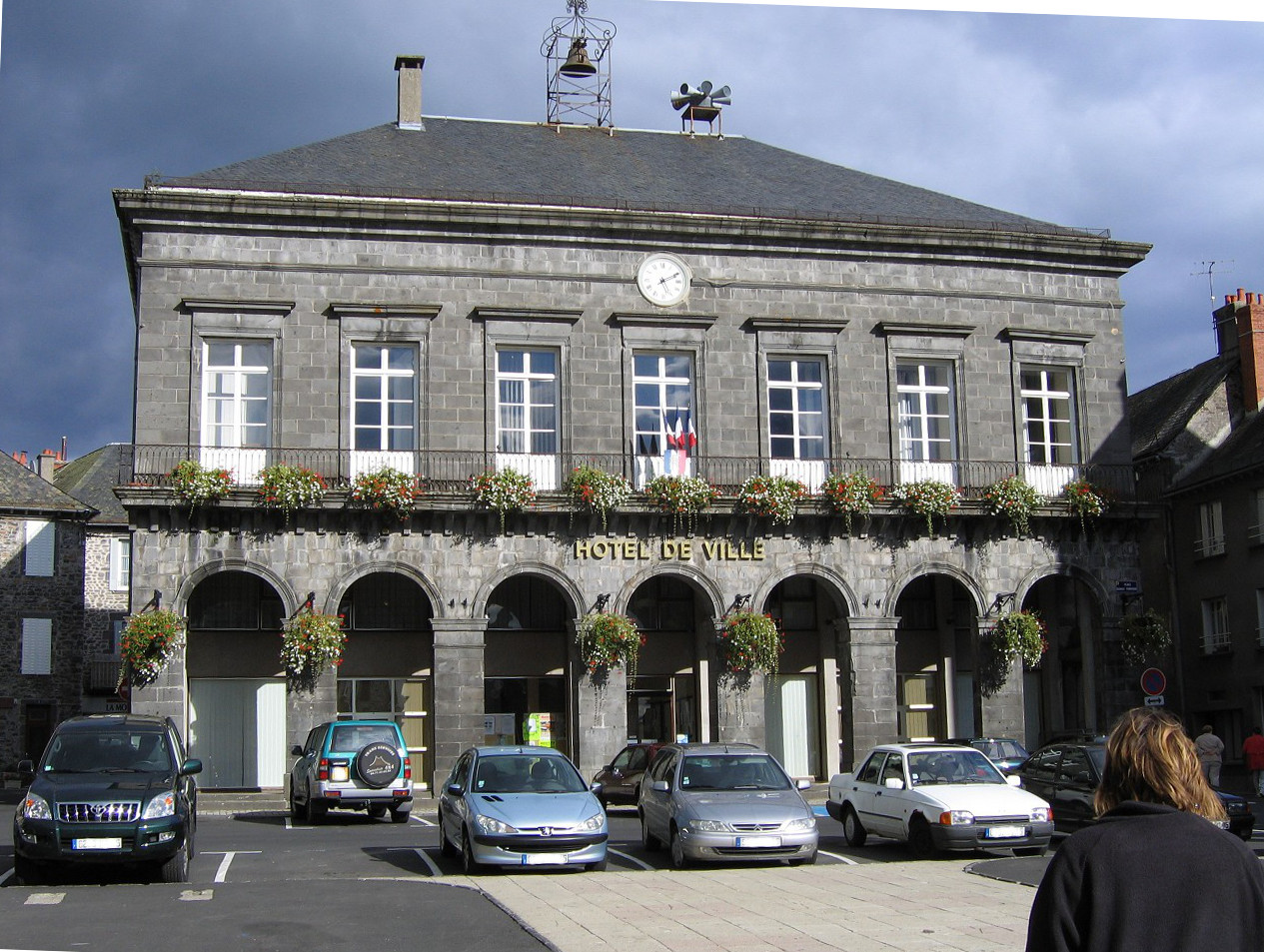
The Hôtel de Ville or town hall, situated on the main square at right angles to the church.

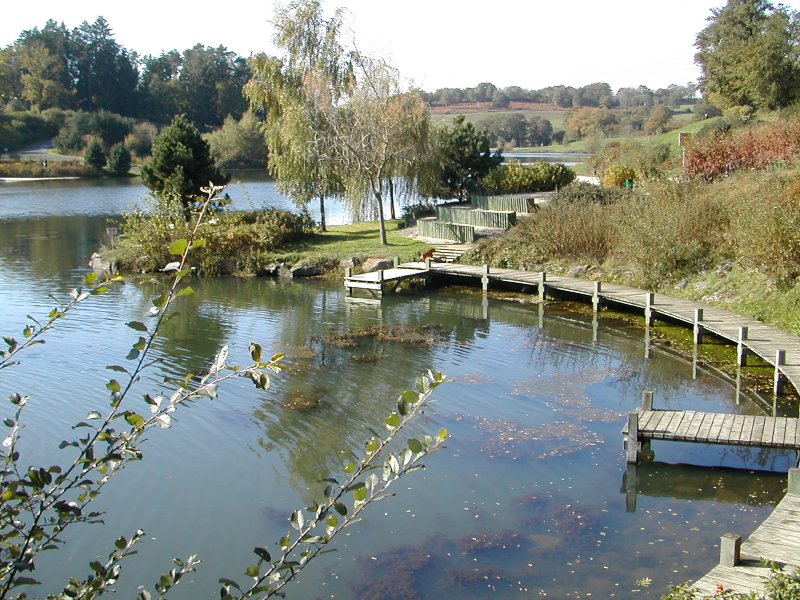
Le lac du Val St Jean, a small reservoir near Mauriac.

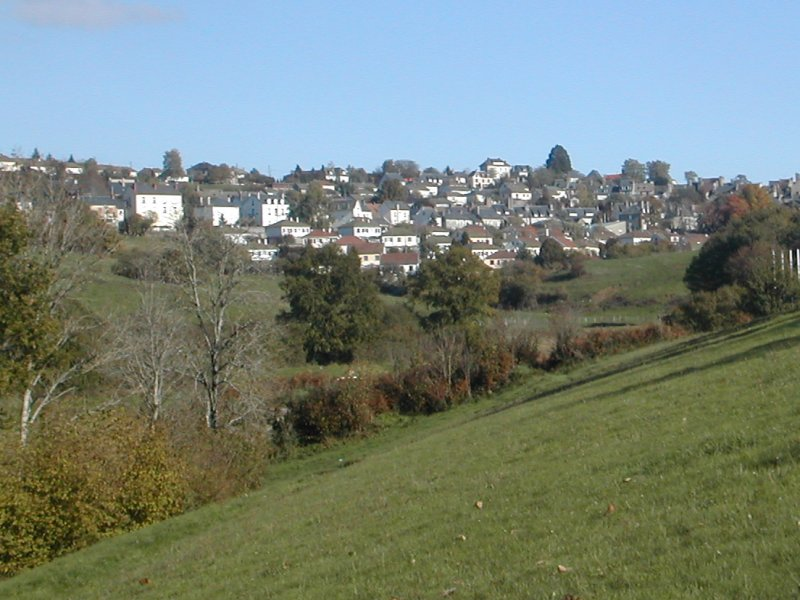
The town of Mauriac viewed from the lac du Val St Jean.
