= Hiss (album) =

Studio album by Wormrot
- Released: 8 July 2022
- Studio: Snakeweed Studios
- Genre: Grindcore; powerviolence
- Length: 32:50
- Label: Earache
- Producer: Leonard Soosay

Wormrot chronology
Voices (2016)	Hiss (2022)

Professional ratings
Review scores
Source	Rating
Kerrang!	4/5 stars
Laut.de	4/5 stars
Metal Injection	10/10 stars
Metal Hammer	5.5/7 stars
Sputnikmusic	4.5/5 stars

Hiss is the fourth studio album by Singaporean grindcore band Wormrot. It was released on 8 July 2022 on Earache Records. Hiss received positive reviews from music critics and was recognized as one of the best metal releases of 2022. The tracks "Behind Closed Doors", "When Talking Fails, It's Time for Violence", "Weeping Willow" were released as singles, and a music video was filmed for "Grieve", "Weeping Willow" and "Voiceless Choir". Hiss was the second and last Wormrot album to feature drummer Vijesh who left the band in July 2024.

== Background ==
On 16 March 2022, Wormrot released two singles, "Behind Closed Doors" and "When Talking Fails, It's Time for Violence", and announced the release of a new studio album. A music video for the tracks was filmed at Snakeweed Studios in Singapore, where the album was recorded. The album also features 18-year-old violinist Myra Choo. The band commented, "There feels like no better time to release Hiss than now. The pandemic has kept us going longer than we expected, and it feels like we're close to the end of it. We've found renewed strength and confidence after years of quiet and uncertainty." On 18 May, the singles "Grieve", "Weeping Willow" and "Voiceless Choir" were released, with a music video inspired by 1970s Japanese crime films and Singaporean TV series Triple Nine and Crimewatch. Shortly before the album's release, in May, vocalist Arif announced his departure from the band due to mental health reasons, only to return in August 2024. "Hiss was a damn fine end to Arif's tenure with Wormrot," writes critic Brandon Schroer.

== Critical reception ==
The album received extremely positive reviews from music critics. Kevin Stewart-Panko of Metal Injection gave the album 10 out of 10, writing that Hiss' roots and foundation remain in grindcore, but any variation added to it is twisted and transformed to the band's advantage. Wormrot shape other genres around grind for their own purposes and to their advantage. The result is a high bar and creative advancement in a genre constrained by certain boundaries. In a review for Kerrang!, Paul Travers wrote, "The sound on Hiss is crisp and clear, sparkling with energy and allowing individual instruments to stand out. Vocalist Arif is also in brilliant form, moving from manic howls to low growls and even melodic clean vocals." German Metal Hammer critic Dominik Winter rated the album 5.5 out of 7 and compared it to the work of bands such as Napalm Death, Full of Hell or Fear Factory. According to RaduP of Metal Storm, Wormrot have a knack for creating engaging grindcore that subtly changes rhythms and structures without losing the genre's vital energy. Sputnikmusic reviewer Brendan Schroer gave the album 4.5 out of 5 and described it as "the intersection of brutality and innovation", and wrote that the band has created "a bold, experimental and inventive album that takes a stagnant genre and turns it on its head, while never forgetting where they came from."

At the end of 2022, Hiss was recognized as one of the best metal albums of the year by several reputable music publications.

== Track listing ==
No.	Title	Length
1.	"The Darkest Burden"	1:46
2.	"Broken Maze"	1:55
3.	"Behind Closed Doors"	1:28
4.	"When Talking Fails, It’s Time for Violence"	1:15
5.	"Your Dystopian Hell"	1:29
6.	"Unrecognizable"	0:10
7.	"Hatred Transcending"	1:50
8.	"Doomsayer"	0:37
9.	"Pale Moonlight"	0:44
10.	"Seizures"	2:51
11.	"Voiceless Choir"	2:35
12.	"Grieve"	1:40
13.	"Sea of Disease"	2:10
14.	"Noxious Cloud"	1:10
15.	"Shattered Faith"	0:19
16.	"Desolate Landscapes"	2:19
17.	"Spiral Eyes"	0:41
18.	"Vicious Circle"	1:06
19.	"Weeping Willow"	1:09
20.	"All Will Wither"	1:08
21.	"Glass Shards"	4:28
Total length:		32:50

== Personnel ==
Album credits as adapted from Discogs and the Hiss liner notes:

Wormrot

- Arif — vocals
- Rasyid — guitars, bass, noises
- Vijesh — drums

Additional musicians

- Myra Choo — violin

Other personnel

- Leonard Soosay — engineering, production
- Jon Chan — artwork
- Alyssa Tawin — design
