= Wormrot =

Singaporean grindcore band

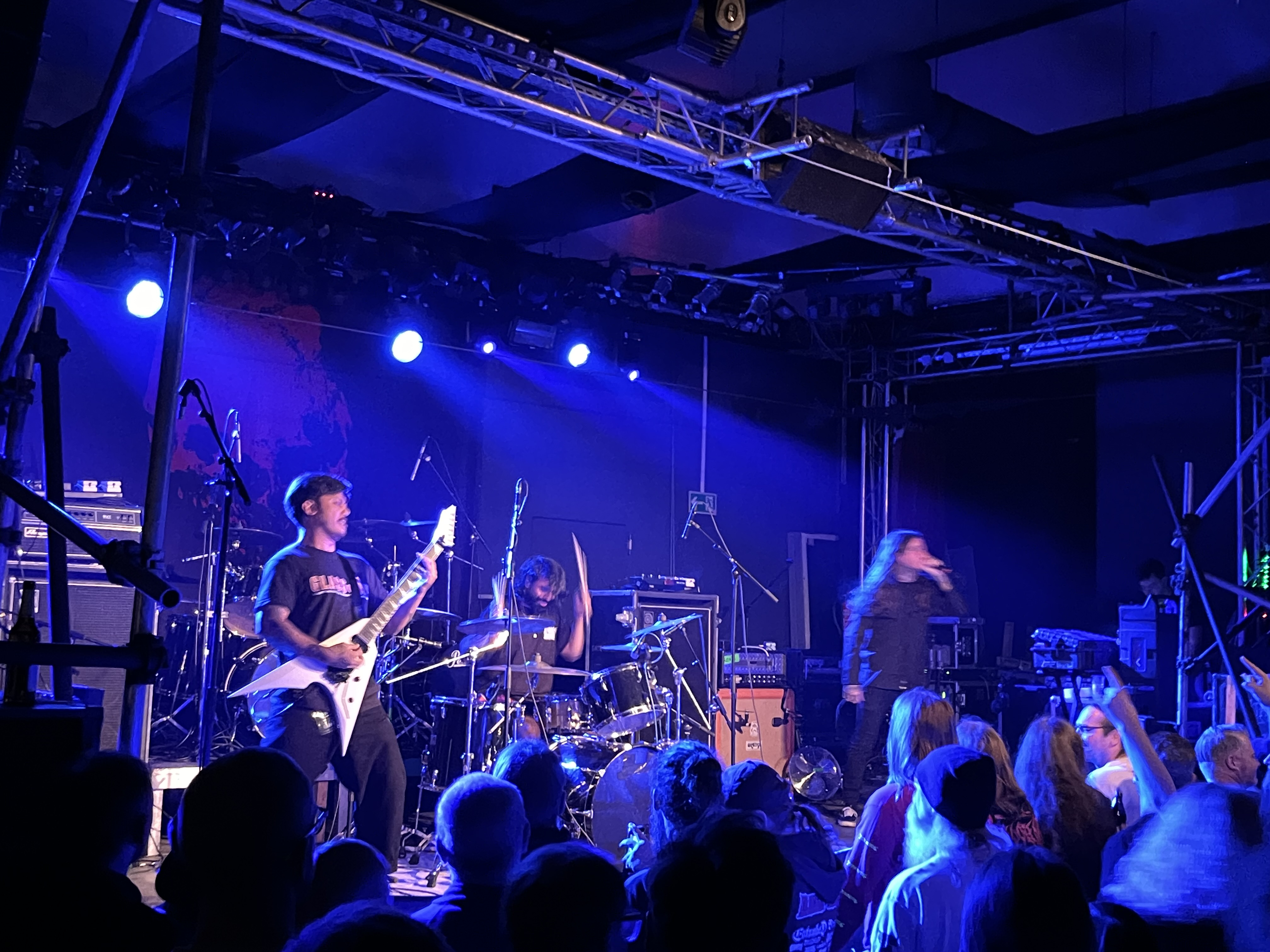
- Wormrot performing in 2024

Background information
- Origin: Singapore
- Genres: Grindcore
- Years active: 2007–2012, 2013–present
- Labels: Scrotum Jus, Scion AV, Speed Thrash Attack Distro, 41.9.30, Noise Attack, Earache
- Members: Rasyid Juraimi; Arif Rot; Fitri
- Past members: Ibrahim; Rashid Said; Halim Yusof; Vijesh Ghariwala
- Website: www.facebook.com/wormrot

Wormrot is a Singaporean grindcore band that formed in 2007, immediately after the founding members had completed their mandatory two years of national service. The band have released four studio albums to date, as well as a number of EPs and split releases with other bands. Since 2010, the band has been signed to Earache Records. They have been described as one of the top 10 grindcore bands by OC Weekly, and have toured Europe and the United States. In 2017, they became the first Singaporean act to play at the Glastonbury Festival.

== History ==
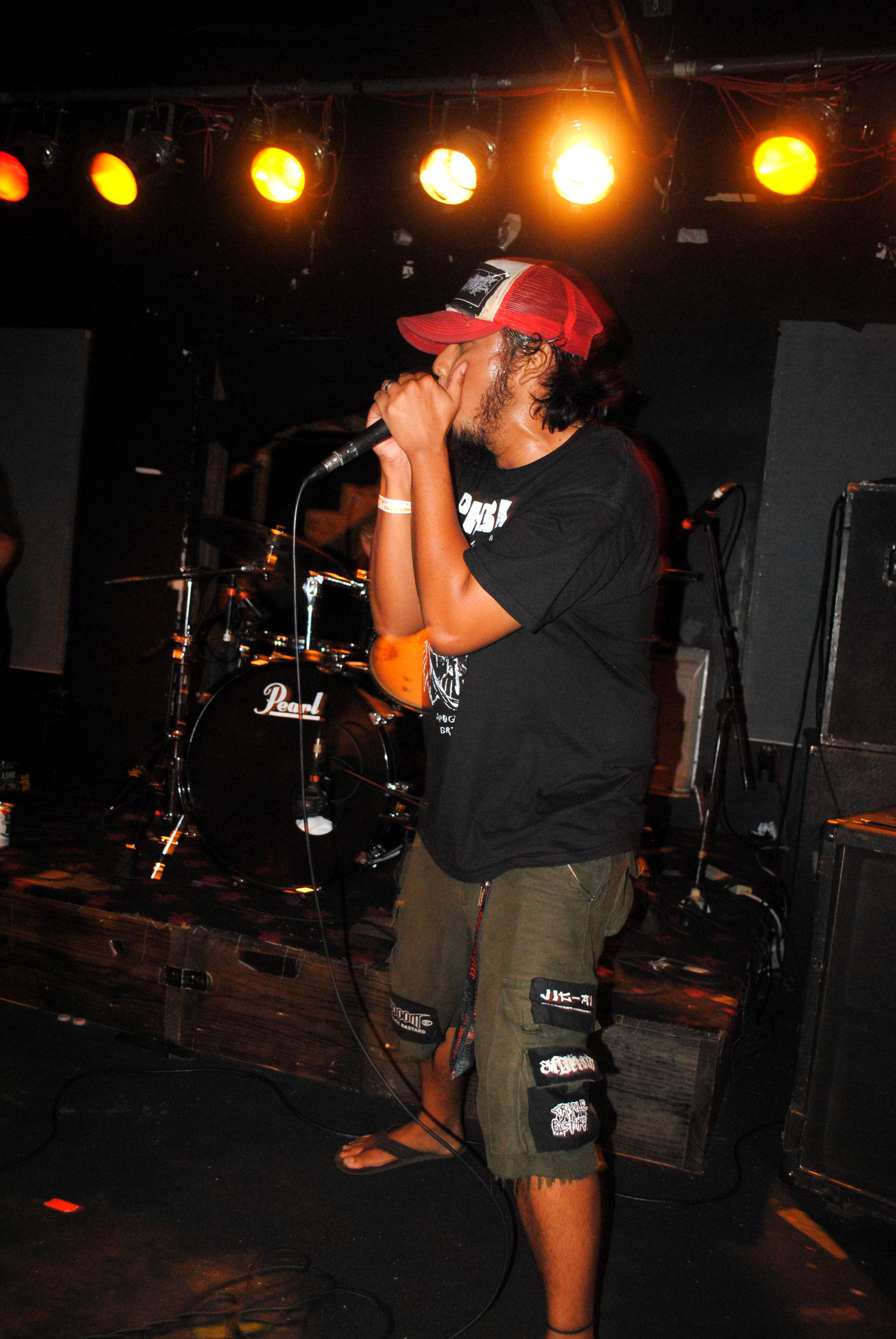
Founding vocalist Arif performing in 2010

=== Abuse and Dirge (2009–2012) ===
The band was discovered in late December 2009 by Digby Pearson, the owner of record label Earache, in a mixtape posted on the Invisible Oranges webzine. After hearing the song "Born Stupid" on the compilation, Pearson searched out and downloaded Wormrot's debut, Abuse, from file-sharing site MediaFire. Pearson was impressed with the album's quality and the band's "ambition, hard work ethic, and willingness to put [its home country] and Asian grindcore in the global map." Pearson approached the band on their Myspace page, asking if they were interested in joining Earache's roster. The band signed a recording contract with Earache in late January 2010.

Earache reissued Abuse in Europe on 13 April 2010 and in the United States on 8 June 2010. To promote the album's reissue, Wormrot toured Europe between late April and June 2010, and US between mid August and September 2010.

Their second studio album, Dirge, was released on 3 May 2011 through Earache Records. The album received positive reviews from AllMusic writer Phil Freeman and other critics. The band released an EP titled 'Noise' digitally through Scion AV on 20 September 2011. The EP was distributed as a download for free.

Wormrot went on an extended US tour in early March and April 2011 and a European tour in August–September 2011. In January 2012, they had toured Indonesia and their last European tour was in June – July 2012. A photograph and video recording from the tour's concert in France, featuring a goat in the Wormrot's audience dubbed "The Grindcore Goat" went viral on the internet. In a 17 July Facebook post, the band announced that they would be taking a break with the plan to continue writing new music and return in a few years. After concerned comments from fans and media alike, Arif later clarified "we are taking a break from TOURING".

=== Voices and side-projects (2013–2022) ===
Over a year later, in August, Wormrot returned at Baybeats Festival 2013 and performed five new songs which would appear in their next album.

On 6 April 2015, the band announced that Fitri had been removed from the band by Arif and Rasyid. The status of Fitri was unknown at the time of the announcement, with the band writing that "For the past couple of weeks, he has distanced himself from us and has remained [uncontactable]. We fear that he has gotten himself into some shit too deep, he's not comfortable to share with us. If any of his friends who are reading this have any news regarding Fitri, let him know that we're waiting for any kind of reply. Any." In June 2015, the band announced that they had recruited a new drummer, Vijesh Ghariwala, and would be continuing work on recording their third album.

On 20 July 2016, the band's third studio album, Voices, was revealed with an album trailer featuring a new song titled "Fallen Into Disuse". The band later recorded a music video for this song in support of the album's release. According to Arif, the song is about "unconscious abandonment from reality. Desperately trying to be accepted into the norm. At the very least. Failed miserably." Other songs including were also premiered in advance of the album's release, and the album was made available to stream in full on Noisey on 13 October. Voices was released on 14 October 2016 through Earache Records.

In 2017, Wormrot went on tour in Europe in February and March. They were also due to tour the US in May and June but cancelled the tour due to "the current political climate and numerous bands being turned away at US customs, we felt it was not worth the risk coming to America without the right paperwork, which is expensive." The band returned to the UK in June to perform at Glastonbury Festival 2017, becoming the first Singaporean act to do so.

The band members then turned their attentions to side projects. On 31 August, Arif, Vijesh, former member Fitri and Tiong, guitarist for Malaysian grindcore band Tools of the Trade, announced the launch of a new band Code Error. They released their debut EP, S/T, on March 12, 2018. Meanwhile, Rasyid formed Marijannah with bassist Muhd Azri, guitarist Nicholas Ng and drummer Nicholas Wong. They released their debut album, Till Marijannah, on 13 February, 2018. Wormrot toured the US and Canada in May and June with support from New York band Escuela.

=== Hiss (2022–present) ===
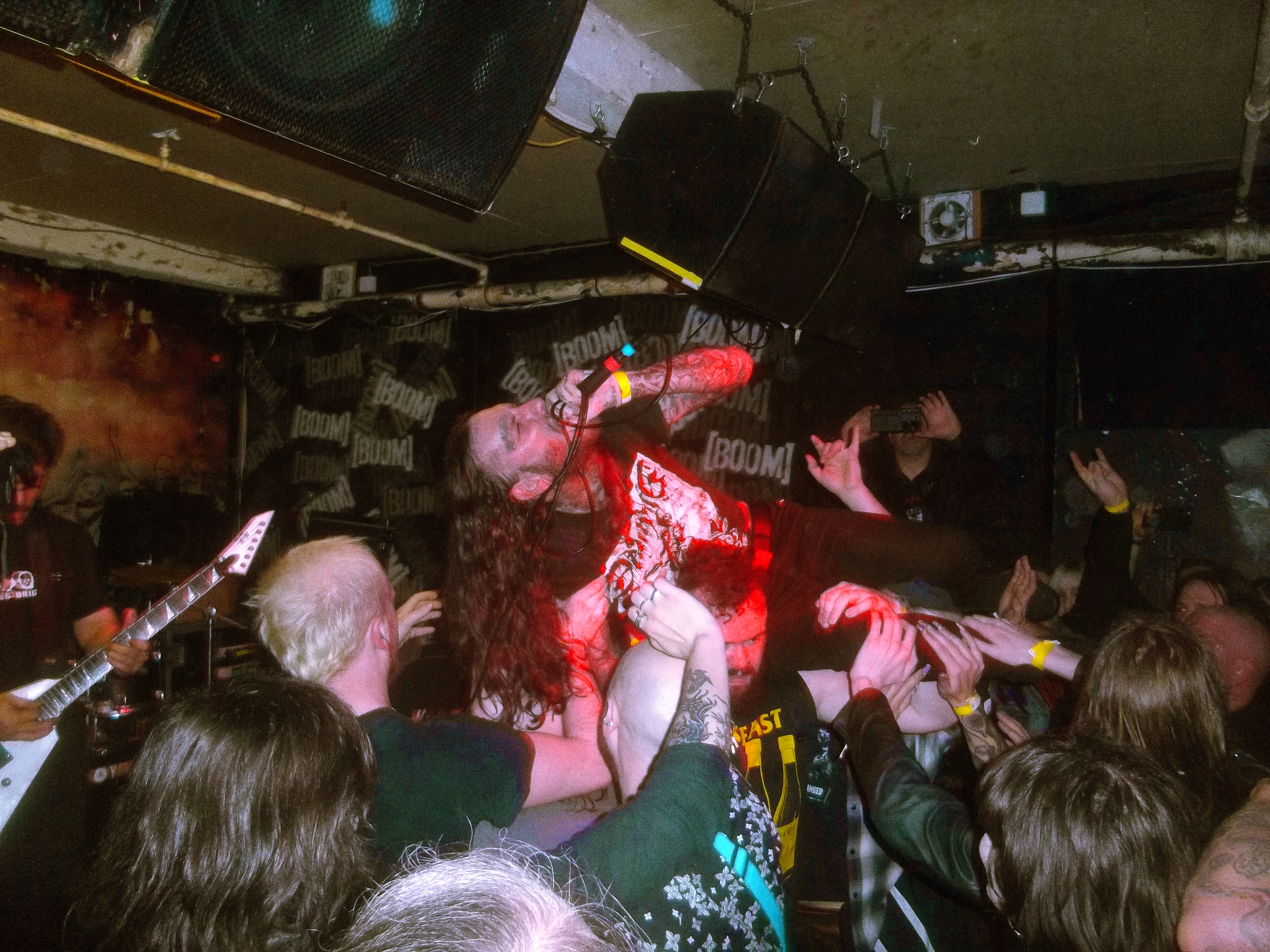
Touring vocalist Gabriel Dubko performing with Wormrot in 2023

On 16 March 2022, it was announced that Wormrot would be releasing their first album in almost six years, Hiss. Released on 8 July 2022 via Earache Records, Hiss is available on limited coloured vinyl, cassette, signed CD and digital download, and also comes as part of a new, very limited collector's cassette tape set. The album announcement was accompanied by a single release, "Behind Closed Doors". Guitarist Rasyid said of the song: "This is our fight song. No nonsense. Hit hard."

On 31 May 2022 (shortly before the release of Hiss) Wormrot announced that vocalist Arif was leaving the band, his wife Azean also simultaneously left her management position with the band as well so that the two of them could focus on their life as a family. The band then embarked on a world tour with Gabriel Dubko of Implore as a vocalist.

On July 7, 2024, the band announced that Rasyid and Vijesh have parted ways, leaving Rasyid as the sole member of the band. On August 22, 2024, the band announced they were reuniting with vocalist Arif Suhaimi and drummer Fitri.

== Musical style ==
Alex Distefano of OC Weekly wrote: "To be a death metal grindcore band from a country with very strict laws such as Singapore, you have to have balls. The dudes in Wormrot definitely have balls and can back it up with their ultra brutal death grind sound, which is abusive yet absorbent, and loud yet layered in rage and textures of sounds. Using short tidbits of styles of metal, such as thrash, and even hints of old school hardcore, Wormrot destroy listeners ears and minds with their savage attack and fierce battle plan of being in your face the entire time with powerful walls of sound."

== Members ==
=== Current members ===
- Nurrasyid "Rasyid" Juraimi – guitar (2007–2012, 2013–present)
- Arif Suhaimi – vocals (2007–2012, 2013–2022, 2024–present)
- Fitri Hamid – drums (2007, 2008–2012, 2013–2015, 2024–present)

=== Former members ===
- Halim Yusof – bass (2007)
- Rasid A. Said – drums (2007)
- Ibrahim – drums (2008)
- Vijesh Ghariwala – drums (2015–2024)

=== Touring members ===
- Gabriel Dubko – vocals (2022–2024)

== Discography ==
Studio albums

- Abuse (2009)
- Dirge (2011)
- Voices (2016)
- Hiss (2022)

EPs

- Demo (2007)
- Dead (2008)
- Flexi Disc: Decibel (2011)
- Noise (2011)

Splits

- Wormrot (SG) / Diseptic (GRE) Split Tape (2008)
- Wormrot (SG) / I Abhor (US) Split CD (2010)

Compilations

- V/A Fist of Fury compilation CD (2007)
- V/A Silence Sucks compilation CD (2007)
- Left to Rot (2024)

Live Albums

- TNT (2025)
