= Voices (Wormrot album) =

Studio album by Wormrot
- Released: October 14, 2016
- Recorded: 2016 at Inversion Studios
- Genre: Grindcore
- Length: 25:56
- Label: Earache
- Producer: Cedric Chew

Wormrot chronology
Dirge (2011)	Voices (2016)	Hiss (2022)

Professional ratings
Review scores
Source	Rating
AllMusic	4/5 stars
Exclaim!	7/10 stars
Metal Injection	10/10 stars

Voices is the third full-length album by Singaporean grindcore band Wormrot. It was released on October 14, 2016 on Earache Records.

== Track listing ==
No.	Title	Length
1.	"Blockhead Fuck Off"	1:06
2.	"Hollow Roots"	0:56
3.	"Exit Fear"	0:42
4.	"God's in His Heaven"	1:03
5.	"Oblivious Mess"	1:23
6.	"Descending Into the Unknown"	0:50
7.	"Dead Wrong"	0:08
8.	"Fallen Into Disuse"	1:19
9.	"The 1st World Syndrome"	1:19
10.	"Shallow Standards"	0:52
11.	"Fake Moral Machine"	1:11
12.	"Forced Siege"	1:17
13.	"Take Aim"	1:12
14.	"Still Irrelevant"	0:05
15.	"Eternal Sunshine of the Spotless Grind"	1:00
16.	"Compassion is Dead"	2:48
17.	"Buried the Sun"	2:44
18.	"Defaced"	0:59
19.	"The Face of Disgrace"	1:14
20.	"Outworn"	3:48
