= Biquette =

Rescued factory milking goat

Biquette (French lit. 'young female goat'), also known as Biquette de Mauriac, the Grindcore Goat or the Punk Rock Goat (c. 2003 – December 2013), was a rescued factory milking goat who was photographed in the audience of punk rock and heavy metal concerts and became viral on the internet.

== Early life ==
According to Flo, Biquette's caretaker at the French communal farm Ferme de Mauriac, the goat spent her first five years (c. 2003–2008) at a milking factory before being handed over to Mauriac because "it was cheaper than a slaughterhouse".

== Life at Ferme de Mauriac ==
Biquette lived on a French communal farm with a DIY music space, and was an avid concert attendee. In early 2012, photos showed the goat in the front row of a concert by Singaporean grindcore band Wormrot. BuzzFeed dubbed her the "Punk Rock Goat", and Metal Insider called her photo "one of the best images in metal". According to Wormrot's manager, Biquette was very tame and followed the band around "like a dog". Biquette's caretaker Flo said in an interview that the goat loved concerts and other gatherings of people and theorized that she liked the vibrations of the wooden floor caused by the live music.

Biquette loved to steal and consume cigarettes and cigarette butts, alcohol, and leftover paint and oil from the bottoms of cans.

== Death ==
On 9 December 2013, Biquette's Facebook fan page reported the goat's death, with Flo clarifying in a January 2014 interview that the cause of death was "a big mystery" and adding that given the 20-year average lifespan of a milking goat, Biquette "burned the candle at both ends" during her 10 years of life. However, Saanen goats, which it seems likely she was, are reported to have a lifespan range of 9–15 years.

== References in other media ==
- In Deadlock, the hero Billy wields a gun named "Biquette", which is a direct reference to Biquette's title as the Punk Rock Goat.
