= Châtaigneraie =

Natural region in France

Location of La Châtaigneraie (in light blue) in the Auvergne region

Châtaigneraie (French pronunciation: [ʃatɛɲʁɛ]; Occitan: Castanhau), also called Châtaigneraie cantalienne, is a natural region in France located in Auvergne, southwest of the Cantal department.

== Geography ==
=== Location ===
Châtaigneraie extends beyond the boundaries of the Cantal department to the south, reaching towards the Lot and Aveyron, with a distinct separation marked by the Lot Valley. It continues from the Cantal mountains and borders the Carladès to the east. The region is adjacent to the Viadène to the south, the Limargue to the west, and the Xaintrie and Mauriacois to the north.

It consists of schist and granite plateaus, forming a landscape of rounded summits deeply carved by the hydrographic network. In this crystalline bedrock, the interfluves, composed of interwoven streams, are cultivated and inhabited, as are the summit areas, while the steep slopes are forested.

=== Topography ===
Châtaigneraie consists of two main basins: the Maurs basin and the Veinazès basin, with altitudes ranging from 250 to 800 metres. In Maurs, the southern aspect becomes more pronounced, and the climate becomes very mild. There are also two other sub-regions within the Châtaigneraie: the Ségala lotois to the west and the Cantalès to the north. The Aurillac basin, while sometimes included in the Châtaigneraie, is considered a separate geographic entity.

== History ==
=== Toponymy ===
Situated on the Gâtine hills, La Châtaigneraie began as a sacred site centered around a spring where ancient people worshipped the god Hercules, known as "Montercle." In the 4th century, early Christians replaced the temple with a chapel dedicated to Saint Christopher. The Chasteigner family built a fortified castle on the hillside, which led to the parish, originally known as "Saint Christophe du Bois", being renamed Castaneria, the precursor to its modern name, "La Châtaigneraie."

=== Medieval era ===
For over three centuries, the Chasteigner family ruled La Châtaigneraie. The most notable family member, Gislebert de Chasteigner, mentioned in 1069, and his descendants formed alliances with prominent families and supported monasteries. In the 14th century, the Chasteigner lineage ended with the death of Thibault VI, who left only two daughters married into the de Vivonne family. The de Vivonne family gained prominence in La Châtaigneraie, with Renault I de Vivonne serving as the seneschal of Poitou.

During the religious wars, La Châtaigneraie suffered greatly. The church of Saint Christophe du Bois was looted, and in 1623, Charles de Vivonne founded a Jacobin convent on its ruins. The chapel of the castle, dedicated to Saint John, became the parish church. After the death of the last de Vivonne lord, their heiress, Andrée de Vivonne, married François, Duke of La Rochefoucauld, who sold the estate in 1651. The property changed hands several times until it ended up with the Asnières family by the end of the Ancien Régime.

In 1698, the king established a royal court in La Châtaigneraie, the bailiwick of Vouvant.

== Industry ==
The Châtaigneraie is named for its chestnut production. Additionally, the area retains many signs of historical activities related to walnut production (Sénezergues) and buckwheat (Boisset).

While intensive livestock farming is not possible due to the rugged terrain, farmers traditionally raised goats and made wine (in the Vieillevie and Le Fel areas). Today, dairy cattle farming supports the production of AOC Cantal cheese (Saint-Mamet), and pig farming supplies the charcuterie industry (Le Rouget, Cayrols, Laroquebrou, Parlan, etc.).
