= Ayrens =

Commune in Auvergne-Rhône-Alpes, France

- Commune
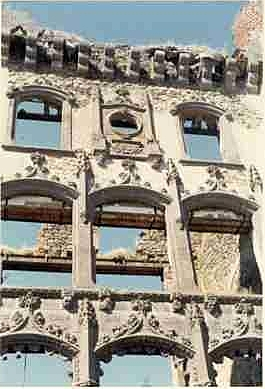
- Ruins of the chateau of Clavières-Ayrens
- Location of Ayrens
- Location within France Location within Auvergne-Rhône-Alpes
- Coordinates: 44°59′08″N 2°19′40″E
- Country: France
- Region: Auvergne-Rhône-Alpes
- Department: Cantal
- Arrondissement: Aurillac
- Canton: Saint-Paul-des-Landes
- Intercommunality: CA Aurillac Agglomération

Government
  - Mayor (2020–2026): Hubert Bonhommet
- Area^{1}: 25.5 km^{2} (9.8 sq mi)
- Highest elevation: 729 m (2,392 ft)
- Lowest elevation: 517 m (1,696 ft)
- Population (2023): 614
  - Density: 24.1/km^{2} (62.4/sq mi)
- Time zone: UTC+01:00 (CET)
  - Summer (DST): UTC+02:00 (CEST)
- INSEE/Postal code: 15016 /15250
- ^{1} French Land Register data, which excludes lakes, ponds, glaciers > 1 km^{2} (0.386 sq mi or 247 acres) and river estuaries.

Ayrens is a commune in the Cantal department in the Auvergne-Rhône-Alpes region of south-central France.

== Geography ==
Ayrens is located some 15 km north-west of Aurillac and 5 km north of Saint-Paul-des-Landes. Access to the commune is by road D52 from Teissières-de-Cornet in the south-east which passes through the village and continues west then south to join the D120 north-east of Laroquebrou. The D53 comes from Saint-Paul-des-Landes in the south and also passes through the village before continuing north-east to join the D6 near the border of the commune. The D352 goes north from the village to join the D53 north of the commune. Apart from the village there are the hamlets of:

- Les Baraques
- Le Bos Niac
- Boutonnet
- Cels
- Ciels
- Colin
- La Croix-Longue
- Jammes
- Le Mont
- Renac
- Selves
- Serieys
- Tannuies
- La Tronque

The commune is mainly farmland with extensive forests in the northern part.

The Ruisseau du Meyrou flows from the south-east through the south of the commune forming a small part of the western border before continuing north to join the Eize. The Ruisseau d'Ayrens rises in the east of the commune and flows west through the village to the join the Ruisseau du Meyrou on the western border of the commune. The Ruisseau de Braulle flows from the west of the commune through the centre north of the village to join the Ruisseau du Meyrou on the western border. The Ruisseau de Praniac rises in the north of the commune and forms part of the northern border as it flows west to join the Eize.

== History ==
Ayrens commune lies on the Paris meridian and on the 45th parallel north (45°0′0″N 2°20′14.025″E). It was therefore the fundamental point for the Bonne projection used in the Carte d'État-Major (General Staff Map) in the 19th century.

== Administration ==
List of Successive Mayors

Mayors from the French Revolution to 1935

From	To	Name
1790	1793	Louis Linthilac
1793	1793	François Maleprade
1793	1795	Louis Dejour
1795	1796	Guillaume Lafon
1796	1798	René Andrieu
1798	1799	Pierre Lallier
1799	1802	Jean Vabret
1802	1802	Louis Bonhomme
1802	1803	François Maleprade
1803	1804	Antoine Maisonobe
1805	1805	François Capelle
1805	1806	Antoine Maisonobe
1806	1808	Charles Devèze
1808	1816	Antoine Bonhomme
1816	1820	Salvenie de Montal
1820	1848	Antoine de Montal
1848	1852	Durand Lafon
1852	1857	Louis Rengade
1857	1863	Antoine Deconquand
1863	1876	Jean Rengade
1876	1888	Emile Gazard
1888	1896	Amédée Rebeyrols
1896	1904	Antoine Mallet
1904	1910	Jean Léon Reniac
1910	1920	Pierre Vidal
1920	1933	Louis Maisonobe
1933	1935	François Veschambres

Mayors from 1935

From	To	Name	Party	Position
1935	1945	Pierre Poux		
1943	1947	François Veschambres		
1947	1958	Adrien Prunet		
1958	1971	Albert Moissinac		
1971	2008	Jean Chanut		
2008	2014	Robert Wallez		
2014	2020	Philippe Granier		

== Demography ==
The inhabitants of the commune are known as Ayrencois or Ayrencoises in French.

Historical population

Year	Pop.	±% p.a.
1793	1,390	—
1800	1,240	−1.62%
1806	1,135	−1.46%
1821	1,151	+0.09%
1831	1,191	+0.34%
1836	1,164	−0.46%
1841	1,183	+0.32%
1846	1,140	−0.74%
1851	1,148	+0.14%
1856	1,117	−0.55%
1861	1,001	−2.17%
1866	1,005	+0.08%
1872	990	−0.25%
1876	962	−0.71%
1881	960	−0.04%
1886	965	+0.10%
1891	1,061	+1.91%
1896	912	−2.98%
1901	960	+1.03%

Year	Pop.	±% p.a.
1906	852	−2.36%
1911	838	−0.33%
1921	740	−1.24%
1926	751	+0.30%
1931	702	−1.34%
1936	642	−1.77%
1946	632	−0.16%
1954	569	−1.30%
1962	513	−1.29%
1968	505	−0.26%
1975	444	−1.82%
1982	544	+2.94%
1990	545	+0.02%
1999	494	−1.09%
2007	551	+1.37%
2012	580	+1.03%
2017	652	+2.37%
2023	614	−1.00%

Source: EHESS and INSEE

== Sites and monuments ==
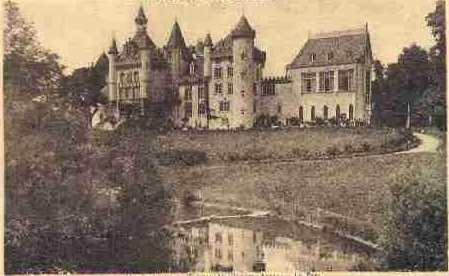
The Chateau of Clavières in 1900

- The Château de Clavières, built in the Troubadour style, was burnt down on 25 May 1936 and left in ruins.
- The Parc de Clavières is registered as an historical monument.
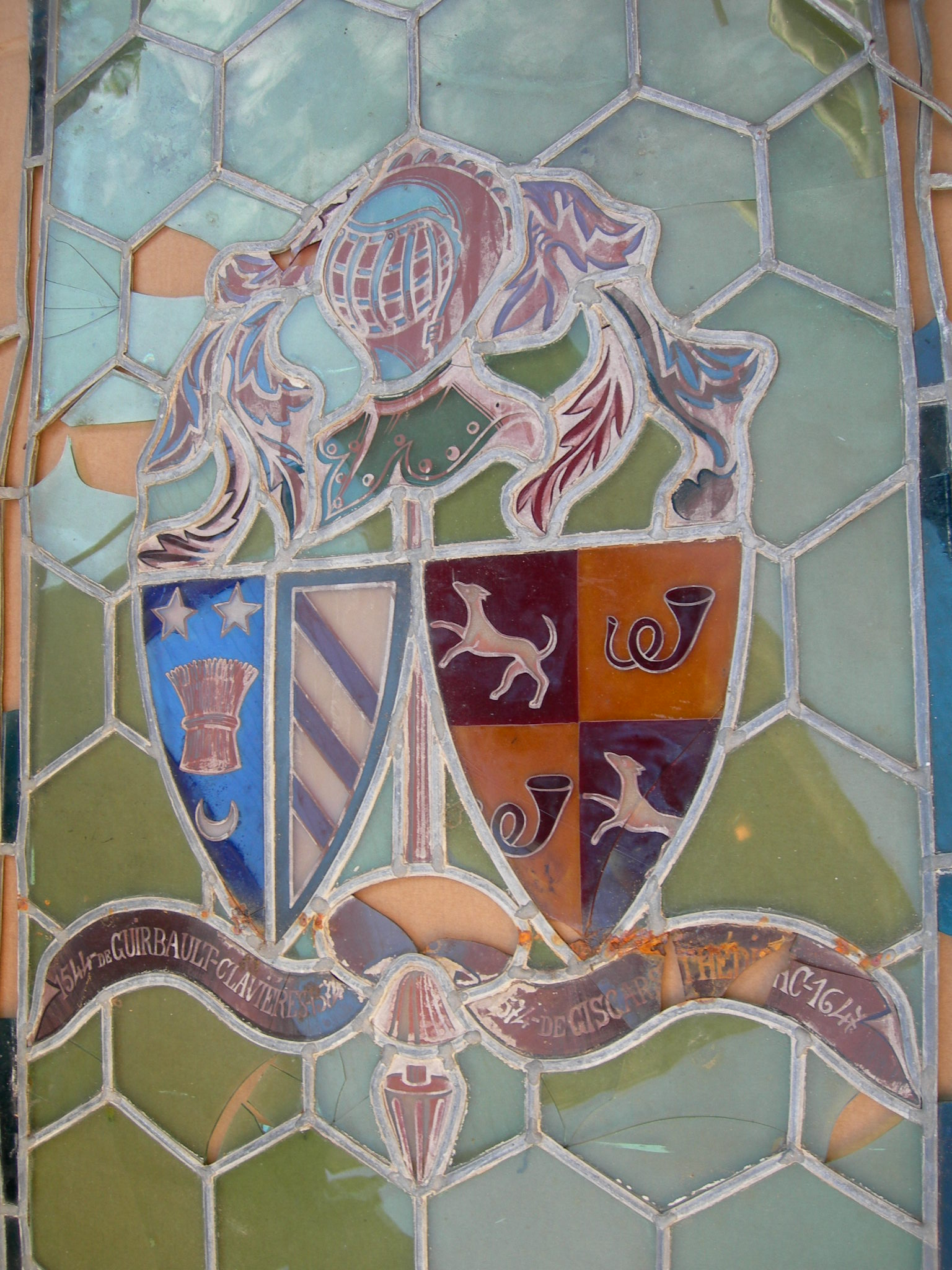
Stained glass in the Chateau of Clavières

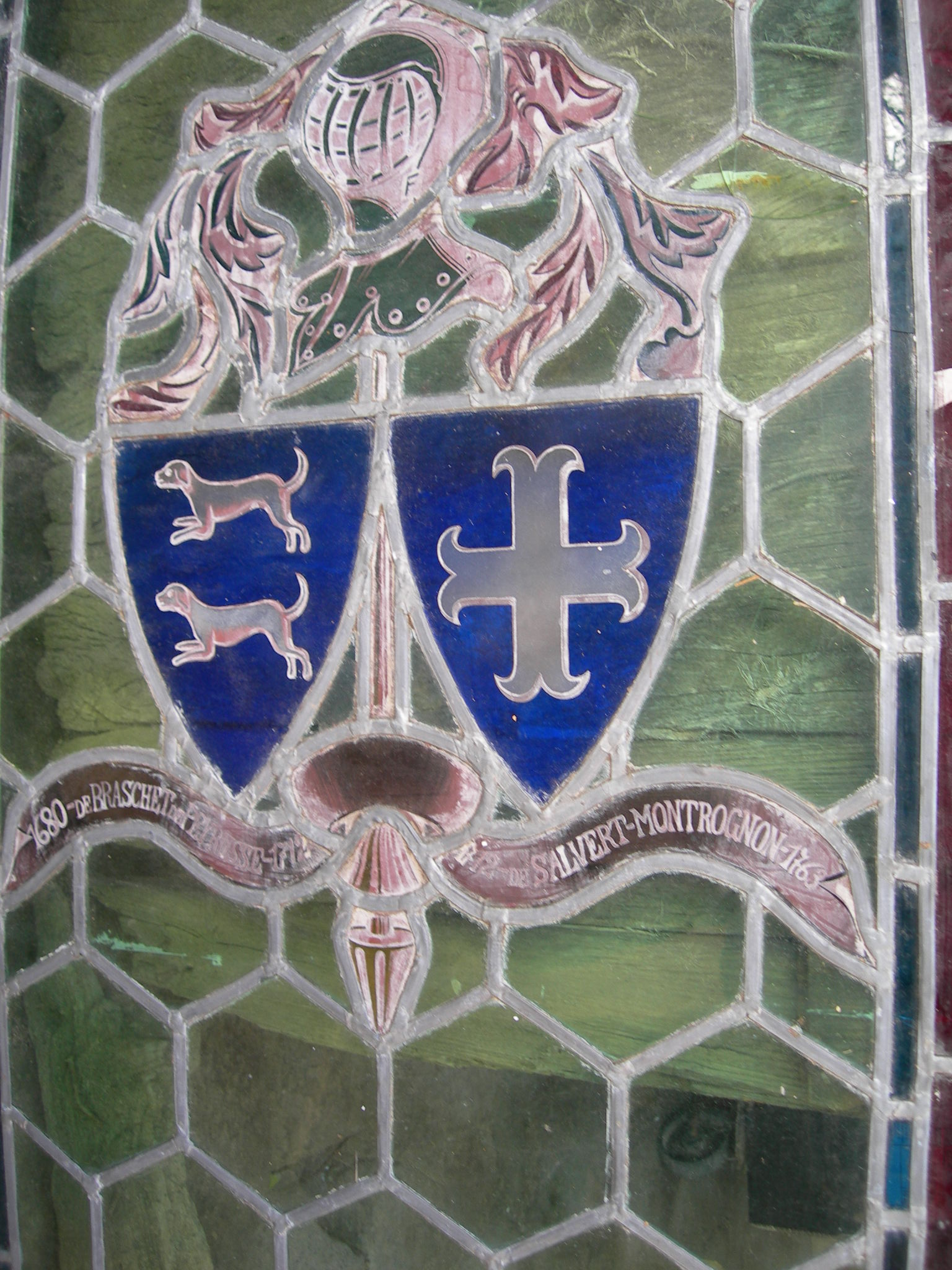
Stained glass in the Chateau of Clavières

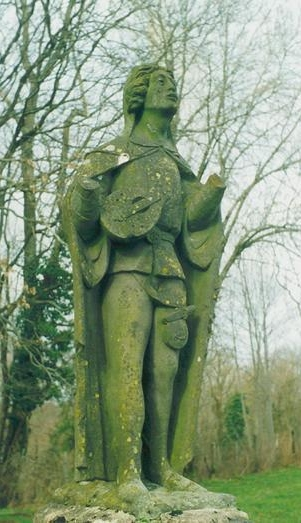
Statue of a Troubadour at the Chateau
- The intersection of the Paris meridian and the 45th parallel north is in a field where four trees were planted on the occasion of the celebration of the Méridienne verte (Green Meridian) on 14 July 2000. The trees are arranged in a square whose vertices are directed toward the four cardinal points, which allows the determination of the exact intersection point.

== Notable people linked to the commune ==
- Cardinal Guillaume de La Jugie, restored then lived in the Château of Angouste in the 14th century.
- Félix de la Salle de Rochemaure (1856–1915), French félibrige writer, lived in the Château of Clavières.
- Jean Léon Sanis (Ayrens 1804-?), geographer, professor at the Lycée Louis-le-Grand.

== See also ==
- Occitania
- Félibrige
- Pope Sylvester II
- Auvergne (province), the historical independent county and later French province
- Communes of the Cantal department
