= Rouffiac =

Rouffiac may refer to the following places in France:

- Rouffiac, Cantal, a commune in the department of Cantal
- Rouffiac, Charente, a commune in the department of Charente
- Rouffiac, Charente-Maritime, a commune in the department of Charente-Maritime
- Rouffiac, Tarn, a commune in the department of Tarn
- Rouffiac-d'Aude, a commune in the department of Aude
- Rouffiac-des-Corbières, a commune in the department of Aude
- Rouffiac-Tolosan, a commune in the department of Haute-Garonne
- Chateau de Rouffiac, Angoisse, Dordogne
