= Pers, Cantal =

Pers
- Part of Le Rouget-Pers
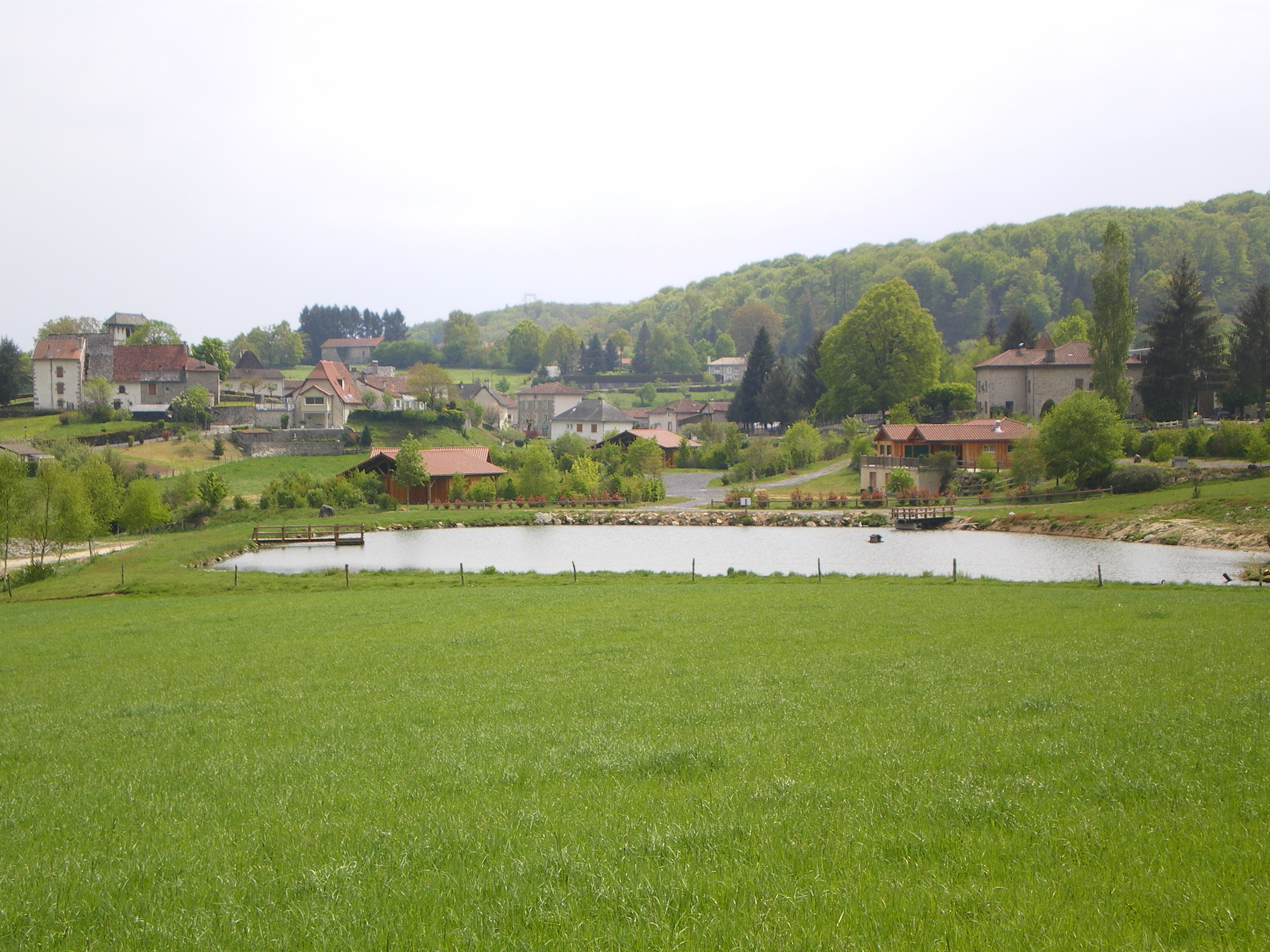
- A general view of Pers

- Coat of arms
- Location of Pers
- Location within France Location within Auvergne-Rhône-Alpes
- Coordinates: 44°53′17″N 2°14′22″E
- Country: France
- Region: Auvergne-Rhône-Alpes
- Department: Cantal
- Arrondissement: Aurillac
- Canton: Saint-Mamet-la-Salvetat
- Commune: Le Rouget-Pers
- Area^{1}: 16.05 km^{2} (6.20 sq mi)
- Elevation: 570 m (1,870 ft)
- Highest elevation: 657 m (2,156 ft)
- Lowest elevation: 516 m (1,693 ft)
- Population (2023): 273
  - Density: 17.0/km^{2} (44.1/sq mi)
- Time zone: UTC+01:00 (CET)
  - Summer (DST): UTC+02:00 (CEST)
- Postal code: 15290
- ^{1} French Land Register data, which excludes lakes, ponds, glaciers > 1 km^{2} (0.386 sq mi or 247 acres) and river estuaries.

Pers (French pronunciation: [pɛʁs]; Occitan: Pers) is a former commune in the Cantal department in south-central France. On 1 January 2016, it was merged into the new commune Le Rouget-Pers.

It is on the edge of the Châtaigneraie and near the Ségala. It is also adjacent to the lake of Saint-Étienne-Cantalès, a large body of water formed by the damming of the river Cère for hydro electric purposes.

To attract visitors from nearby towns, the village has a well-maintained go-cart track that is said to regularly hosts championship races.

As well as a church and the town hall, there are two bars, and a camping site. Gites may also be rented from the farm. There are no shops.

== See also ==
- Communes of the Cantal department
