= Le Rouget =

Commune in Cantal, France

- Part of Le Rouget-Pers
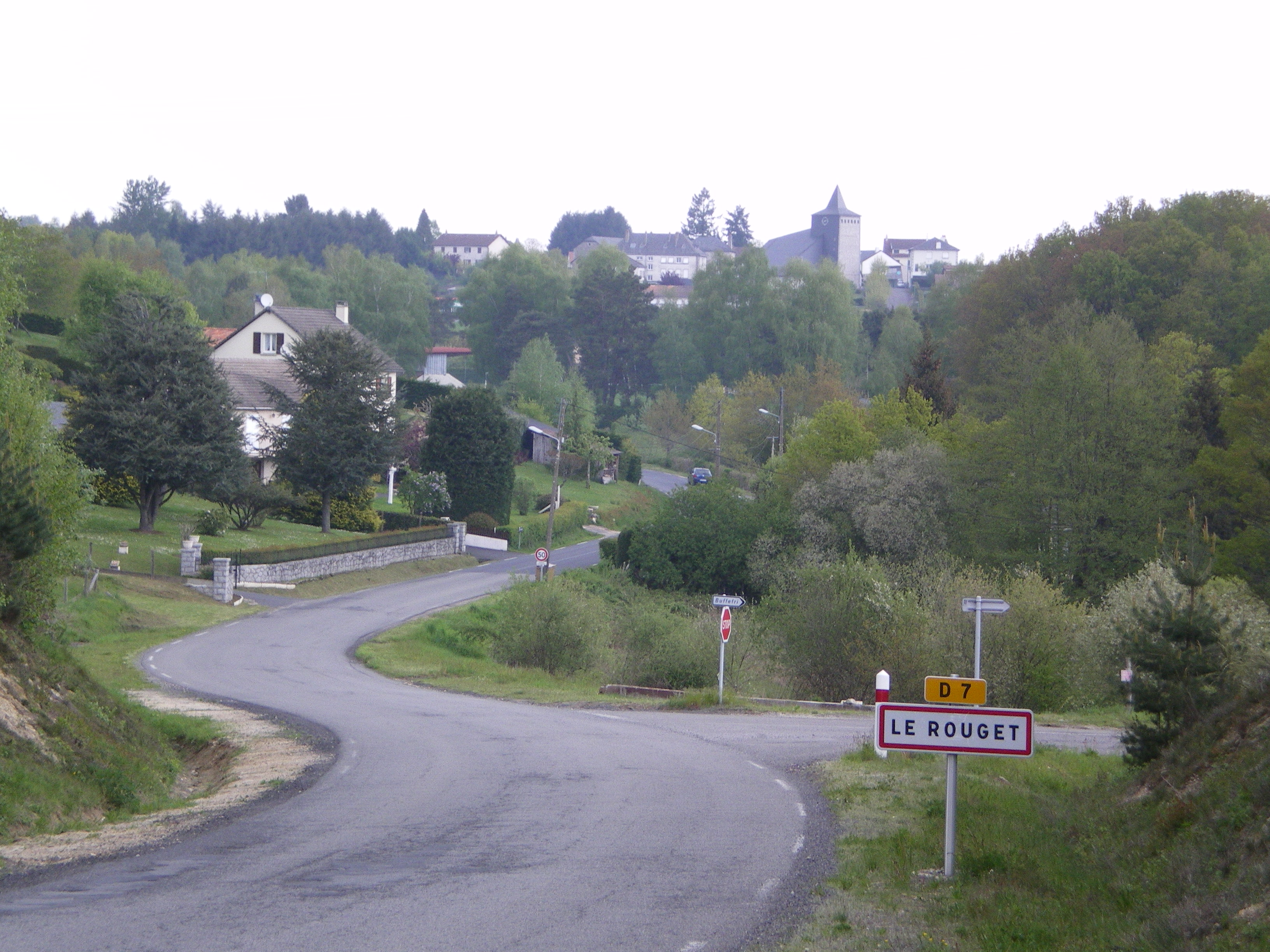
- A general view of Le Rouget
- Location of Le Rouget
- Location within France Location within Auvergne-Rhône-Alpes
- Coordinates: 44°51′19″N 2°13′57″E
- Country: France
- Region: Auvergne-Rhône-Alpes
- Department: Cantal
- Arrondissement: Aurillac
- Canton: Saint-Mamet-la-Salvetat
- Commune: Le Rouget-Pers
- Area^{1}: 8.23 km^{2} (3.18 sq mi)
- Elevation: 600 m (2,000 ft)
- Highest elevation: 665 m (2,182 ft)
- Lowest elevation: 555 m (1,821 ft)
- Population (2022): 1,017
  - Density: 124/km^{2} (320/sq mi)
- Time zone: UTC+01:00 (CET)
  - Summer (DST): UTC+02:00 (CEST)
- Postal code: 15290
- ^{1} French Land Register data, which excludes lakes, ponds, glaciers > 1 km^{2} (0.386 sq mi or 247 acres) and river estuaries.

Le Rouget (French pronunciation: [lə ʁuʒɛ]; Languedocien: Lo Roget) is a former commune in the département of Cantal in south-central France. On 1 January 2016, it was merged into the new commune Le Rouget-Pers.

Le Rouget, having grown from a hamlet as a result of coming of the railway, will not be found on many 19th-century maps. It was not granted commune status (and, with it, the right to elect a mayor of its own) until September 1945, but is today a more important commercial and employment centre than the nearby historic cantonal centres of Saint-Mamet-la-Salvetat and Laroquebrou, although it lacks their architectural and historical interest.

A market is held every Sunday morning.

== Population ==
Historical population
Year	Pop.	±% p.a.
1946	600	—
1962	834	+2.08%
1968	918	+1.61%
1975	963	+0.69%
1982	902	−0.93%
1990	910	+0.11%
1999	901	−0.11%
2022	1,017	+0.53%
Source: EHESS and INSEE (2022)

== See also ==
- Communes of the Cantal department
