= Glénat =

Glénat may refer to:

- Glénat, Cantal, a commune in France
- Glénat Éditions, a French publisher
