= Le Rouget-Pers =

Commune in Auvergne-Rhône-Alpes, France

- Commune
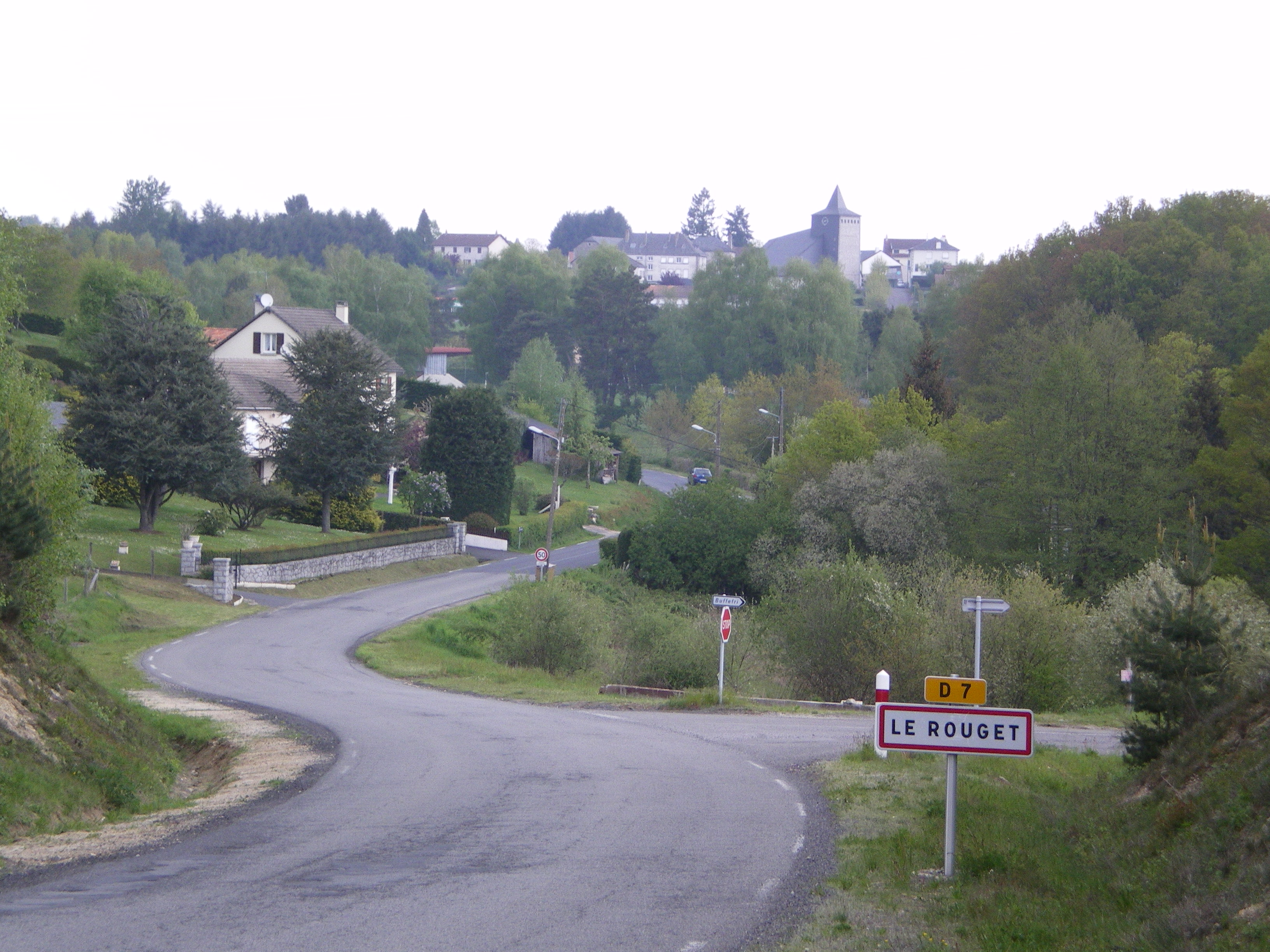
- A general view of Le Rouget
- Location of Le Rouget-Pers
- Location within France Location within Auvergne-Rhône-Alpes
- Coordinates: 44°51′18″N 2°13′59″E
- Country: France
- Region: Auvergne-Rhône-Alpes
- Department: Cantal
- Arrondissement: Aurillac
- Canton: Saint-Paul-des-Landes

Government
  - Mayor (2020–2026): Gilles Combelle
- Area^{1}: 24.28 km^{2} (9.37 sq mi)
- Population (2023): 1,297
  - Density: 53.42/km^{2} (138.4/sq mi)
- Time zone: UTC+01:00 (CET)
  - Summer (DST): UTC+02:00 (CEST)
- INSEE/Postal code: 15268 /15290
- ^{1} French Land Register data, which excludes lakes, ponds, glaciers > 1 km^{2} (0.386 sq mi or 247 acres) and river estuaries.

Le Rouget-Pers (French pronunciation: [lə ʁuʒɛ pɛʁs]; Occitan: Lo Roget e Pers) is a commune in the Cantal department of southern France. The municipality was established on 1 January 2016 and consists of the former communes of Le Rouget and Pers.

== See also ==
- Communes of the Cantal department
