= Saint-Étienne-Cantalès =

Commune in Auvergne-Rhône-Alpes, France

- Commune
- Location of Saint-Étienne-Cantalès
- Location within France Location within Auvergne-Rhône-Alpes
- Coordinates: 44°56′55″N 2°13′28″E
- Country: France
- Region: Auvergne-Rhône-Alpes
- Department: Cantal
- Arrondissement: Aurillac
- Canton: Saint-Paul-des-Landes

Government
  - Mayor (2020–2026): Patrick Giraud
- Area^{1}: 11.21 km^{2} (4.33 sq mi)
- Elevation: 518 m (1,699 ft)
- Highest elevation: 604 m (1,982 ft)
- Lowest elevation: 452 m (1,483 ft)
- Population (2023): 127
  - Density: 11.3/km^{2} (29.3/sq mi)
- Time zone: UTC+01:00 (CET)
  - Summer (DST): UTC+02:00 (CEST)
- INSEE/Postal code: 15182 /15150
- ^{1} French Land Register data, which excludes lakes, ponds, glaciers > 1 km^{2} (0.386 sq mi or 247 acres) and river estuaries.

Saint-Étienne-Cantalès (French pronunciation: [sɛ̃.t‿etjɛn kɑ̃talɛs]; Occitan: Sant Estèfe de Cantalés) is a commune in the Cantal department in south-central France.

== Population ==
Historical population
| Year | Pop. | ±% p.a. |
|---|---|---|
| 1968 | 221 | — |
| 1975 | 183 | −2.66% |
| 1982 | 172 | −0.88% |
| 1990 | 188 | +1.12% |
| 1999 | 157 | −1.98% |
| 2007 | 134 | −1.96% |
| 2012 | 139 | +0.74% |
| 2017 | 132 | −1.03% |
| 2023 | 127 | −0.64% |
Source: INSEE

== See also ==
- Communes of the Cantal department
