= Château de Clavières =

Château in Auvergne-Rhône-Alpes, France

Coordinates: 44°58′53″N 2°20′57″E

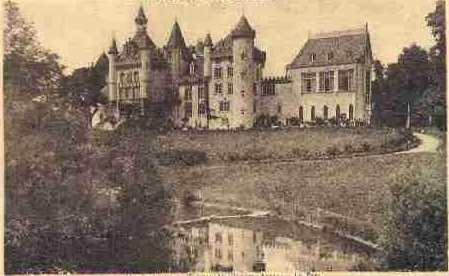
Château de Clavières

The Château de Clavières was a château in Ayrens, a commune in the Cantal département in the Auvergne region of France.

== History ==
The Château de Clavières burnt down on 25 May 1936 and was left in ruins, which after the recent sale of the site are no longer accessible. It was owned in the 19th and early 20th centuries by the Duc de la Salle de Rochemaure, a félibrige writer.
