= Canton of Saint-Paul-des-Landes =

Coordinates: 44.94°N 2.31°E

- Canton
- Situation of the canton of Saint-Paul-des-Landes in the department of Cantal
- Country: France
- Region: Auvergne-Rhône-Alpes
- Department: Cantal
- No. of communes: {{{nbcomm}}}
- Population (2023): 8,627
- INSEE code: 1513

The canton of Saint-Paul-des-Landes is an administrative division of the Cantal department, southern France. It was created at the French canton reorganisation which came into effect in March 2015. Its seat is in Saint-Paul-des-Landes.

It consists of the following communes:

1. Arnac
2. Ayrens
3. Cayrols
4. Cros-de-Montvert
5. Glénat
6. Lacapelle-Viescamp
7. Laroquebrou
8. Montvert
9. Nieudan
10. Omps
11. Parlan
12. Rouffiac
13. Le Rouget-Pers
14. Roumégoux
15. Saint-Étienne-Cantalès
16. Saint-Gérons
17. Saint-Paul-des-Landes
18. Saint-Santin-Cantalès
19. Saint-Saury
20. Saint-Victor
21. La Ségalassière
22. Siran
