= Saint-Saury =

Commune in Auvergne-Rhône-Alpes, France

- Commune
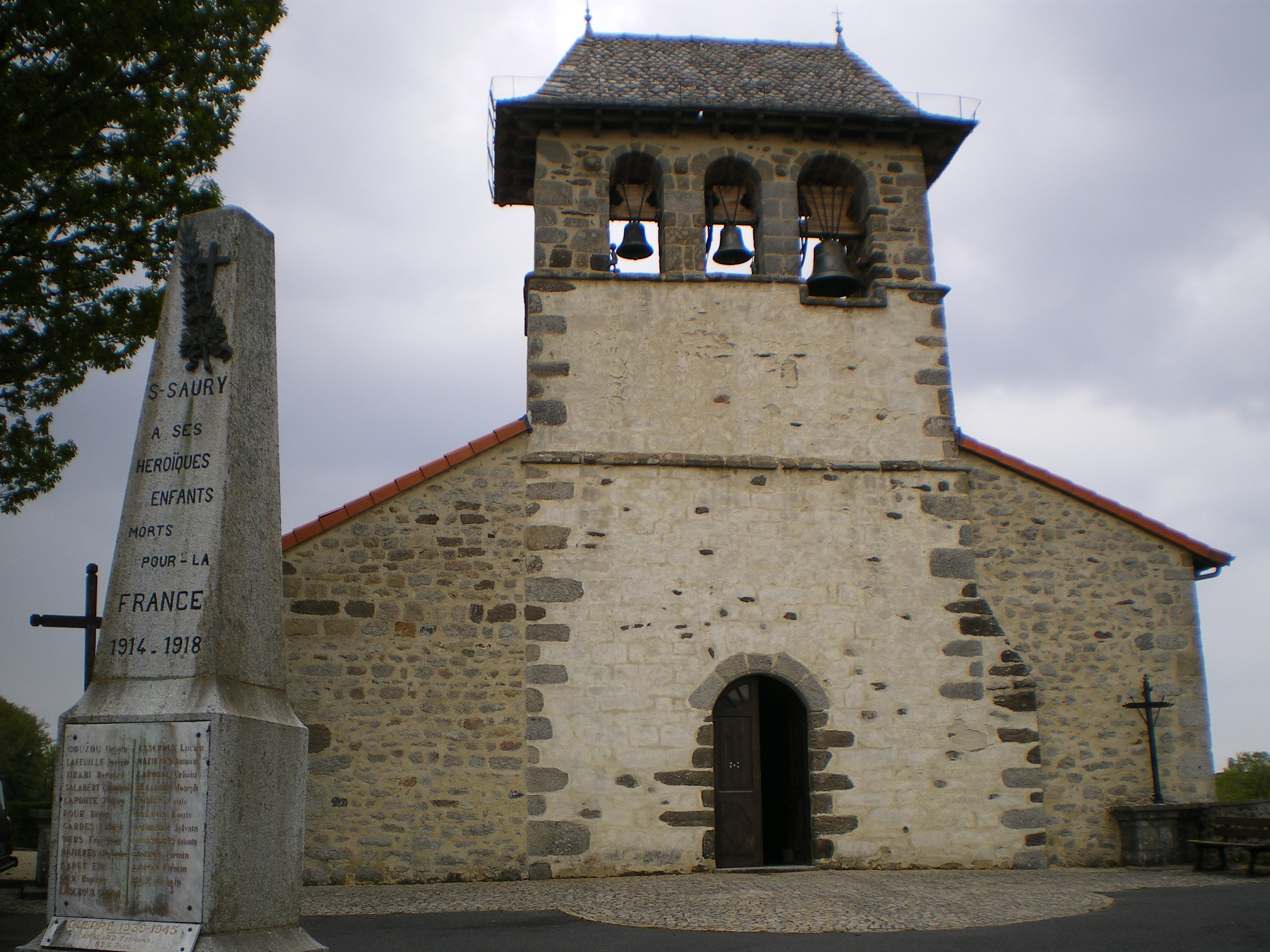
- The church in Saint-Saury

- Coat of arms
- Location of Saint-Saury
- Location within France Location within Auvergne-Rhône-Alpes
- Coordinates: 44°52′09″N 2°08′25″E
- Country: France
- Region: Auvergne-Rhône-Alpes
- Department: Cantal
- Arrondissement: Aurillac
- Canton: Saint-Paul-des-Landes

Government
  - Mayor (2020–2026): Roger Condamine
- Area^{1}: 30.11 km^{2} (11.63 sq mi)
- Elevation: 712 m (2,336 ft)
- Highest elevation: 761 m (2,497 ft)
- Lowest elevation: 574 m (1,883 ft)
- Population (2023): 183
  - Density: 6.08/km^{2} (15.7/sq mi)
- Time zone: UTC+01:00 (CET)
  - Summer (DST): UTC+02:00 (CEST)
- INSEE/Postal code: 15214 /15290
- ^{1} French Land Register data, which excludes lakes, ponds, glaciers > 1 km^{2} (0.386 sq mi or 247 acres) and river estuaries.

Saint-Saury (French pronunciation: [sɛ̃ soʁi]; Occitan: Sant Saurin) is a commune in the Cantal department in south-central France.

== Population ==
Historical population
Year	Pop.	±% p.a.
1968	314	—
1975	286	−1.33%
1982	250	−1.90%
1990	221	−1.53%
1999	187	−1.84%
2007	201	+0.91%
2012	200	−0.10%
2017	185	−1.55%
2023	183	−0.18%
Source: INSEE

== See also ==
- Communes of the Cantal department
