= Roumégoux, Cantal =

Commune in Auvergne-Rhône-Alpes, France

Roumégoux
- Commune
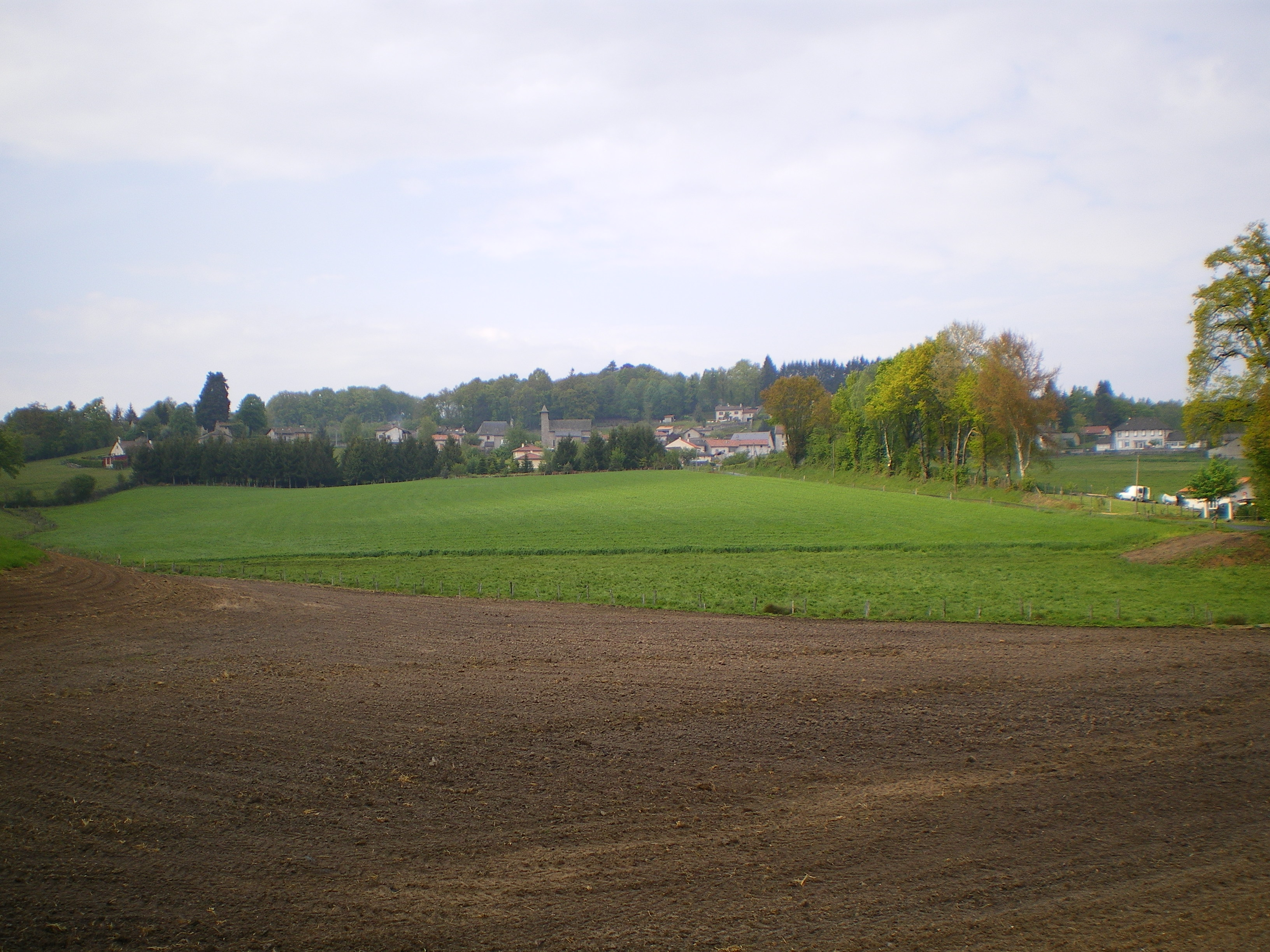
- A general view of Roumégoux

- Coat of arms
- Location of Roumégoux
- Location within France Location within Auvergne-Rhône-Alpes
- Coordinates: 44°51′27″N 2°11′57″E
- Country: France
- Region: Auvergne-Rhône-Alpes
- Department: Cantal
- Arrondissement: Aurillac
- Canton: Saint-Paul-des-Landes
- Intercommunality: Châtaigneraie Cantalienne

Government
  - Mayor (2020–2026): Christian Lacarriere
- Area^{1}: 13.29 km^{2} (5.13 sq mi)
- Elevation: 620 m (2,030 ft)
- Highest elevation: 761 m (2,497 ft)
- Lowest elevation: 579 m (1,900 ft)
- Population (2023): 336
  - Density: 25.3/km^{2} (65.5/sq mi)
- Time zone: UTC+01:00 (CET)
  - Summer (DST): UTC+02:00 (CEST)
- INSEE/Postal code: 15166 /15290
- ^{1} French Land Register data, which excludes lakes, ponds, glaciers > 1 km^{2} (0.386 sq mi or 247 acres) and river estuaries.

Roumégoux (French pronunciation: [ʁumeɡu]; Occitan: Romegós) is a commune in the Cantal department in south-central France.

== Population ==
Historical population
Year	Pop.	±% p.a.
1968	283	—
1975	229	−2.98%
1982	211	−1.16%
1990	197	−0.85%
1999	214	+0.92%
2007	242	+1.55%
2012	290	+3.69%
2017	313	+1.54%
2023	336	+1.19%
Source: INSEE

== See also ==
- Communes of the Cantal department
