= La Ségalassière =

Commune in Auvergne-Rhône-Alpes, France

- Commune
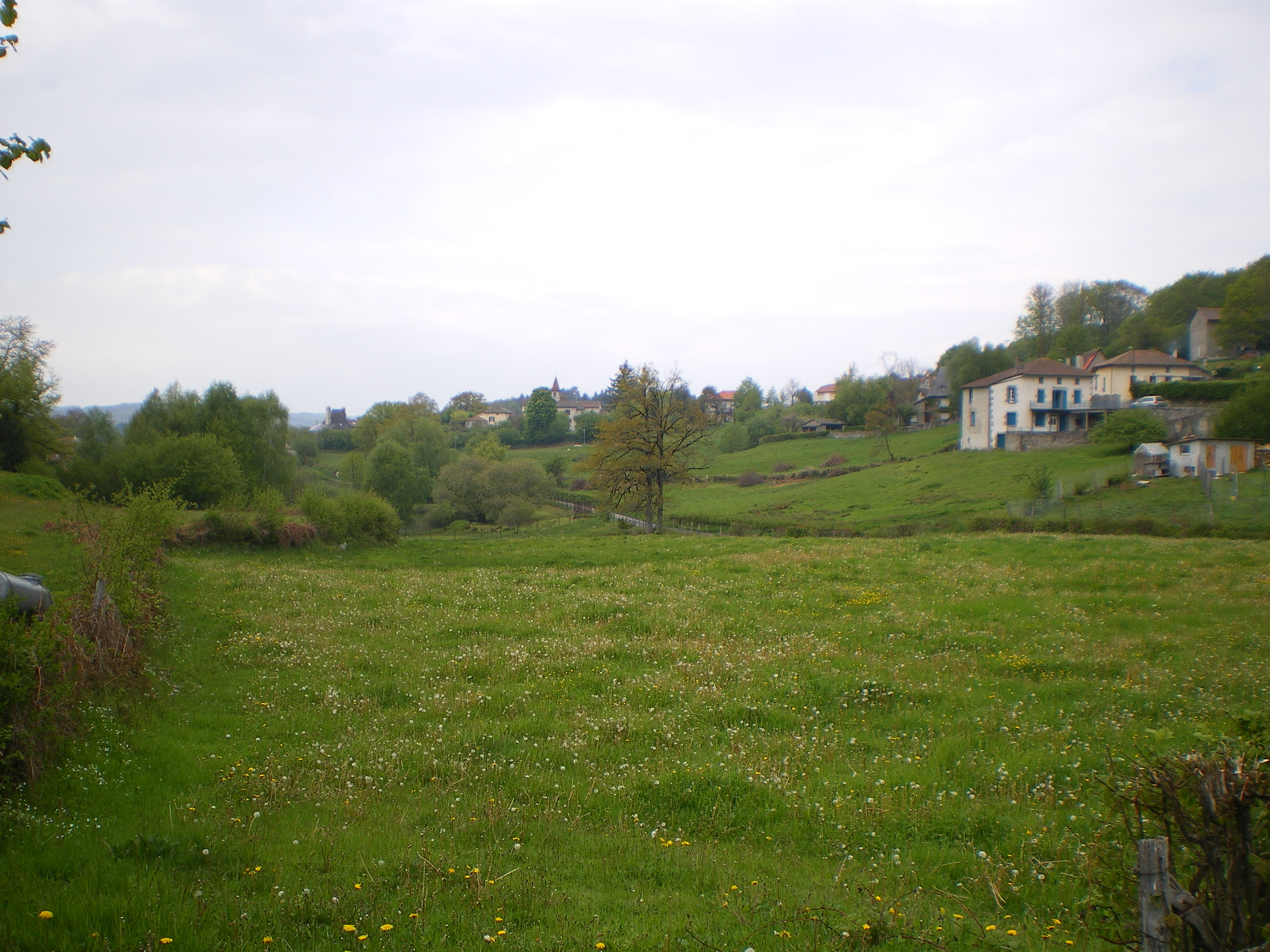
- A general view of La Ségalassière
- Location of La Ségalassière
- Location within France Location within Auvergne-Rhône-Alpes
- Coordinates: 44°53′38″N 2°12′33″E
- Country: France
- Region: Auvergne-Rhône-Alpes
- Department: Cantal
- Arrondissement: Aurillac
- Canton: Saint-Paul-des-Landes

Government
  - Mayor (2022–2026): David Brousse
- Area^{1}: 6.57 km^{2} (2.54 sq mi)
- Elevation: 600 m (2,000 ft)
- Highest elevation: 652 m (2,139 ft)
- Lowest elevation: 536 m (1,759 ft)
- Population (2023): 121
  - Density: 18.4/km^{2} (47.7/sq mi)
- Time zone: UTC+01:00 (CET)
  - Summer (DST): UTC+02:00 (CEST)
- INSEE/Postal code: 15224 /15290
- ^{1} French Land Register data, which excludes lakes, ponds, glaciers > 1 km^{2} (0.386 sq mi or 247 acres) and river estuaries.

La Ségalassière (French pronunciation: [la seɡalasjɛʁ]; Occitan: La Segalassièira) is a commune in the Cantal department in south-central France.

== Population ==
Historical population
Year	Pop.	±% p.a.
1968	144	—
1975	122	−2.34%
1982	105	−2.12%
1990	78	−3.65%
1999	98	+2.57%
2007	114	+1.91%
2012	121	+1.20%
2017	125	+0.65%
2023	121	−0.54%
Source: INSEE

== See also ==
- Communes of the Cantal department
