= Lacapelle-Viescamp =

Commune in Auvergne-Rhône-Alpes, France

- Commune
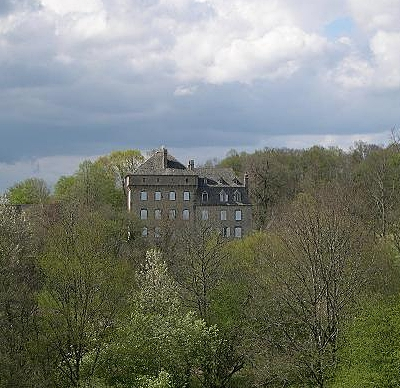
- The Château de Viescamp, in Lacapelle-Viescamp
- Location of Lacapelle-Viescamp
- Location within France Location within Auvergne-Rhône-Alpes
- Coordinates: 44°55′25″N 2°15′49″E
- Country: France
- Region: Auvergne-Rhône-Alpes
- Department: Cantal
- Arrondissement: Aurillac
- Canton: Saint-Paul-des-Landes
- Intercommunality: CA Aurillac Agglomération

Government
  - Mayor (2020–2026): Maryline Monteillet
- Area^{1}: 15.62 km^{2} (6.03 sq mi)
- Elevation: 552 m (1,811 ft)
- Highest elevation: 629 m (2,064 ft)
- Lowest elevation: 517 m (1,696 ft)
- Population (2023): 528
  - Density: 33.8/km^{2} (87.5/sq mi)
- Time zone: UTC+01:00 (CET)
  - Summer (DST): UTC+02:00 (CEST)
- INSEE/Postal code: 15088 /15150
- ^{1} French Land Register data, which excludes lakes, ponds, glaciers > 1 km^{2} (0.386 sq mi or 247 acres) and river estuaries.

Lacapelle-Viescamp (French pronunciation: [lakapɛl vjɛskɑ̃]) is a commune in the Cantal department in south-central France.

== Population ==
Historical population
Year	Pop.	±% p.a.
1968	351	—
1975	334	−0.71%
1982	388	+2.16%
1990	438	+1.53%
1999	434	−0.10%
2007	448	+0.40%
2012	501	+2.26%
2017	515	+0.55%
2023	528	+0.42%
Source: INSEE

== See also ==
- Communes of the Cantal department
