= Siran, Cantal =

Commune in Auvergne-Rhône-Alpes, France

Siran
- Commune
- Location of Siran
- Location within France Location within Auvergne-Rhône-Alpes
- Coordinates: 44°57′20″N 2°07′43″E
- Country: France
- Region: Auvergne-Rhône-Alpes
- Department: Cantal
- Arrondissement: Aurillac
- Canton: Saint-Paul-des-Landes
- Intercommunality: Châtaigneraie Cantalienne

Government
  - Mayor (2020–2026): Guy Mespoulhes
- Area^{1}: 50.88 km^{2} (19.64 sq mi)
- Elevation: 620 m (2,030 ft)
- Highest elevation: 699 m (2,293 ft)
- Lowest elevation: 347 m (1,138 ft)
- Population (2023): 467
  - Density: 9.18/km^{2} (23.8/sq mi)
- Time zone: UTC+01:00 (CET)
  - Summer (DST): UTC+02:00 (CEST)
- INSEE/Postal code: 15228 /15150
- ^{1} French Land Register data, which excludes lakes, ponds, glaciers > 1 km^{2} (0.386 sq mi or 247 acres) and river estuaries.

Siran (French pronunciation: [siʁɑ̃]) is a commune in the Cantal department in south-central France.

== Population ==
Historical population
Year	Pop.	±% p.a.
1968	721	—
1975	705	−0.32%
1982	650	−1.15%
1990	606	−0.87%
1999	529	−1.50%
2007	517	−0.29%
2012	500	−0.67%
2017	476	−0.98%
2023	467	−0.32%
Source: INSEE

== See also ==
- Communes of the Cantal department
