= Saint-Victor, Cantal =

Commune in Auvergne-Rhône-Alpes, France

Saint-Victor
- Commune
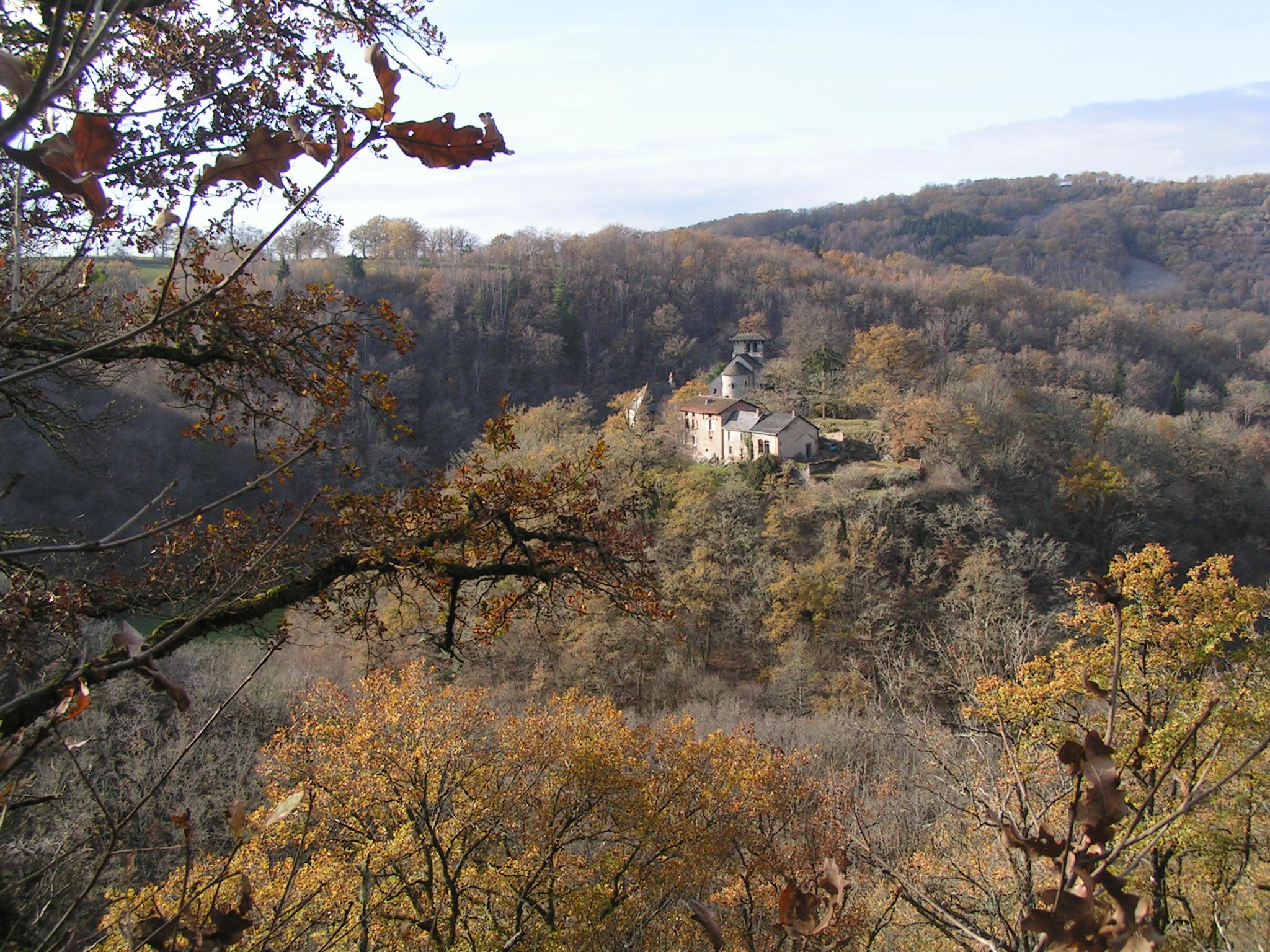
- A general view of Saint-Victor
- Location of Saint-Victor
- Location within France Location within Auvergne-Rhône-Alpes
- Coordinates: 45°00′39″N 2°17′19″E
- Country: France
- Region: Auvergne-Rhône-Alpes
- Department: Cantal
- Arrondissement: Aurillac
- Canton: Saint-Paul-des-Landes

Government
  - Mayor (2020–2026): Michel Teyssou
- Area^{1}: 13.53 km^{2} (5.22 sq mi)
- Elevation: 600 m (2,000 ft)
- Highest elevation: 652 m (2,139 ft)
- Lowest elevation: 440 m (1,440 ft)
- Population (2023): 91
  - Density: 6.7/km^{2} (17/sq mi)
- Time zone: UTC+01:00 (CET)
  - Summer (DST): UTC+02:00 (CEST)
- INSEE/Postal code: 15217 /15150
- ^{1} French Land Register data, which excludes lakes, ponds, glaciers > 1 km^{2} (0.386 sq mi or 247 acres) and river estuaries.

Saint-Victor (French pronunciation: [sɛ̃ viktɔʁ]; Auvergnat: Sant Victor) is a commune in the Cantal department in south-central France.

== Population ==
Historical population
Year	Pop.	±% p.a.
1968	152	—
1975	120	−3.32%
1982	141	+2.33%
1990	135	−0.54%
1999	127	−0.68%
2007	108	−2.01%
2012	112	+0.73%
2017	107	−0.91%
2023	91	−2.66%
Source: INSEE

== See also ==
- Communes of the Cantal department
