= Saint-Santin-Cantalès =

Commune in Auvergne-Rhône-Alpes, France

- Commune
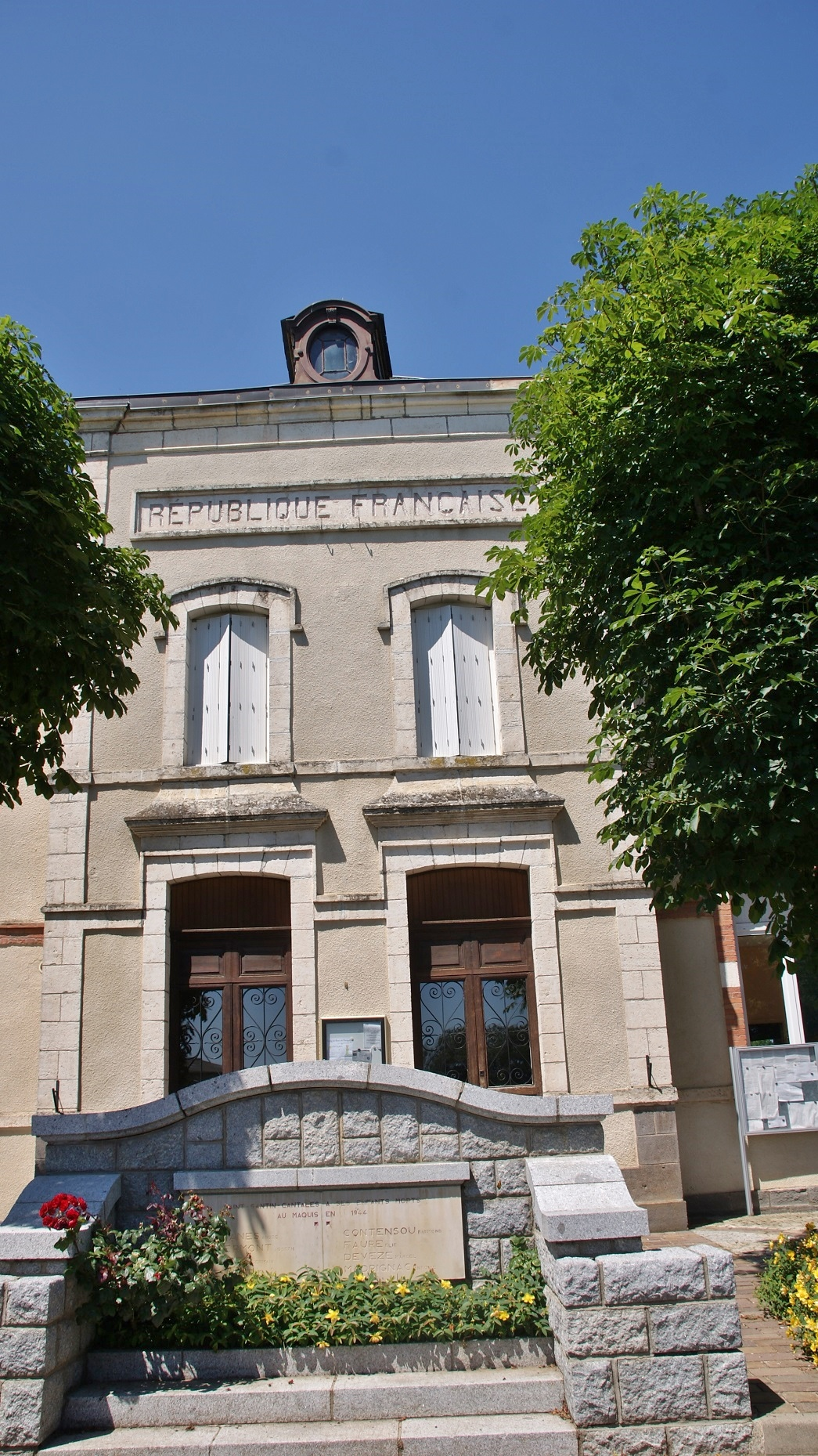
- Town hall
- Location of Saint-Santin-Cantalès
- Location within France Location within Auvergne-Rhône-Alpes
- Coordinates: 45°01′50″N 2°15′28″E
- Country: France
- Region: Auvergne-Rhône-Alpes
- Department: Cantal
- Arrondissement: Aurillac
- Canton: Saint-Paul-des-Landes

Government
  - Mayor (2020–2026): Alain Espalieu
- Area^{1}: 34.28 km^{2} (13.24 sq mi)
- Highest elevation: 707 m (2,320 ft)
- Lowest elevation: 428 m (1,404 ft)
- Population (2023): 279
  - Density: 8.14/km^{2} (21.1/sq mi)
- Time zone: UTC+01:00 (CET)
  - Summer (DST): UTC+02:00 (CEST)
- INSEE/Postal code: 15211 /15150
- ^{1} French Land Register data, which excludes lakes, ponds, glaciers > 1 km^{2} (0.386 sq mi or 247 acres) and river estuaries.

Saint-Santin-Cantalès (French pronunciation: [sɛ̃ sɑ̃tɛ̃ kɑ̃talɛs]; Auvergnat: Sent Santin de Cantalés) is a commune in the Cantal department in south-central France.

== Population ==
Historical population
| Year | Pop. | ±% p.a. |
|---|---|---|
| 1968 | 486 | — |
| 1975 | 374 | −3.67% |
| 1982 | 344 | −1.19% |
| 1990 | 302 | −1.61% |
| 1999 | 316 | +0.50% |
| 2007 | 330 | +0.54% |
| 2012 | 319 | −0.68% |
| 2017 | 307 | −0.76% |
| 2023 | 279 | −1.58% |
Source: INSEE

== See also ==
- Communes of the Cantal department
