= Nieudan =

Commune in Auvergne-Rhône-Alpes, France

- Commune
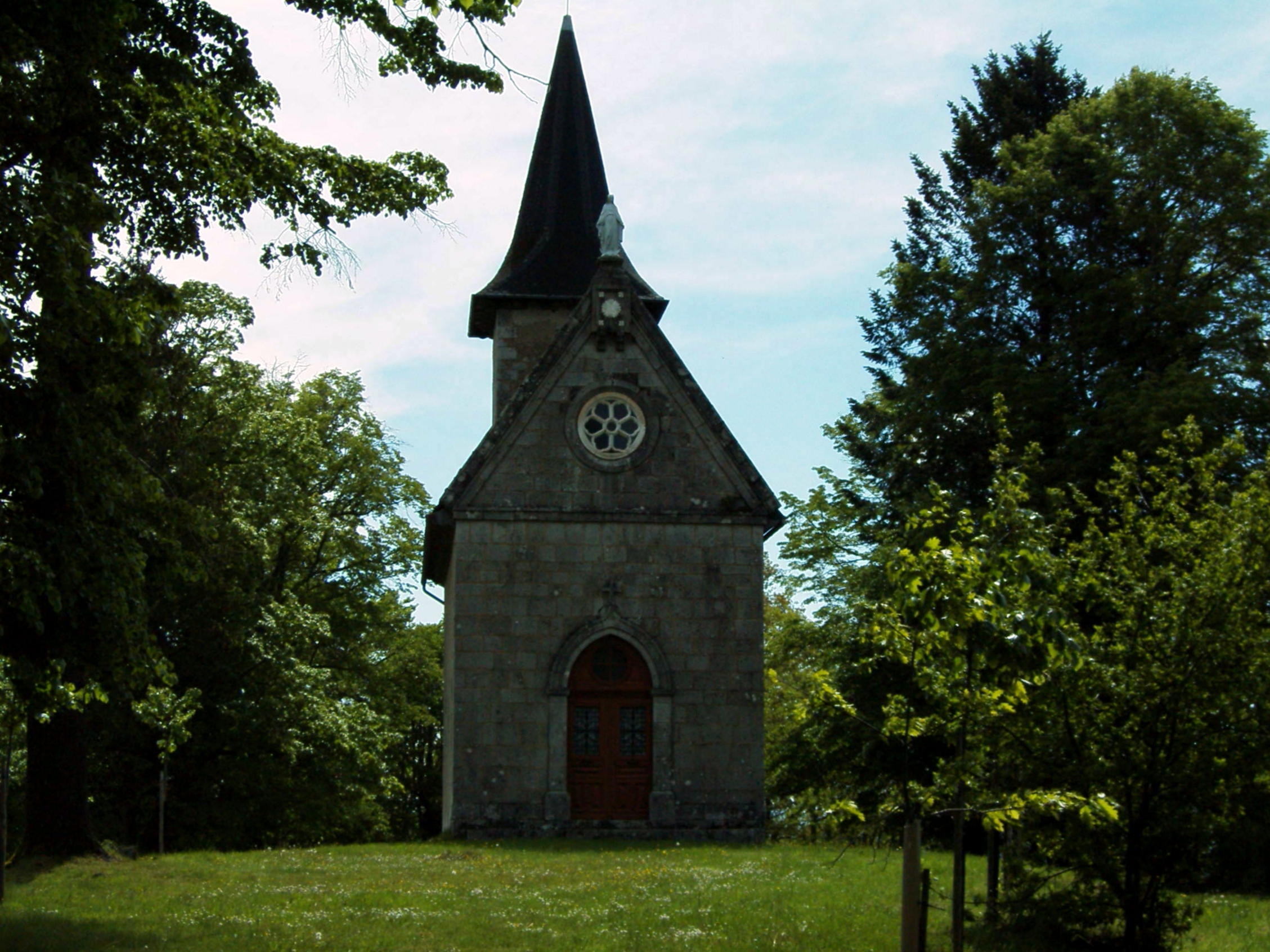
- Chapel of Puy Rachat
- Location of Nieudan
- Location within France Location within Auvergne-Rhône-Alpes
- Coordinates: 44°59′05″N 2°14′38″E
- Country: France
- Region: Auvergne-Rhône-Alpes
- Department: Cantal
- Arrondissement: Aurillac
- Canton: Saint-Paul-des-Landes

Government
  - Mayor (2020–2026): Gérard Troupel
- Area^{1}: 12.4 km^{2} (4.8 sq mi)
- Elevation: 496 m (1,627 ft)
- Highest elevation: 626 m (2,054 ft)
- Lowest elevation: 479 m (1,572 ft)
- Population (2023): 109
  - Density: 8.79/km^{2} (22.8/sq mi)
- Time zone: UTC+01:00 (CET)
  - Summer (DST): UTC+02:00 (CEST)
- INSEE/Postal code: 15143 /15150
- ^{1} French Land Register data, which excludes lakes, ponds, glaciers > 1 km^{2} (0.386 sq mi or 247 acres) and river estuaries.

Nieudan (French pronunciation: [njødɑ̃]; Occitan: Nuòudòm) is a commune in the département of Cantal in south-central France.

== Population ==
Historical population
Year	Pop.	±% p.a.
1968	115	—
1975	105	−1.29%
1982	99	−0.84%
1990	97	−0.25%
1999	105	+0.88%
2007	106	+0.12%
2012	109	+0.56%
2017	106	−0.56%
2023	109	+0.47%
Source: INSEE

== See also ==
- Communes of the Cantal department
