= Gabrielle Petit (feminist) =

French feminist activist, anticlerical, libertarian socialist, editor (1860–1952)

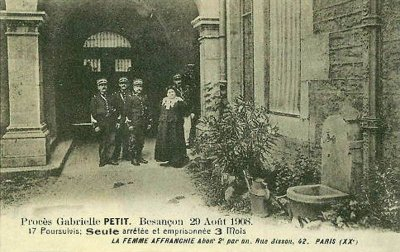
Gabrielle Petit (1908)

Gabrielle Petit, née Mathieu (French: [ɡabʁijɛl pəti]; ; November 26, 1860 – 1952), was a French feminist activist, anticlerical, libertarian socialist, and newspaper editor. Independent of any political party, she collaborated with trade unionists and Freethought activists. She founded the newspaper La Femme affranchie (The Emancipated Woman) where she denounced prostitution. At conferences, she spoke about the emancipation of women, birth control, the evils of militarism, and support for workers' strikes.

== Early life and education ==
Gabrielle Mathieu was born in Cayrols, November 26, 1860, into a family of millers in Cantal. She worked from the age of eight, helping her parents and looking after the goats.

At the age of 14, Petit experienced her first encounter with the law for throwing stones on the railway track, at a moving train; she and her friend were fined. She did not go to school and as she explained during her first trial:— "Until I was 20, I had no other teacher than nature, the fields, the meadows and the forest for my library, the book of life, the most complete and the newest because it has a new page every day."

== Career ==
She emigrated to the U.S. where she had a son before separating from the father. She did not return to France until the age of 32, where she raised her son alone. In 1897, when she was 37 years old, she became involved in defending and assisting women and children.

=== La Femme affranchie ===
After meeting Marguerite Durand, feminist activist and founder of the newspaper La Fronde, Petit became involved in journalism.

In April 1904, Petit founded La Femme affranchie, "an organ of socialist and free-thinking worker feminism". She ran the newspaper until 1913 and then during the 1930s.

She relied on the support of a former communard, Jean Allemane, deported to New Caledonia, who worked with her to solve the issue of financing the newspaper, which included subscriptions, street sales, and sales to unions and activists. From 1904 to 1907, the team was reinforced by numerous writers, including the pacifist and feminist Odette Laguerre and Nelly Roussel, who came from a bourgeois Catholic family, but who when 20 broke with family values to turn to the feminist struggle.

Among the many themes developed, La Femme affranchie devoted a number of articles to the denunciation of prostitution.

Le journal "La femme affranchie", dirigé de 1904 à 1913 par Gabrielle Petit, féministe, antimilitariste et anarchiste, dénonçait la police française et son droit d’interpeler sans mandat les prostituées. Le journal estimait à "dix mille" le nombre de prostituées ou prétendues telles, emprisonnées pour n’avoir "commis d’autres crimes que d’être pauvres".

The newspaper "La femme affranchie", edited from 1904 to 1913 by Gabrielle Petit, a feminist, anti-militarist and anarchist, denounced the French police and their right to arrest prostitutes without a warrant. The newspaper estimated at "ten thousand" the number of prostitutes or those claiming to be prostitutes, imprisoned for having "committed no other crime than being poor".

— Francis Dupuis-Déri, "Les anarchistes et la prostitution : perspectives historiques"

In addition to publishing the newspaper, Gabrielle held conferences throughout France on the exploitation of women, notably with the neomalthusianist Paul Robin. It was during one of the conferences that Petit met Julia Bertrand, who introduced her to libertarian ideology. From 1904 to 1910, Petit gave 2,000 lectures in 58 departments. She admitted she really admired Louise Michel, praising her when she died in 1905.

=== Antimilitarism trial ===
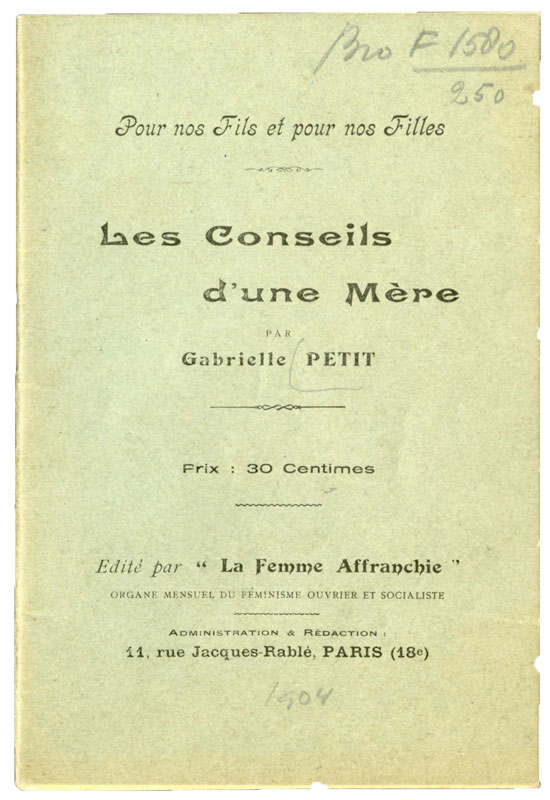
Les Conseils d'une Mère (1904)

On August 1, 1907, Petit was arrested in Granges, Vosges, and imprisoned. At her trial, on November 20, 1907, she was accused of having made antimilitarist remarks during a lecture and of having, in a train, incited soldiers to become disobedient and steal weapons. She remained in prison until February 1, 1908. Having become a "dangerous" person, she was accompanied in all her travels by a police commissioner or a gendarme. But that did not prevent Petit from continuing to travel around France to give lectures, sometimes three a day.

On August 2, 1908, Petit was again arrested while supporting striking silk workers of Besançon, on the grounds, once again, that she was carrying out antimilitarist propaganda. The trial took place on August 29. She was sentenced to three months in prison, and released on November 13, 1908.

At the beginning of 1913, Petit and Bertrand, sensing the rising threat of war, wrote a special issue of La Femme affranchie, while the voice of the nationalists became more and more vehement and violent against the pacifists.

=== Interwar period ===
In 1927, while she lived successively in the Vosges, Lot, and Charente departments, she was always flanked by a policeman, and she was registered in the Carnet B, from August 23, 1913.

She resumed her lectures on pacifism and women's right to vote, even if, as a libertarian sympathizer, she considered that this fight had its limits.

In the early 1930s, she participated in the libertarian community L’Intégrale in Puch-d'Agenais, Lot-et-Garonne, led by the "anarchizing socialist" Victor Coissac. Despite her advancing age, she was now 73, she was very active, especially at the printing press.

== Death ==
Gabrielle Petit died in 1952.

== Selected works ==
- Les Conseils d'une Mère, La Femme affranchie, 1904, (text)
- "La bonne belle-mere", in Les Cahiers Féministes, no. 4, 1904
- "Conte de mai", in Les Cahiers Féministes, no. 5, 1904
- "La femme de l'avenir", in Les Cahiers Féministes, no. 8, 1904

== Bibliography ==
- Gabrielle Petit, devant la Cour d'assises de Nancy, 21 novembre 1907, in Christine Bard, Grégoire Kauffmann, Les insoumises, la révolution féministe, Le Monde, 2013, ISBN 978-2-35184-131-0. (in French)
- Anne Cova, Féminismes et néo-malthusianismes sous la Troisième République, L'Harmattan, 2011, ISBN 978-2-296-54569-4, online excerpts. (in French)
- Christiane Demeulenaere-Douyère, Paul Robin. Un militant de la liberté et du bonheur, Paris, Publisud, 1994, p.320. (in French)
- Madeleine Laude, Gabrielle Petit, l'indomptable, Éditions du Monde libertaire, 2010, OCLC 758833296, editor's note . (in French)
- Florence Rochefort, Michelle Zancarini-Fournel, Le pouvoir du genre : laïcités et religions, 1905-2005, Éditions Presses Universitaires du Mirail, 2007, p.114, ISBN 2858169497. (in French)
- Patrick Schindler, Gabrielle Petit, l’indomptable : une femme affranchie, Le Monde libertaire, n°1628, 24 mars 2011, full text. (in French)
- Georges Ubbiali, Une femme affranchie. Gabrielle Petit, l’indomptable, revue électronique Dissidences, Bibliothèque de comptes rendus, septembre 2011, full text. (in French)
- Daniel Vasseur, Les débuts du mouvement ouvrier dans la région Belfort-Montbéliard (1870-1914), Annales littéraires de l'Université de Franche-Comté, 1967, p.137, ISBN 978-2-251-60083-3. (in French)
- Michelle Zancarini-Fournel, Florence Rochefort, Bibia Pavard, Les lois Veil. Les événements fondateurs:Contraception 1974, IVG 1975, Armand Colin, 2012, biographical sketch. (in French)
