= Cros-de-Montvert =

Commune in Auvergne-Rhône-Alpes, France

- Commune
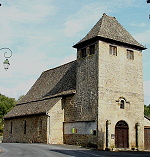
- Sainte-Madeleine Church
- Location of Cros-de-Montvert
- Location within France Location within Auvergne-Rhône-Alpes
- Coordinates: 45°03′17″N 2°08′54″E
- Country: France
- Region: Auvergne-Rhône-Alpes
- Department: Cantal
- Arrondissement: Aurillac
- Canton: Saint-Paul-des-Landes
- Intercommunality: Châtaigneraie Cantalienne

Government
  - Mayor (2020–2026): Arlette Gasquet
- Area^{1}: 29.28 km^{2} (11.31 sq mi)
- Elevation: 577 m (1,893 ft)
- Highest elevation: 703 m (2,306 ft)
- Lowest elevation: 304 m (997 ft)
- Population (2023): 197
  - Density: 6.73/km^{2} (17.4/sq mi)
- Time zone: UTC+01:00 (CET)
  - Summer (DST): UTC+02:00 (CEST)
- INSEE/Postal code: 15057 /15150
- ^{1} French Land Register data, which excludes lakes, ponds, glaciers > 1 km^{2} (0.386 sq mi or 247 acres) and river estuaries.

Cros-de-Montvert is a commune in the Cantal department in south-central France. The commune has one known church.

== Geography ==
The river Maronne forms the commune's northwestern border.

== Demography ==
Historical population
Year	Pop.	±% p.a.
1968	370	—
1975	305	−2.72%
1982	253	−2.63%
1990	261	+0.39%
1999	225	−1.64%
2007	221	−0.22%
2012	208	−1.21%
2017	194	−1.38%
2023	197	+0.26%
Source: INSEE

== See also ==
- Communes of the Cantal department
