= Montvert =

Commune in Auvergne-Rhône-Alpes, France

- Commune
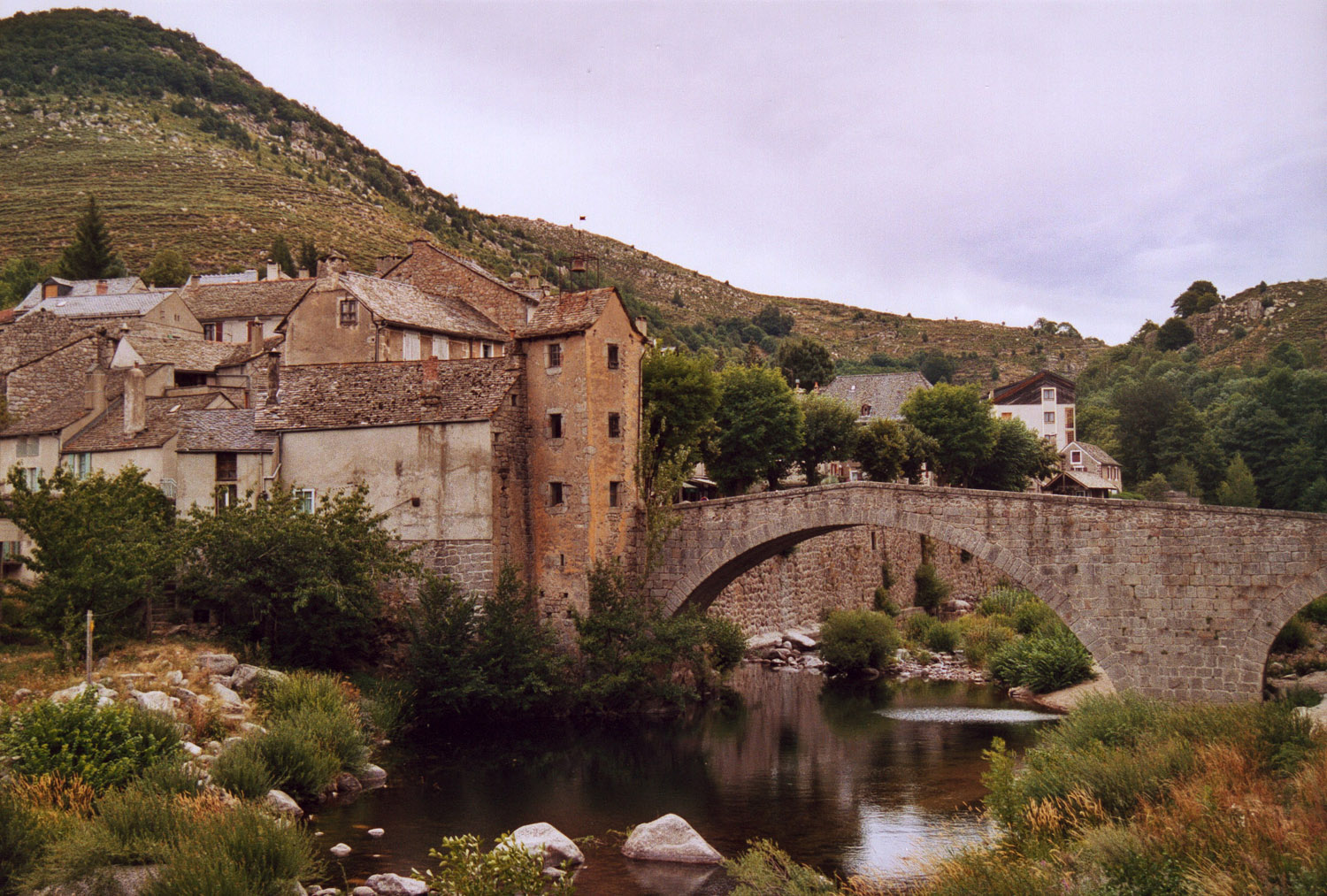
- The bridge in Montvert
- Location of Montvert
- Location within France Location within Auvergne-Rhône-Alpes
- Coordinates: 44°59′46″N 2°09′40″E
- Country: France
- Region: Auvergne-Rhône-Alpes
- Department: Cantal
- Arrondissement: Aurillac
- Canton: Saint-Paul-des-Landes

Government
  - Mayor (2020–2026): Alain Richard
- Area^{1}: 11.37 km^{2} (4.39 sq mi)
- Elevation: 630 m (2,070 ft)
- Highest elevation: 684 m (2,244 ft)
- Lowest elevation: 392 m (1,286 ft)
- Population (2023): 112
  - Density: 9.85/km^{2} (25.5/sq mi)
- Time zone: UTC+01:00 (CET)
  - Summer (DST): UTC+02:00 (CEST)
- INSEE/Postal code: 15135 /15150
- ^{1} French Land Register data, which excludes lakes, ponds, glaciers > 1 km^{2} (0.386 sq mi or 247 acres) and river estuaries.

Montvert (French pronunciation: [mɔ̃vɛʁ]; Occitan: Montverd) is a commune in the Cantal department in south-central France.

== Population ==
Historical population
Year	Pop.	±% p.a.
1968	198	—
1975	170	−2.15%
1982	133	−3.45%
1990	130	−0.28%
1999	115	−1.35%
2007	114	−0.11%
2012	114	+0.00%
2017	118	+0.69%
2023	112	−0.87%
Source: INSEE

== See also ==
- Communes of the Cantal department
