= Arnac =

Commune in Auvergne-Rhône-Alpes, France

- Commune
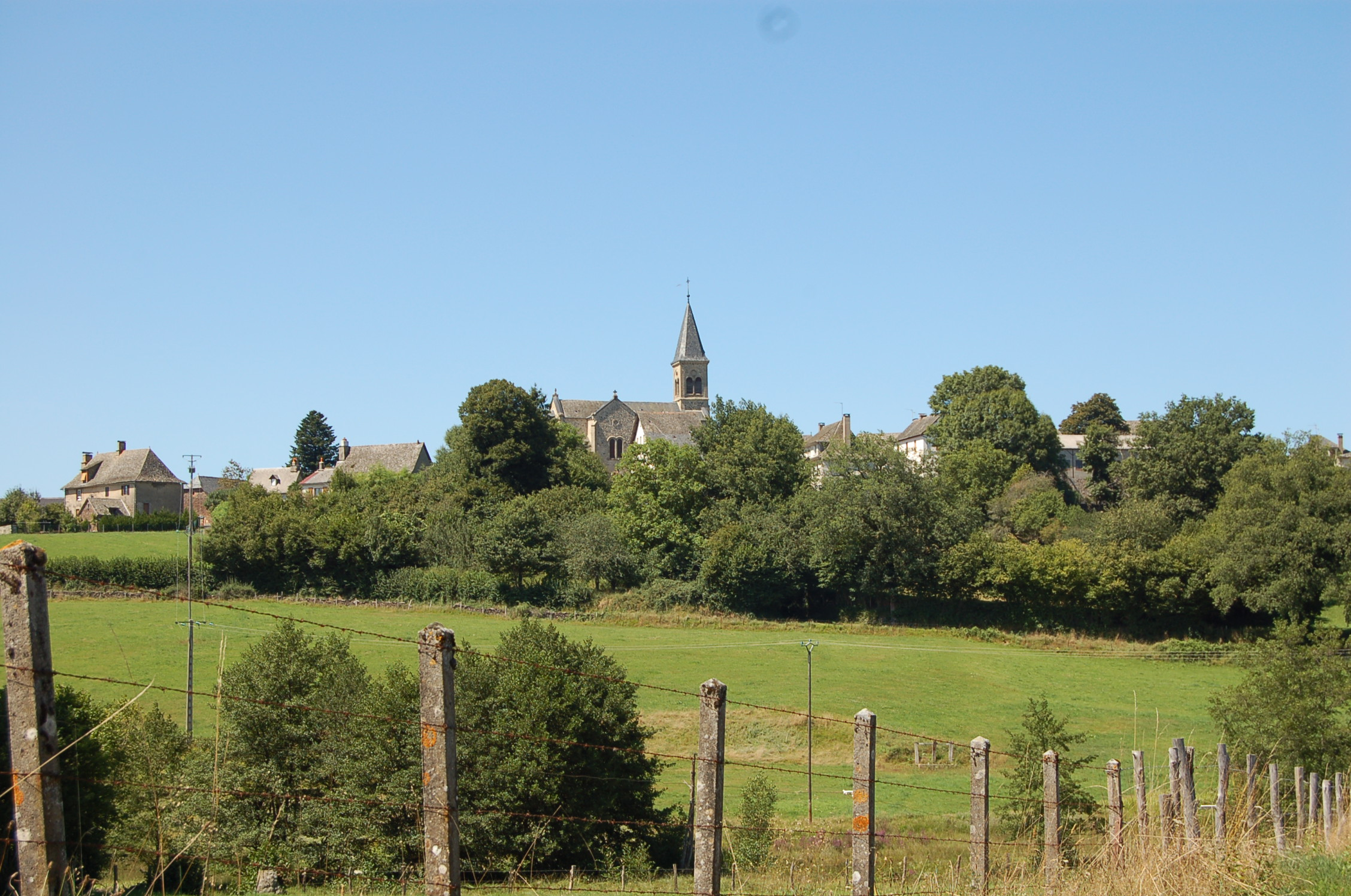
- A general view of Arnac, in 2008
- Location of Arnac
- Location within France Location within Auvergne-Rhône-Alpes
- Coordinates: 45°03′32″N 2°14′02″E
- Country: France
- Region: Auvergne-Rhône-Alpes
- Department: Cantal
- Arrondissement: Aurillac
- Canton: Saint-Paul-des-Landes
- Intercommunality: CC Châtaigneraie Cantalienne

Government
  - Mayor (2020–2026): Michel Cabanes
- Area^{1}: 20.15 km^{2} (7.78 sq mi)
- Elevation: 620 m (2,030 ft)
- Highest elevation: 671 m (2,201 ft)
- Lowest elevation: 360 m (1,180 ft)
- Population (2023): 174
  - Density: 8.64/km^{2} (22.4/sq mi)
- Time zone: UTC+01:00 (CET)
  - Summer (DST): UTC+02:00 (CEST)
- INSEE/Postal code: 15011 /15150
- ^{1} French Land Register data, which excludes lakes, ponds, glaciers > 1 km^{2} (0.386 sq mi or 247 acres) and river estuaries.

Arnac (French pronunciation: [aʁnak]; Occitan: Arnac) is a commune in the Cantal department in south-central France.

== Geography ==
The Maronne river and the Enchanet reservoir form the commune's northern border.

== Population ==
Historical population
Year	Pop.	±% p.a.
1968	305	—
1975	276	−1.42%
1982	209	−3.89%
1990	203	−0.36%
1999	173	−1.76%
2007	153	−1.52%
2012	156	+0.39%
2017	171	+1.85%
2023	174	+0.29%
Source: INSEE

== See also ==
- Communes of the Cantal department
