= Saint-Gérons =

Commune in Auvergne-Rhône-Alpes, France

- Commune
- Location of Saint-Gérons
- Location within France Location within Auvergne-Rhône-Alpes
- Coordinates: 44°57′05″N 2°13′02″E
- Country: France
- Region: Auvergne-Rhône-Alpes
- Department: Cantal
- Arrondissement: Aurillac
- Canton: Saint-Paul-des-Landes

Government
  - Mayor (2020–2026): Michel Canches
- Area^{1}: 16.68 km^{2} (6.44 sq mi)
- Elevation: 500 m (1,600 ft)
- Highest elevation: 699 m (2,293 ft)
- Lowest elevation: 435 m (1,427 ft)
- Population (2023): 220
  - Density: 13/km^{2} (34/sq mi)
- Time zone: UTC+01:00 (CET)
  - Summer (DST): UTC+02:00 (CEST)
- INSEE/Postal code: 15189 /15150
- ^{1} French Land Register data, which excludes lakes, ponds, glaciers > 1 km^{2} (0.386 sq mi or 247 acres) and river estuaries.

Saint-Gérons (Occitan: Sant-Gestionar) is a commune in the Cantal department in south-central France.

== Population ==
Historical population
Year	Pop.	±% p.a.
1968	278	—
1975	191	−5.22%
1982	178	−1.00%
1990	179	+0.07%
1999	177	−0.12%
2007	180	+0.21%
2012	217	+3.81%
2017	217	+0.00%
2023	220	+0.23%
Source: INSEE

== See also ==
- Communes of the Cantal department
