= Omps, Cantal =

Commune in Auvergne-Rhône-Alpes, France

Omps
- Commune
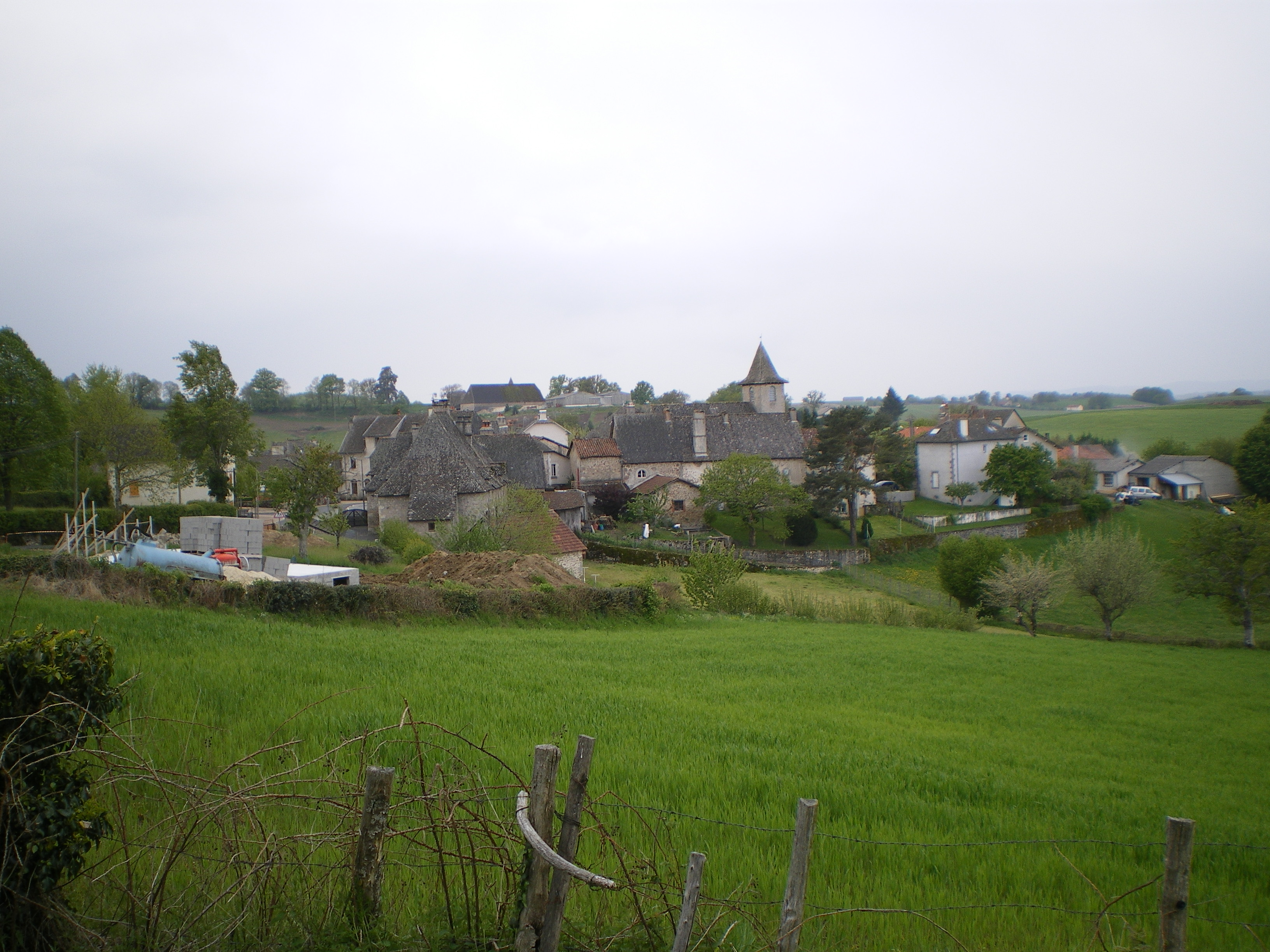
- A general view of Omps

- Coat of arms
- Location of Omps
- Location within France Location within Auvergne-Rhône-Alpes
- Coordinates: 44°52′44″N 2°16′37″E
- Country: France
- Region: Auvergne-Rhône-Alpes
- Department: Cantal
- Arrondissement: Aurillac
- Canton: Saint-Paul-des-Landes

Government
  - Mayor (2021–2026): Jean-Luc Loison
- Area^{1}: 12.62 km^{2} (4.87 sq mi)
- Elevation: 621 m (2,037 ft)
- Highest elevation: 723 m (2,372 ft)
- Lowest elevation: 517 m (1,696 ft)
- Population (2023): 314
  - Density: 24.9/km^{2} (64.4/sq mi)
- Time zone: UTC+01:00 (CET)
  - Summer (DST): UTC+02:00 (CEST)
- INSEE/Postal code: 15144 /15290
- ^{1} French Land Register data, which excludes lakes, ponds, glaciers > 1 km^{2} (0.386 sq mi or 247 acres) and river estuaries.

Omps is a commune in the Cantal department in south-central France.

It comprises a collection of pleasant cottages, many with lauze roofs, surrounding the village church, but there is also an imposing Manor House. It has recently undergone improvements to the public spaces. The village's only bar closed in 2006, and with the exception of a garden centre there are no other commercial premises.

== Population ==
Historical population
Year	Pop.	±% p.a.
1968	275	—
1975	248	−1.47%
1982	246	−0.12%
1990	223	−1.22%
1999	275	+2.36%
2007	299	+1.05%
2012	331	+2.05%
2017	342	+0.66%
2023	314	−1.41%
Source: INSEE

== See also ==
- Communes of the Cantal department
