= Teissières-de-Cornet =

Commune in Auvergne-Rhône-Alpes, France

- Commune
- Location of Teissières-de-Cornet
- Location within France Location within Auvergne-Rhône-Alpes
- Coordinates: 44°58′16″N 2°21′22″E
- Country: France
- Region: Auvergne-Rhône-Alpes
- Department: Cantal
- Arrondissement: Aurillac
- Canton: Naucelles
- Intercommunality: CA Aurillac Agglomération

Government
  - Mayor (2020–2026): Thierry Crueghe
- Area^{1}: 9.32 km^{2} (3.60 sq mi)
- Elevation: 630 m (2,070 ft)
- Highest elevation: 754 m (2,474 ft)
- Lowest elevation: 577 m (1,893 ft)
- Population (2023): 319
  - Density: 34.2/km^{2} (88.6/sq mi)
- Time zone: UTC+01:00 (CET)
  - Summer (DST): UTC+02:00 (CEST)
- INSEE/Postal code: 15233 /15250
- ^{1} French Land Register data, which excludes lakes, ponds, glaciers > 1 km^{2} (0.386 sq mi or 247 acres) and river estuaries.

Teissières-de-Cornet (French pronunciation: [tesjɛʁ də kɔʁnɛ]; Occitan: Teissièras de Cornet) is a commune in the Cantal department in south-central France.

== Population ==
Historical population
Year	Pop.	±% p.a.
1968	190	—
1975	199	+0.66%
1982	194	−0.36%
1990	189	−0.33%
1999	174	−0.91%
2007	194	+1.37%
2012	247	+4.95%
2017	293	+3.47%
2023	319	+1.43%
Source: INSEE

== See also ==
- Communes of the Cantal department
