= Boisset, Cantal =

Commune in Auvergne-Rhône-Alpes, France

Boisset
- Commune
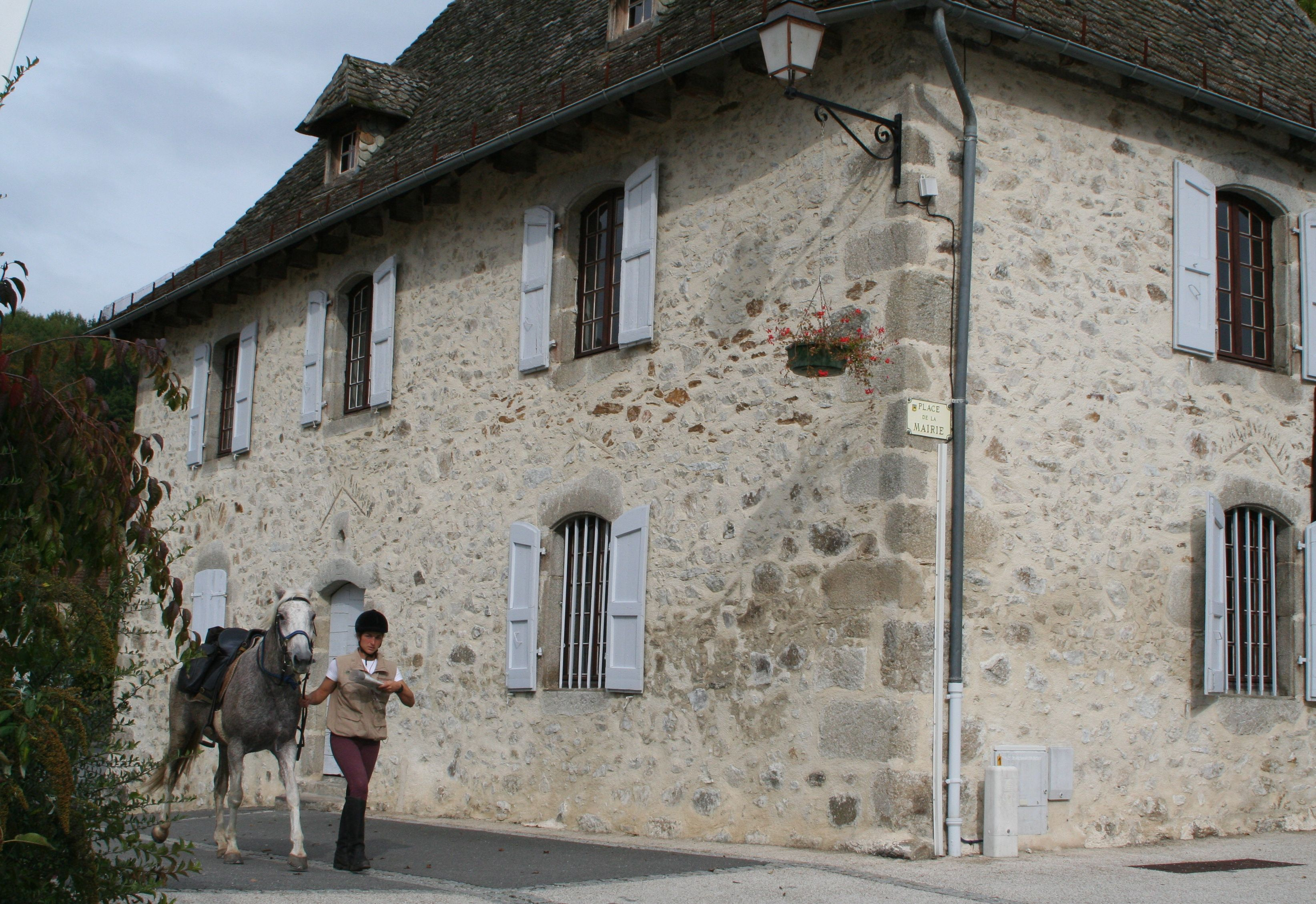
- A view in Boisset
- Location of Boisset
- Location within France Location within Auvergne-Rhône-Alpes
- Coordinates: 44°47′00″N 2°15′16″E
- Country: France
- Region: Auvergne-Rhône-Alpes
- Department: Cantal
- Arrondissement: Aurillac
- Canton: Maurs
- Intercommunality: Châtaigneraie Cantalienne

Government
  - Mayor (2020–2026): Dominique Beaudrey
- Area^{1}: 37.73 km^{2} (14.57 sq mi)
- Elevation: 426 m (1,398 ft)
- Highest elevation: 688 m (2,257 ft)
- Lowest elevation: 277 m (909 ft)
- Population (2023): 665
  - Density: 17.6/km^{2} (45.6/sq mi)
- Time zone: UTC+01:00 (CET)
  - Summer (DST): UTC+02:00 (CEST)
- INSEE/Postal code: 15021 /15600
- ^{1} French Land Register data, which excludes lakes, ponds, glaciers > 1 km^{2} (0.386 sq mi or 247 acres) and river estuaries.

Boisset (French pronunciation: [bwasɛ]) is a commune in the Cantal department in south-central France.

== Population ==
Historical population
Year	Pop.	±% p.a.
1968	896	—
1975	802	−1.57%
1982	756	−0.84%
1990	653	−1.81%
1999	653	+0.00%
2007	619	−0.67%
2012	604	−0.49%
2017	630	+0.85%
2023	665	+0.91%
Source: INSEE

== See also ==
- Communes of the Cantal department
