= Glénat, Cantal =

Commune in Auvergne-Rhône-Alpes, France

Glénat
- Commune
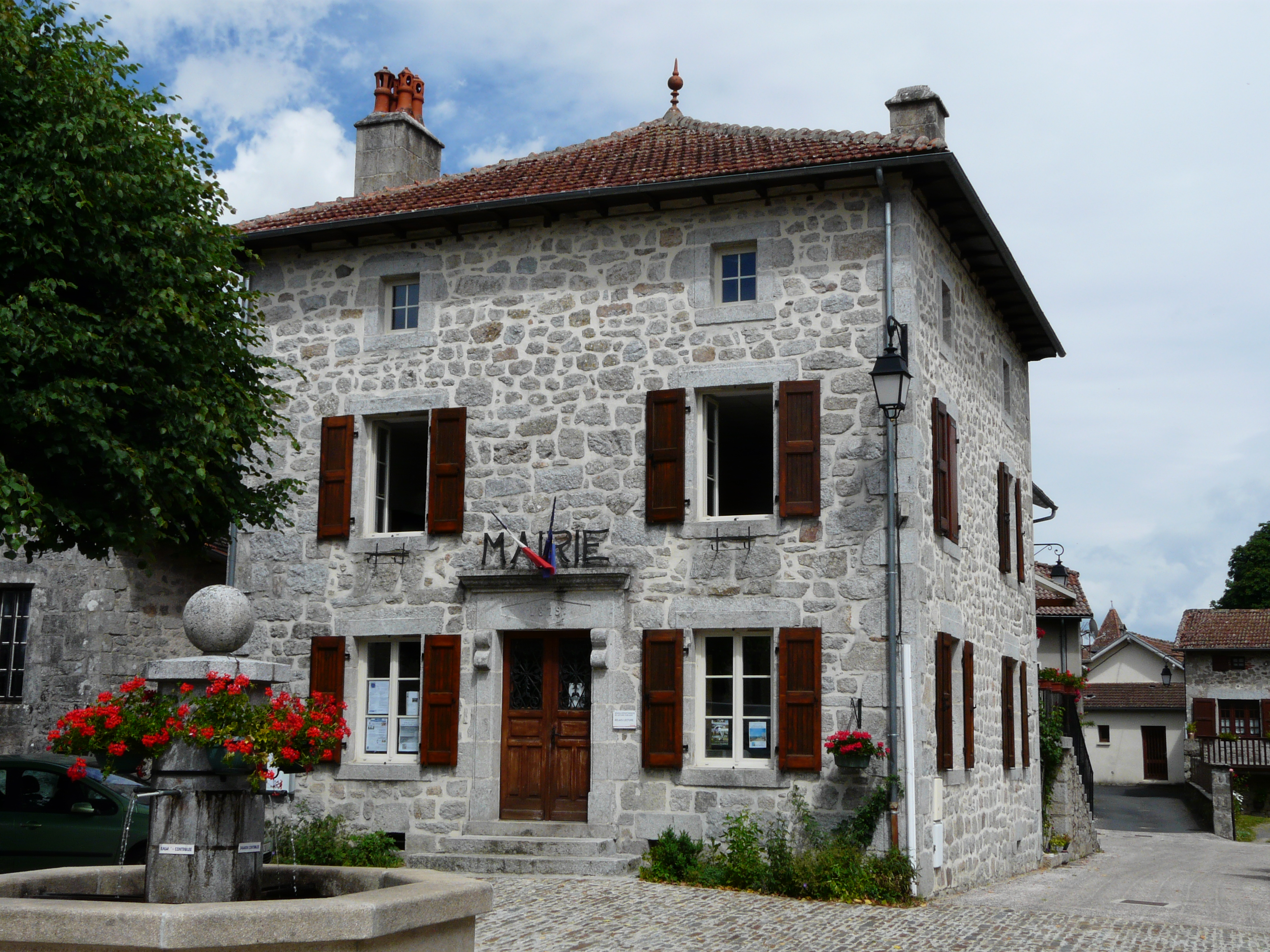
- Town hall

- Coat of arms
- Location of Glénat
- Location within France Location within Auvergne-Rhône-Alpes
- Coordinates: 44°54′07″N 2°10′54″E
- Country: France
- Region: Auvergne-Rhône-Alpes
- Department: Cantal
- Arrondissement: Aurillac
- Canton: Saint-Paul-des-Landes

Government
  - Mayor (2020–2026): Claude Prat
- Area^{1}: 24.27 km^{2} (9.37 sq mi)
- Elevation: 570 m (1,870 ft)
- Highest elevation: 747 m (2,451 ft)
- Lowest elevation: 534 m (1,752 ft)
- Population (2023): 178
  - Density: 7.33/km^{2} (19.0/sq mi)
- Time zone: UTC+01:00 (CET)
  - Summer (DST): UTC+02:00 (CEST)
- INSEE/Postal code: 15076 /15150
- ^{1} French Land Register data, which excludes lakes, ponds, glaciers > 1 km^{2} (0.386 sq mi or 247 acres) and river estuaries.

Glénat (French pronunciation: [ɡlena]) is a commune in the département of Cantal in south-central France.

== Population ==
Historical population
Year	Pop.	±% p.a.
1968	371	—
1975	298	−3.08%
1982	302	+0.19%
1990	271	−1.34%
1999	223	−2.14%
2007	217	−0.34%
2012	195	−2.12%
2017	174	−2.25%
2023	178	+0.38%
Source: INSEE

== See also ==
- Communes of the Cantal department
