= Rouffiac, Cantal =

Commune in Auvergne-Rhône-Alpes, France

Rouffiac
- Commune
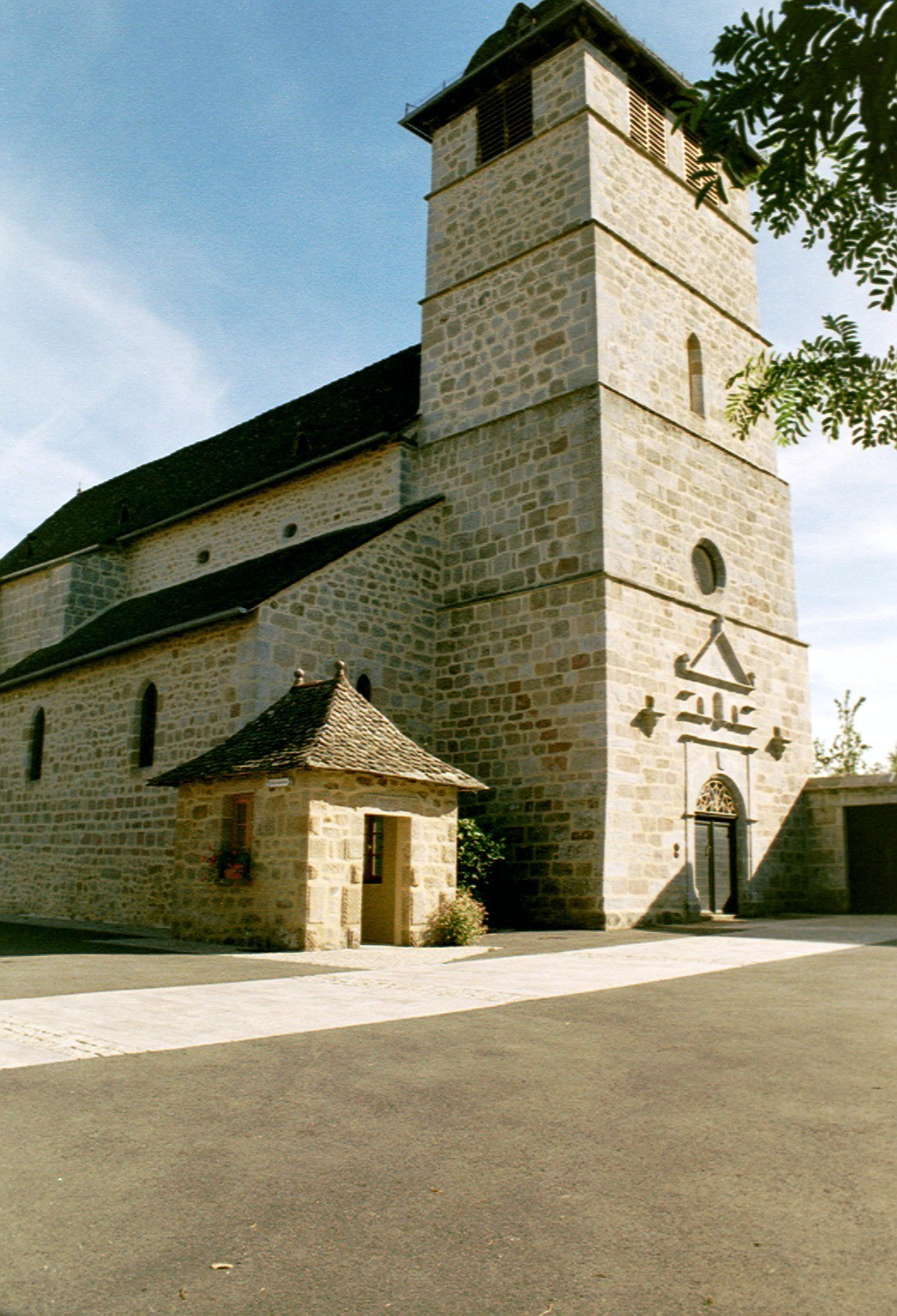
- The church in Rouffiac
- Location of Rouffiac
- Location within France Location within Auvergne-Rhône-Alpes
- Coordinates: 45°01′25″N 2°08′17″E
- Country: France
- Region: Auvergne-Rhône-Alpes
- Department: Cantal
- Arrondissement: Aurillac
- Canton: Saint-Paul-des-Landes

Government
  - Mayor (2020–2026): Alain Sériès
- Area^{1}: 23.12 km^{2} (8.93 sq mi)
- Elevation: 580 m (1,900 ft)
- Highest elevation: 685 m (2,247 ft)
- Lowest elevation: 280 m (920 ft)
- Population (2023): 181
  - Density: 7.83/km^{2} (20.3/sq mi)
- Time zone: UTC+01:00 (CET)
  - Summer (DST): UTC+02:00 (CEST)
- INSEE/Postal code: 15165 /15150
- ^{1} French Land Register data, which excludes lakes, ponds, glaciers > 1 km^{2} (0.386 sq mi or 247 acres) and river estuaries.

Rouffiac (French pronunciation: [ʁufjak]; Occitan: Rofiac) is a commune in the Cantal department in south-central France.

== Geography ==
The Maronne river forms part of the commune's northwestern border.

== Population ==
Historical population
Year	Pop.	±% p.a.
1968	446	—
1975	343	−3.68%
1982	314	−1.25%
1990	260	−2.33%
1999	237	−1.02%
2007	225	−0.65%
2012	213	−1.09%
2017	205	−0.76%
2023	181	−2.05%
Source: INSEE

== See also ==
- Communes of the Cantal department
