= Cayrols =

Commune in Auvergne-Rhône-Alpes, France

- Commune
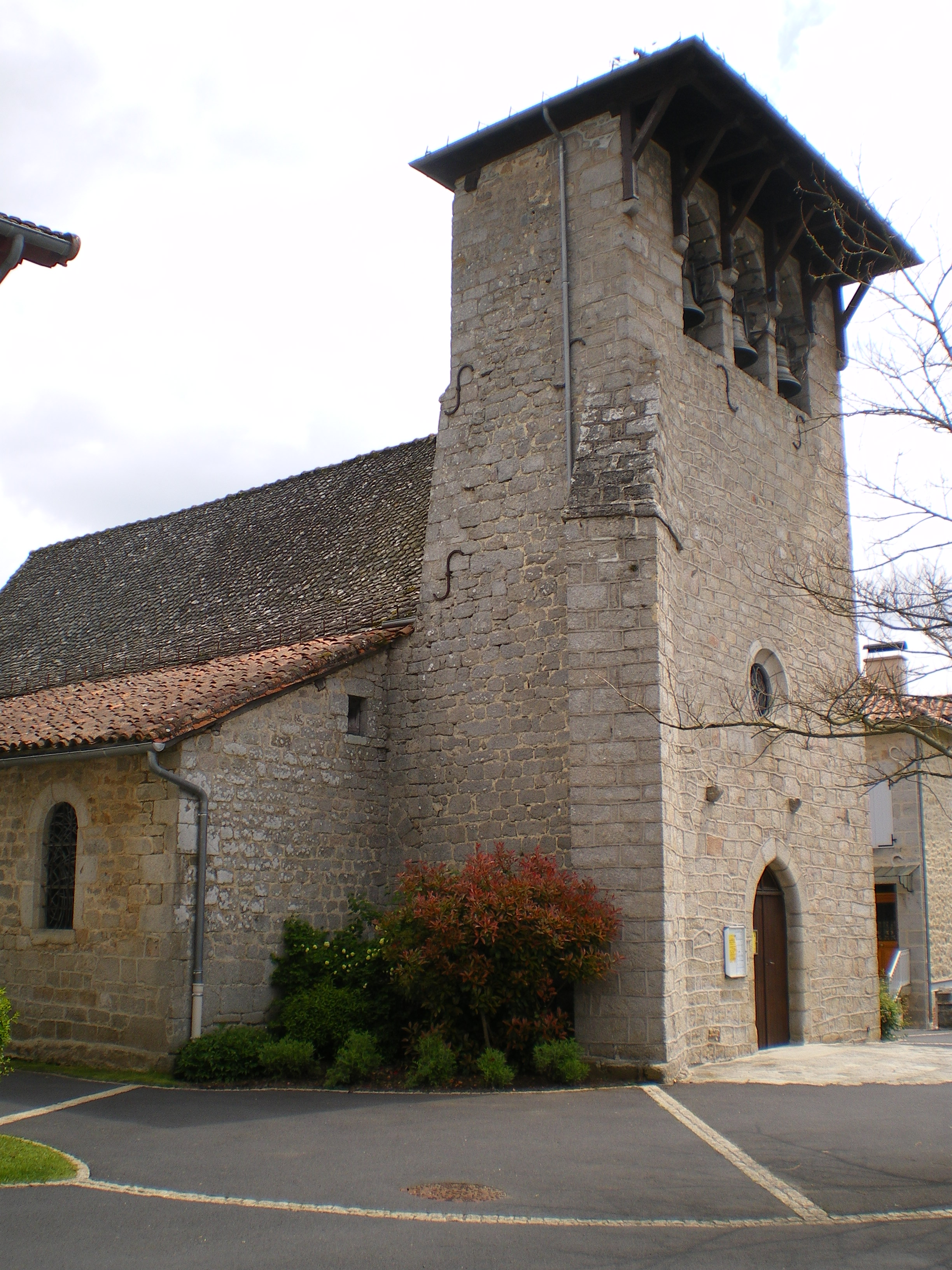
- The church in Cayrols

- Coat of arms
- Location of Cayrols
- Location within France Location within Auvergne-Rhône-Alpes
- Coordinates: 44°49′57″N 2°14′01″E
- Country: France
- Region: Auvergne-Rhône-Alpes
- Department: Cantal
- Arrondissement: Aurillac
- Canton: Saint-Paul-des-Landes

Government
  - Mayor (2020–2026): Lionel Cesano
- Area^{1}: 9.22 km^{2} (3.56 sq mi)
- Elevation: 582 m (1,909 ft)
- Highest elevation: 664 m (2,178 ft)
- Lowest elevation: 476 m (1,562 ft)
- Population (2023): 297
  - Density: 32.2/km^{2} (83.4/sq mi)
- Time zone: UTC+01:00 (CET)
  - Summer (DST): UTC+02:00 (CEST)
- INSEE/Postal code: 15030 /15290
- ^{1} French Land Register data, which excludes lakes, ponds, glaciers > 1 km^{2} (0.386 sq mi or 247 acres) and river estuaries.

Cayrols is a commune in the Cantal department in south-central France.

== Population ==
Historical population
Year	Pop.	±% p.a.
1968	296	—
1975	250	−2.38%
1982	229	−1.25%
1990	226	−0.16%
1999	227	+0.05%
2007	238	+0.59%
2012	285	+3.67%
2017	294	+0.62%
2023	297	+0.17%
Source: INSEE

== Notable people ==
- Gabrielle Petit (feminist) (1860–1952), feminist activist, anticlerical, libertarian socialist, newspaper editor

== See also ==
- Communes of the Cantal department
