= Sénezergues =

Commune in Auvergne-Rhône-Alpes, France

- Commune
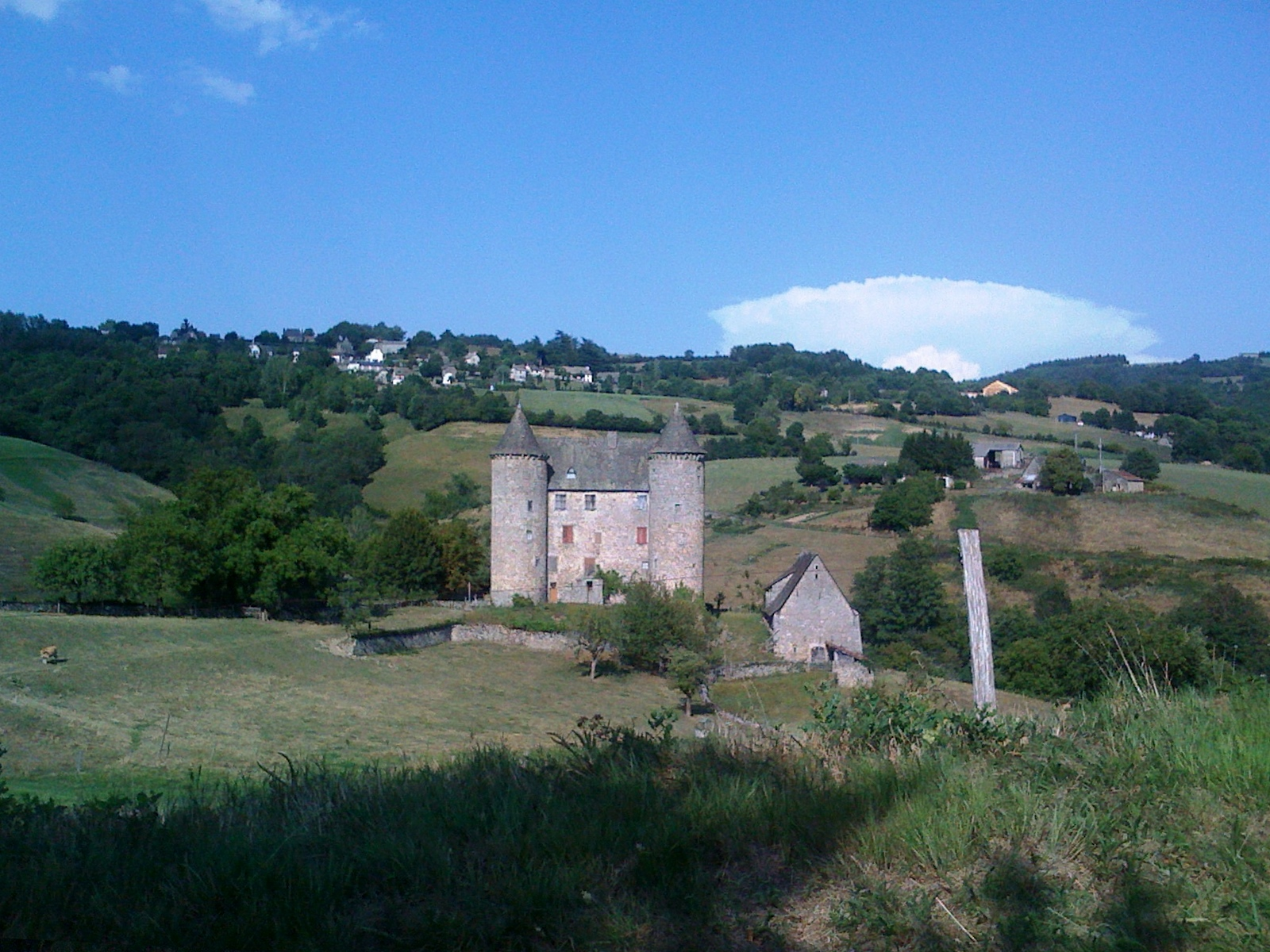
- The Château of Sénezergues
- Location of Sénezergues
- Location within France Location within Auvergne-Rhône-Alpes
- Coordinates: 44°42′12″N 2°24′50″E
- Country: France
- Region: Auvergne-Rhône-Alpes
- Department: Cantal
- Arrondissement: Aurillac
- Canton: Arpajon-sur-Cère

Government
  - Mayor (2020–2026): Léon Perier
- Area^{1}: 17.61 km^{2} (6.80 sq mi)
- Elevation: 480 m (1,570 ft)
- Highest elevation: 795 m (2,608 ft)
- Lowest elevation: 278 m (912 ft)
- Population (2023): 212
  - Density: 12.0/km^{2} (31.2/sq mi)
- Time zone: UTC+01:00 (CET)
  - Summer (DST): UTC+02:00 (CEST)
- INSEE/Postal code: 15226 /15340
- ^{1} French Land Register data, which excludes lakes, ponds, glaciers > 1 km^{2} (0.386 sq mi or 247 acres) and river estuaries.

Sénezergues (French pronunciation: [senzɛʁɡ]; Occitan: Senesergue) is a commune in the Cantal department in south-central France.

== Population ==
Historical population
Year	Pop.	±% p.a.
1968	310	—
1975	305	−0.23%
1982	278	−1.32%
1990	270	−0.36%
1999	230	−1.77%
2007	193	−2.17%
2012	196	+0.31%
2017	194	−0.20%
2023	212	+1.49%
Source: INSEE

== See also ==
- Communes of the Cantal department
