= Saint-Paul-des-Landes =

Commune in Auvergne-Rhône-Alpes, France

- Commune
- Location of Saint-Paul-des-Landes
- Location within France Location within Auvergne-Rhône-Alpes
- Coordinates: 44°56′40″N 2°18′55″E
- Country: France
- Region: Auvergne-Rhône-Alpes
- Department: Cantal
- Arrondissement: Aurillac
- Canton: Saint-Paul-des-Landes
- Intercommunality: CA Aurillac Agglomération

Government
  - Mayor (2020–2026): Patricia Benito
- Area^{1}: 19 km^{2} (7.3 sq mi)
- Elevation: 554 m (1,818 ft)
- Highest elevation: 664 m (2,178 ft)
- Lowest elevation: 536 m (1,759 ft)
- Population (2023): 1,542
  - Density: 81/km^{2} (210/sq mi)
- Time zone: UTC+01:00 (CET)
  - Summer (DST): UTC+02:00 (CEST)
- INSEE/Postal code: 15204 /15250
- ^{1} French Land Register data, which excludes lakes, ponds, glaciers > 1 km^{2} (0.386 sq mi or 247 acres) and river estuaries.

Saint-Paul-des-Landes (French pronunciation: [sɛ̃ pɔl de lɑ̃d]; Occitan: Sant Pau de las Landas) is a commune in the Cantal department in south-central France.

== Population ==
Historical population
Year	Pop.	±% p.a.
1968	615	—
1975	789	+3.62%
1982	1,003	+3.49%
1990	1,105	+1.22%
1999	1,100	−0.05%
2007	1,366	+2.74%
2012	1,510	+2.02%
2017	1,534	+0.32%
2023	1,542	+0.09%
Source: INSEE

== See also ==
- Communes of the Cantal department
