= Parlan =

Commune in Auvergne-Rhône-Alpes, France

- Commune
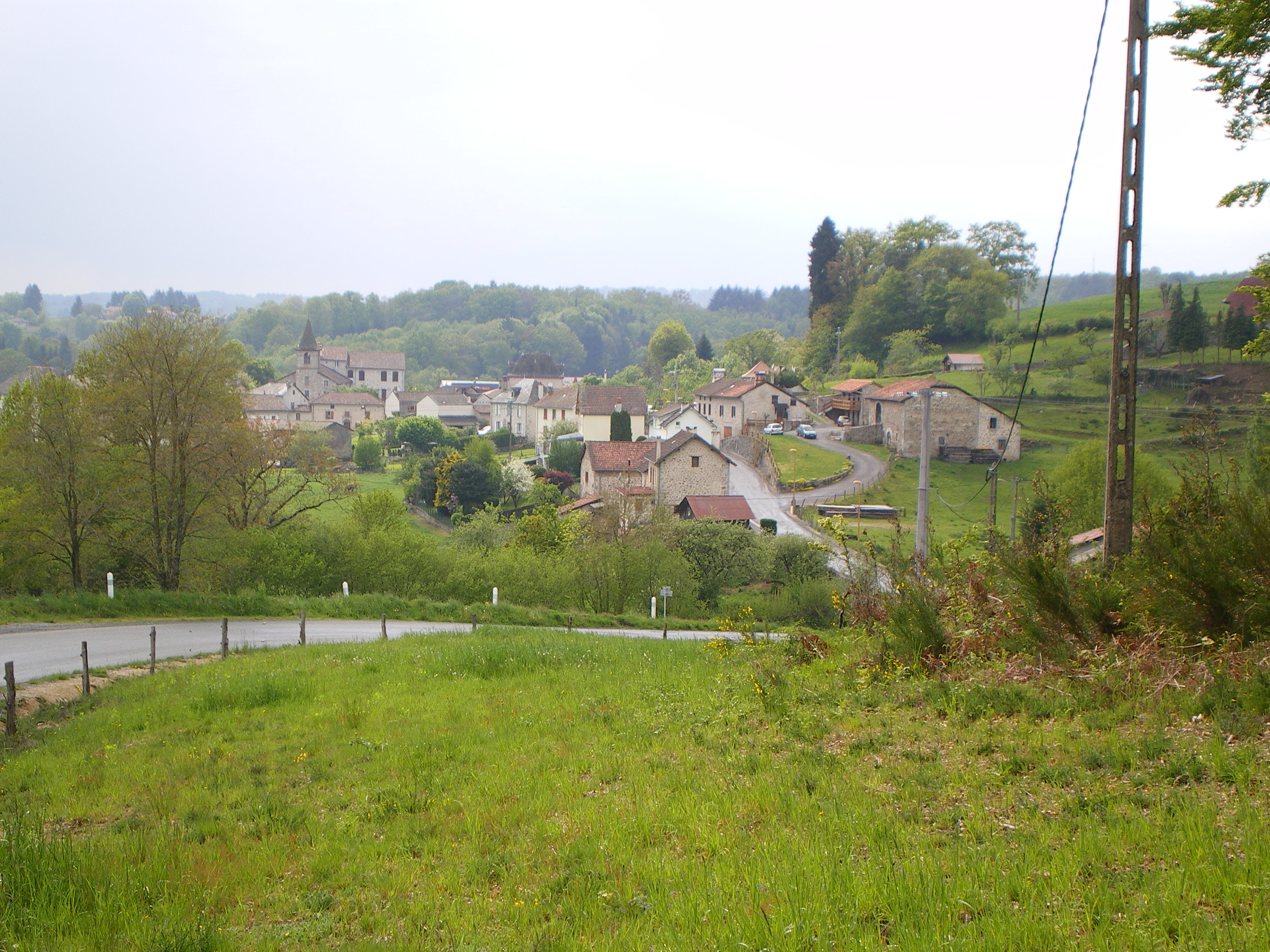
- A general view of Parlan
- Location of Parlan
- Location within France Location within Auvergne-Rhône-Alpes
- Coordinates: 44°49′48″N 2°10′24″E
- Country: France
- Region: Auvergne-Rhône-Alpes
- Department: Cantal
- Arrondissement: Aurillac
- Canton: Saint-Paul-des-Landes

Government
  - Mayor (2020–2026): Michel Teyssedou
- Area^{1}: 24.12 km^{2} (9.31 sq mi)
- Elevation: 493 m (1,617 ft)
- Highest elevation: 743 m (2,438 ft)
- Lowest elevation: 510 m (1,670 ft)
- Population (2023): 475
  - Density: 19.7/km^{2} (51.0/sq mi)
- Time zone: UTC+01:00 (CET)
  - Summer (DST): UTC+02:00 (CEST)
- INSEE/Postal code: 15147 /15290
- ^{1} French Land Register data, which excludes lakes, ponds, glaciers > 1 km^{2} (0.386 sq mi or 247 acres) and river estuaries.

Parlan (French pronunciation: [paʁlɑ̃]) is a commune in the Cantal department in south-central France.

== Population ==
Historical population
Year	Pop.	±% p.a.
1968	442	—
1975	409	−1.10%
1982	360	−1.81%
1990	323	−1.35%
1999	280	−1.57%
2007	297	+0.74%
2012	351	+3.40%
2017	437	+4.48%
2023	475	+1.40%
Source: INSEE

== See also ==
- Communes of the Cantal department
