= Arrondissement of Aurillac =

Coordinates: 44°55′N 2°26′E

Aurillac
- Arrondissement
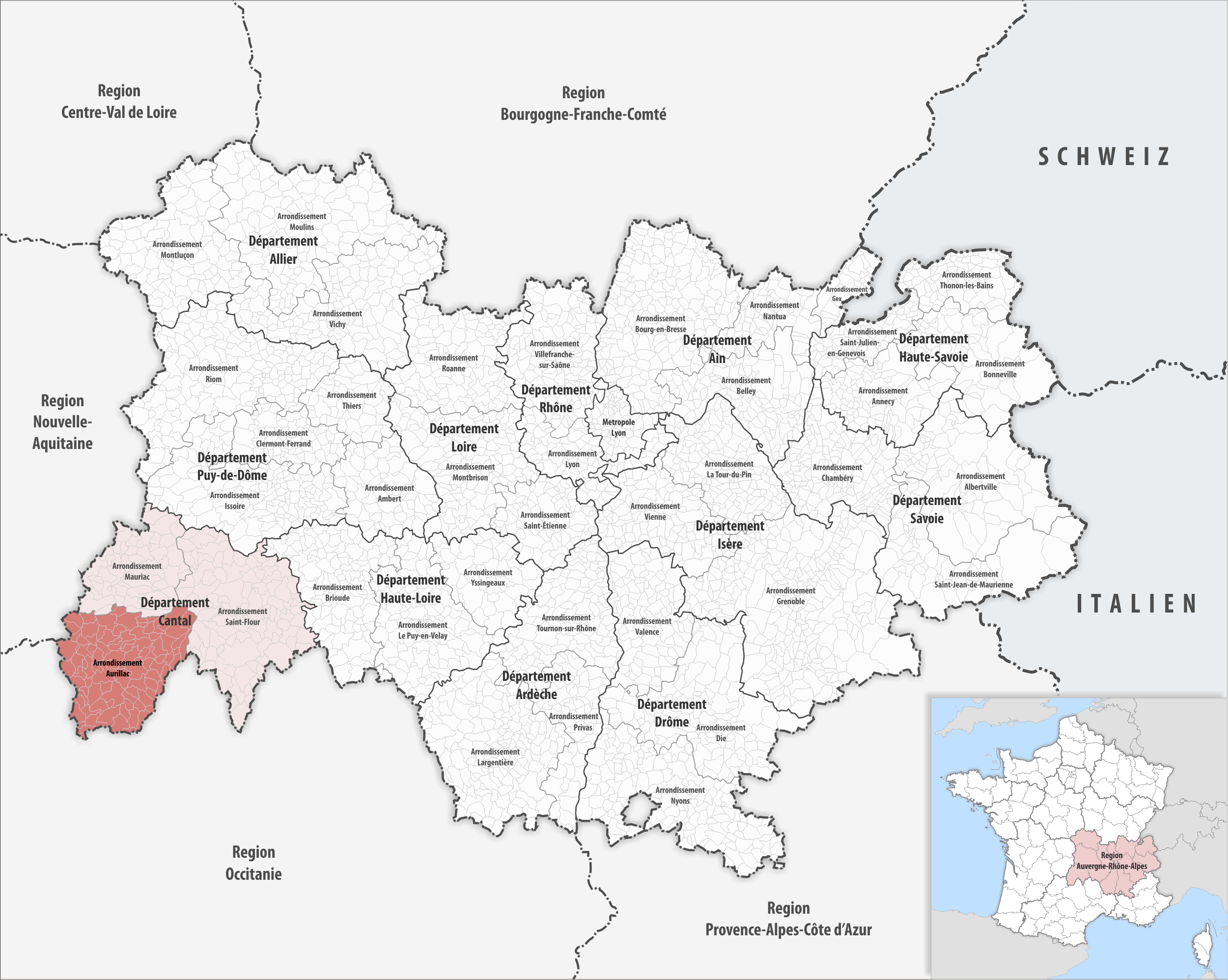
- Location within the region Auvergne-Rhône-Alpes
- Country: France
- Region: Auvergne-Rhône-Alpes
- Department: Cantal
- No. of communes: {{{nbcomm}}}
- Area: 1,936.9 km^{2} (747.8 sq mi)
- Population (2023): 82,855
  - Density: 42.777/km^{2} (110.79/sq mi)
- INSEE code: 151

The arrondissement of Aurillac is an arrondissement of France in the Cantal department in the Auvergne-Rhône-Alpes region. It has 93 communes. Its population is 82,237 (2021), and its area is 1,936.9 km^{2} (747.8 sq mi).

== Composition ==
The communes of the arrondissement of Aurillac, and their INSEE codes, are:

1. Arnac (15011)
2. Arpajon-sur-Cère (15012)
3. Aurillac (15014)
4. Ayrens (15016)
5. Badailhac (15017)
6. Besse (15269)
7. Boisset (15021)
8. Carlat (15028)
9. Cassaniouze (15029)
10. Cayrols (15030)
11. Crandelles (15056)
12. Cros-de-Montvert (15057)
13. Cros-de-Ronesque (15058)
14. Freix-Anglards (15072)
15. Giou-de-Mamou (15074)
16. Girgols (15075)
17. Glénat (15076)
18. Jou-sous-Monjou (15081)
19. Junhac (15082)
20. Jussac (15083)
21. Labesserette (15084)
22. Labrousse (15085)
23. Lacapelle-Viescamp (15088)
24. Lacapelle-del-Fraisse (15087)
25. Ladinhac (15089)
26. Lafeuillade-en-Vézie (15090)
27. Lapeyrugue (15093)
28. Laroquebrou (15094)
29. Laroquevieille (15095)
30. Lascelle (15096)
31. Leucamp (15103)
32. Leynhac (15104)
33. Mandailles-Saint-Julien (15113)
34. Marcolès (15117)
35. Marmanhac (15118)
36. Maurs (15122)
37. Montmurat (15133)
38. Montsalvy (15134)
39. Montvert (15135)
40. Naucelles (15140)
41. Nieudan (15143)
42. Omps (15144)
43. Pailherols (15146)
44. Parlan (15147)
45. Polminhac (15154)
46. Prunet (15156)
47. Puycapel (15027)
48. Quézac (15157)
49. Raulhac (15159)
50. Reilhac (15160)
51. Roannes-Saint-Mary (15163)
52. Rouffiac (15165)
53. Le Rouget-Pers (15268)
54. Roumégoux (15166)
55. Rouziers (15167)
56. Saint-Antoine (15172)
57. Saint-Cernin (15175)
58. Saint-Cirgues-de-Jordanne (15178)
59. Saint-Cirgues-de-Malbert (15179)
60. Saint-Clément (15180)
61. Saint-Constant-Fournoulès (15181)
62. Saint-Étienne-Cantalès (15182)
63. Saint-Étienne-de-Carlat (15183)
64. Saint-Étienne-de-Maurs (15184)
65. Saint-Gérons (15189)
66. Saint-Illide (15191)
67. Saint-Jacques-des-Blats (15192)
68. Saint-Julien-de-Toursac (15194)
69. Saint-Mamet-la-Salvetat (15196)
70. Saint-Paul-des-Landes (15204)
71. Saint-Santin-Cantalès (15211)
72. Saint-Santin-de-Maurs (15212)
73. Saint-Saury (15214)
74. Saint-Simon (15215)
75. Saint-Victor (15217)
76. Sansac-Veinazès (15222)
77. Sansac-de-Marmiesse (15221)
78. La Ségalassière (15224)
79. Sénezergues (15226)
80. Siran (15228)
81. Teissières-de-Cornet (15233)
82. Teissières-lès-Bouliès (15234)
83. Thiézac (15236)
84. Tournemire (15238)
85. Le Trioulou (15242)
86. Velzic (15252)
87. Vézac (15255)
88. Vezels-Roussy (15257)
89. Vic-sur-Cère (15258)
90. Vieillevie (15260)
91. Vitrac (15264)
92. Yolet (15266)
93. Ytrac (15267)

== History ==
The arrondissement of Aurillac was created in 1800.

As a result of the reorganisation of the cantons of France which came into effect in 2015, the borders of the cantons are no longer related to the borders of the arrondissements. The cantons of the arrondissement of Aurillac were, as of January 2015:

1. Arpajon-sur-Cère
2. Aurillac-1
3. Aurillac-2
4. Aurillac-3
5. Aurillac-4
6. Jussac
7. Laroquebrou
8. Maurs
9. Montsalvy
10. Saint-Cernin
11. Saint-Mamet-la-Salvetat
12. Vic-sur-Cère
