= Laroquebrou =

Commune in Auvergne-Rhône-Alpes, France

- Commune
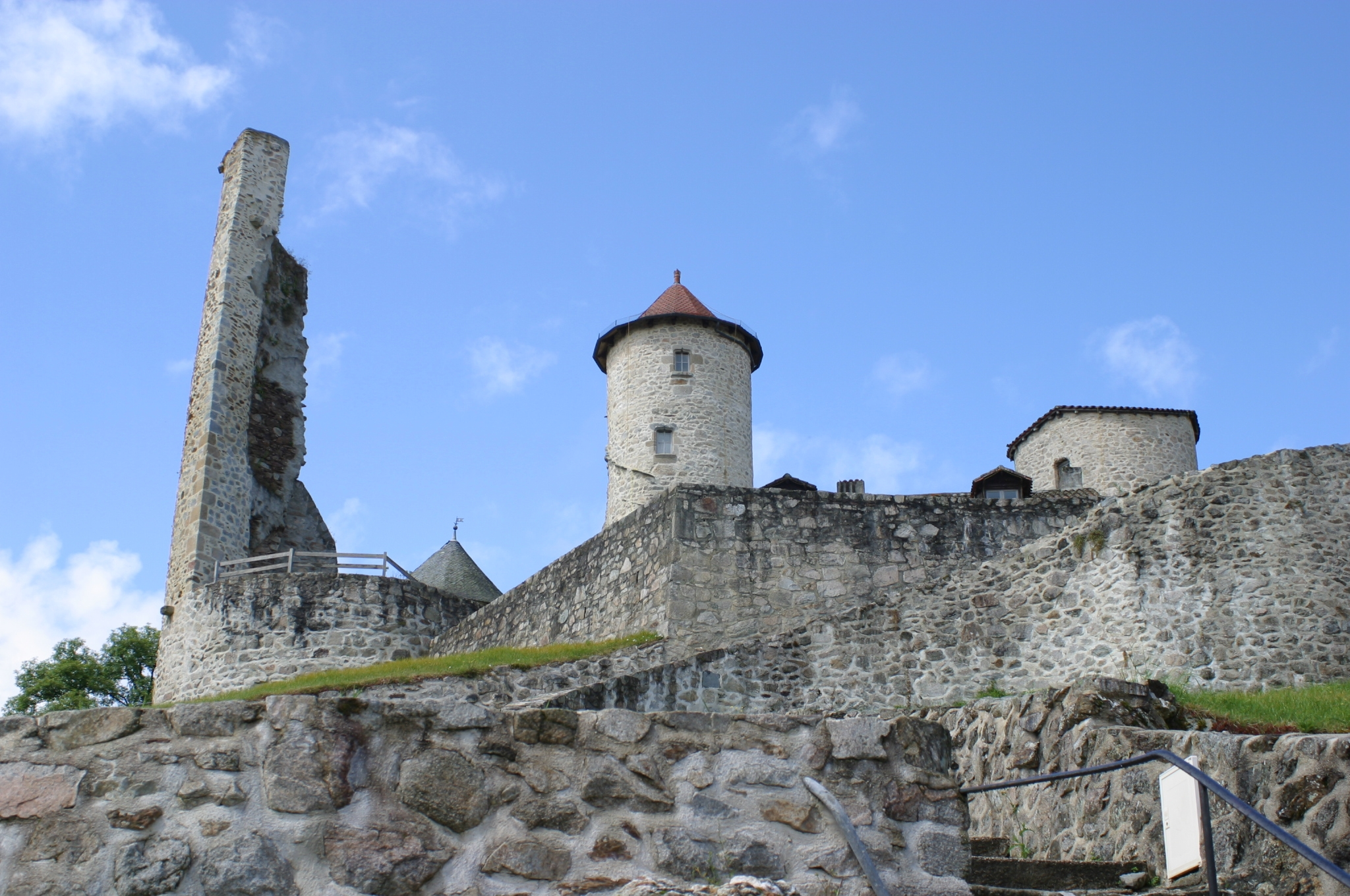
- The Chateau de Laroquebrou

- Coat of arms
- Location of Laroquebrou
- Location within France Location within Auvergne-Rhône-Alpes
- Coordinates: 44°58′10″N 2°11′33″E
- Country: France
- Region: Auvergne-Rhône-Alpes
- Department: Cantal
- Arrondissement: Aurillac
- Canton: Saint-Paul-des-Landes

Government
  - Mayor (2020–2026): Pascal Malvezin
- Area^{1}: 17.15 km^{2} (6.62 sq mi)
- Elevation: 440 m (1,440 ft)
- Highest elevation: 693 m (2,274 ft)
- Lowest elevation: 429 m (1,407 ft)
- Population (2023): 785
  - Density: 45.8/km^{2} (119/sq mi)
- Time zone: UTC+01:00 (CET)
  - Summer (DST): UTC+02:00 (CEST)
- INSEE/Postal code: 15094 /15150
- ^{1} French Land Register data, which excludes lakes, ponds, glaciers > 1 km^{2} (0.386 sq mi or 247 acres) and river estuaries.

Laroquebrou (French pronunciation: [laʁɔk(ə)bʁu]; Occitan: La Ròcabrau) is a commune in the Cantal department in south-central France.

== Population ==
Historical population
Year	Pop.	±% p.a.
1968	1,193	—
1975	1,014	−2.30%
1982	1,023	+0.13%
1990	1,048	+0.30%
1999	1,080	+0.33%
2007	986	−1.13%
2012	803	−4.02%
2017	880	+1.85%
2023	785	−1.89%
Source: INSEE

== See also ==
- Communes of the Cantal department
