= Execution by drowning =

Method of execution

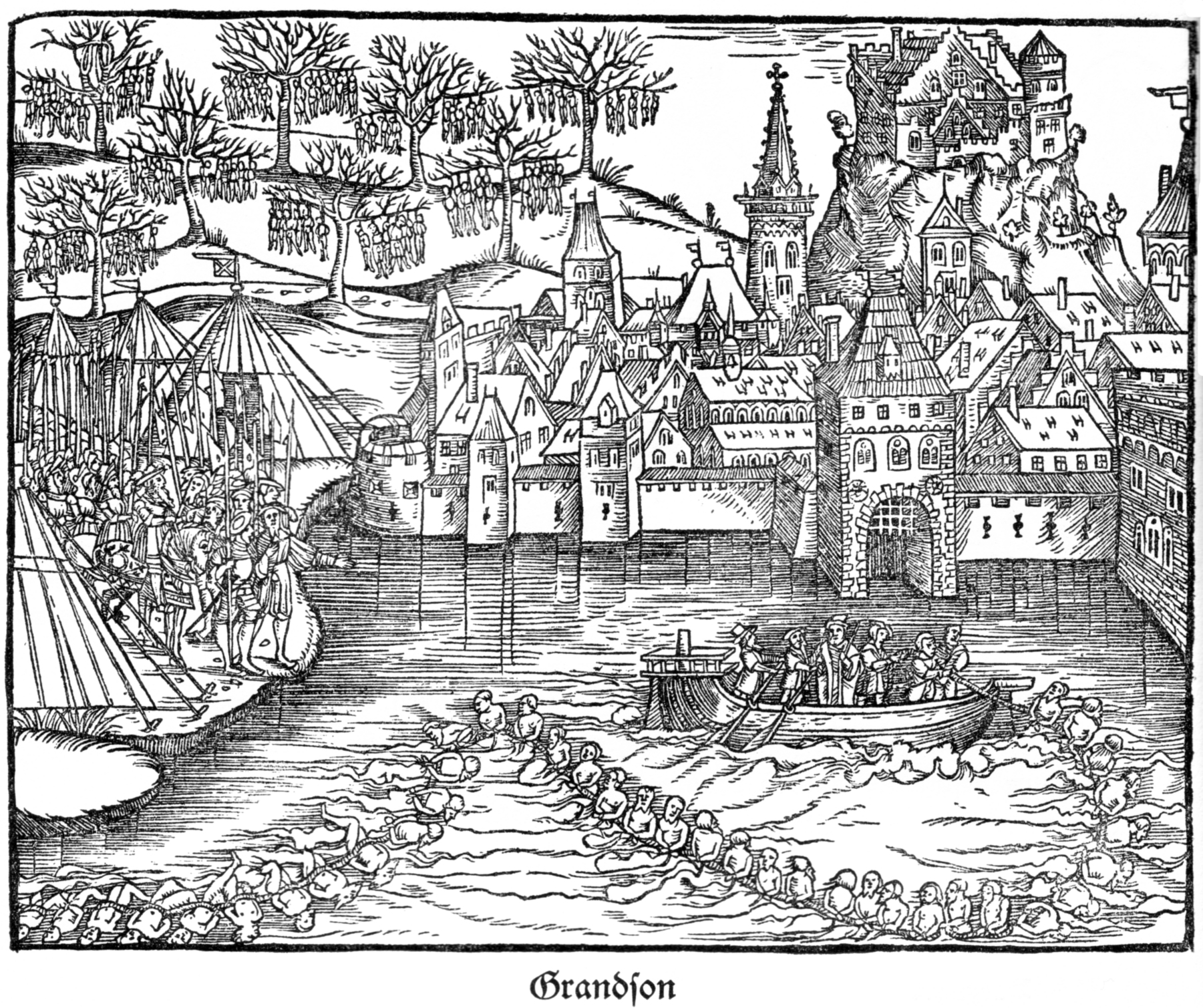
Drowning of Swiss soldiers in Lake Neuchâtel by Charles the Bold in 1476, on the eve of the Battle of Grandson

Drowning as a method of execution is attested very early in history, for a large variety of cultures and as the method of execution for many types of offences.

== Prohibition on shedding royal blood ==
In a variety of cultures, taboos against shedding the blood of royals are attested, and in many cultures, when the execution of a king or members of the royal family was thought necessary, they were drowned to avoid the spilling of blood. In Cambodia, for example, drowning was the type of execution reserved for members of the royal family. Felix Carey, missionary in Burma 1806–1812, describes the process as follows:

When a person of royal extraction is to receive a capital punishment, it is generally done by drowning; in the first place the person is tied hands and feet, then sewed up in a red bag, which again is sometimes put into a jar, and thus the prisoner is lowered down into the water, with a weight sufficient to sink him. This practice is resorted to because it is reckoned a sin to spill royal blood

In another Asian country, the Kingdom of Assam, it was a royal privilege to execute people by shedding their blood; lower courts of justice could only order death by drowning, death by cudgelling in the head of the condemned and so on.

Within Islamic cultures as well, some examples exist that the royal person, or members of the royal family ought not be executed by means of bloodshed, or members of similarly highly respected families. For example, in the former Sultanate of Pattani, in nowadays southern Thailand one rebel, Tuk Mir, was drowned in the sea, out of respect for his recognized status as Syed, that is, a direct descendant of Muhammad. Within the Ottoman Empire, it became, for some time, a practice to execute the brothers of the chosen sultan in order to prevent political succession crises; but these members of the royal family were typically strangled or drowned, so that their blood would not be shed.

The reluctance to shed the king's blood is also attested within a number of African cultures. In his "The Golden Bough", James Frazer refers to this custom of drowning royal offenders instead both among the Ashanti people (in present-day Ghana and the Ivory Coast) and in the kingdom of Dahomey (in present-day Benin). Frazer also provides a number of other examples of executions of royals such that blood would not be shed, for example by means of strangling, starving or burning to death the royal personage.

== Dissolution of practice ==
In Europe, some cases regarded as the last instances of drowning occurred during the latter half of the 16th century. The reported last cases in Esslingen and Württemberg, for example, occurred in 1589 and 1593, respectively. 1562, in Rothenburg, a woman was drowned for infanticide, but from the statistics provided in the source, this was the last such case; later on, women found guilty of infanticide were beheaded here. In 1580 Nuremberg, the executioner Franz Schmidt (who left a diary over his professional career from 1573 to 1617), used his influence to abolish the penalty of drowning, persuading the authorities to use hanging or beheading instead. Within Scotland and German areas, however, the 17th century is regarded as the time when this executional practice began to fade out in favour of beheading, while cases are still found well into the 18th century. The last case in Frankfurt am Main is said to have occurred in 1613. In Großenhain, the last woman to be drowned occurred in 1622, and the punishment was replaced by beheading, or being broken on the wheel. In Quedlinburg, a woman was drowned in 1667 for killing her infant; just 6 years later, a similarly guilty woman was beheaded there on the market place instead. In Switzerland, the last case of judicial drowning occurred in 1652. In Russia, the practice seems to have been abolished in the early 18th century, whereas on Iceland, the last case of judicial drowning is said to have taken place in 1776.

== Recent examples ==
In a recent example, the unrecognized Islamic State of Iraq and the Levant executed captured Iraqi prisoners by drowning them in a cage in June 2015. A video of the event was circulated on the Internet. It is an example of crimes against humanity perpetrated by the Islamic State.

== See also ==
- Bog body
- Poena cullei
- Republican marriage
- Drownings at Nantes
- Drowning-pit

== Bibliography ==
- Battonn, Johann G.; Euler, Ludwig H. (1861). Oertliche Beschreibung der Stadt Frankfurt am Main. Vol. 1. Frankfurt am Main: Verlag des Vereins für Geschichte und Alterthumskunde zu Frankfurt a.M.
- Carey, Felix (February 1815). "Punishments practised by the Burmans". The Baptist Magazine. 7. London: W.Button&Son: 65–68.
- Chambers, W&R (1870). Chambers's Encyclopædia: A Dictionary of Universal Knowledge for the People. Vol. 3. Philadelphia: J. B. Lippincott & Company.
- Chladenius, Carl G.T. (1788). Materialien zur Großenhayner Stadtchronik: davon der erste Theil die Beschreibung und Verfaßung und der zweete Theil die Jahrbegebenheiten der Stadt enthält, aus Archiven, Chroniken, Urkunden, Stadt- und Kirchenbüchern, Handschriften und andern Nachrichten zusammengetragen. Pirna: Schuffenhauerschen Schriften.
- Fritsch, Johann H. (1828). Geschichte des vormaligen Reichsstifts und der Stadt Quedlinburg. Vol. 2. Quedlinburg: G. Basse.
- Jacobsen, Trudy (2008). Lost Goddesses: The Denial of Female Power in Cambodian History. Copenhagen, Denmark: NIAS Press. ISBN 9788776940010.
- Falarti, Maziar Mozaffari (2012). Malay Kingship in Kedah: Religion, Trade, and Society. Plymouth, UK: Lexington Books. ISBN 9780739168431.
- Feldman, Ruth Tenzer (2008). The Fall of Constantinople. Minneapolis, MN: Twenty-First Century Books. ISBN 9780761340263.
- Frazer, James (2012). The Golden Bough. Cambridge, UK: Cambridge University Press. ISBN 9781108047326.
- von Knonau, Gerold M (1846). 1901 Reprint: Der canton Zürich, historisch-geographisch-statistisch geschildert von den ältesten zeiten bis auf die gegenwart. Vol. 2. Zürich: Huber und compagnie.
- Quataert, Donald (2005). The Ottoman Empire, 1700–1922. Cambridge, UK: Cambridge University Press. ISBN 9781139445917.
- Rohman, Wakidur (2005). Historical Development of Legal Literature on Customary Laws in Assam: A Critical Study. Delhi: Kalpaz Publications. ISBN 9788178354286.
- Rublack, Ulrika (1999). The Crimes of Women in Early Modern Germany. Oxford: Oxford University Press. ISBN 9780198206378.
- Siebenkees, Johann C. (1792). Materialien zur Nürnbergischen Geschichte. Vol. 2. Nuremberg: Schneider.
- Welch, Michael (2013). Corrections: A Critical Approach. London: Routledge. ISBN 9781136842740.
- von Winterbach, Johann D. W. (1826). Geschichte der Stadt Rothenburg an der Tauber und ihres Gebietes: mit topographisch-statistischer Darstellung nach reichsstädtischer und bayerischer Verfassung. Vol. 1. Rothenburg an der Tauber.
