= Republican marriage =

French execution method

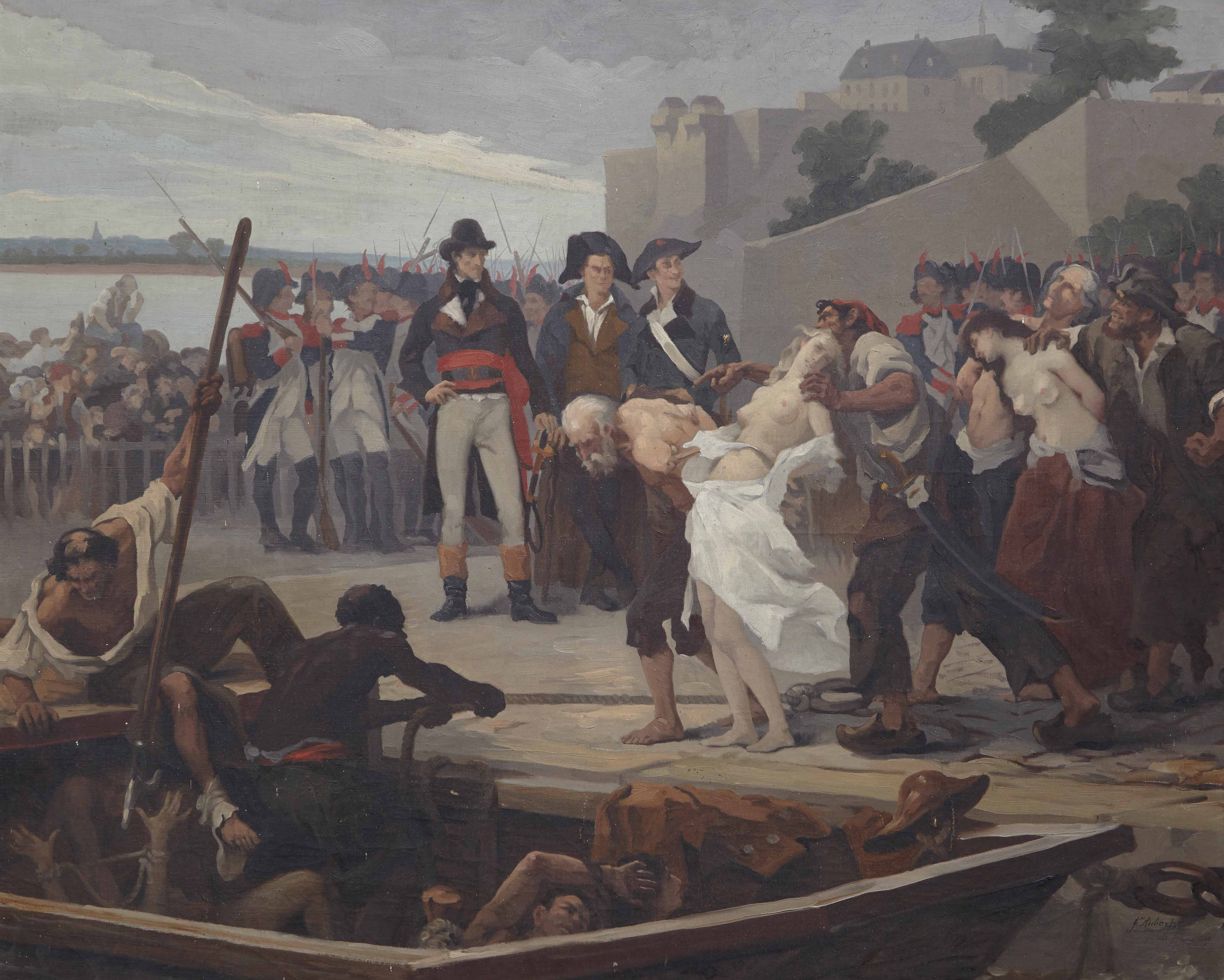
Painting by Joseph Aubert depicting preparations for a Republican marriage

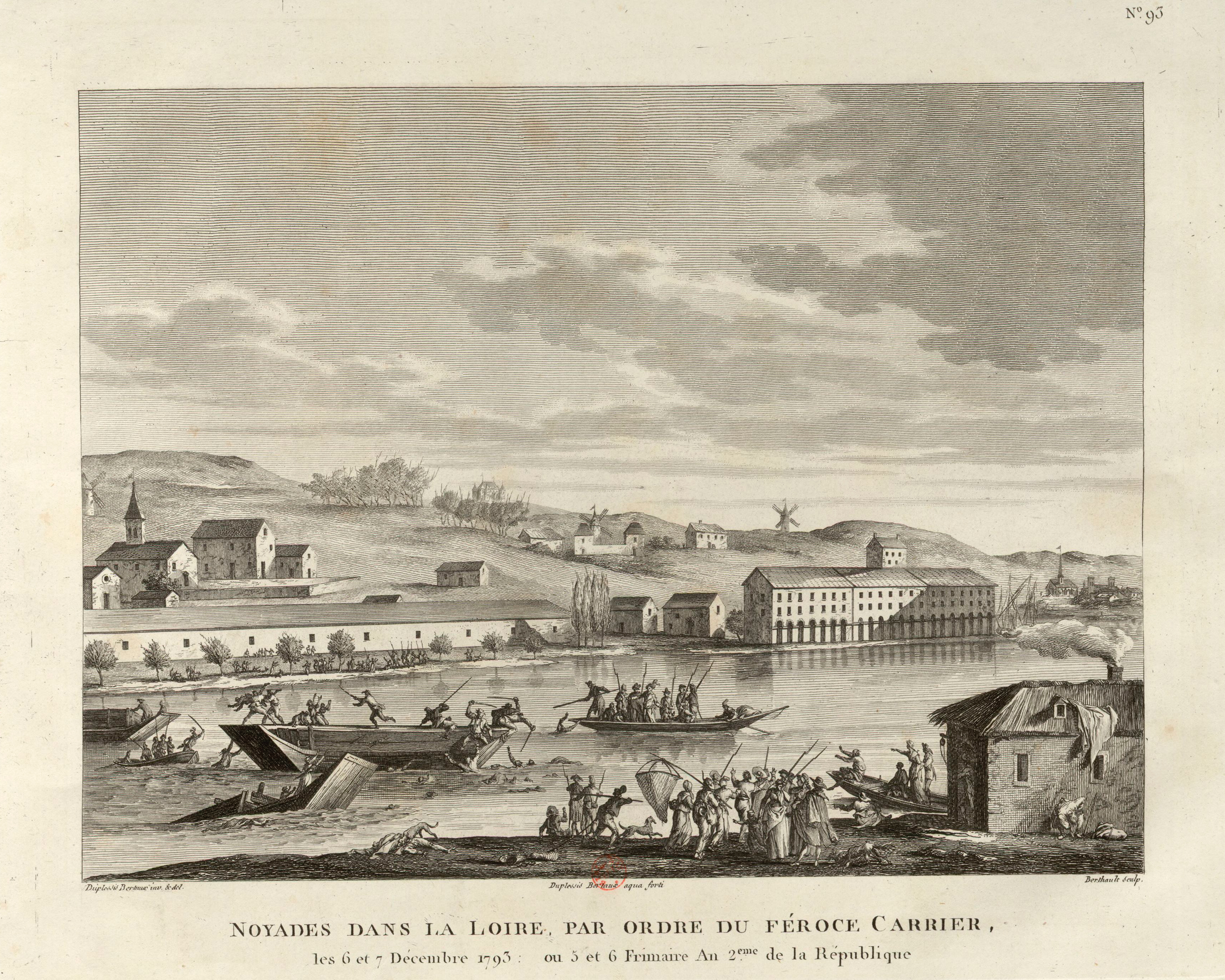
Painting by Jean Duplessis-Bertaux depicting the executions at Nantes.

Republican marriage (French: mariage républicain) was a method of execution that allegedly occurred in Nantes during the Reign of Terror in Revolutionary France and "involved tying a naked man and woman together and drowning them". This was reported to have been practised during the drownings at Nantes (noyades) that were ordered by local Jacobin representative-on-mission Jean-Baptiste Carrier between November 1793 and January 1794 in the city of Nantes. Most accounts indicate that the victims were drowned in the river Loire, although a few sources describe an alternative means of execution in which the bound couple is run through with a sword, either before, or instead of drowning.

The earliest reports of such "marriages" date from 1794, when Carrier was tried for his crimes, and they were soon cited by contemporary counter-revolutionary authors such as Louis-Marie Prudhomme and Louis Gabriel Ambroise de Bonald.

== Etymology ==
The use of the term appears to be a mockery of the concept of "republican marriage" as an actual "secular" marriage. Books describe parents horrified to learn that their children planned a "republican marriage" instead of being married in a church. As one source describes the institution:

At the time Napoleon and Josephine were married (in March 1796), "few people considered the religious ceremony at all necessary: people got married with so much facility, and in so simple a manner, that the exaggeration is merely verbal which states that the republican marriage ceremony was completed by dancing round a tree of liberty, and that the divorce was effected by dancing round the same tree of liberty backwards".

== Description ==
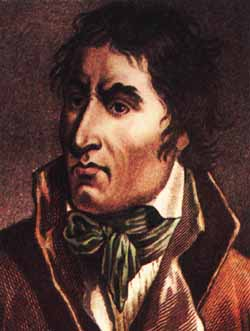
Jean-Baptiste Carrier is popularly cited as having devised this method of execution.

This form of execution is attributed to French Revolutionary Jean-Baptiste Carrier, who was sent to Nantes to suppress the counterrevolutionary forces and to appoint a Revolutionary Committee. One historian described the use of the practice as follows:

A Revolutionary Tribunal was established [at Nantes], of which Carrier was the presiding demon—Carrier, known in all nations as the inventor of that last of barbarous atrocities, the Republican Marriage, in which two persons of different genders, generally an old man and an old woman, or a young man and a young woman, bereft of every kind of clothing, were bound together before the multitude, exposed in a boat in that situation for half an hour or more, and then thrown into the river.

Details of the practice vary slightly, but are generally consistent with the description offered above. One author described how "marriages Républicains... consisted in binding together a man and woman, back to back, stripped naked, keeping them exposed for an hour, and then hurling them into the current of "la Baignoire Nationale", as the bloodhounds termed the Loire". British radical and Girondist sympathizer Helen Maria Williams, in her Sketch of the Politics of France, 1793–94, wrote that "innocent young women were unclothed in the presence of the monsters; and, to add a deeper horror to this infernal act of cruelty, were tied to young men, and both were cut down with sabers, or thrown into the river; and this kind of murder was called a republican marriage".

According to literary scholar Steven Blakemore, Williams seems to have regarded this as a form of "terrorist misogynism". Williams' description of the women as "innocent", in his view, "not only suggests that they were not guilty of aiding the rebels, but that they were young 'virgins'". He argues that in Williams' text, the male Jacobin executioners are portrayed as "sadistic, public voyeurs who delight in tying 'counter-revolutionary' men and women into forced positions of sterile intercourse, in a grotesque 'marriage' of the soon-to-be dead". Thus, "if the Old Regime, for Williams, represents the forced confinement of female beauty, the Terror represents beauty's degrading death".

== Skepticism ==
While the executions of men, women and children by drowning in Nantes is not generally disputed, the factual nature of the "republican marriages," in particular, has been doubted by several historians who alleged it to be a legend. The claim that such a manner of execution has been practised and ordered by Carrier appears for the first time in the trial of the members of the Revolutionary Committee of Nantes by the Revolutionary Tribunal in 1794. It was present in the report of Charles-Gilbert Romme and in several letters and witness testimonies. However, while a few witnesses asserted that they had heard about "republican marriages", none had actually seen one; one cited a drunken boatman who had used the term "civic marriage" but hadn't suggested that the executed were paired according to sex. As both the assistant-prosecutor and the defence mentioned, there was not enough evidence for that particular accusation, and it was crossed out from the indictment by the president of the jury. The remaining facts were entirely sufficient for Carrier and several of his closest accomplices to be sentenced to death. The reports of "republican marriages" nevertheless became well-known and were later cited by many authors writing about the Terror, who would elaborate on them, for example by adding the claim that the two victims were a priest and a nun.

== See also ==
- Dechristianization of France during the French Revolution
