= Guillaume Lamberty =

French revolutionary (1754-1794)

Guillaume Lambery
- Born: 22 April 1754
- Died: 17 April 1794 (aged 39)
- Cause of death: Death penalty

Guillaume Lamberty (22 April 1754 in Pontchâteau to 17 April 1794) was a French revolutionary.

He was involved as adjutant-general in the Drownings at Nantes during the French Revolution.

He was later condemned to death by the Bignon Commission and guillotined.
