= Bignon Commission (French Revolution) =

The Bignon Commission (French: commission Bignon; 1793–1794) was a French military tribunal that terrorized Nantes during the French Revolution. The president of the tribunal was Antoine Gonchon but it came to be known after François Bignon, captain of the 2nd battalion of Paris Volunteers, who directed most of its proceedings.

During the Reign of Terror, the radicals had little trust in their revolutionary committees who acted as a leadership group. With living conditions and hunger still an issue even after King Louis XVI's death, the people were unsatisfied with the new leadership in the committees and oftentimes, they were fearful of the committees. As a result, counter-revolutionary groups formed. These counter-revolutionaries believed that they were following the true ideals of the revolution, while the committees saw them as a threat instead. While some counter-revolutionaries were trained, groups such as the Vendée mostly used guerrilla warfare as a tactic to fight. The Vendée were responsible for many revolts and as a result, they caused a big uproar. Generals of the Vendée often clashed with the leaders of the Committee of Public Safety. The creation of military commissions such as the Bignon Commission were intended to stop counter-revolutionary groups from rallying support and inciting violence. By ending rebellious behavior, the goal was to ultimately unite the ideals of the French Revolution once again.

== The Vendée/ the Vendéans ==
The Vendée were a counter-revolutionary group who were seen as a threat to the French Revolution. Any group that appeared to not believe in the true ideals of the revolution were considered counter-revolutionary, and during the Reign of Terror, many were quickly tried and often sentenced to death. In this way, the Committee of Public Safety only acted against them because they were seen as a big enough threat to the revolution. As a result, military commissions were created, such as the Bignon Commission to stop groups like the Vendée.

The Committee of Public Safety felt that their rebellious nature had to be suppressed before it spread to the general public. The Vendée was a violent group, as they revolted in massacres and attacks against the Republic. The Vendée were a group of pious individuals who typically practiced guerilla warfare in their attacks. They were against the Republic and the committees. They generally did not keep prisoners of war, nor did they want to kill them. They would often set their prisoners free even if it was the republican enemy. In fact, Charles-Melchior de Bonchamps ordered that 5,000 republican prisoners of war be set free.

== The Creation of Military Commissions ==
Military commissions were created 9 October 1792. There were five judges which consisted of everyday people or soldiers. People who were tried were sentenced to death. These military commissions were initially created to put emigres on trial, but by 19 March 1793, the law changed. Rebels who had weapons or other political counter-revolutionaries were put on trial under the military commissions which is similar to a criminal court today. However, since the people who were tried were considered to be political radicals and a threat to the French Revolution, they were tried quickly and few were actually put in prison; the majority of the people tried were killed.

The Bignon Commission was created in Le Mans, 14 December 1793, by the représentants en mission Pierre Bourbotte, Louis Turreau and Pierre-Louis Prieur. The Bignon Commission was one military commission created among 60 others that was intended to catch the rebels who were accused of counter-revolutionary behavior and later who had fled out of fear during the Reign of Terror. They were intended to be tried quickly and then sentenced to death. There were 8,000 people executed, and it was based on judicial law. The accused were not allowed to have a lawyer. The military officials and citizens were able to act as judges and the court decisions had to be made immediately. Others such as the Brutus and Frey Commissions, and the Parein and Felix Commission, executed many people, but the Lenoir and Bignon Commissions could be responsible for the most deaths, counting at 4,000 in Nantes, Savenay and Paimboeuf. Still in the Maine-et-Loire department, which was basically the Parein and Felix commission's area of action, thousands of people were executed like in the Avrille massacres counting maybe 1300 deaths. Jean-jacques Hussenet indeed estimated that in this department alone 6300 to 7000 people were victims of repression by violent deaths (essentially executions.) during the 1793-1794 period. Thus, the Parein and Felix commission might have even executed more persons than the Lenoir and Bignon Commissions together.

By April 1794, the Revolutionary Tribunal of Paris was in charge of handling counter-revolutionary cases by law. Any local commission or tribunal that was once able to try emigres, rebels, or clergy were no longer granted that power unless the Committee of Public Safety gave them the right to do so. This decision helped to put an end to the Reign of Terror in suppression of tribunals and military commissions such as the Bignon Commission. In the last months of the Reign of Terror, the remaining executions occurred in places such as Bordeaux, Nîmes and Arras.

== Executions ==
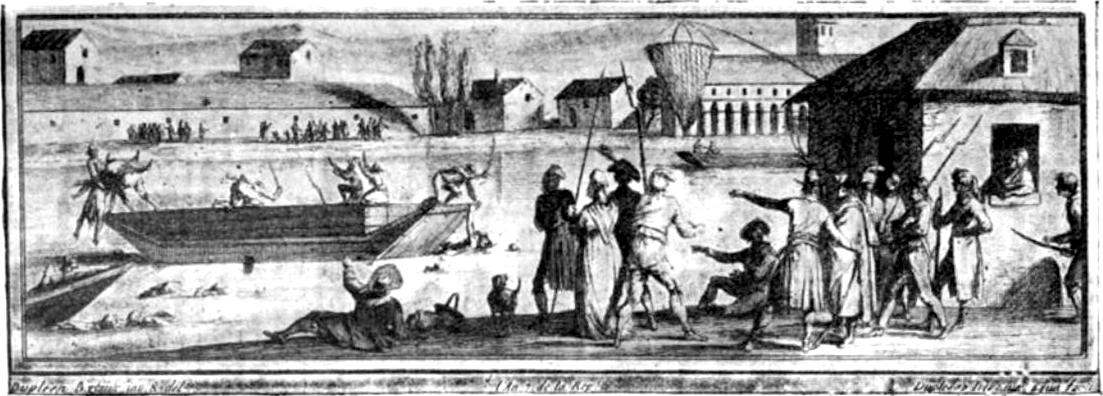
On 23 December 1793, an important battle in the War of the Vendee, the Battle of Savenay took place. The republicans won this battle and The Bignon Commission was responsible for many deaths after the end of the battle. Counter-revolutionaries prisoners were basically drowned, shot, and put in prison.

The Reign of Terror caused great fear and distrust of the committees because of their power in the swift creation of military commissions to shut down counter-revolutionary groups. Many people felt that the military commissions were unjust and were too violent and the power that the committees had was too much. The quick trials and the sudden mass executions contributed to the fear of the time period.

Once counter-revolutionaries such as the Vendée were captured, they were given a swift trial and the majority were executed. Most people were executed by shooting ranges, including girls as young at 17. By 1794, about eighty people were killed per day. Many people were also drowned during the so-called drownings at Nantes. People were tied together, herded on boats, and then drowned in packs. No records were kept of this event. Alongside the commissions, the local militia supported the initiative. For example, the Marat Company was able to execute large groups of people with Jean-Baptiste Carrier’s support, who was in favor of quick execution in order to free more prison space for radicals and anyone else against the ideals of the French Revolution.

== See also ==
- Bignon Commission (1693–1718), a separate commission which began work on the Descriptions of the Arts and Trades of France
