= Drownings at Nantes =

Executions in France during the Reign of Terror (1793–94)

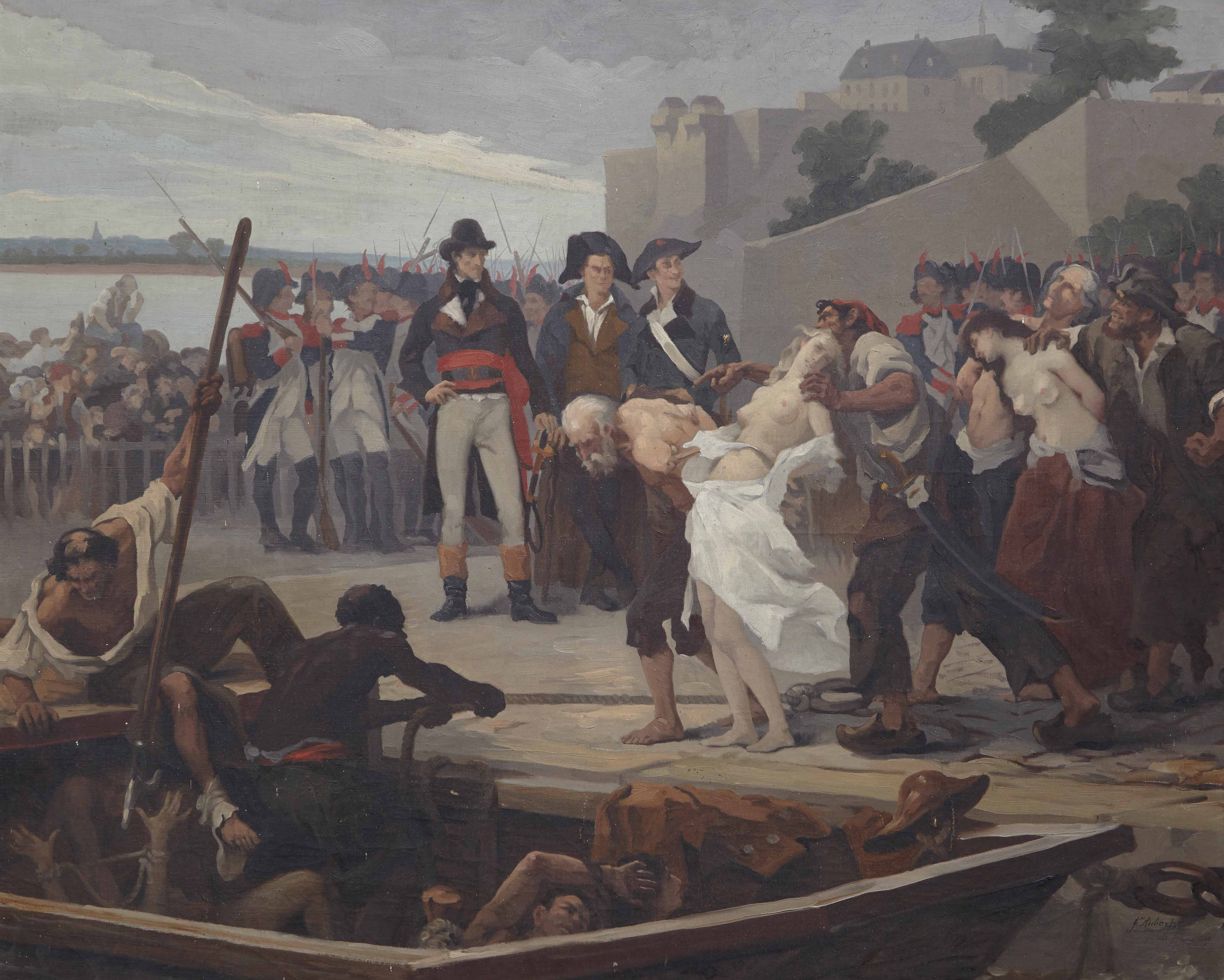
1882 painting of the drownings

The drownings at Nantes (French: noyades de Nantes; Breton: beuzioù e Naoned) were a series of mass executions by drowning during the Reign of Terror in Nantes, France, that occurred between November 1793 and February 1794. During this period, anyone arrested and jailed for not consistently supporting the Revolution, or suspected of being a royalist sympathizer, especially Catholic priests and nuns, was cast into the river Loire and drowned on the orders of Jean-Baptiste Carrier, the representative-on-mission in Nantes. Before the drownings ceased, as many as four thousand or more people, including innocent families with women and children, died in what Carrier himself called "the national bathtub".

== Background ==
Catholic clergy and émigrés had been victims of angry pro-republican violence and forced deportations by sans-culottes since the Decree of 17 November 1791 went into force. However, it was the Law of Suspects (French: Loi des suspects) approved by the National Convention of the French First Republic on 17 September 1793 that swept the nation with "revolutionary paranoia". This decree defined a broad range of conduct as suspicious in the vaguest terms, and did not give individuals any means of redress.

Nantes, in particular, was besieged by the tragedies of the French civil war in the Vendée at its doorstep. Threats of epidemics and starvation were always present. Battles, skirmishes, and police actions led to the incarceration of more than ten thousand prisoners of war within its confines, and simply feeding them became an enormous burden for the city's residents. To control the situation, the leaders of the National Convention put Jean-Baptiste Carrier, a native of the Auvergne region, in charge of obtaining food supplies for Republican soldiers in Nantes. He soon became responsible for furnishing provisions to the entire local population, as well as for maintaining order and putting down suspected royalist revolts.

Fear that contagious diseases, particularly typhus, would spread from prisoners to the general population reached levels of panic in the autumn of 1793. Heavy losses of inmates' lives recorded by military personnel, physicians, nurses, and even judges, shocked civic leaders and pushed them to try anything to stop the further spread of illness. Ultimately, they chose to empty the jails in the city center and to place the inmates at the Coffee Warehouse jail at the port and on vessels moored in the harbor.

== Mass killings ==
=== Beginnings ===
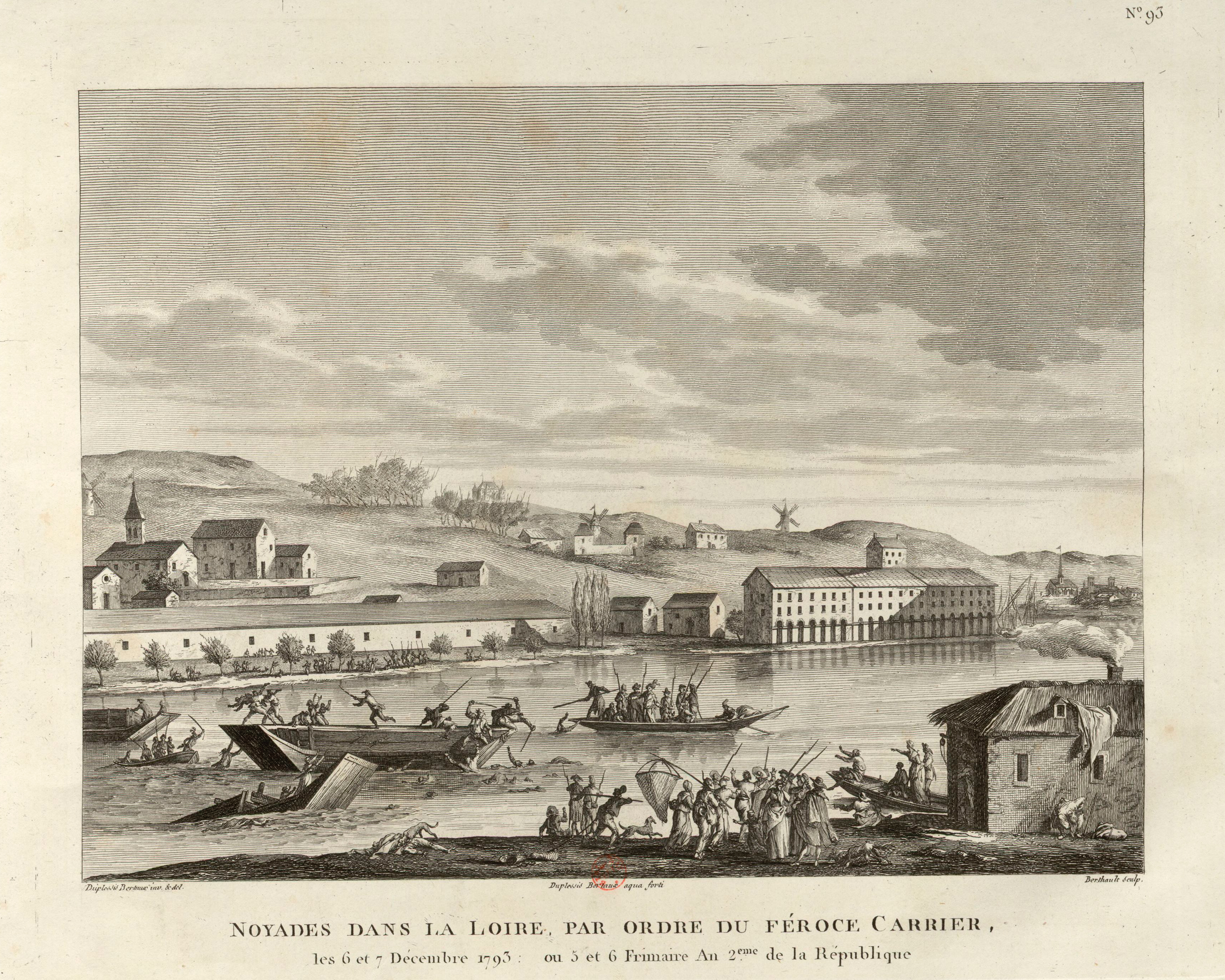
Painting by Jean Duplessis-Bertaux depicting the executions at Nantes.

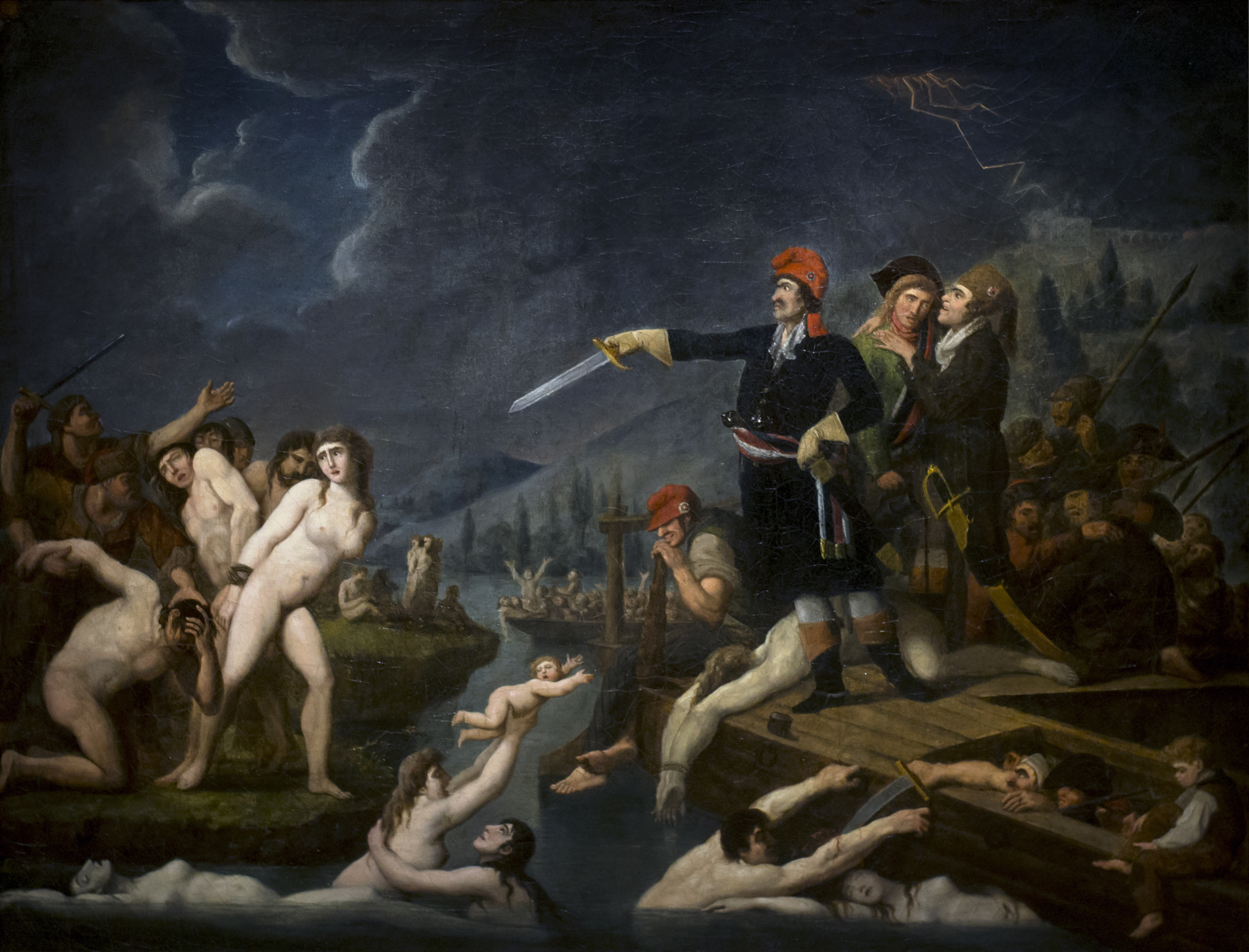
The Drownings at Nantes, anonymous period painting, Musée d'histoire de Nantes

The first drownings happened on the night of 16 November 1793 (26 Brumaire Year II of the French Republic). The victims were 160 Catholic priests known as 'refractory clergy' (French: clergé réfractaire) who had been arrested in the area. After being initially held at Saint-Clément Convent, they were moved in the summer of 1793 to the Carmelite Mission in Nantes because it had been converted into a prison. On 5 July, they were sent to Chantenay-sur-Loire, a district of the town immediately west of Nantes, where they were held on the barge La Thérèse. The group suffered miserably from the sun and summer heat. Between 19 July and 6 August, most of the priests were transferred to the friary of the Petits Capucins and the Hermitage, which also were prisons. But on 25 October, the Revolutionary Committee of Nantes ordered that the priests be sent back to the docks to be held on the barge La Gloire.

On the night of the drownings, Adjutant-General Guillaume Lamberty and Fouquet moored a barge that had been specially customized by shipwrights at the docks. They directed O'Sullivan, a master of arms and his men, to transfer 90 prisoners from the La Gloire onto the adapted barge. The barge was then pulled out into the river where the priests were executed. Nearly all drowned as planned; however, three men were rescued by sailors on the warship L'Imposant who gave them spirits and warm blankets. Captain Lafloury was ordered to hand them back to the Revolutionary Committee of Nantes. After being returned to jail, the three perished with the second group of priests who were drowned the next night. Only one priest, named Father Landeau, survived the killings because, as an excellent swimmer, he managed to escape during a struggle, jumped from the barge into the Loire, and swam to safety.

The only first-person account of these first drownings was a ship's gunner named Wailly, who served on the boat La Samaritaine. He described meeting Lamberty and Fouquet who oversaw the killings. He also described hearing the desperate screams of the drowning men, rousing his comrades who heard the same cries, and the silence that came after they had died in the Loire.

=== Second drownings ===
Guillaume Lamberty oversaw the second mass drowning of priests. His guards, led by Marat Foucauld, stripped 58 clergymen who had been transported from Angers. They were again put on a specially equipped barge. But this time they were taken to the mouth of the river Loire far from the port of Nantes: there were no survivors.

=== Escalation ===
On the evening of 4 December 1793 (14 Frimaire, Year II), there was a meeting of key members of the Revolutionary Committee of Nantes: Jean-Baptiste Carrier, François-Louis Phélippes Tronjolly and colleagues, Julien Minée for the department, Renard for the city, and representatives of the Société populaire de Nantes. In the course of heated discussions, they appointed a jury to name so-called "criminals". The next day, the jury presented more than three hundred names on a list, which became orders for execution. To carry out the judgements, Carrier proposed what he euphemistically called "vertical deportation": rather than deporting criminals to an overseas penal colony, instead loading them onto flat bottom boats and casting them overboard in the middle of the Loire at the village of Chantenay. The executions were to be carried out secretly at night, but the committee became worried of public disapproval when the corpses began floating to the surface, sometimes days later.

Two groups conducted the executions: Guillaume Lamberty and his men, and the Marat Company of Revolutionary Guards, known as the 'American Hussars' (French: hussards américains) due to the presence of former Black slaves and settlers from Saint-Domingue in its ranks.

=== Bouffay drownings ===
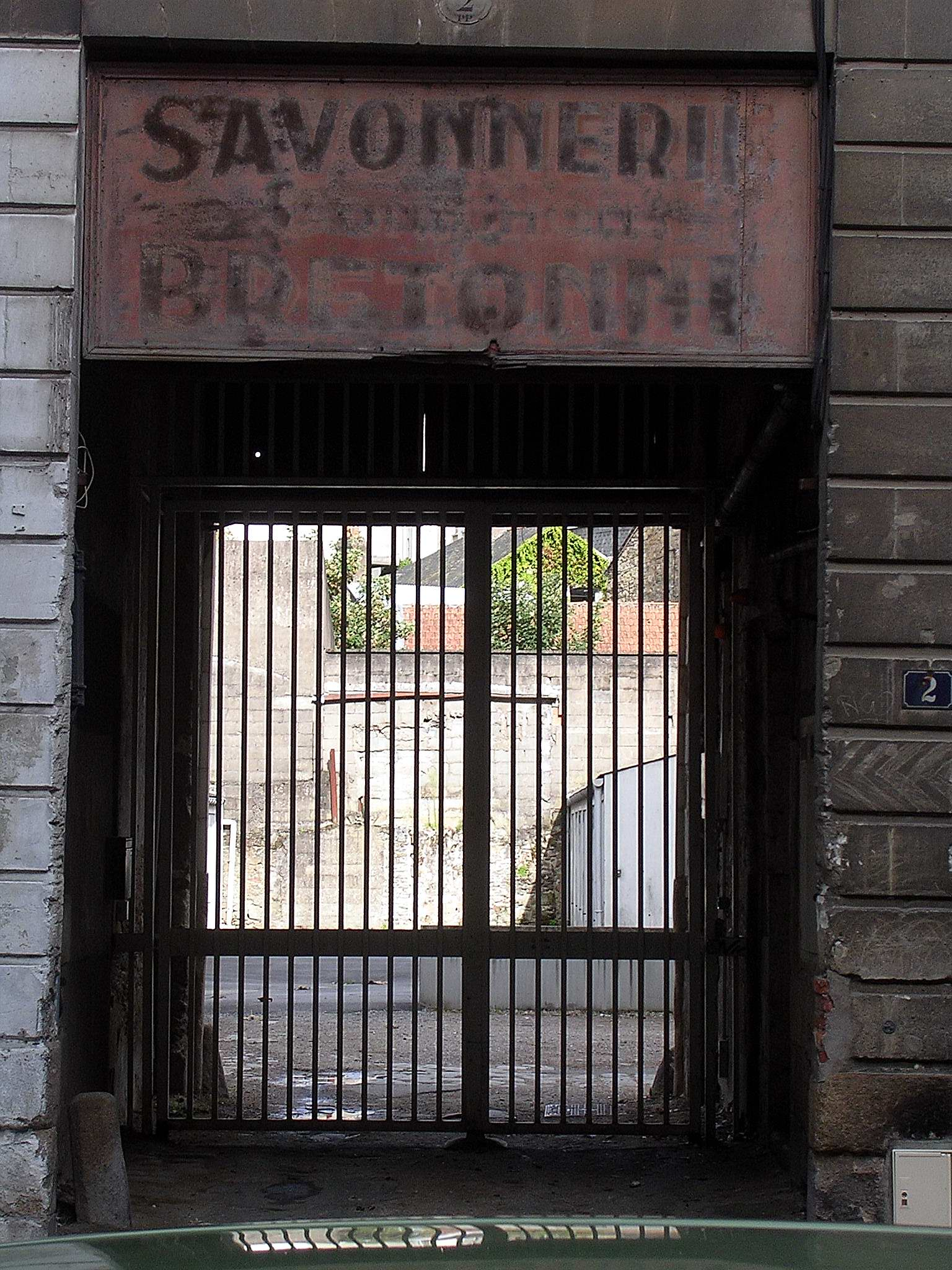
A fading 19th-century soap factory sign above the gate of the former 18th-century Coffee Warehouse jail in Nantes

The third bout of drowning, which became known as the Bouffay Drownings, took place on the nights of 14 & 15 December 1793 (24 & 25 Frimaire, Year II). Led by Jean-Jacques Goullin and Michel Moreau-Grandmaison, the Marat Company, mostly drunk, went to Bouffay Prison. Unable or unwilling to consult their lists, the soldiers grabbed prisoners at random, stripped them of their belongings and money, before tying them in pairs to heavy rocks. Once loaded onto a flat boat, the guards sailed 129 prisoners a short distance downstream from Nantes to Trentemoult, a fishing village near the island of Cheviré, and drowned them.

=== Fourth drownings ===
The drownings of 23 December 1793 (3 Nivôse, Year II) were recorded by three different accounts, with the accuracy of at least two stories verified and confirmed. This time, Pierre Robin, Fouquet, and their accomplices forced approximately eight hundred captured "royalist sympathizers" of all ages and sexes onto two boats, which only sailed as far as Chantenay and drowned them.

Among the cruellest drownings were those termed "republican marriages". Though disputed, examples in unverified accounts tell of people, like a priest and nun, being stripped naked and tied together before being drowned. They were also called "republican baptisms".

=== Galiot drownings ===
The next executions, from 29 December 1793 (9 Nivôse, Year II) to 18 January 1794 (29 Nivôse, Year II), were known as the Galiot Drownings (French: Noyades des galiotes). Two-masted Dutch galiots – small trade ships – moored in Nantes as a result of a naval blockade, were moved on this occasion to the quay next to the Coffee Warehouse jail where the condemned could easily board. Whether the galiots made two, three, or more drowning "expeditions" is unknown, however, the lives of two hundred to three hundred victims – men, women and children – were lost on each sailing. At least one boat was intentionally sunk in the Loire loaded with victims in the hold and the hatches sealed.

Records indicate that the last drownings using these Dutch vessels were organized by Carrier himself, who completely emptied out the Coffee Warehouse jail of all prisoners. These executions were perpetrated on the nights of 29 & 30 January 1794 (10 & 11 Pluviôse, Year II) and involved about four hundred people.

=== Bourgneuf Bay drownings ===
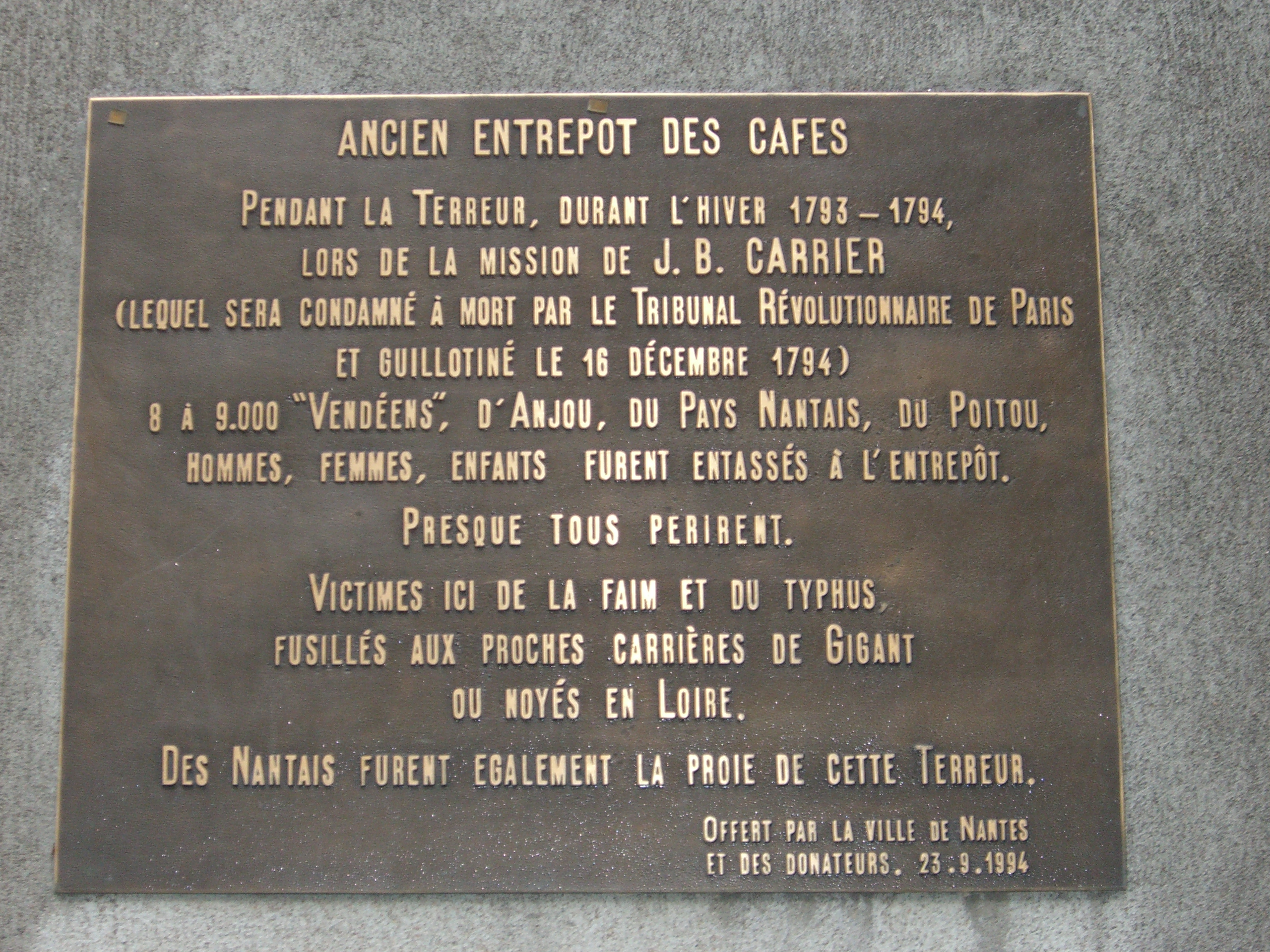
Translation of a historical marker: "Former Coffee Warehouse Jail. During the Terror in the winter of 1793–1794, at the time of the mission of J.-B. Carrier (who was condemned to death by the Revolutionary Tribunal in Paris and guillotined on 16 December 1794), 8 to 9,000 citizens of the Vendée, Anjou, the Nantes region, and Poitou – men, women, and children – were incarcerated at this jail. Nearly all perished. Victims of starvation and typhus, shot near Gigant quarry or drowned in the Loire. – The people of Nantes were equal prey to the Terror."

The final mass drownings took place on 27 February 1794 (9 Ventôse, Year II). According to official documents read to the National Convention in Paris on 12 October 1794 (21 Vendémiaire, Year III), these drownings were ordered by Adjutant General Lefèbvre resulting in 41 deaths: one 78-year-old blind man and another man, 12 women, 12 girls, and 15 children, including 10 who were only 6 to 10 years old and 5 infants. This execution took place in Bourgneuf Bay.

== Victims ==
The precise number of victims is not known. According to Roger Dupuy, there were between 7 and 11 drowning executions, with 300 to 400 victims each time. According to Jacques Hussenet, 1,800 to 4,800 people drowned on the orders of Carrier, and perhaps 2,000 others drowned on the orders by other Republican revolutionaries in Nantes. Jean-Clément Martin wrote that between 1,800 and 4,000 people died in mass drownings. In 1879, Alfred Lallie reported that 4,860 people were drowned confirmed by Hippolyte Taine. According to Reynald Secher, 4,800 victims suffered execution by drowning just during the autumn of 1793. For Gaston Martin, about 1,800 died, for Fouquet 9,000 died, for Mellinet 3,500 were killed.

According to historian Reynald Secher, these murders are one component of a systematic policy of extermination of the residents of the Vendée planned by the revolutionary Committee of Public Safety, and approved by a vote of the National Convention in Paris on 1 October 1793.

== Trial of Jean-Baptiste Carrier ==
Although most of the crimes committed by Jean-Baptiste Carrier are his direction of the mass drownings at Nantes, he also was responsible for the execution by firing squad of 1,800 to 2,600 victims at a quarry in Gigant, near Nantes, and he collaborated on other criminal and repressive acts that he justified by the Law of Suspects. His extreme paranoia was no more apparent than in the Affair of 132 Nantes Moderates (French: Affaire des 132 modérés nantais), a "tragicomedy of justice" that involved the round-up of more than 132 men from all walks of life vaguely accused of politically moderate 'federalism', who were imprisoned, tried in Paris, and subsequently acquitted of all charges.

Carrier was recalled to Paris in early 1794 to participate in the trial of Robespierre. At first, the Thermidorians left Carrier in peace, but members of the Revolutionary Committee of Nantes soon covered him with insults and accusations. Based on overwhelming evidence, he was arrested in Paris on 3 September 1794 and indicted on 27 November. At his trial, he clumsily and sarcastically stated that he knew nothing about what he was accused of. However, he was immediately denounced by those closest to him and charged with the drownings, executions, butchering of women and children, thefts, and acts of greed, as well as exacerbating the strife that Nantes suffered. A unanimous vote called for Carrier's execution, and he was guillotined on 16 December 1794.

== See also ==
- Drowning § Capital punishment
- Republican marriage
- Dechristianisation of France during the French Revolution
- War in the Vendée
- 1961 Paris massacre, wherein police massacred protesters partly through mass drownings
