= Nivôse =

4th month in the French Republican calendar

Nivôse (French pronunciation: [nivoz]; also Nivose) was the fourth month in the French Republican Calendar. The month was named after the Latin word nivosus 'snowy'.

Nivôse was the first month of the winter quarter (mois d'hiver). It started between 21 and 23 December. It ended between 19 and 21 January. It follows Frimaire and precedes Pluviôse.

The new names for the calendar were suggested by Fabre d'Églantine on 24 October 1793. On 24 November the National Convention accepted the names with minor changes. Because it was decided to omit the circumflex (accent circonflexe) in the names of the winter months, Nivose replaced Nivôse. Historiography still prefers the spelling Nivôse.

Year: 3
Month: Nivôse
Year: III

Day of the 10-day
week (décade)
Primidi
Duodi
Tridi
Quartidi
Quintidi
Sextidi
Septidi
Octidi
Nonidi
Décadi

décade 10
1	Sunday; 21 December 1794
2	Monday; 22 December 1794
3	Tuesday; 23 December 1794
4	Wednesday; 24 December 1794
5	Thursday; 25 December 1794
6	Friday; 26 December 1794
7	Saturday; 27 December 1794
8	Sunday; 28 December 1794
9	Monday; 29 December 1794
10	Tuesday; 30 December 1794

décade 11
11	Wednesday; 31 December 1794
12	Thursday; 1 January 1795
13	Friday; 2 January 1795
14	Saturday; 3 January 1795
15	Sunday; 4 January 1795
16	Monday; 5 January 1795
17	Tuesday; 6 January 1795
18	Wednesday; 7 January 1795
19	Thursday; 8 January 1795
20	Friday; 9 January 1795

décade 12
21	Saturday; 10 January 1795
22	Sunday; 11 January 1795
23	Monday; 12 January 1795
24	Tuesday; 13 January 1795
25	Wednesday; 14 January 1795
26	Thursday; 15 January 1795
27	Friday; 16 January 1795
28	Saturday; 17 January 1795
29	Sunday; 18 January 1795
30	Monday; 19 January 1795

Decimal time – 10 h/day
Paris
5h04m03s

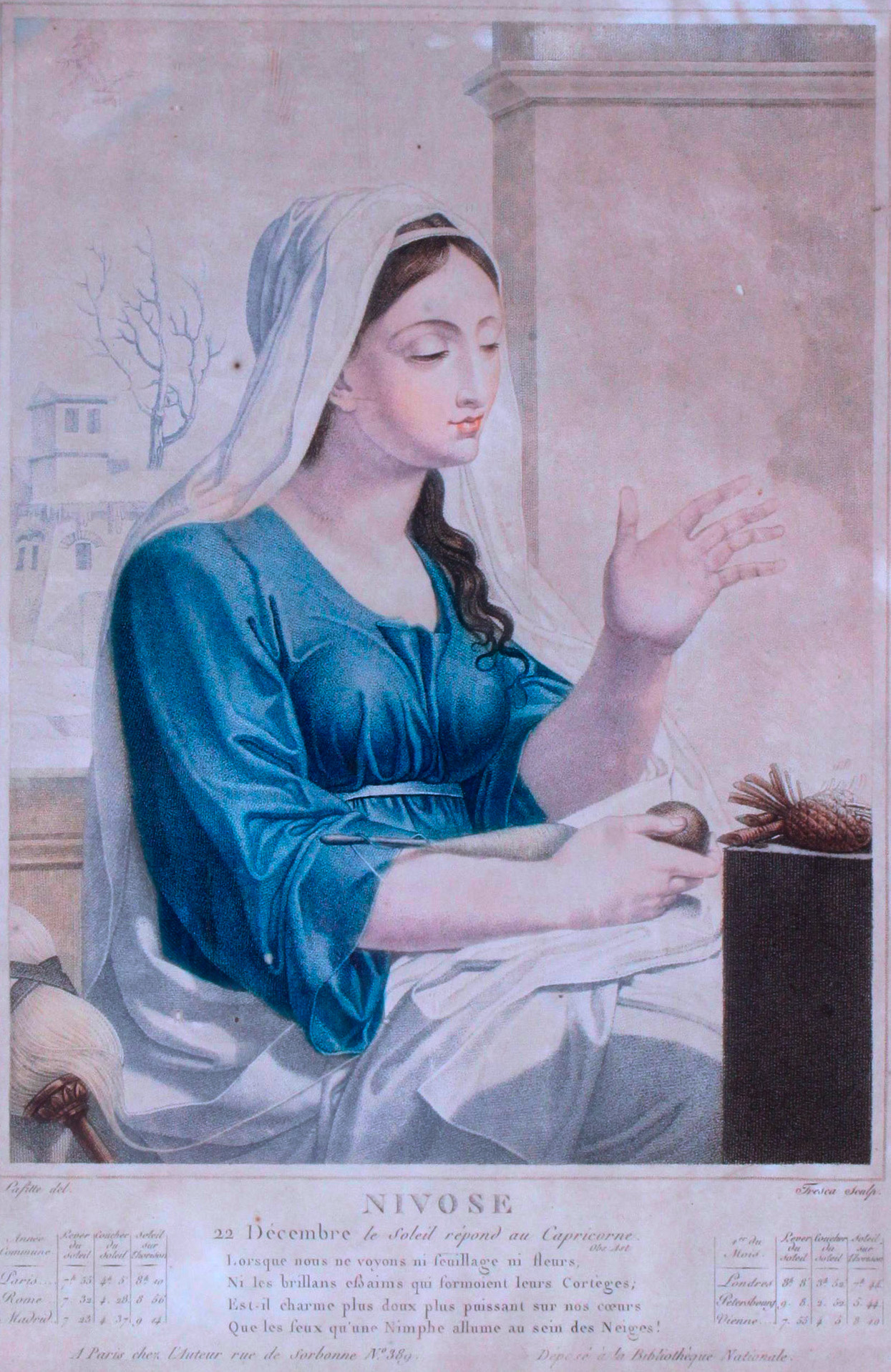
Nivôse

11:56:28
Time of day - 24 h/day
Greenwich

Conversion between Republican and Gregorian calendar for the years I - XIV

Year: 1
Month: Nivôse
Year: I

Day of the 10-day
week (décade)
Primidi
Duodi
Tridi
Quartidi
Quintidi
Sextidi
Septidi
Octidi
Nonidi
Décadi

décade 10
1	Friday; 21 December 1792
2	Saturday; 22 December 1792
3	Sunday; 23 December 1792
4	Monday; 24 December 1792
5	Tuesday; 25 December 1792
6	Wednesday; 26 December 1792
7	Thursday; 27 December 1792
8	Friday; 28 December 1792
9	Saturday; 29 December 1792
10	Sunday; 30 December 1792

décade 11
11	Monday; 31 December 1792
12	Tuesday; 1 January 1793
13	Wednesday; 2 January 1793
14	Thursday; 3 January 1793
15	Friday; 4 January 1793
16	Saturday; 5 January 1793
17	Sunday; 6 January 1793
18	Monday; 7 January 1793
19	Tuesday; 8 January 1793
20	Wednesday; 9 January 1793

décade 12
21	Thursday; 10 January 1793
22	Friday; 11 January 1793
23	Saturday; 12 January 1793
24	Sunday; 13 January 1793
25	Monday; 14 January 1793
26	Tuesday; 15 January 1793
27	Wednesday; 16 January 1793
28	Thursday; 17 January 1793
29	Friday; 18 January 1793
30	Saturday; 19 January 1793

Decimal time – 10 h/day
Paris
4:97:54

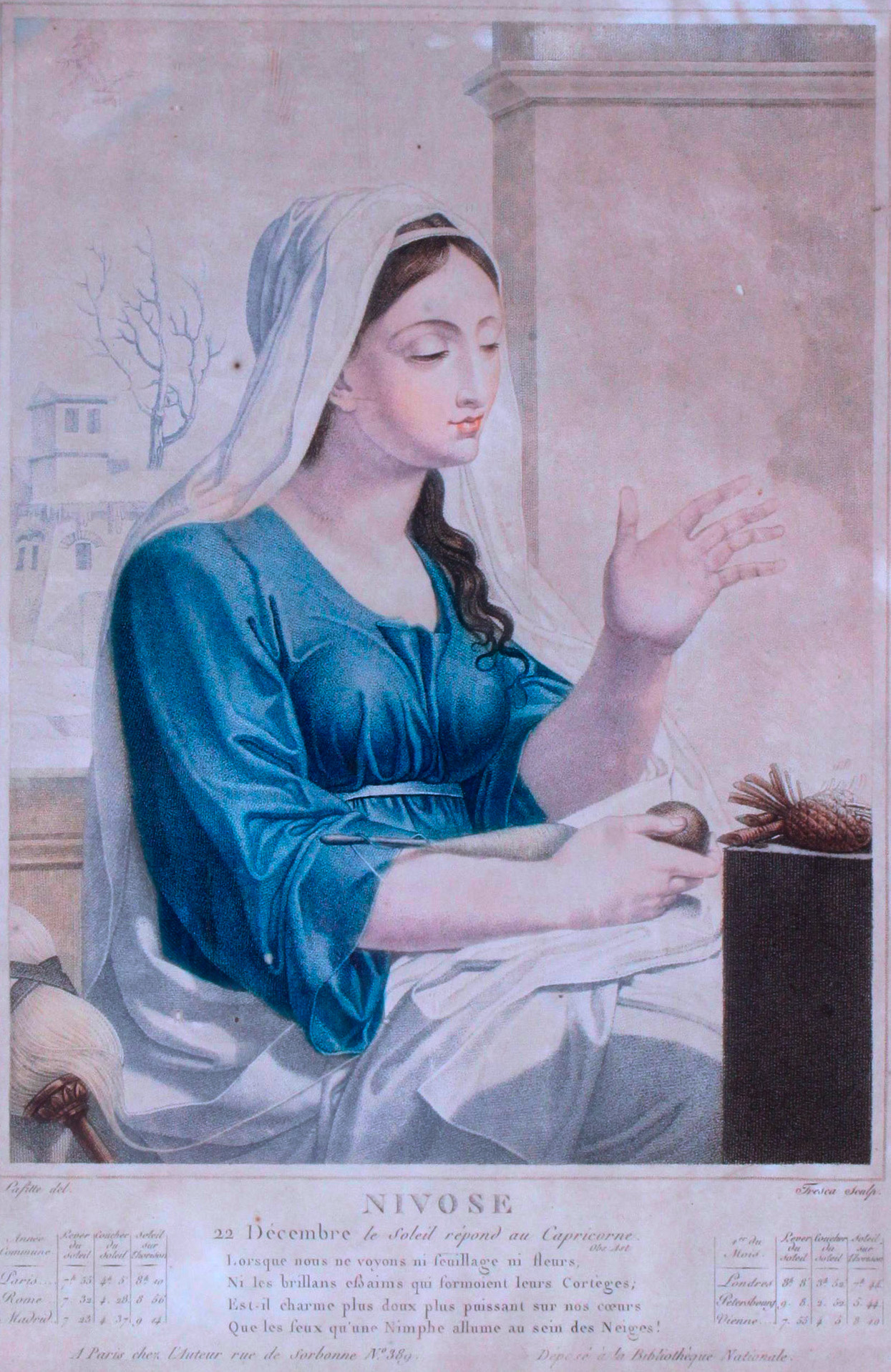
Nivôse

11:56:28
Time of day - 24 h/day
Greenwich

Year: 2
Month: Nivôse
Year: II

Day of the 10-day
week (décade)
Primidi
Duodi
Tridi
Quartidi
Quintidi
Sextidi
Septidi
Octidi
Nonidi
Décadi

décade 10
1	Saturday; 21 December 1793
2	Sunday; 22 December 1793
3	Monday; 23 December 1793
4	Tuesday; 24 December 1793
5	Wednesday; 25 December 1793
6	Thursday; 26 December 1793
7	Friday; 27 December 1793
8	Saturday; 28 December 1793
9	Sunday; 29 December 1793
10	Monday; 30 December 1793

décade 11
11	Tuesday; 31 December 1793
12	Wednesday; 1 January 1794
13	Thursday; 2 January 1794
14	Friday; 3 January 1794
15	Saturday; 4 January 1794
16	Sunday; 5 January 1794
17	Monday; 6 January 1794
18	Tuesday; 7 January 1794
19	Wednesday; 8 January 1794
20	Thursday; 9 January 1794

décade 12
21	Friday; 10 January 1794
22	Saturday; 11 January 1794
23	Sunday; 12 January 1794
24	Monday; 13 January 1794
25	Tuesday; 14 January 1794
26	Wednesday; 15 January 1794
27	Thursday; 16 January 1794
28	Friday; 17 January 1794
29	Saturday; 18 January 1794
30	Sunday; 19 January 1794

Decimal time – 10 h/day
Paris
4:97:54

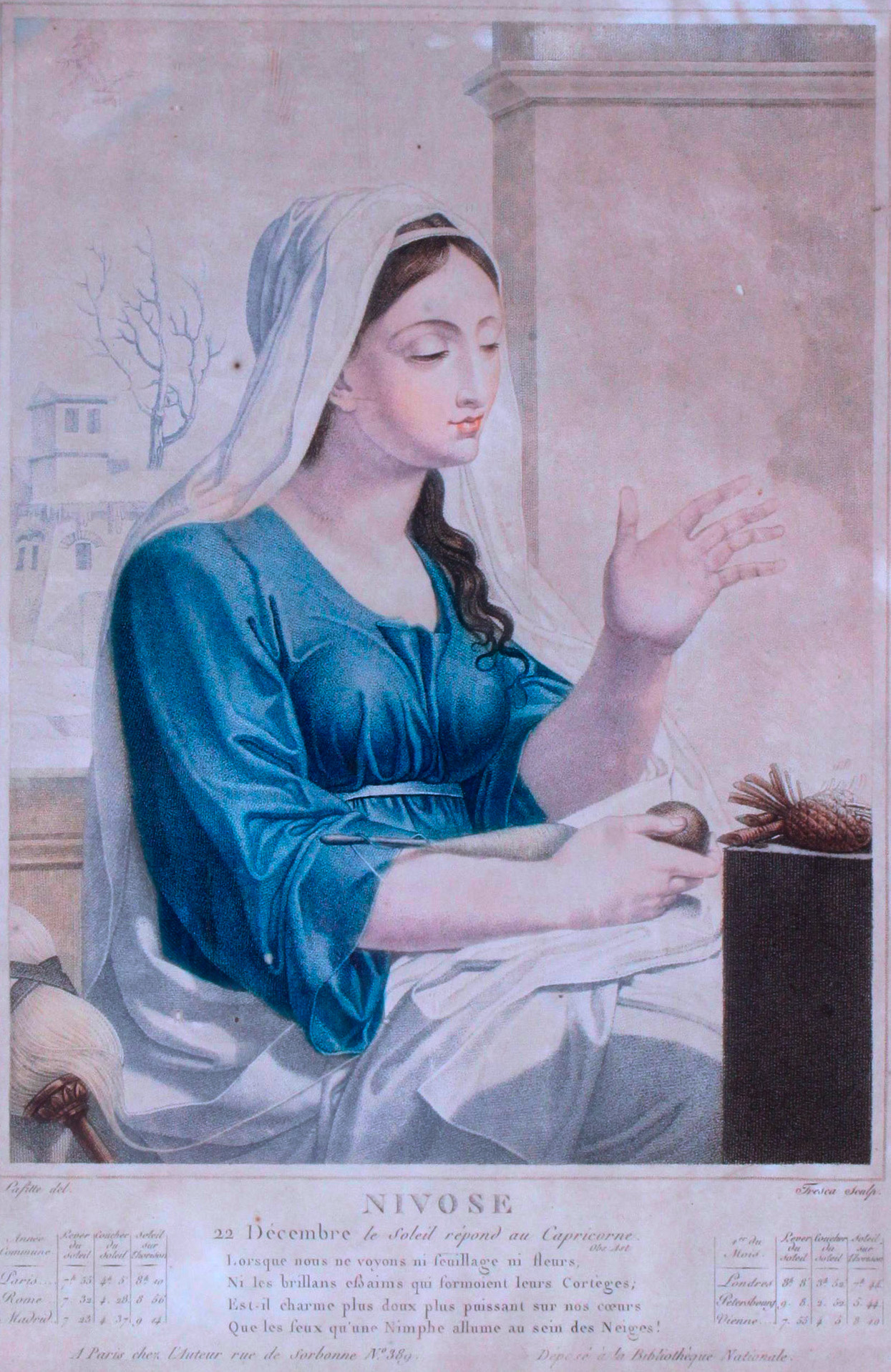
Nivôse

11:56:28
Time of day - 24 h/day
Greenwich

Year: 3
Month: Nivôse
Year: III

Day of the 10-day
week (décade)
Primidi
Duodi
Tridi
Quartidi
Quintidi
Sextidi
Septidi
Octidi
Nonidi
Décadi

décade 10
1	Sunday; 21 December 1794
2	Monday; 22 December 1794
3	Tuesday; 23 December 1794
4	Wednesday; 24 December 1794
5	Thursday; 25 December 1794
6	Friday; 26 December 1794
7	Saturday; 27 December 1794
8	Sunday; 28 December 1794
9	Monday; 29 December 1794
10	Tuesday; 30 December 1794

décade 11
11	Wednesday; 31 December 1794
12	Thursday; 1 January 1795
13	Friday; 2 January 1795
14	Saturday; 3 January 1795
15	Sunday; 4 January 1795
16	Monday; 5 January 1795
17	Tuesday; 6 January 1795
18	Wednesday; 7 January 1795
19	Thursday; 8 January 1795
20	Friday; 9 January 1795

décade 12
21	Saturday; 10 January 1795
22	Sunday; 11 January 1795
23	Monday; 12 January 1795
24	Tuesday; 13 January 1795
25	Wednesday; 14 January 1795
26	Thursday; 15 January 1795
27	Friday; 16 January 1795
28	Saturday; 17 January 1795
29	Sunday; 18 January 1795
30	Monday; 19 January 1795

Decimal time – 10 h/day
Paris
4:97:54

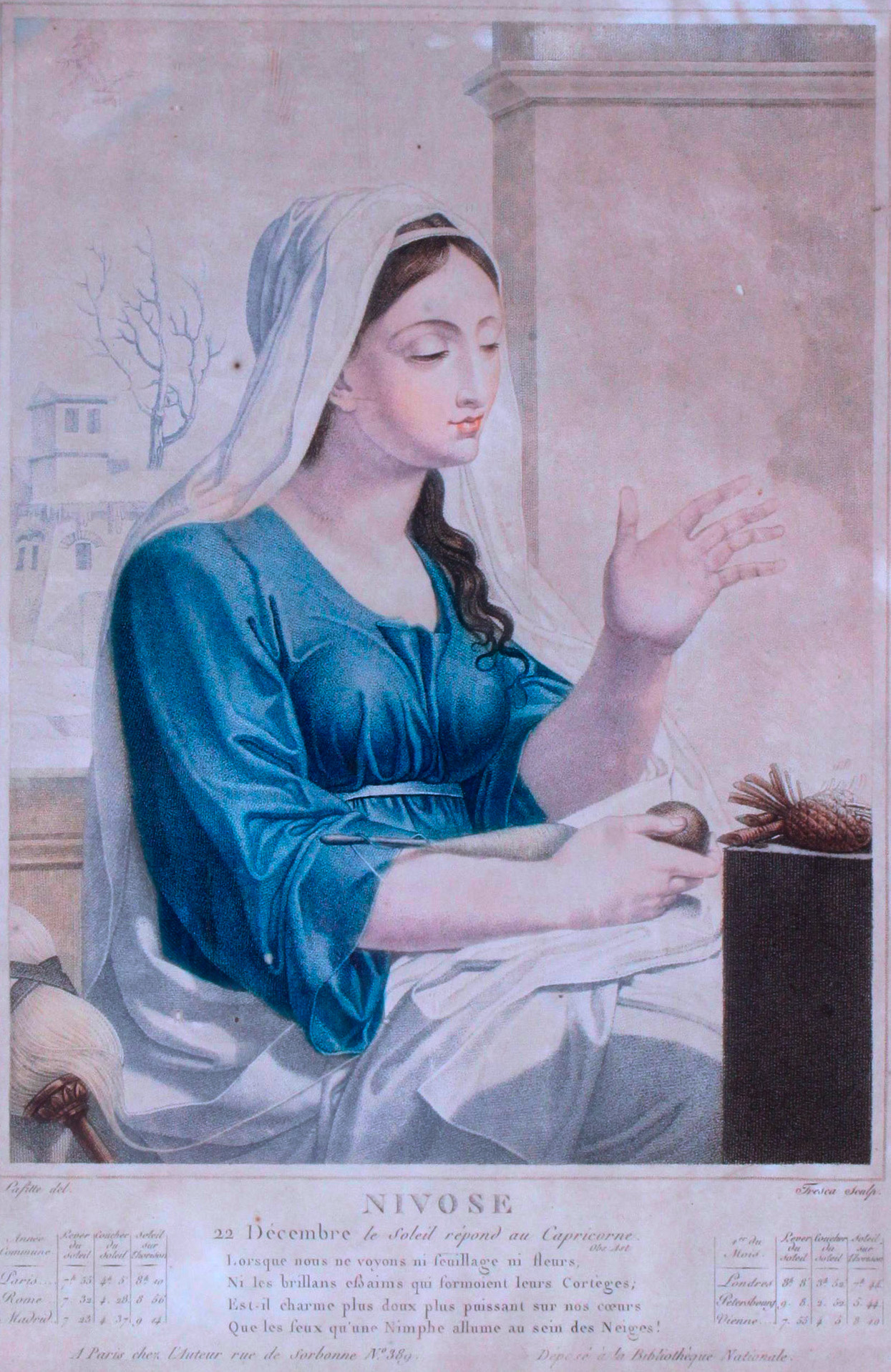
Nivôse

11:56:28
Time of day - 24 h/day
Greenwich

Year: 4
Month: Nivôse
Year: IV

Day of the 10-day
week (décade)
Primidi
Duodi
Tridi
Quartidi
Quintidi
Sextidi
Septidi
Octidi
Nonidi
Décadi

décade 10
1	Tuesday; 22 December 1795
2	Wednesday; 23 December 1795
3	Thursday; 24 December 1795
4	Friday; 25 December 1795
5	Saturday; 26 December 1795
6	Sunday; 27 December 1795
7	Monday; 28 December 1795
8	Tuesday; 29 December 1795
9	Wednesday; 30 December 1795
10	Thursday; 31 December 1795

décade 11
11	Friday; 1 January 1796
12	Saturday; 2 January 1796
13	Sunday; 3 January 1796
14	Monday; 4 January 1796
15	Tuesday; 5 January 1796
16	Wednesday; 6 January 1796
17	Thursday; 7 January 1796
18	Friday; 8 January 1796
19	Saturday; 9 January 1796
20	Sunday; 10 January 1796

décade 12
21	Monday; 11 January 1796
22	Tuesday; 12 January 1796
23	Wednesday; 13 January 1796
24	Thursday; 14 January 1796
25	Friday; 15 January 1796
26	Saturday; 16 January 1796
27	Sunday; 17 January 1796
28	Monday; 18 January 1796
29	Tuesday; 19 January 1796
30	Wednesday; 20 January 1796

Decimal time – 10 h/day
Paris
4:97:54

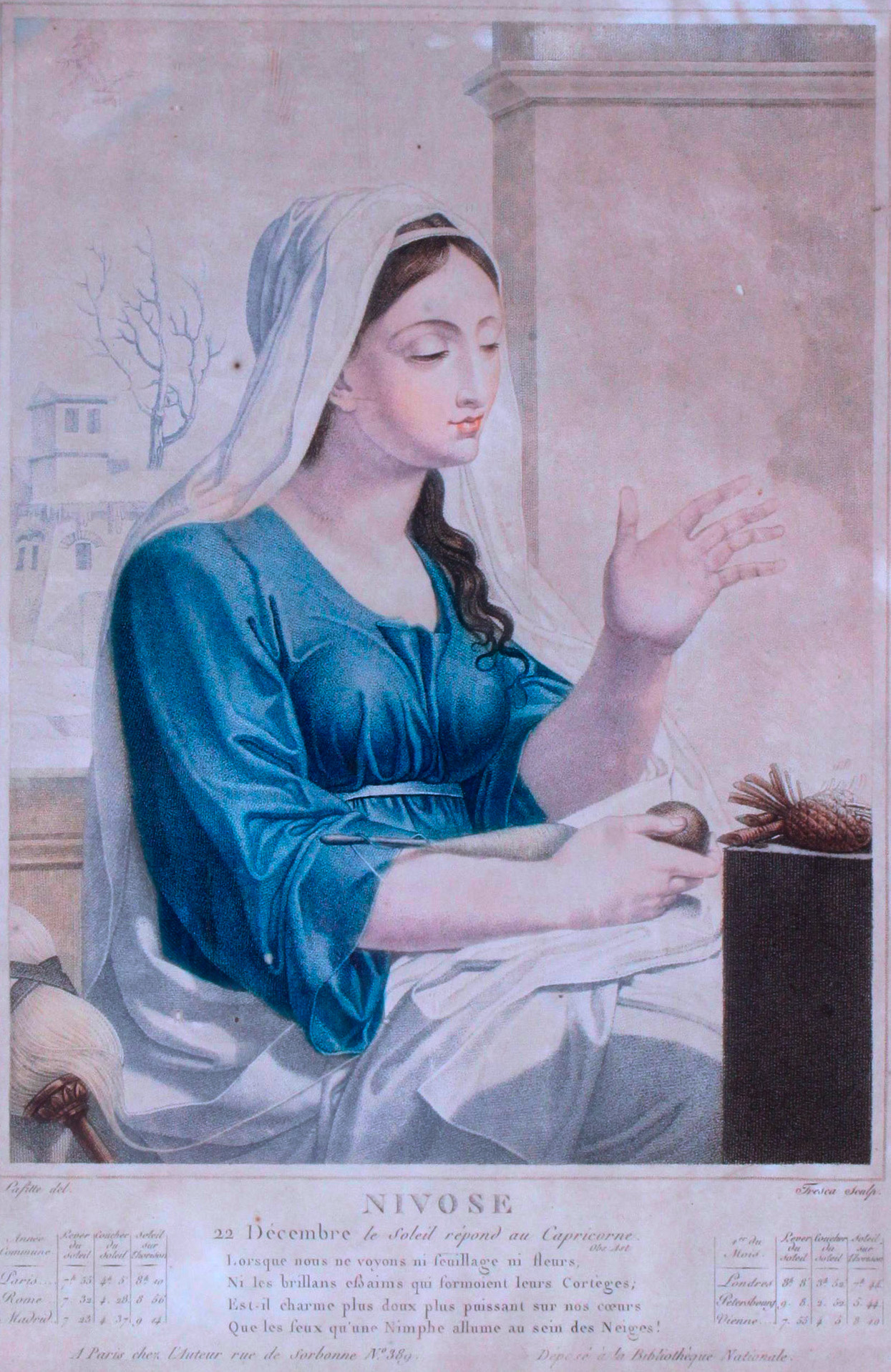
Nivôse

11:56:28
Time of day - 24 h/day
Greenwich

Year: 5
Month: Nivôse
Year: V

Day of the 10-day
week (décade)
Primidi
Duodi
Tridi
Quartidi
Quintidi
Sextidi
Septidi
Octidi
Nonidi
Décadi

décade 10
1	Wednesday; 21 December 1796
2	Thursday; 22 December 1796
3	Friday; 23 December 1796
4	Saturday; 24 December 1796
5	Sunday; 25 December 1796
6	Monday; 26 December 1796
7	Tuesday; 27 December 1796
8	Wednesday; 28 December 1796
9	Thursday; 29 December 1796
10	Friday; 30 December 1796

décade 11
11	Saturday; 31 December 1796
12	Sunday; 1 January 1797
13	Monday; 2 January 1797
14	Tuesday; 3 January 1797
15	Wednesday; 4 January 1797
16	Thursday; 5 January 1797
17	Friday; 6 January 1797
18	Saturday; 7 January 1797
19	Sunday; 8 January 1797
20	Monday; 9 January 1797

décade 12
21	Tuesday; 10 January 1797
22	Wednesday; 11 January 1797
23	Thursday; 12 January 1797
24	Friday; 13 January 1797
25	Saturday; 14 January 1797
26	Sunday; 15 January 1797
27	Monday; 16 January 1797
28	Tuesday; 17 January 1797
29	Wednesday; 18 January 1797
30	Thursday; 19 January 1797

Decimal time – 10 h/day
Paris
4:97:54

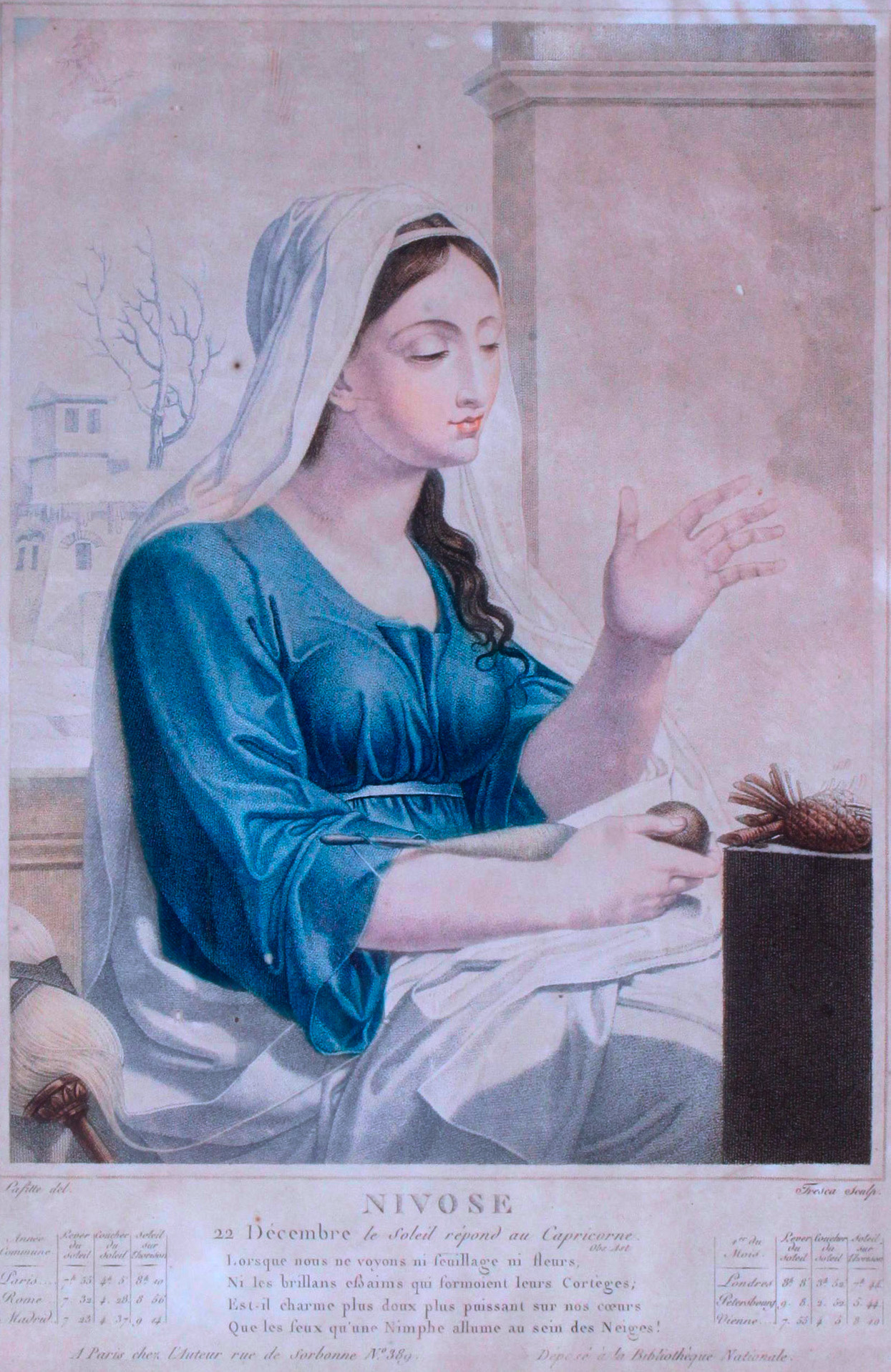
Nivôse

11:56:28
Time of day - 24 h/day
Greenwich

Year: 6
Month: Nivôse
Year: VI

Day of the 10-day
week (décade)
Primidi
Duodi
Tridi
Quartidi
Quintidi
Sextidi
Septidi
Octidi
Nonidi
Décadi

décade 10
1	Thursday; 21 December 1797
2	Friday; 22 December 1797
3	Saturday; 23 December 1797
4	Sunday; 24 December 1797
5	Monday; 25 December 1797
6	Tuesday; 26 December 1797
7	Wednesday; 27 December 1797
8	Thursday; 28 December 1797
9	Friday; 29 December 1797
10	Saturday; 30 December 1797

décade 11
11	Sunday; 31 December 1797
12	Monday; 1 January 1798
13	Tuesday; 2 January 1798
14	Wednesday; 3 January 1798
15	Thursday; 4 January 1798
16	Friday; 5 January 1798
17	Saturday; 6 January 1798
18	Sunday; 7 January 1798
19	Monday; 8 January 1798
20	Tuesday; 9 January 1798

décade 12
21	Wednesday; 10 January 1798
22	Thursday; 11 January 1798
23	Friday; 12 January 1798
24	Saturday; 13 January 1798
25	Sunday; 14 January 1798
26	Monday; 15 January 1798
27	Tuesday; 16 January 1798
28	Wednesday; 17 January 1798
29	Thursday; 18 January 1798
30	Friday; 19 January 1798

Decimal time – 10 h/day
Paris
4:97:54

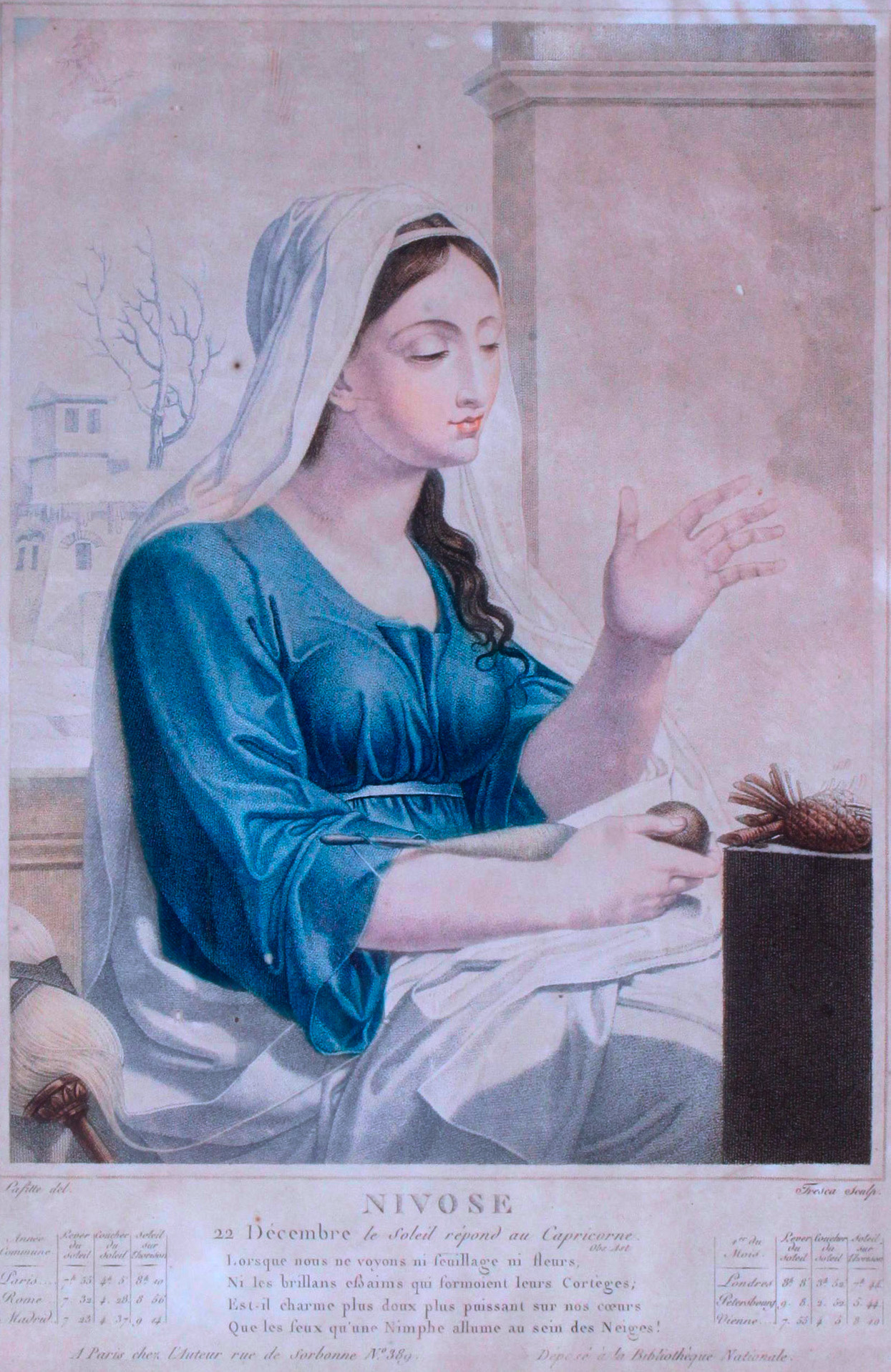
Nivôse

11:56:28
Time of day - 24 h/day
Greenwich

Year: 7
Month: Nivôse
Year: VII

Day of the 10-day
week (décade)
Primidi
Duodi
Tridi
Quartidi
Quintidi
Sextidi
Septidi
Octidi
Nonidi
Décadi

décade 10
1	Friday; 21 December 1798
2	Saturday; 22 December 1798
3	Sunday; 23 December 1798
4	Monday; 24 December 1798
5	Tuesday; 25 December 1798
6	Wednesday; 26 December 1798
7	Thursday; 27 December 1798
8	Friday; 28 December 1798
9	Saturday; 29 December 1798
10	Sunday; 30 December 1798

décade 11
11	Monday; 31 December 1798
12	Tuesday; 1 January 1799
13	Wednesday; 2 January 1799
14	Thursday; 3 January 1799
15	Friday; 4 January 1799
16	Saturday; 5 January 1799
17	Sunday; 6 January 1799
18	Monday; 7 January 1799
19	Tuesday; 8 January 1799
20	Wednesday; 9 January 1799

décade 12
21	Thursday; 10 January 1799
22	Friday; 11 January 1799
23	Saturday; 12 January 1799
24	Sunday; 13 January 1799
25	Monday; 14 January 1799
26	Tuesday; 15 January 1799
27	Wednesday; 16 January 1799
28	Thursday; 17 January 1799
29	Friday; 18 January 1799
30	Saturday; 19 January 1799

Decimal time – 10 h/day
Paris
4:97:54

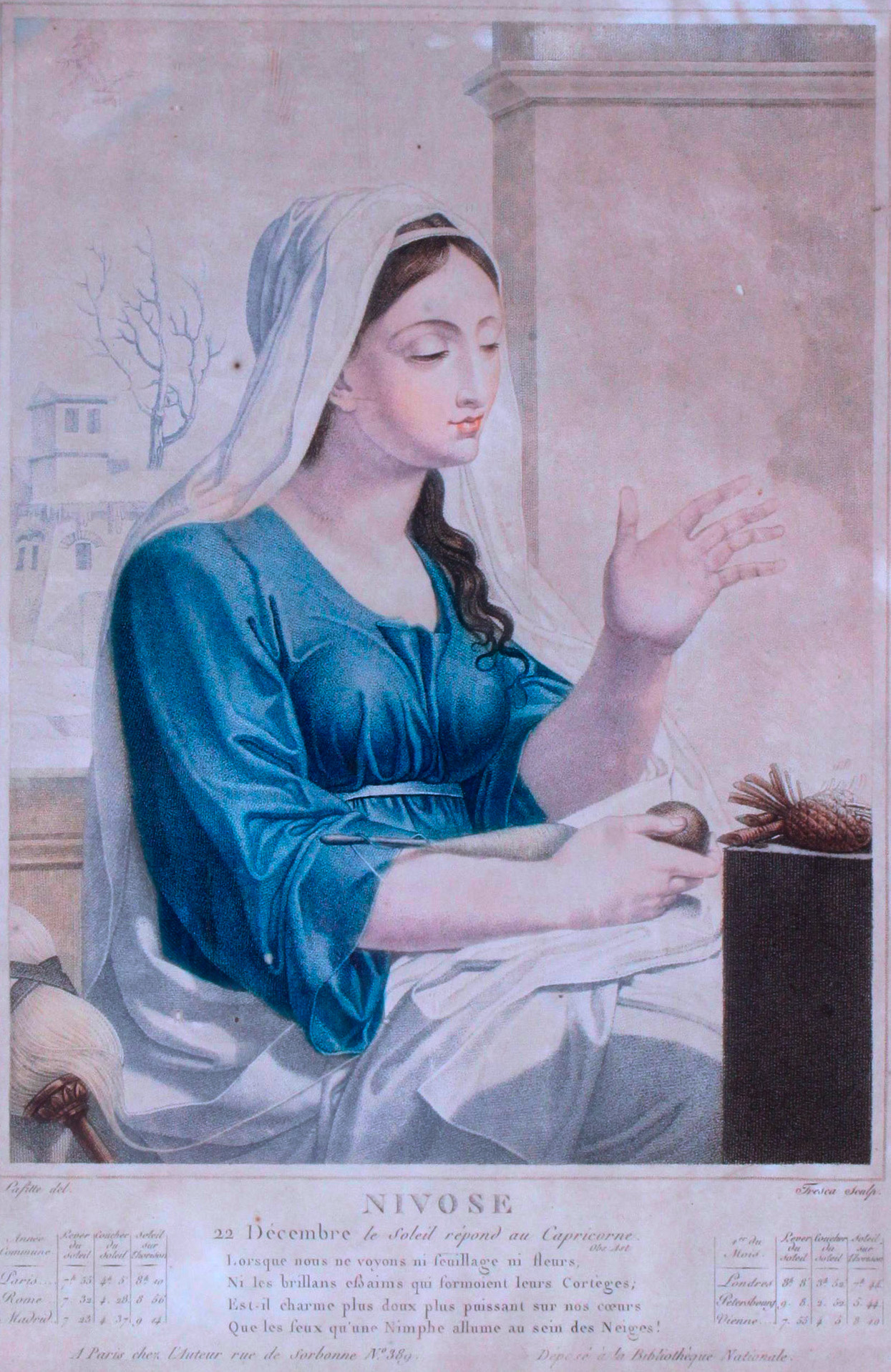
Nivôse

11:56:28
Time of day - 24 h/day
Greenwich

Year: 8
Month: Nivôse
Year: VIII

Day of the 10-day
week (décade)
Primidi
Duodi
Tridi
Quartidi
Quintidi
Sextidi
Septidi
Octidi
Nonidi
Décadi

décade 10
1	Sunday; 22 December 1799
2	Monday; 23 December 1799
3	Tuesday; 24 December 1799
4	Wednesday; 25 December 1799
5	Thursday; 26 December 1799
6	Friday; 27 December 1799
7	Saturday; 28 December 1799
8	Sunday; 29 December 1799
9	Monday; 30 December 1799
10	Tuesday; 31 December 1799

décade 11
11	Wednesday; 1 January 1800
12	Thursday; 2 January 1800
13	Friday; 3 January 1800
14	Saturday; 4 January 1800
15	Sunday; 5 January 1800
16	Monday; 6 January 1800
17	Tuesday; 7 January 1800
18	Wednesday; 8 January 1800
19	Thursday; 9 January 1800
20	Friday; 10 January 1800

décade 12
21	Saturday; 11 January 1800
22	Sunday; 12 January 1800
23	Monday; 13 January 1800
24	Tuesday; 14 January 1800
25	Wednesday; 15 January 1800
26	Thursday; 16 January 1800
27	Friday; 17 January 1800
28	Saturday; 18 January 1800
29	Sunday; 19 January 1800
30	Monday; 20 January 1800

Decimal time – 10 h/day
Paris
4:97:54

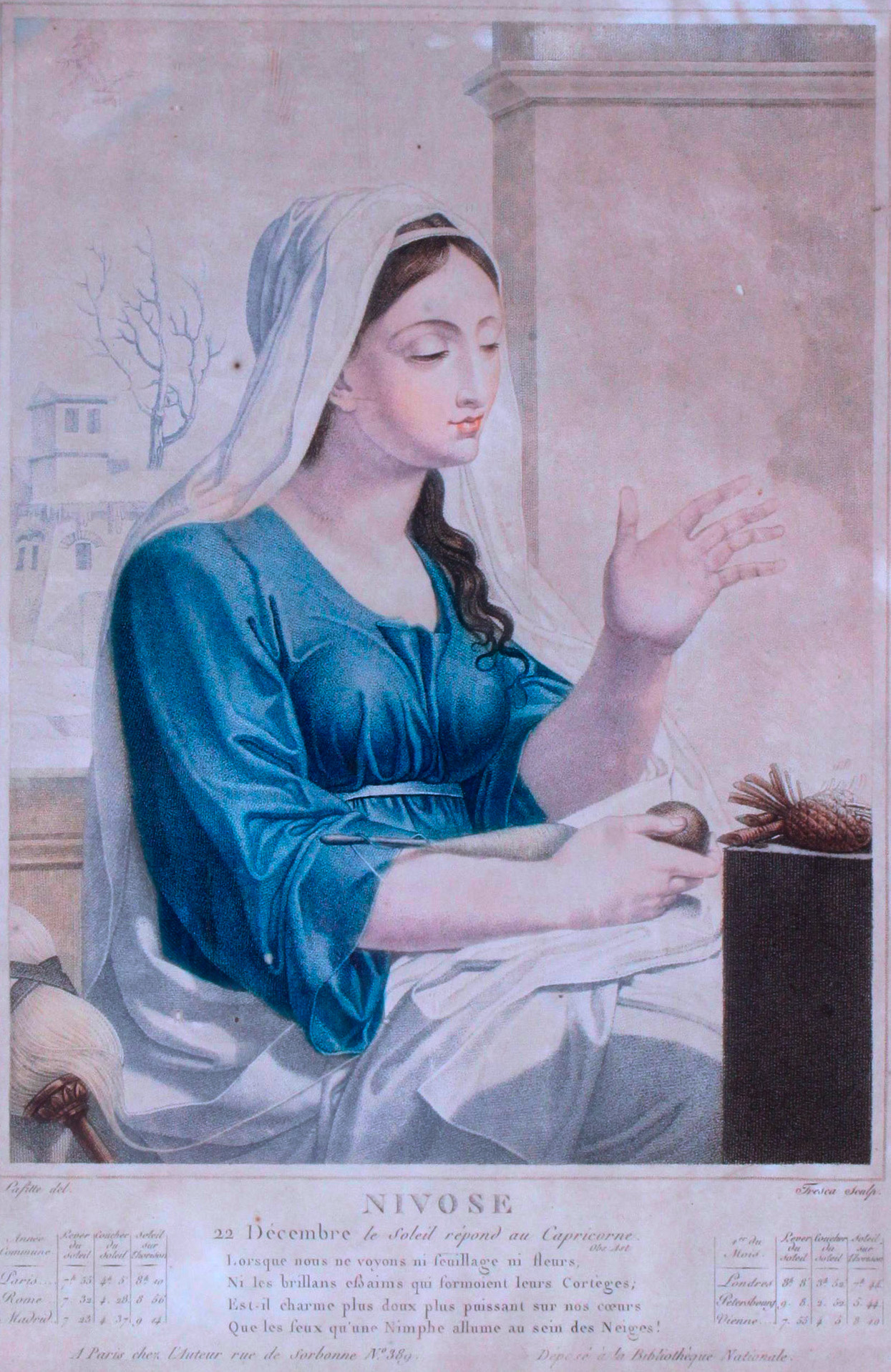
Nivôse

11:56:28
Time of day - 24 h/day
Greenwich

Year: 9
Month: Nivôse
Year: IX

Day of the 10-day
week (décade)
Primidi
Duodi
Tridi
Quartidi
Quintidi
Sextidi
Septidi
Octidi
Nonidi
Décadi

décade 10
1	Monday; 22 December 1800
2	Tuesday; 23 December 1800
3	Wednesday; 24 December 1800
4	Thursday; 25 December 1800
5	Friday; 26 December 1800
6	Saturday; 27 December 1800
7	Sunday; 28 December 1800
8	Monday; 29 December 1800
9	Tuesday; 30 December 1800
10	Wednesday; 31 December 1800

décade 11
11	Thursday; 1 January 1801
12	Friday; 2 January 1801
13	Saturday; 3 January 1801
14	Sunday; 4 January 1801
15	Monday; 5 January 1801
16	Tuesday; 6 January 1801
17	Wednesday; 7 January 1801
18	Thursday; 8 January 1801
19	Friday; 9 January 1801
20	Saturday; 10 January 1801

décade 12
21	Sunday; 11 January 1801
22	Monday; 12 January 1801
23	Tuesday; 13 January 1801
24	Wednesday; 14 January 1801
25	Thursday; 15 January 1801
26	Friday; 16 January 1801
27	Saturday; 17 January 1801
28	Sunday; 18 January 1801
29	Monday; 19 January 1801
30	Tuesday; 20 January 1801

Decimal time – 10 h/day
Paris
4:97:54

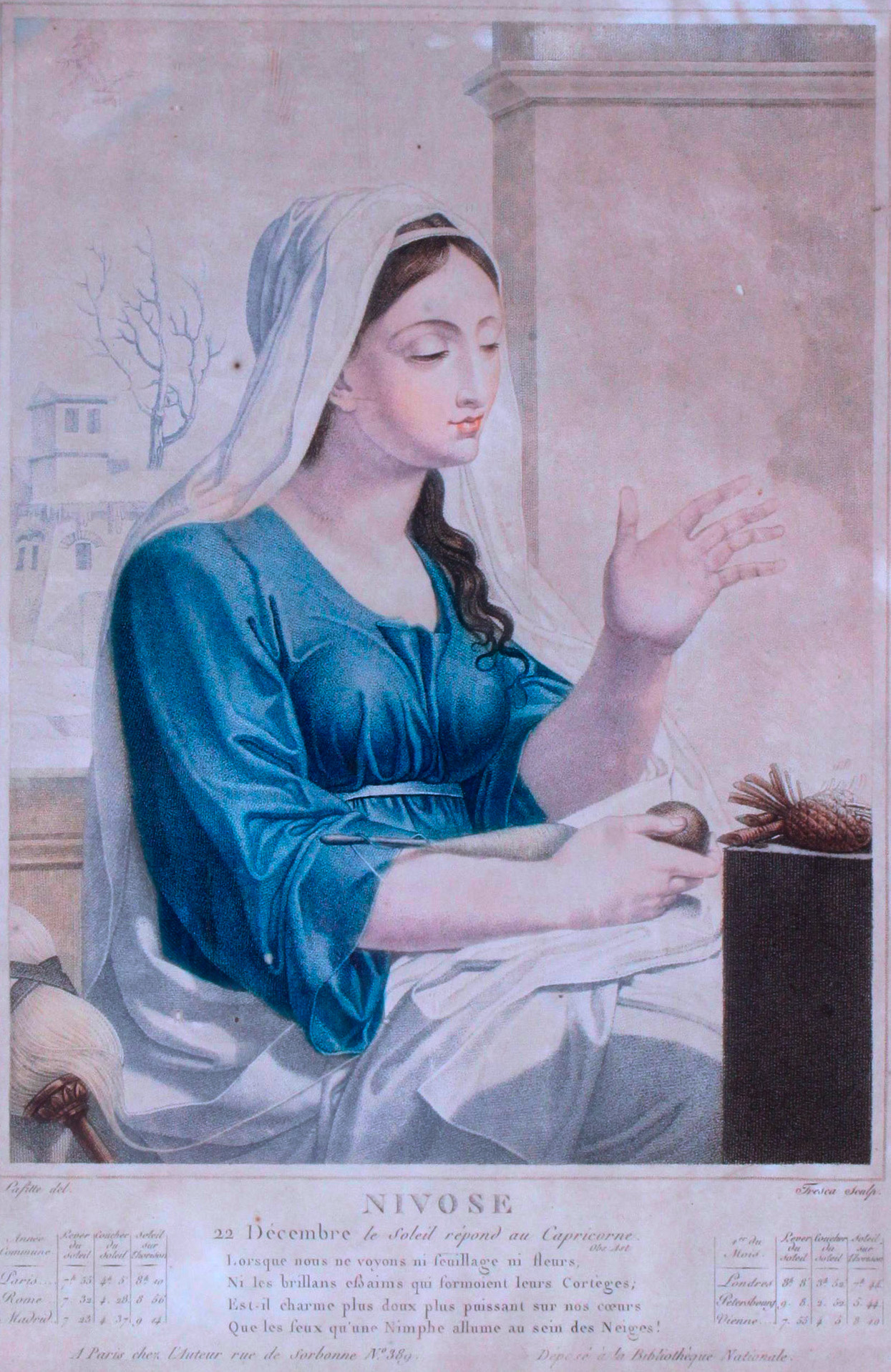
Nivôse

11:56:28
Time of day - 24 h/day
Greenwich

Year: 10
Month: Nivôse
Year: X

Day of the 10-day
week (décade)
Primidi
Duodi
Tridi
Quartidi
Quintidi
Sextidi
Septidi
Octidi
Nonidi
Décadi

décade 10
1	Tuesday; 22 December 1801
2	Wednesday; 23 December 1801
3	Thursday; 24 December 1801
4	Friday; 25 December 1801
5	Saturday; 26 December 1801
6	Sunday; 27 December 1801
7	Monday; 28 December 1801
8	Tuesday; 29 December 1801
9	Wednesday; 30 December 1801
10	Thursday; 31 December 1801

décade 11
11	Friday; 1 January 1802
12	Saturday; 2 January 1802
13	Sunday; 3 January 1802
14	Monday; 4 January 1802
15	Tuesday; 5 January 1802
16	Wednesday; 6 January 1802
17	Thursday; 7 January 1802
18	Friday; 8 January 1802
19	Saturday; 9 January 1802
20	Sunday; 10 January 1802

décade 12
21	Monday; 11 January 1802
22	Tuesday; 12 January 1802
23	Wednesday; 13 January 1802
24	Thursday; 14 January 1802
25	Friday; 15 January 1802
26	Saturday; 16 January 1802
27	Sunday; 17 January 1802
28	Monday; 18 January 1802
29	Tuesday; 19 January 1802
30	Wednesday; 20 January 1802

Decimal time – 10 h/day
Paris
4:97:54

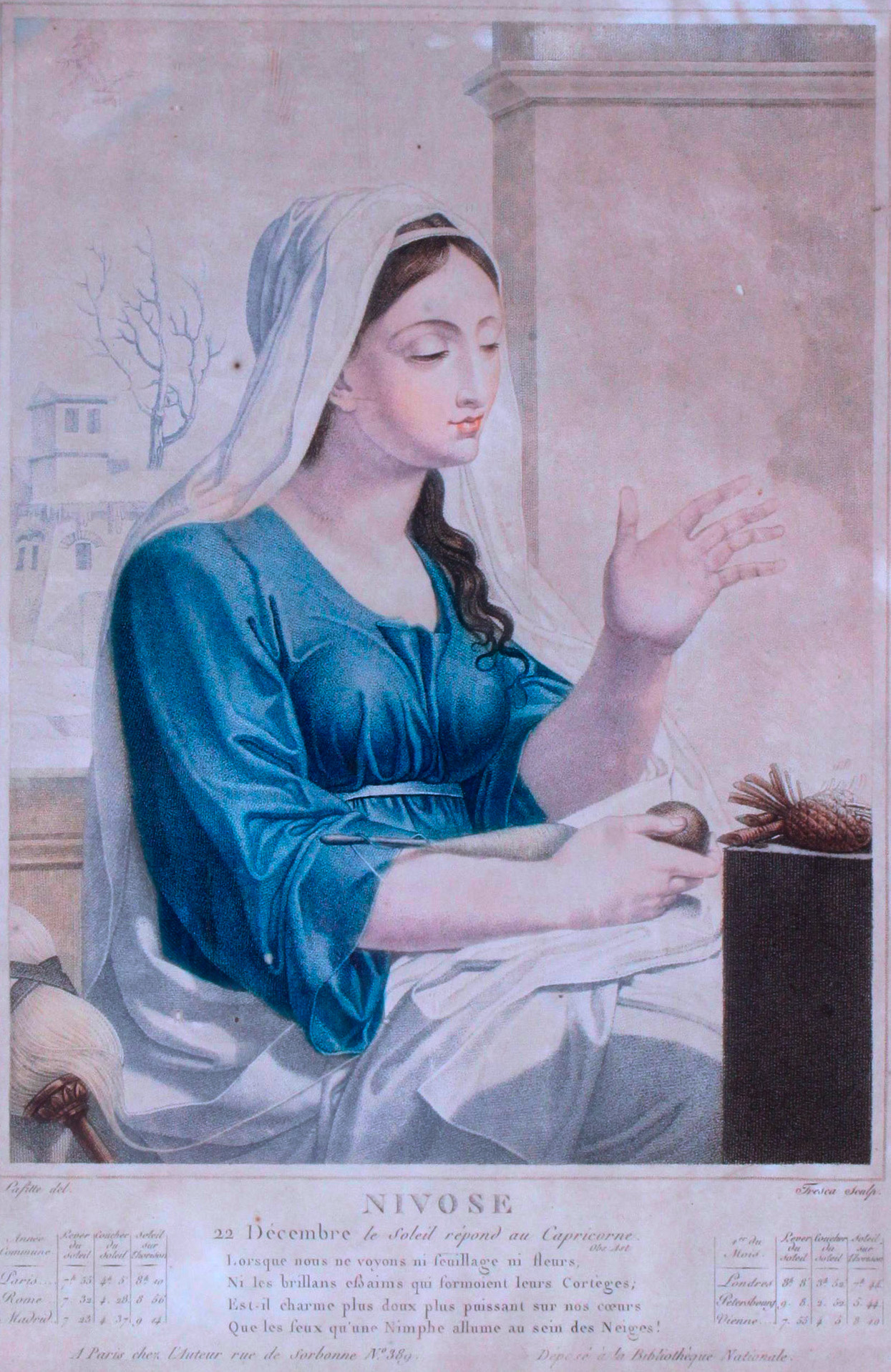
Nivôse

11:56:28
Time of day - 24 h/day
Greenwich

Year: 11
Month: Nivôse
Year: XI

Day of the 10-day
week (décade)
Primidi
Duodi
Tridi
Quartidi
Quintidi
Sextidi
Septidi
Octidi
Nonidi
Décadi

décade 10
1	Wednesday; 22 December 1802
2	Thursday; 23 December 1802
3	Friday; 24 December 1802
4	Saturday; 25 December 1802
5	Sunday; 26 December 1802
6	Monday; 27 December 1802
7	Tuesday; 28 December 1802
8	Wednesday; 29 December 1802
9	Thursday; 30 December 1802
10	Friday; 31 December 1802

décade 11
11	Saturday; 1 January 1803
12	Sunday; 2 January 1803
13	Monday; 3 January 1803
14	Tuesday; 4 January 1803
15	Wednesday; 5 January 1803
16	Thursday; 6 January 1803
17	Friday; 7 January 1803
18	Saturday; 8 January 1803
19	Sunday; 9 January 1803
20	Monday; 10 January 1803

décade 12
21	Tuesday; 11 January 1803
22	Wednesday; 12 January 1803
23	Thursday; 13 January 1803
24	Friday; 14 January 1803
25	Saturday; 15 January 1803
26	Sunday; 16 January 1803
27	Monday; 17 January 1803
28	Tuesday; 18 January 1803
29	Wednesday; 19 January 1803
30	Thursday; 20 January 1803

Decimal time – 10 h/day
Paris
4:97:54

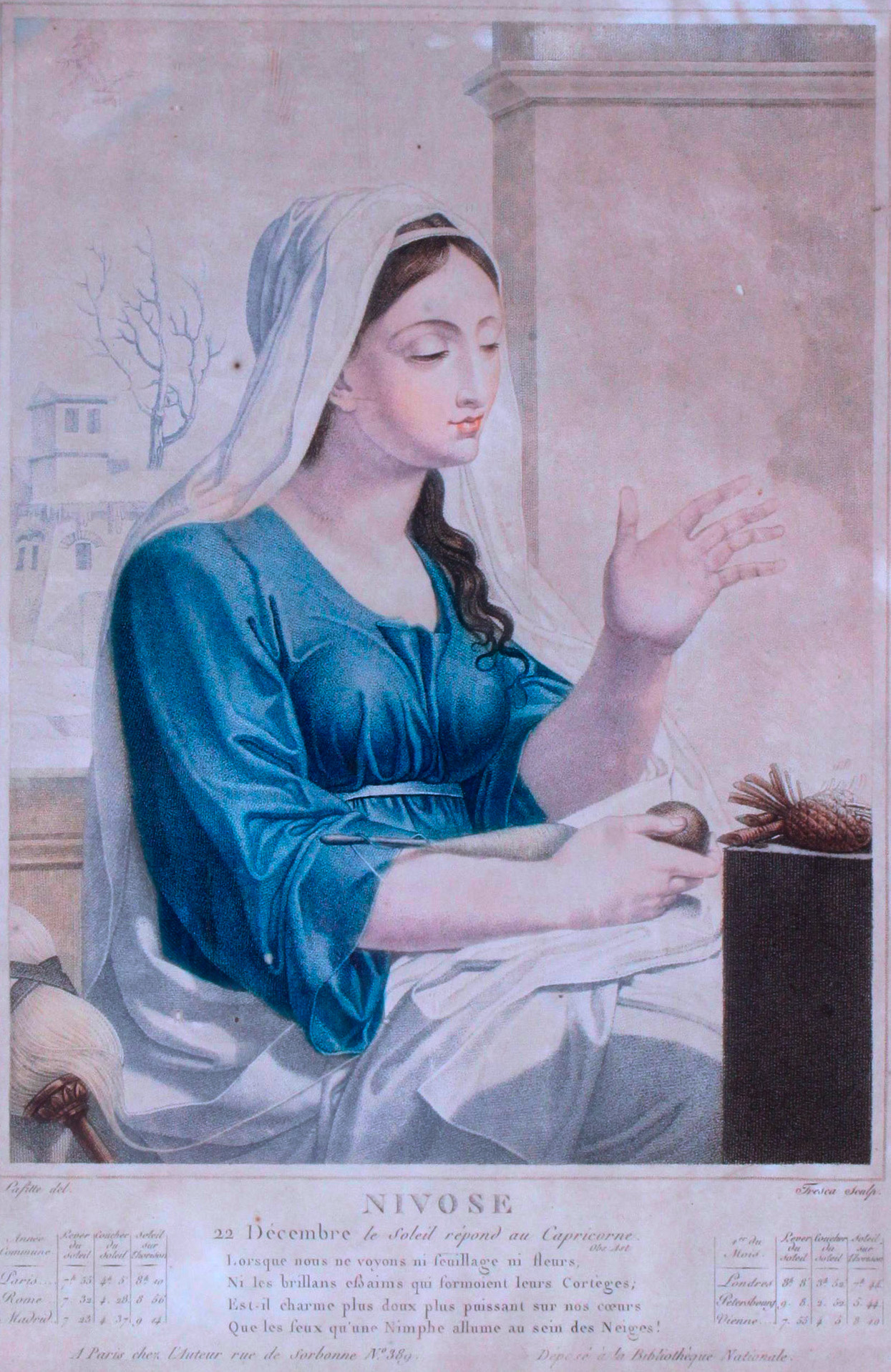
Nivôse

11:56:28
Time of day - 24 h/day
Greenwich

Year: 12
Month: Nivôse
Year: XII

Day of the 10-day
week (décade)
Primidi
Duodi
Tridi
Quartidi
Quintidi
Sextidi
Septidi
Octidi
Nonidi
Décadi

décade 10
1	Friday; 23 December 1803
2	Saturday; 24 December 1803
3	Sunday; 25 December 1803
4	Monday; 26 December 1803
5	Tuesday; 27 December 1803
6	Wednesday; 28 December 1803
7	Thursday; 29 December 1803
8	Friday; 30 December 1803
9	Saturday; 31 December 1803
10	Sunday; 1 January 1804

décade 11
11	Monday; 2 January 1804
12	Tuesday; 3 January 1804
13	Wednesday; 4 January 1804
14	Thursday; 5 January 1804
15	Friday; 6 January 1804
16	Saturday; 7 January 1804
17	Sunday; 8 January 1804
18	Monday; 9 January 1804
19	Tuesday; 10 January 1804
20	Wednesday; 11 January 1804

décade 12
21	Thursday; 12 January 1804
22	Friday; 13 January 1804
23	Saturday; 14 January 1804
24	Sunday; 15 January 1804
25	Monday; 16 January 1804
26	Tuesday; 17 January 1804
27	Wednesday; 18 January 1804
28	Thursday; 19 January 1804
29	Friday; 20 January 1804
30	Saturday; 21 January 1804

Decimal time – 10 h/day
Paris
4:97:54

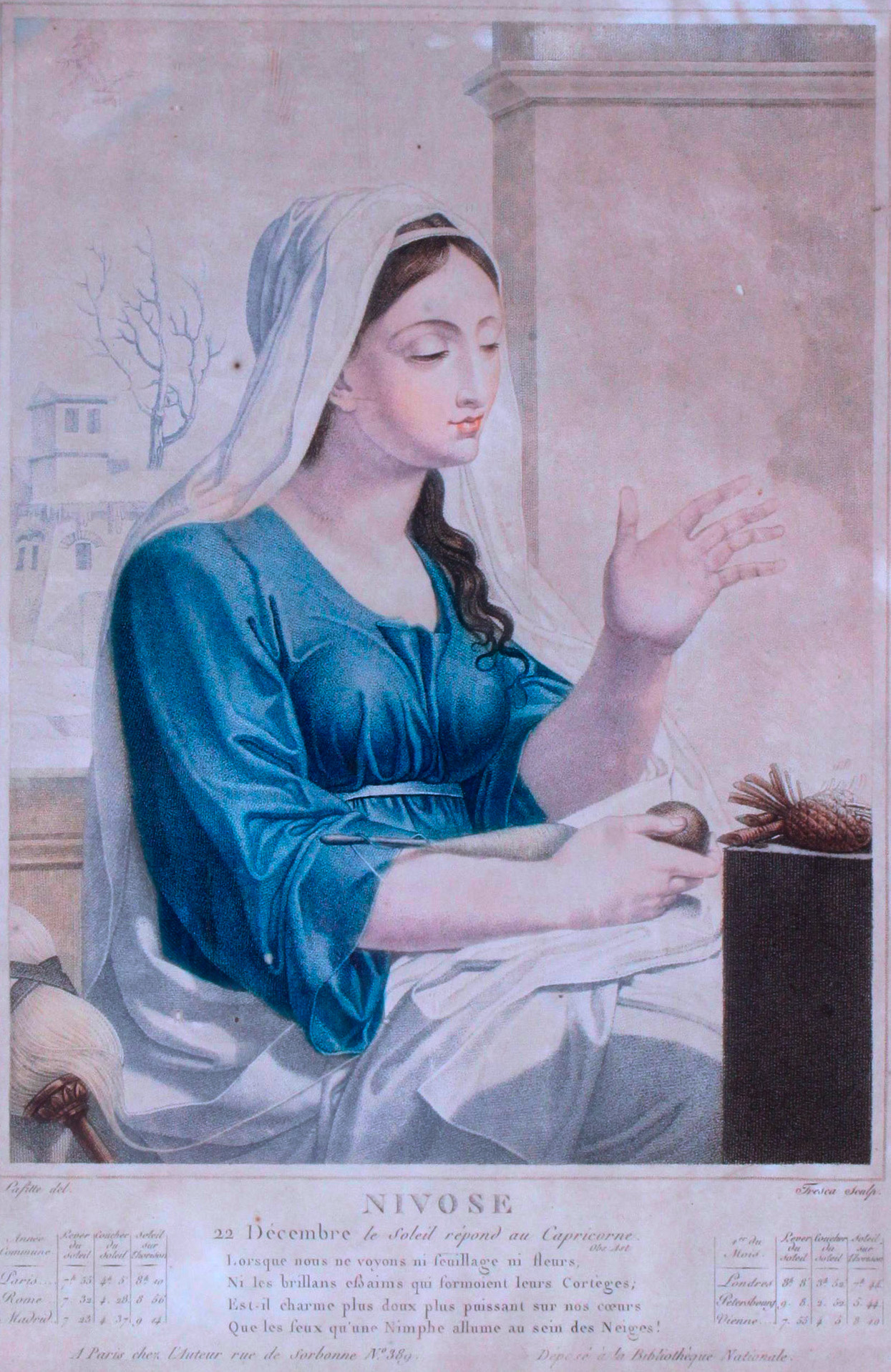
Nivôse

11:56:28
Time of day - 24 h/day
Greenwich

Year: 13
Month: Nivôse
Year: XIII

Day of the 10-day
week (décade)
Primidi
Duodi
Tridi
Quartidi
Quintidi
Sextidi
Septidi
Octidi
Nonidi
Décadi

décade 10
1	Saturday; 22 December 1804
2	Sunday; 23 December 1804
3	Monday; 24 December 1804
4	Tuesday; 25 December 1804
5	Wednesday; 26 December 1804
6	Thursday; 27 December 1804
7	Friday; 28 December 1804
8	Saturday; 29 December 1804
9	Sunday; 30 December 1804
10	Monday; 31 December 1804

décade 11
11	Tuesday; 1 January 1805
12	Wednesday; 2 January 1805
13	Thursday; 3 January 1805
14	Friday; 4 January 1805
15	Saturday; 5 January 1805
16	Sunday; 6 January 1805
17	Monday; 7 January 1805
18	Tuesday; 8 January 1805
19	Wednesday; 9 January 1805
20	Thursday; 10 January 1805

décade 12
21	Friday; 11 January 1805
22	Saturday; 12 January 1805
23	Sunday; 13 January 1805
24	Monday; 14 January 1805
25	Tuesday; 15 January 1805
26	Wednesday; 16 January 1805
27	Thursday; 17 January 1805
28	Friday; 18 January 1805
29	Saturday; 19 January 1805
30	Sunday; 20 January 1805

Decimal time – 10 h/day
Paris
4:97:54

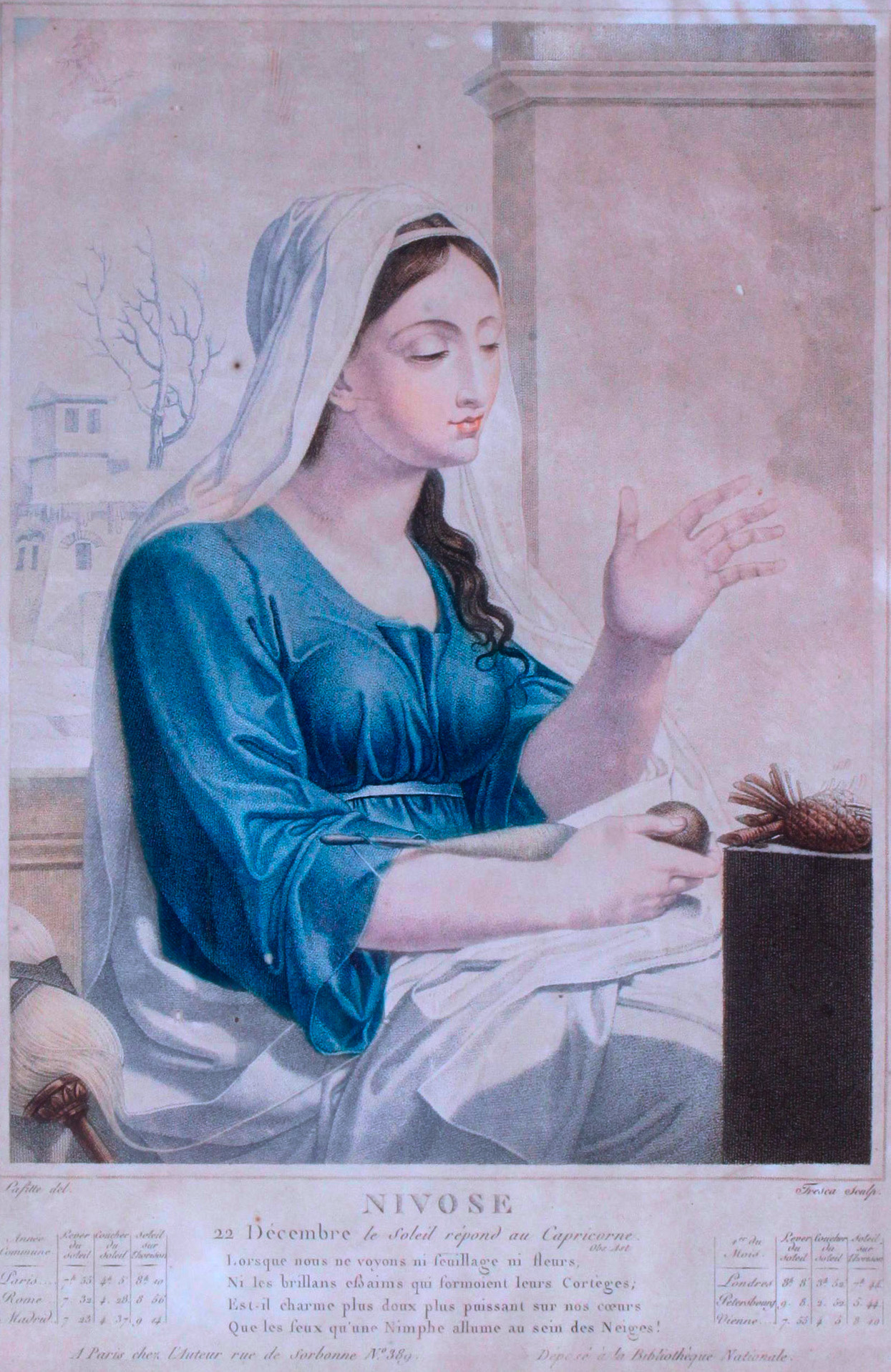
Nivôse

11:56:28
Time of day - 24 h/day
Greenwich

Year: 14
Month: Nivôse
Year: XIV

Day of the 10-day
week (décade)
Primidi
Duodi
Tridi
Quartidi
Quintidi
Sextidi
Septidi
Octidi
Nonidi
Décadi

décade 10
1	Sunday; 22 December 1805
2	Monday; 23 December 1805
3	Tuesday; 24 December 1805
4	Wednesday; 25 December 1805
5	Thursday; 26 December 1805
6	Friday; 27 December 1805
7	Saturday; 28 December 1805
8	Sunday; 29 December 1805
9	Monday; 30 December 1805
10	Tuesday; 31 December 1805

décade 11
11	Wednesday; 1 January 1806
12	Thursday; 2 January 1806
13	Friday; 3 January 1806
14	Saturday; 4 January 1806
15	Sunday; 5 January 1806
16	Monday; 6 January 1806
17	Tuesday; 7 January 1806
18	Wednesday; 8 January 1806
19	Thursday; 9 January 1806
20	Friday; 10 January 1806

décade 12
21	Saturday; 11 January 1806
22	Sunday; 12 January 1806
23	Monday; 13 January 1806
24	Tuesday; 14 January 1806
25	Wednesday; 15 January 1806
26	Thursday; 16 January 1806
27	Friday; 17 January 1806
28	Saturday; 18 January 1806
29	Sunday; 19 January 1806
30	Monday; 20 January 1806

Decimal time – 10 h/day
Paris
4:97:54

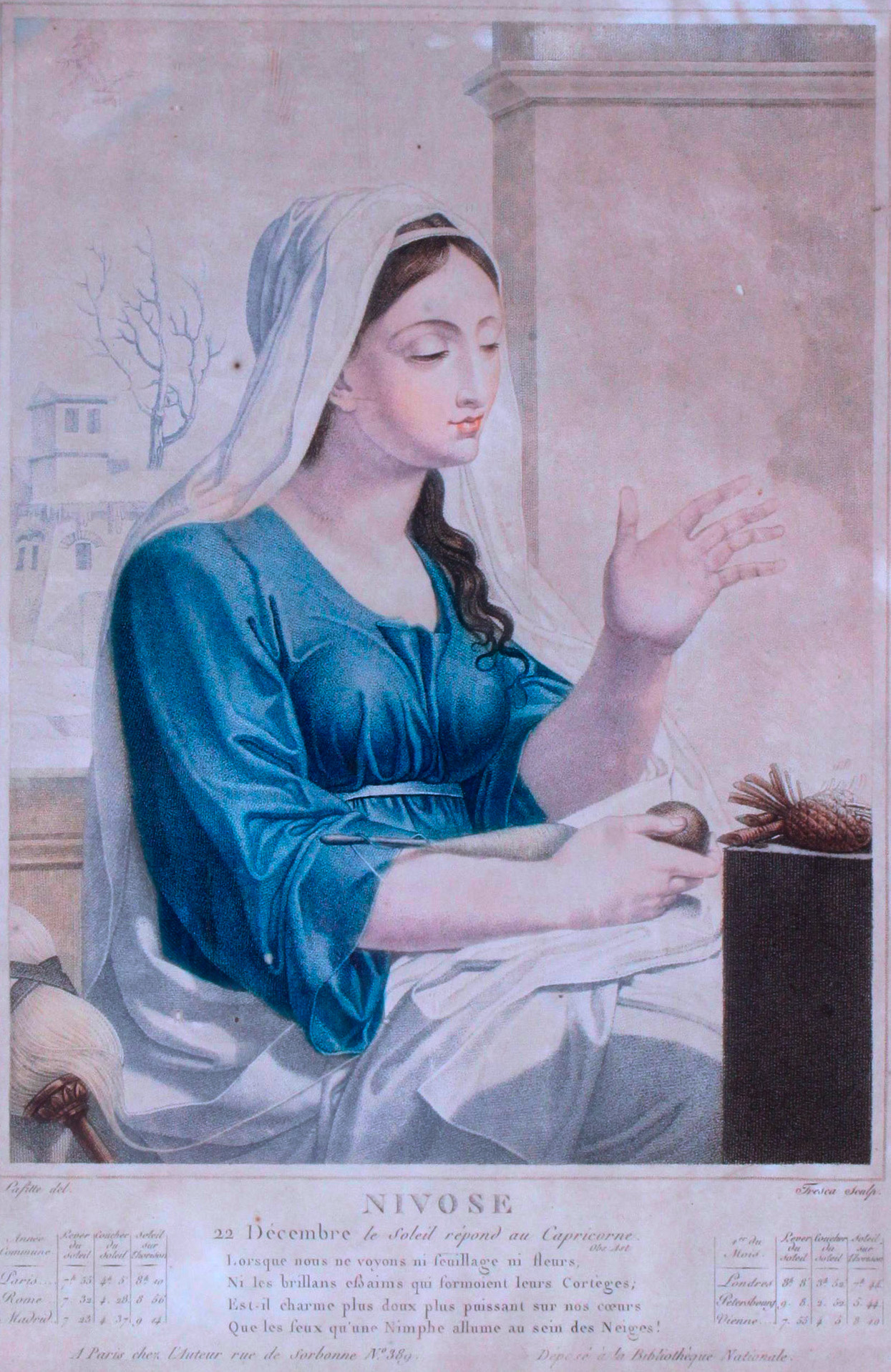
Nivôse

11:56:28
Time of day - 24 h/day
Greenwich

== Day name table ==
Like all months in the French Republican Calendar, Nivôse lasted 30 days and was divided into three 10-day weeks called décades (decades). The 5th (Quintidi) day of every decade was named after a domestic animal, the 10th day (Decadi) after an agricultural tool (Decadi). Different from the other months the rest of the days were not named after an agricultural plant, but after a mineral or animal substance. Fabre d'Églantine says about this topic:

"In Nivôse earth is sealed and usually covered with snow. At this time earth is resting and there are no herbal agriculture products to characterize this month. We rather took names of animal and mineral substances of agricultural use."

	1^{re} Décade		2^{e} Décade		3^{e} Décade
Primidi	1.	Tourbe (Peat)	11.	Granit (Granite)	21.	Pierre à plâtre (Gypsum)
Duodi	2.	Houille (Coal)	12.	Argile (Clay)	22.	Sel (Salt)
Tridi	3.	Bitume (Asphalt)	13.	Ardoise (Slate)	23.	Fer (Iron)
Quartidi	4.	Soufre (Sulphur)	14.	Grès (Sandstone)	24.	Cuivre (Copper)
Quintidi	5.	Chien (Dog)	15.	Lapin (Coney)	25.	Chat (Cat)
Sextidi	6.	Lave (Lava)	16.	Silex (Flint)	26.	Étain (Tin)
Septidi	7.	Terre végétale (Topsoil)	17.	Marne (Marl)	27.	Plomb (Lead)
Octidi	8.	Fumier (Manure)	18.	Pierre à chaux (Limestone)	28.	Zinc (Zinc)
Nonidi	9.	Salpêtre (Nitrate)	19.	Marbre (Marble)	29.	Mercure (Mercury)
Decadi	10.	Fléau (Flail)	20.	Van (Winnowing Basket)	30.	Crible (Sieve)

== Conversion table ==
Table for conversion between Republican and Gregorian Calendar
for the month "Nivôse"

I. / II. / III. / V. / VI. / VII.
1	2	3	4	5	6	7	8	9	10	11	12	13	14	15	16	17	18	19	20	21	22	23	24	25	26	27	28	29	30
21	22	23	24	25	26	27	28	29	30	31	1	2	3	4	5	6	7	8	9	10	11	12	13	14	15	16	17	18	19
December / 1792–1793 / 1793–1794 / 1794–1795 / 1796–1797 / 1797–1798 / 1798–1799 / January

IV. / VIII. / IX. / X. / XI. / XIII. / XIV.
1	2	3	4	5	6	7	8	9	10	11	12	13	14	15	16	17	18	19	20	21	22	23	24	25	26	27	28	29	30
22	23	24	25	26	27	28	29	30	31	1	2	3	4	5	6	7	8	9	10	11	12	13	14	15	16	17	18	19	20
December / 1795–1796 / 1799–1800 / 1800–1801 / 1801–1802 / 1802–1803 / 1804–1805 / 1805 / January

XII.
1	2	3	4	5	6	7	8	9	10	11	12	13	14	15	16	17	18	19	20	21	22	23	24	25	26	27	28	29	30
23	24	25	26	27	28	29	30	31	1	2	3	4	5	6	7	8	9	10	11	12	13	14	15	16	17	18	19	20	21
December / 1803–1804 / January
