= Jean Duplessis-Bertaux =

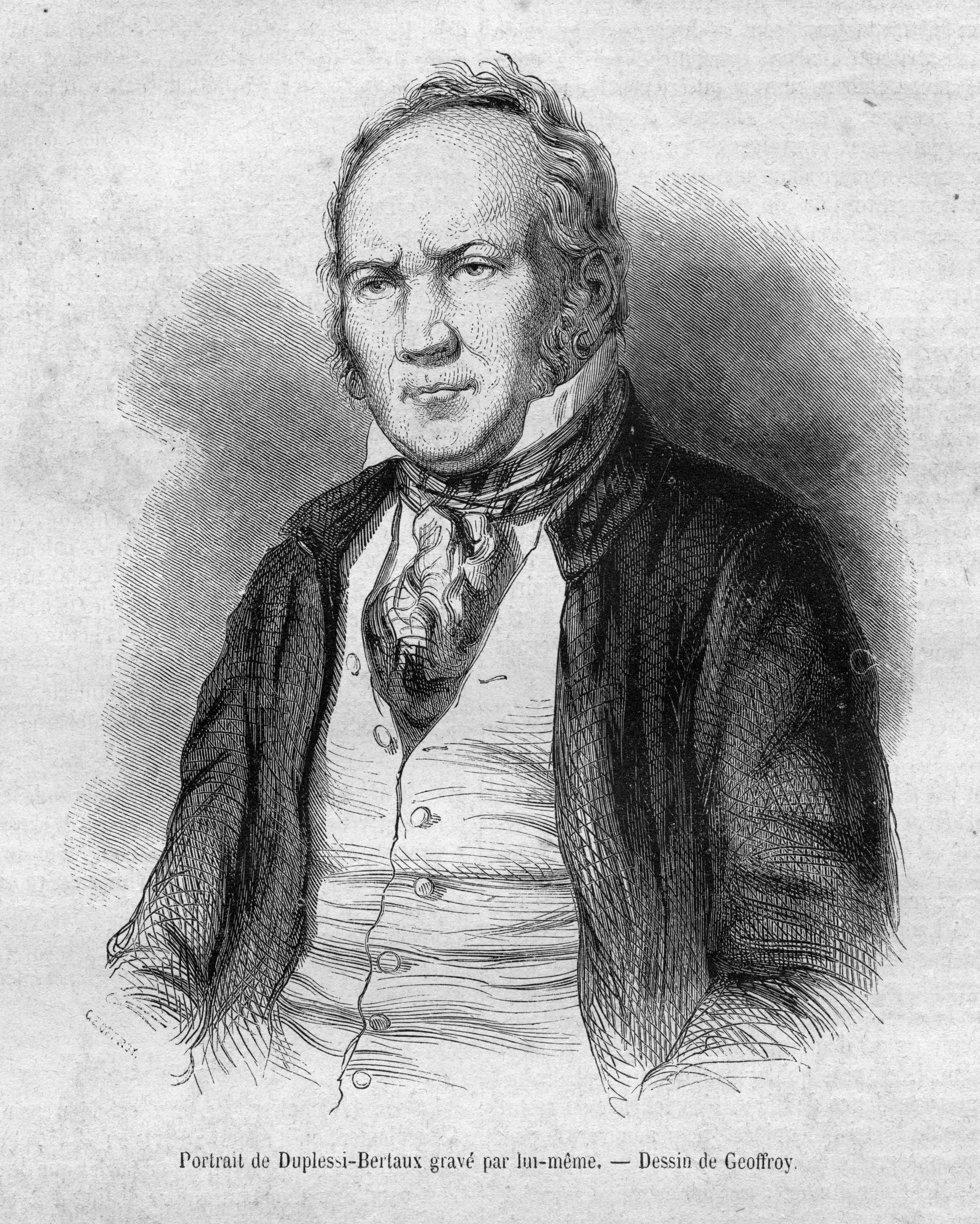
Engraved self-portrait by Duplessis-Bertraux

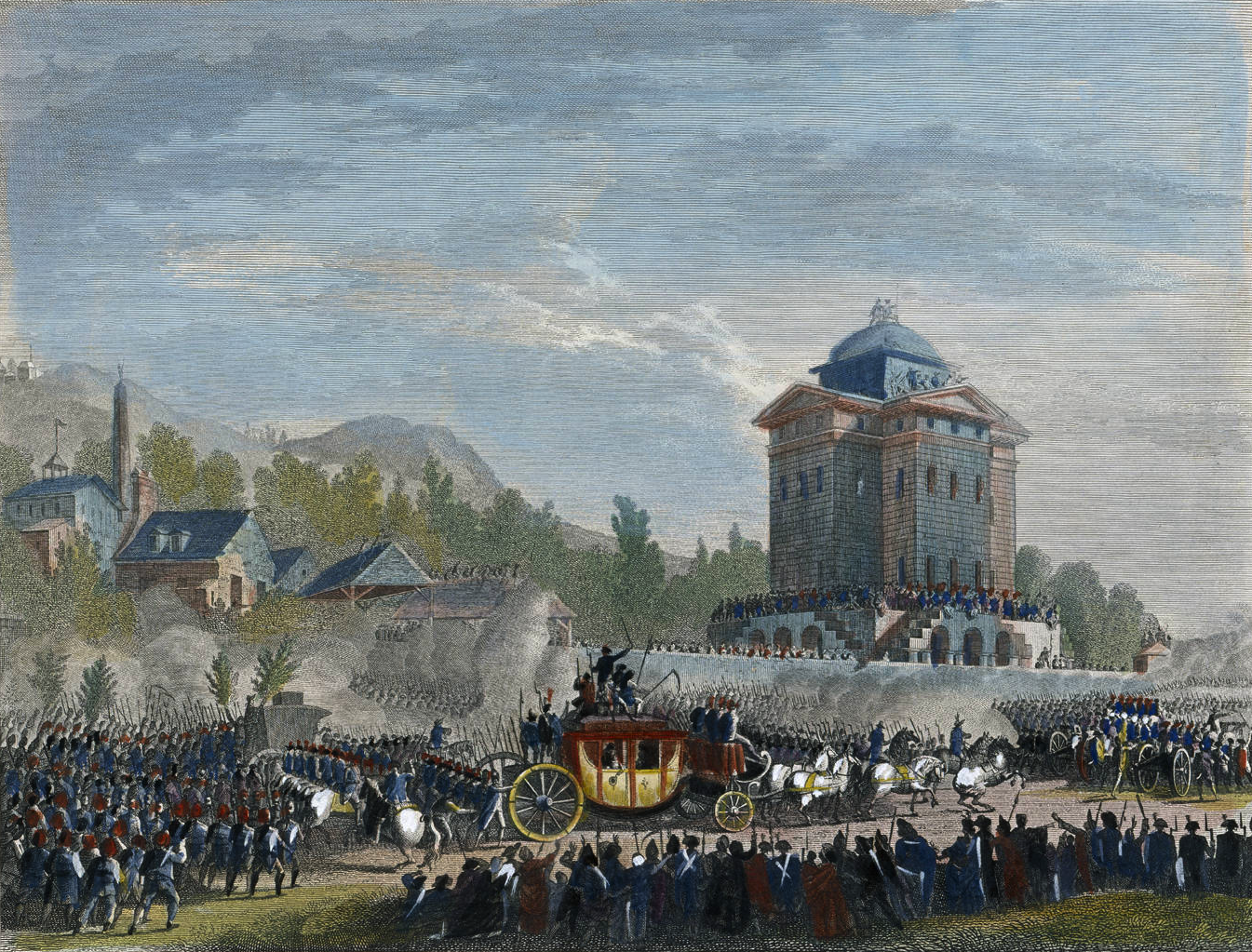
Return from Varennes – Louis XVI's arrival in Paris, engraving by Duplessis-Betraux after a drawing by Jean-Louis Prieur (1791).

Jean Duplessis-Bertaux (1747–1819) was a French painter, draughtsman and producer of etchings and burin engravings. He signed himself Duplessi-Bertaux., Jean Duplessi-Bertaux, Duplessis-Bertaux or JD Bertaux. Some of his prints are attributed to Duplessis Berthault – however, this probably refers to Duplessis and his engraver (Pierre-Gabriel) Berthault. Prints at that time always bore the names of both the draughtsman and the engraver but in these cases two names were probably mistranscribed as one by a past cataloguer.

He produced prints of Scènes de la Révolution (he had taken part in the French Revolution himself), the Cris de Paris (Street Cries of Paris) and the Campagnes de Napoléon (illustrating Bonaparte's Italian campaigns, after paintings by Carle Vernet). He also collaborated on some prints with Jean-Louis Delignon, who sometimes completed unfinished work by Duplessis-Bertraux, and also produced a number of pornographic prints (sometimes unsigned and only later re-attributed to him).
