= Goul =

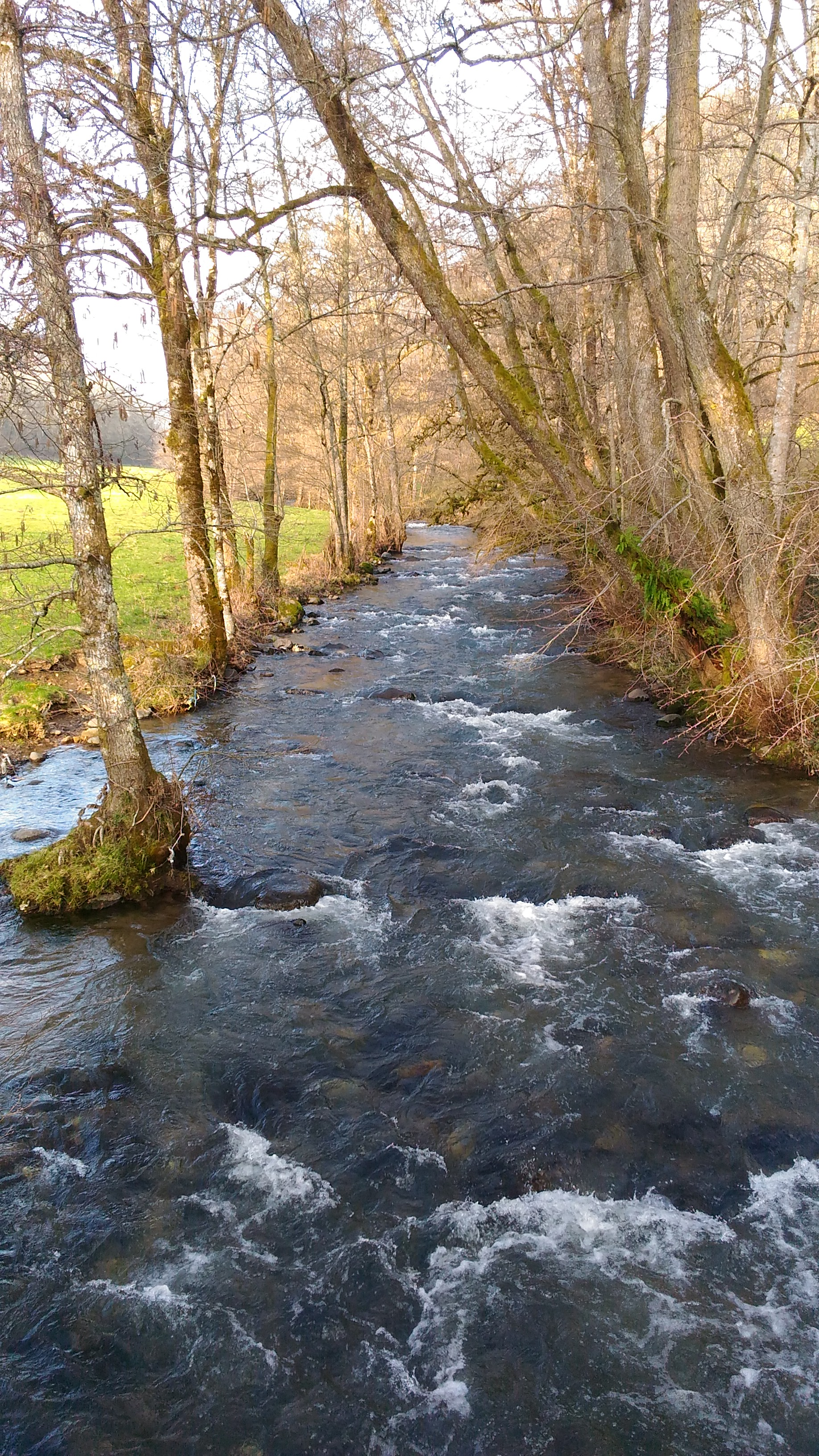

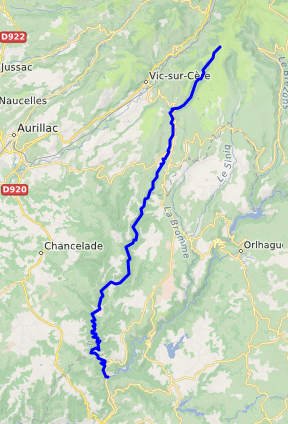

Location
- Country: France

Physical characteristics
- Mouth: Truyère
  - coordinates: 44°41′36″N 2°34′21″E
- Length: 52.0 km (32.3 mi)

Basin features
- Progression: Truyère→ Lot→ Garonne→ Gironde estuary→ Atlantic Ocean

Goul (Occitan: Gól) is a river in the Massif Central of France. The river runs through the Cantal (Vezels-Roussy, Leucamp, Ladinhac, Lapeyrugue, Cros-de-Ronesque, Jou-sous-Monjou, Saint-Clément, Pailherols, Taussac, Raulhac) and the Aveyron (Saint-Hippolyte, Murols) for 52 kilometres. In turn, Goul is a tributary of the larger river Truyère.
