= Carladès =

Natural region in France

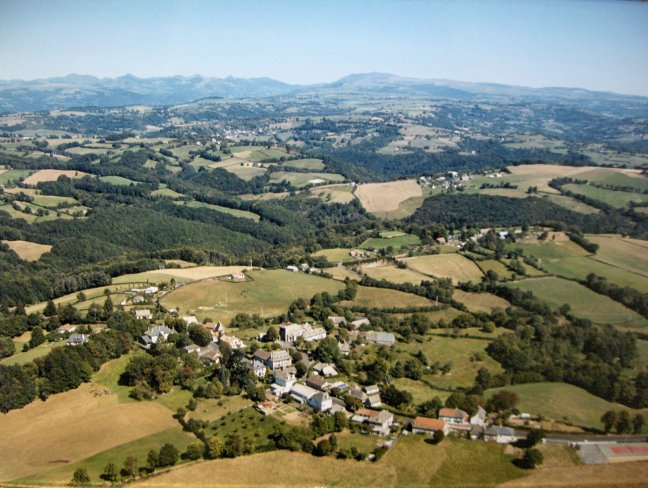
- Drone view of the village of Labrousse
- Interactive map of Carladès
- Coordinates: 44°55′31″N 2°26′23″E
- Country: France
- Regions: Auvergne-Rhône-Alpes; Occitania
- Departments: Cantal; Aveyron

Carladès, or Carladez, is a natural region and pays in France located in the center-west of the Massif Central. The area spans the departments of Cantal and Aveyron. Its origins date back to the ancient viscounty of Carlat, a subdivision of the County of Auvergne, which was significantly larger than the current natural region.

== Toponymy ==
The name Carladès derives from the town of Carlat, which was the military seat of the viscounty. The suffix "ès" is from standardized Occitan.

== Geography ==
Located on the southern slope of the Cantal mountains, the current territory of Carladès is divided by the four valleys of Cère, Brezons, Goul and Bromme. While the altitude and climate of the two northern valleys create a typically mountainous region, the two southern-oriented valleys feature a more Mediterranean landscape in their lower parts.

Carladès is an undulating plateau surrounded by the following natural regions:

- To the north by the Cantal mountains and Planèze de Saint-Flour
- To the southwest by Châtaigneraie
- To the south-east by the Viadène
- Further south, without being bordering, by pays de Conques.

== History ==
=== Middle Ages ===
The military capital was located in Carlat and the judicial capital later became Vic. In 839, Louis the Pious besieged and confiscated it.

Originating from the feudal grant by the abbots of Aurillac of the former hereditary domain of Géraud d'Aurillac, Carladès succeeded it in the 9th century as one of the five Carolingian counties of Auvergne.

Initially, Carladès was the territory of a Merovingian viscounty straddling Auvergne and Rouergue. At the end of the Ancien Régime, these two territories each had their own jurisdiction:

- The jurisdiction of Carladès, located in Vic and under the parliament of Paris.
- The jurisdiction of Carladez in Mur-de-Barrez under the parliament of Toulouse.

During the Carolingian era, Carlat was a viguerie.

The region was long held by the viscounts of Millau and then by the viscounts of Rodez, with the viscounts of Carlat swearing homage to the abbot of Aurillac.

Viscount Renaud IV of Pons (1291–1356) reportedly aligned with the English king Edward III, but in 1345 he fought under the French king's banner in several places. In 1356, Renaud IV of Carlat and his son died at the Battle of Maupertuis near Poitiers. A few years later, the Treaty of Brétigny was repudiated.

=== Modern era ===
In 1510, during the drafting of the customs of Auvergne, Suzanne de Bourbon, as the Viscountess of Carlat, asserted that Carladès had its own distinct rights and customs, separate from those of the former County of Auvergne, which it had never been part of.

After a period of peace, the Wars of Religion were particularly violent in the region. As during the Hundred Years' War, "routiers," armed bands of both Catholics and Protestants, attacked castles, which served as their bases for pillaging the countryside, only to return them for ransom. They also targeted towns and abbeys.

Queen Margaret, the first wife of Henry of Navarre, sided with the Catholic League. Rejected by her husband, she was forced to live in Auvergne, residing for over a year in Carlat before being confined to Château d'Usson, where she stayed for 19 years. In 1603, Henry IV ordered the demolition of the castles of Murat and Carlat.

In 1643, Louis XIII elevated the Viscounty of Carlat, having removed the Viscounty of Murat from it, to the County of Carladès. By the Treaty of Péronne, he granted it, along with other territories, to Honoré II Grimaldi (1623-1651) to thank him for his alliance and to compensate for the loss of his lordships in Spain.

The current Prince of Monaco, Albert II, owns Château de Carlat, which was repurchased by his great-great-grandfather, Prince Albert I, through Société de la Haute-Auvergne. The title of Count of Carladès, now a title of Monegasque nobility, was granted by his father to Princess Gabriella of Monaco, who became the Countess of Carladès at birth.

=== The revolutionary period ===
In 1789, during the creation of the departments, there was a consideration to align the region of Carladès with the new territorial divisions. Historically, it made sense for Carladès, which was divided between two provinces, to remain united, and for the Rouergue part to be attached to the new department of Cantal. This idea had supporters in Rouergue, but Bishop Villaret of Rodez, along with Andurand, who were tasked with the study by the deputies, decided otherwise. They argued, among other things, that the Upper Auvergne region was more heavily taxed and that the city of Aurillac was too distant and inaccessible. Consequently, the request from the people of Auvergne was rejected, and Barrez became definitively part of Aveyron.
