= SiteW =

French company

SiteWeb
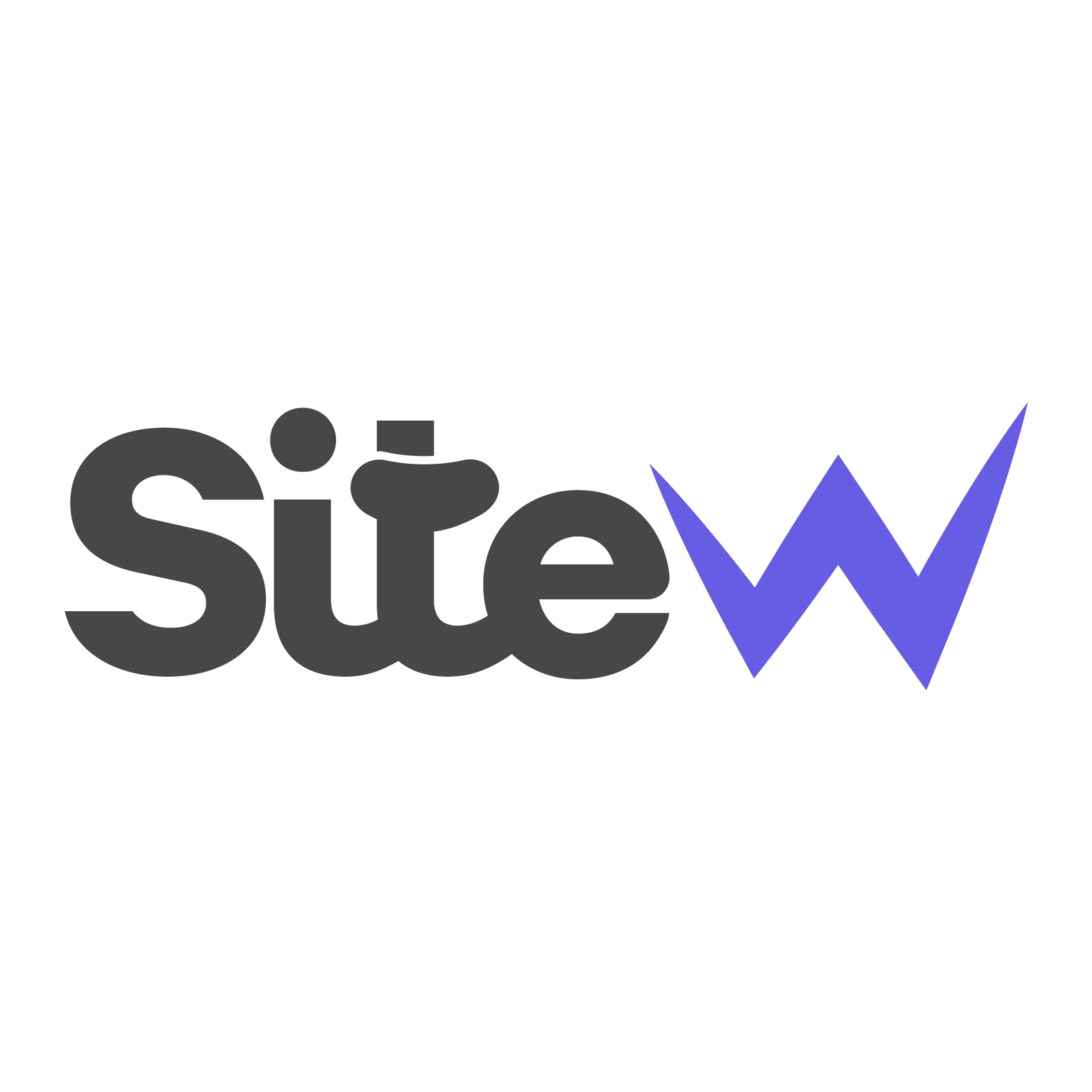
- Type: Private company
- Industry: Internet; Computer software; Web hosting service
- Founded: October 20, 2009; 17 years ago
- Founders: Fabien Versange; Cédric Hamel
- Headquarters: Yolet, Cantal, Auvergne-Rhône-Alpes, France
- Area served: Worldwide
- Key people: Fabien Versange (CEO); Cédric Hamel (CTO)
- Products: Web services
- Website: www.sitew.com

SiteW (French pronunciation: [sit dublə ve]) is a French company offering a website building service.

== History ==
SiteW was created in the spring of 2007, when Fabien Versange and Cédric Hamel, two computer scientists, were approached by several local businesses in the Auvergne region to design their websites. This common demand in the Auvergne region inspired them to form a company to design a platform which offers websites that are faster, easier and more accessible to individuals.

Hailing from Cantal, in the central region of France, the company was registered at the Chamber of Commerce of Aurillac in January 2008, where they opened their offices in nearby Calvinet before relocating to Cassaniouze after three years, launching their website and online web services a month later.

== Growth ==
Hundreds of users signed up within the first couple of months and the first companies outside of France made use of the service by September of the same year. In 2011 the German version of the website was released. In 2014 the company upgraded all their website building tools. By 2016 the company had launched over 1.5 million websites for a global customer base spread across 216 countries. On average 600 new websites per day are launched by people using the SiteW services.

== Functionality ==
The company offers a web based service, using the SaaS model, making the platform easy to access without having to download any applications. The tools are easy to understand, using a simple drag-and-drop method for creating a website. The websites that are created are hosted on a secured server using cloud technology that can be accessed from around the world. The company offers three different packages which provide different functionality and amount of storage space. Making use of HTML5 and CSS3, the website and its services are updated frequently to ensure proper integration and performance on all platforms.

== Awards ==
- 2010 Concours Talents
  - Category: Technological innovation (Winners)
- 2016 Pépites d’Auvergne
  - For the region of Cantal (Winners)

== See also ==
- Breezi
