= Sansac =

Sansac may refer to:

Places

- Sansac-Veinazès, a commune in Cantal department, south-central France
- Sansac-de-Marmiesse, a commune in Cantal department, south-central France
- Chateau of Sansac, in Beaulieu-sur-Sonnette, a commune in Charente department, southwestern France

People

- Antoine Prévost de Sansac (c. 1506 - 1591), French Roman Catholic archbishop
- Jean Baptiste, marquis de Traversay (Jean-Baptiste Prevost de Sansac de Traversay, 1754-1831), French naval officer
- Louis Prévost de Sansac (1496-1576), French nobleman and soldier
