= Labesserette =

Commune in Auvergne-Rhône-Alpes, France

- Commune
- Location of Labesserette
- Location within France Location within Auvergne-Rhône-Alpes
- Coordinates: 44°44′33″N 2°27′43″E
- Country: France
- Region: Auvergne-Rhône-Alpes
- Department: Cantal
- Arrondissement: Aurillac
- Canton: Arpajon-sur-Cère
- Intercommunality: Châtaigneraie Cantalienne

Government
  - Mayor (2020–2026): Claude Delmas
- Area^{1}: 13.64 km^{2} (5.27 sq mi)
- Elevation: 520 m (1,710 ft)
- Highest elevation: 775 m (2,543 ft)
- Lowest elevation: 517 m (1,696 ft)
- Population (2023): 302
  - Density: 22.1/km^{2} (57.3/sq mi)
- Time zone: UTC+01:00 (CET)
  - Summer (DST): UTC+02:00 (CEST)
- INSEE/Postal code: 15084 /15120
- ^{1} French Land Register data, which excludes lakes, ponds, glaciers > 1 km^{2} (0.386 sq mi or 247 acres) and river estuaries.

Labesserette is a commune in the Cantal department in south-central France.

== Population ==
Historical population
Year	Pop.	±% p.a.
1968	347	—
1975	308	−1.69%
1982	303	−0.23%
1990	291	−0.50%
1999	260	−1.24%
2007	264	+0.19%
2012	281	+1.26%
2017	293	+0.84%
2023	302	+0.51%
Source: INSEE

== See also ==
- Communes of the Cantal department
