= Lacapelle-del-Fraisse =

Commune in Auvergne-Rhône-Alpes, France

- Commune
- Location of Lacapelle-del-Fraisse
- Location within France Location within Auvergne-Rhône-Alpes
- Coordinates: 44°46′52″N 2°26′15″E
- Country: France
- Region: Auvergne-Rhône-Alpes
- Department: Cantal
- Arrondissement: Aurillac
- Canton: Arpajon-sur-Cère

Government
  - Mayor (2020–2026): André Vaurs
- Area^{1}: 15.29 km^{2} (5.90 sq mi)
- Elevation: 830 m (2,720 ft)
- Highest elevation: 834 m (2,736 ft)
- Lowest elevation: 579 m (1,900 ft)
- Population (2023): 394
  - Density: 25.8/km^{2} (66.7/sq mi)
- Time zone: UTC+01:00 (CET)
  - Summer (DST): UTC+02:00 (CEST)
- INSEE/Postal code: 15087 /15120
- ^{1} French Land Register data, which excludes lakes, ponds, glaciers > 1 km^{2} (0.386 sq mi or 247 acres) and river estuaries.

Lacapelle-del-Fraisse (French pronunciation: [lakapɛl dɛl fʁɛs]; Occitan: La Capèla del Fraisse) is a commune in the Cantal department in south-central France.

== Population ==
Historical population
Year	Pop.	±% p.a.
1968	294	—
1975	305	+0.53%
1982	261	−2.20%
1990	262	+0.05%
1999	251	−0.48%
2007	287	+1.69%
2012	316	+1.94%
2017	344	+1.71%
2023	394	+2.29%
Source: INSEE

== See also ==
- Communes of the Cantal department
