= Lafeuillade-en-Vézie =

Commune in Auvergne-Rhône-Alpes, France

- Commune
- Location of Lafeuillade-en-Vézie
- Location within France Location within Auvergne-Rhône-Alpes
- Coordinates: 44°47′24″N 2°27′38″E
- Country: France
- Region: Auvergne-Rhône-Alpes
- Department: Cantal
- Arrondissement: Aurillac
- Canton: Arpajon-sur-Cère

Government
  - Mayor (2020–2026): Jean-Louis Fresquet
- Area^{1}: 16.54 km^{2} (6.39 sq mi)
- Elevation: 760 m (2,490 ft)
- Highest elevation: 834 m (2,736 ft)
- Lowest elevation: 660 m (2,170 ft)
- Population (2023): 583
  - Density: 35.2/km^{2} (91.3/sq mi)
- Time zone: UTC+01:00 (CET)
  - Summer (DST): UTC+02:00 (CEST)
- INSEE/Postal code: 15090 /15130
- ^{1} French Land Register data, which excludes lakes, ponds, glaciers > 1 km^{2} (0.386 sq mi or 247 acres) and river estuaries.

Lafeuillade-en-Vézie (French pronunciation: [lafœjad ɑ̃ vezi]; Occitan: La Folhada de Vesia) is a commune in the Cantal department in south-central France.

== Population ==
Historical population
Year	Pop.	±% p.a.
1968	457	—
1975	518	+1.81%
1982	484	−0.97%
1990	430	−1.47%
1999	514	+2.00%
2007	564	+1.17%
2012	583	+0.66%
2017	595	+0.41%
2023	583	−0.34%
Source: INSEE

== See also ==
- Communes of the Cantal department
