= Saint-Étienne-de-Carlat =

Commune in Auvergne-Rhône-Alpes, France

- Commune
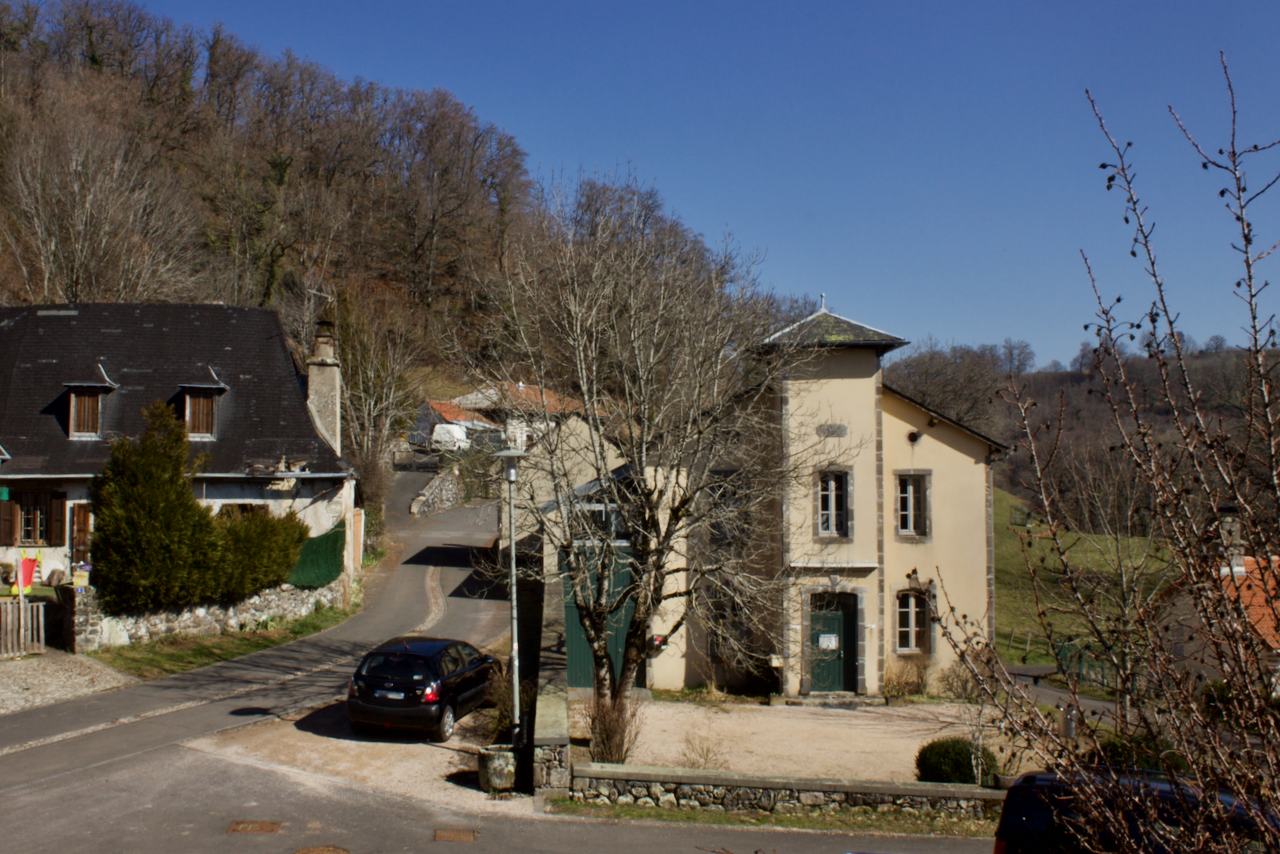
- Saint-Étienne-de-Carlat Town hall
- Location of Saint-Étienne-de-Carlat
- Location within France Location within Auvergne-Rhône-Alpes
- Coordinates: 44°54′20″N 2°34′31″E
- Country: France
- Region: Auvergne-Rhône-Alpes
- Department: Cantal
- Arrondissement: Aurillac
- Canton: Vic-sur-Cère
- Intercommunality: Cère et Goul en Carladès

Government
  - Mayor (2020–2026): Michel Besombes
- Area^{1}: 10.62 km^{2} (4.10 sq mi)
- Elevation: 886 m (2,907 ft)
- Highest elevation: 949 m (3,114 ft)
- Lowest elevation: 674 m (2,211 ft)
- Population (2023): 119
  - Density: 11.2/km^{2} (29.0/sq mi)
- Time zone: UTC+01:00 (CET)
  - Summer (DST): UTC+02:00 (CEST)
- INSEE/Postal code: 15183 /15130
- ^{1} French Land Register data, which excludes lakes, ponds, glaciers > 1 km^{2} (0.386 sq mi or 247 acres) and river estuaries.

Saint-Étienne-de-Carlat (French pronunciation: [sɛ̃.t‿etjɛn də kaʁla]; Occitan: Sant Estève de Carlat) is a commune in the Cantal department in south-central France.

== Population ==
Historical population
Year	Pop.	±% p.a.
1968	145	—
1975	111	−3.75%
1982	108	−0.39%
1990	105	−0.35%
1999	115	+1.02%
2007	119	+0.43%
2012	141	+3.45%
2017	132	−1.31%
2023	119	−1.71%
Source: INSEE

== See also ==
- Communes of the Cantal department
