= Thiézac =

Commune in Auvergne-Rhône-Alpes, France

- Commune
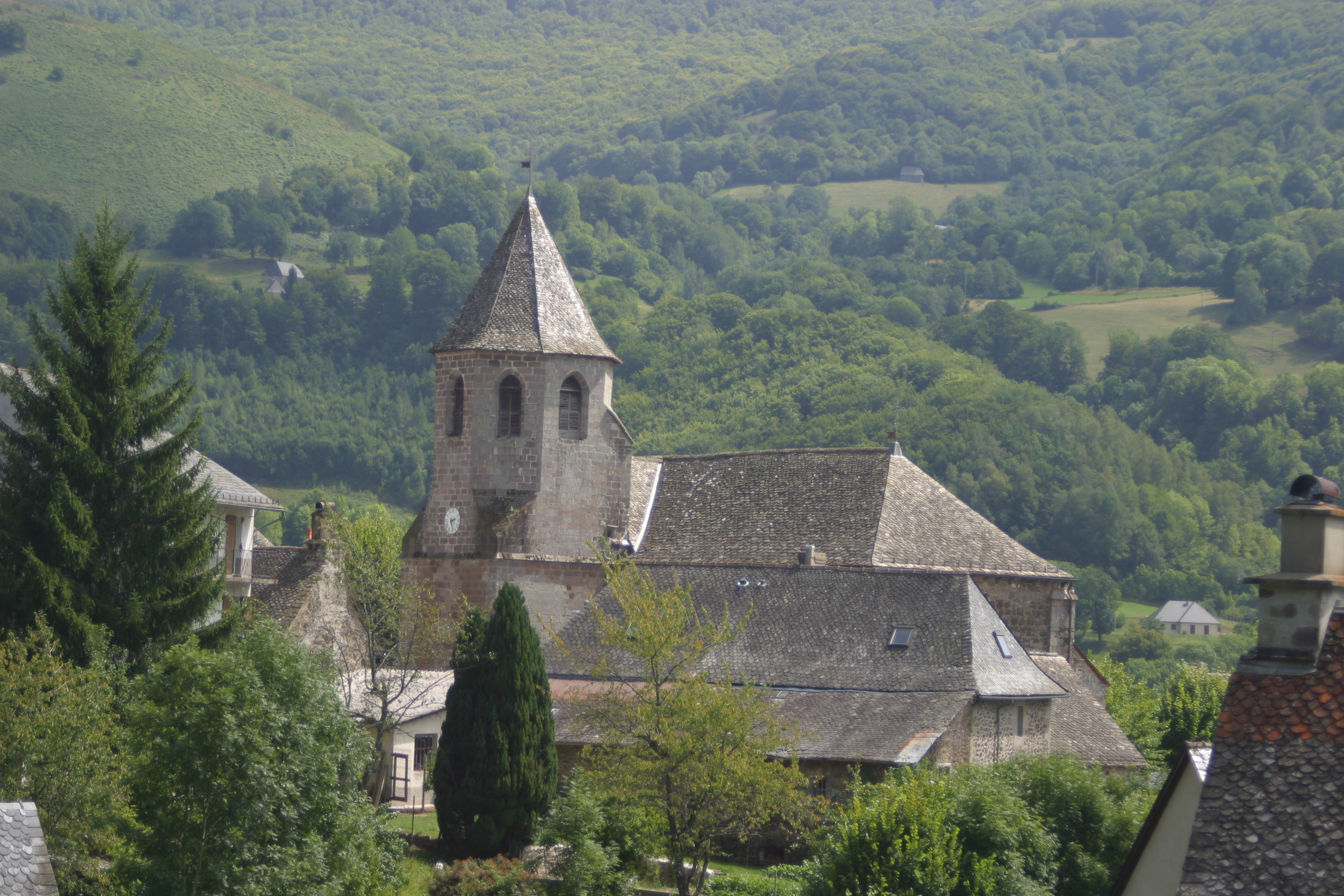
- The church of Saint-Martin, in Thiézac
- Location of Thiézac
- Location within France Location within Auvergne-Rhône-Alpes
- Coordinates: 45°00′56″N 2°39′55″E
- Country: France
- Region: Auvergne-Rhône-Alpes
- Department: Cantal
- Arrondissement: Aurillac
- Canton: Vic-sur-Cère
- Intercommunality: Cère et Goul en Carladès

Government
  - Mayor (2020–2026): Philippe Mourgues
- Area^{1}: 41.7 km^{2} (16.1 sq mi)
- Elevation: 805 m (2,641 ft)
- Highest elevation: 1,565 m (5,135 ft)
- Lowest elevation: 673 m (2,208 ft)
- Population (2023): 590
  - Density: 14/km^{2} (37/sq mi)
- Time zone: UTC+01:00 (CET)
  - Summer (DST): UTC+02:00 (CEST)
- INSEE/Postal code: 15236 /15800
- ^{1} French Land Register data, which excludes lakes, ponds, glaciers > 1 km^{2} (0.386 sq mi or 247 acres) and river estuaries.

Thiézac (French pronunciation: [tjezak]; Occitan: Tiesac) is a commune in the Cantal department in south-central France.

== Population ==
Historical population
Year	Pop.	±% p.a.
1968	1,010	—
1975	789	−3.47%
1982	742	−0.87%
1990	693	−0.85%
1999	614	−1.34%
2007	600	−0.29%
2012	616	+0.53%
2017	604	−0.39%
2023	590	−0.39%
Source: INSEE

== See also ==
- Communes of the Cantal department
