= Breezi =

Web design application

- Developer: Freshout LLC
- Stable release: 1.0 / April 2012
- Operating system: Cross-platform
- Type: Website builder
- Website: breezi.com

Breezi is a web design application that allows users to create, design, and manage a website online, without any coding experience. The design, layout customization, and content management system are integrated into one visual editor.

Breezi originally targeted designers during its beta rollout, but since then has been redesigned for a broader audience, including small business owners, web designers and developers, and individuals with varying levels of technology expertise.

== History ==
Breezi was created by Freshout, a San Francisco Bay Area digital agency. Breezi was developed as an expansion of another of the company's products, a 2008 WordPress content management plugin called Flutter.

By 2013, Flutter had garnered over 150,000 downloads by the WordPress community; the decision was made in late 2009 to cease development on Flutter, and start from scratch building what would become Breezi.

Breezi launched its beta version in March 2012 as an integrated platform enabling users to create, design, and launch a website, with complete control over the look and feel of the site. It has been well received by the technology and design news media. As of September 2012, over 30,000 websites have been created with Breezi.

== Features ==
Breezi allows users to choose from a selection of grid-based wireframes or pre-designed themes. All of the specific areas of design customization are separated. The areas, or units, of design can be managed individually and also combined in various ways. This approach departs from the more common page template model.

Particular features of the editor are "Style dots", a bulk style editor, a layout builder, box-model design management, domain pointing and FTP syncing.

Breezi doesn't handle e-mail hosting, and has limited FTP options.

Content on a Breezi website is managed through Apps, which can be added to the site's app library through drag-and-drop and then clicked on to change the content. Current Apps enable users to add and modify text, images, videos, galleries, forms, slideshows, social media feeds, carousels, maps, embedded third party widgets, etc.

Each App can have multiple versions used across different pages on a website, and app versions can be renamed, previewed, and installed or removed.

== See also ==
- SiteW
