= Teissières-lès-Bouliès =

Commune in Auvergne-Rhône-Alpes, France

- Commune
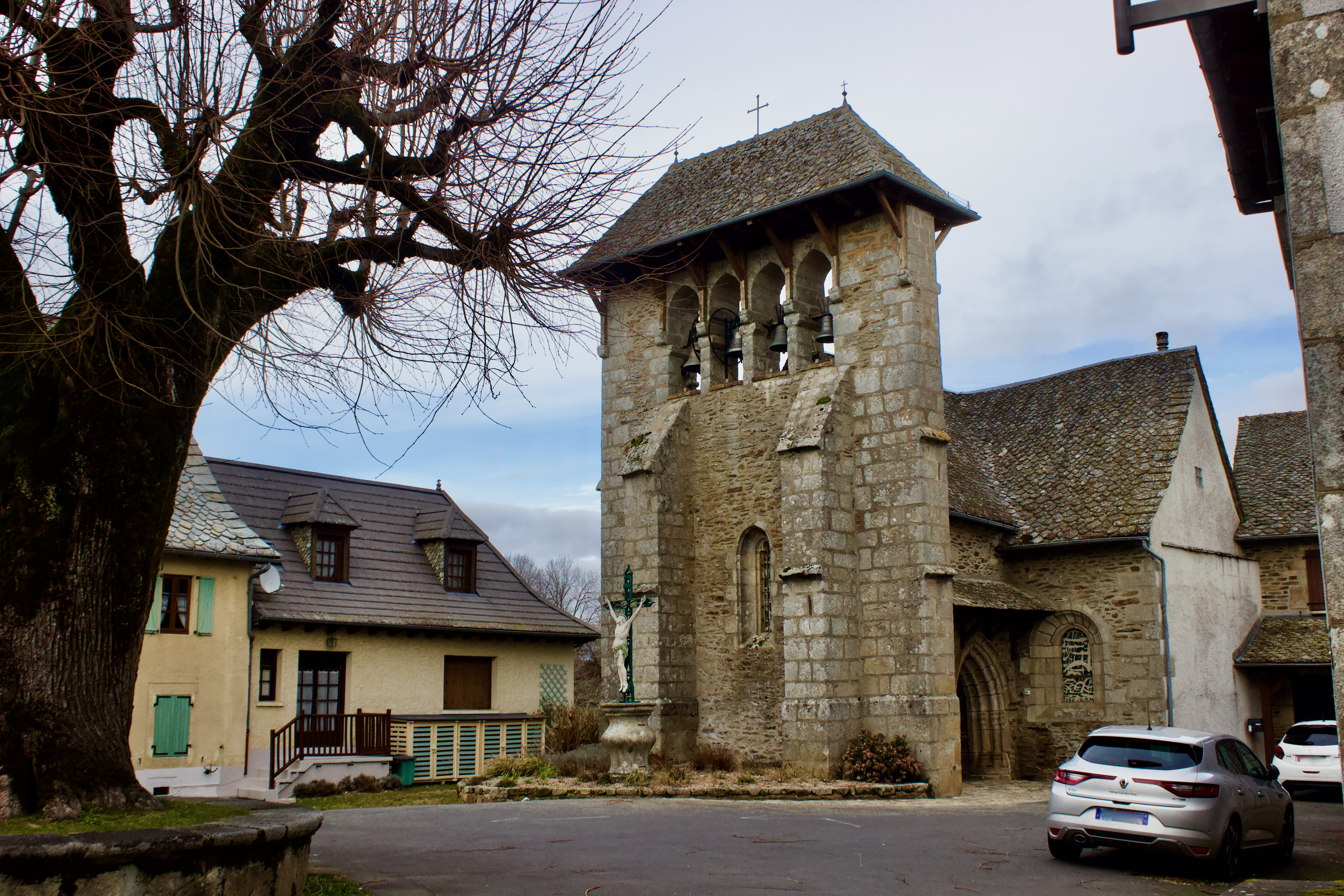
- Location of Teissières-lès-Bouliès
- Location within France Location within Auvergne-Rhône-Alpes
- Coordinates: 44°49′24″N 2°32′40″E
- Country: France
- Region: Auvergne-Rhône-Alpes
- Department: Cantal
- Arrondissement: Aurillac
- Canton: Vic-sur-Cère

Government
  - Mayor (2020–2026): Yves Coussain (UDI)
- Area^{1}: 19.51 km^{2} (7.53 sq mi)
- Elevation: 720 m (2,360 ft)
- Highest elevation: 821 m (2,694 ft)
- Lowest elevation: 402 m (1,319 ft)
- Population (2023): 344
  - Density: 17.6/km^{2} (45.7/sq mi)
- Time zone: UTC+01:00 (CET)
  - Summer (DST): UTC+02:00 (CEST)
- INSEE/Postal code: 15234 /15130
- ^{1} French Land Register data, which excludes lakes, ponds, glaciers > 1 km^{2} (0.386 sq mi or 247 acres) and river estuaries.

Teissières-lès-Bouliès (French pronunciation: [tɛsjɛʁ lɛ buljɛs]; Occitan: Teissièras) is a commune in the Cantal department in south-central France.

== Population ==
Historical population
Year	Pop.	±% p.a.
1968	365	—
1975	369	+0.16%
1982	338	−1.25%
1990	319	−0.72%
1999	268	−1.92%
2007	305	+1.63%
2012	316	+0.71%
2017	329	+0.81%
2023	344	+0.75%
Source: INSEE

== See also ==
- Communes of the Cantal department
