= Vieillevie =

Commune in Auvergne-Rhône-Alpes, France

- Commune
- Location of Vieillevie
- Location within France Location within Auvergne-Rhône-Alpes
- Coordinates: 44°38′46″N 2°25′06″E
- Country: France
- Region: Auvergne-Rhône-Alpes
- Department: Cantal
- Arrondissement: Aurillac
- Canton: Arpajon-sur-Cère

Government
  - Mayor (2020–2026): Jean-Louis Recoussines
- Area^{1}: 9.65 km^{2} (3.73 sq mi)
- Elevation: 220 m (720 ft)
- Highest elevation: 660 m (2,170 ft)
- Lowest elevation: 188 m (617 ft)
- Population (2023): 102
  - Density: 10.6/km^{2} (27.4/sq mi)
- Time zone: UTC+01:00 (CET)
  - Summer (DST): UTC+02:00 (CEST)
- INSEE/Postal code: 15260 /15120
- ^{1} French Land Register data, which excludes lakes, ponds, glaciers > 1 km^{2} (0.386 sq mi or 247 acres) and river estuaries.

Vieillevie (French pronunciation: [vjɛjvi]; Occitan: Vièlhaviá) is a commune in the department of Cantal in south-central France. The village stands on the north (right) bank of the River Lot, approximately 12 km west of Entraygues. The river here is the boundary between the departments of Cantal and Aveyron, and a bridge takes you from the village into Aveyron. The village is 32 km south of the large town of Aurillac and 35 km north of the large town of Rodez.

In the village are a castle, a church, a hotel with an excellent restaurant (Hotel de la Terrasse), and a shop/cafe which offers many services.

== Population ==
Historical population
Year	Pop.	±% p.a.
1968	213	—
1975	194	−1.33%
1982	197	+0.22%
1990	146	−3.68%
1999	114	−2.71%
2007	114	+0.00%
2012	112	−0.35%
2017	111	−0.18%
2023	102	−1.40%
Source: INSEE

== Monuments ==
The Château de Vieillevie, a mediaeval castle modified in the 16th century, is in the centre of the village next to the Mairie. It is a monument historique.

== See also ==
- Communes of the Cantal department
