= Canton of Arpajon-sur-Cère =

Coordinates: 44.90°N 2.46°E

- Canton
- Situation of the canton of Arpajon-sur-Cère in the department of Cantal
- Country: France
- Region: Auvergne-Rhône-Alpes
- Department: Cantal
- No. of communes: {{{nbcomm}}}
- Population (2023): 11,237
- INSEE code: 1501

The canton of Arpajon-sur-Cère (Occitan: canton d'Arpajon de Cera) is an administrative division of the Cantal department, southern France. Its borders were modified at the French canton reorganisation which came into effect in March 2015. Its seat is in Arpajon-sur-Cère.

It consists of the following communes:

1. Arpajon-sur-Cère
2. Cassaniouze
3. Junhac
4. Labesserette
5. Lacapelle-del-Fraisse
6. Ladinhac
7. Lafeuillade-en-Vézie
8. Lapeyrugue
9. Leucamp
10. Montsalvy
11. Prunet
12. Sansac-Veinazès
13. Sénezergues
14. Vieillevie
