= Prunet, Cantal =

Commune in Auvergne-Rhône-Alpes, France

Prunet
- Commune
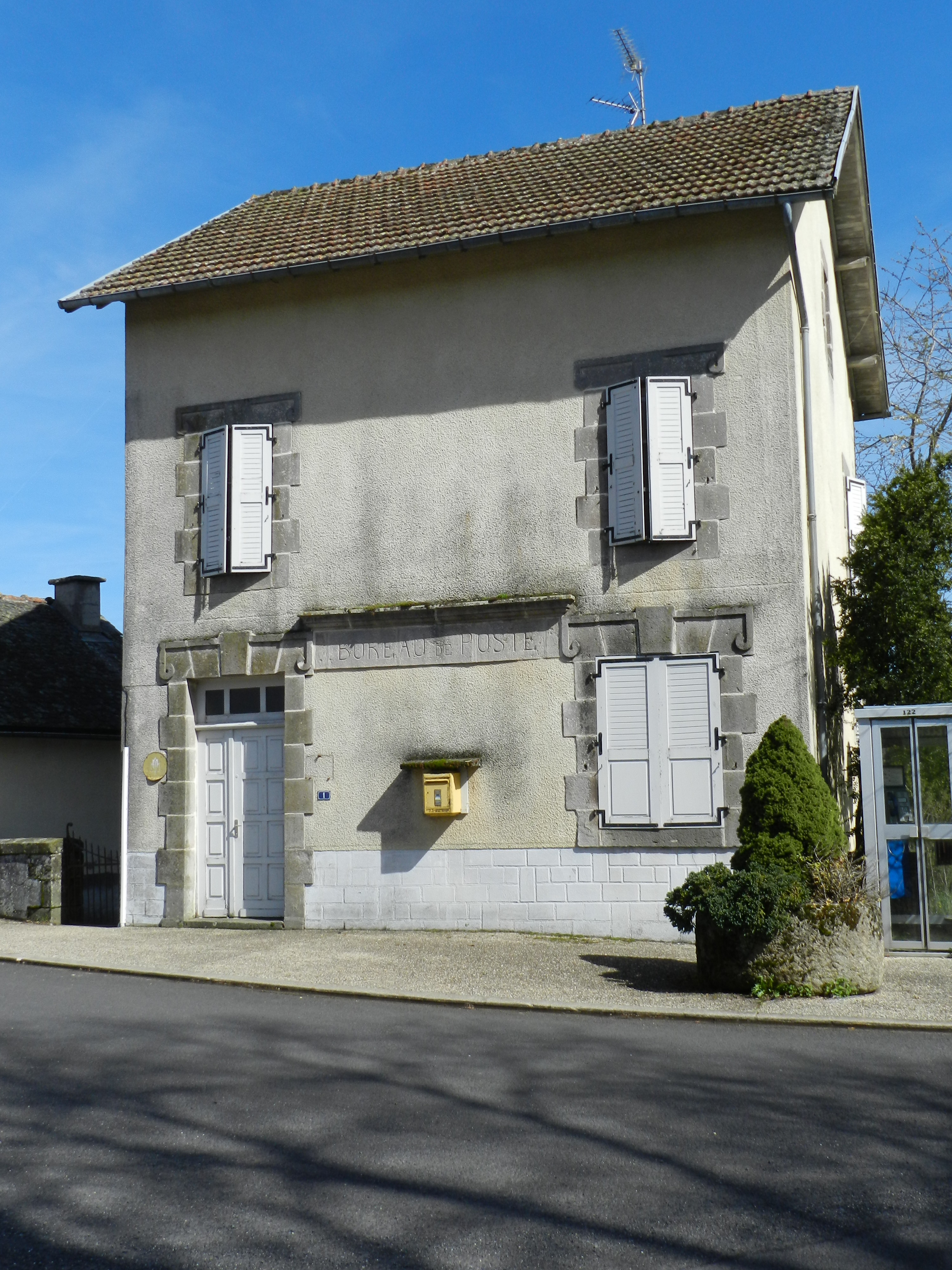
- The old post office in Prunet
- Location of Prunet
- Location within France Location within Auvergne-Rhône-Alpes
- Coordinates: 44°49′17″N 2°27′51″E
- Country: France
- Region: Auvergne-Rhône-Alpes
- Department: Cantal
- Arrondissement: Aurillac
- Canton: Arpajon-sur-Cère
- Intercommunality: Châtaigneraie Cantalienne

Government
  - Mayor (2020–2026): David Ernest
- Area^{1}: 27.34 km^{2} (10.56 sq mi)
- Elevation: 780 m (2,560 ft)
- Highest elevation: 823 m (2,700 ft)
- Lowest elevation: 639 m (2,096 ft)
- Population (2023): 683
  - Density: 25.0/km^{2} (64.7/sq mi)
- Time zone: UTC+01:00 (CET)
  - Summer (DST): UTC+02:00 (CEST)
- INSEE/Postal code: 15156 /15130
- ^{1} French Land Register data, which excludes lakes, ponds, glaciers > 1 km^{2} (0.386 sq mi or 247 acres) and river estuaries.

Prunet (French pronunciation: [pʁynɛ]) is a commune in the Cantal department in south-central France.

== Population ==
Historical population
Year	Pop.	±% p.a.
1968	462	—
1975	445	−0.53%
1982	445	+0.00%
1990	505	+1.59%
1999	517	+0.26%
2007	501	−0.39%
2012	614	+4.15%
2017	677	+1.97%
2023	683	+0.15%
Source: INSEE

== See also ==
- Communes of the Cantal department
