= Junhac =

Commune in Auvergne-Rhône-Alpes, France

- Commune
- Location of Junhac
- Location within France Location within Auvergne-Rhône-Alpes
- Coordinates: 44°42′50″N 2°27′14″E
- Country: France
- Region: Auvergne-Rhône-Alpes
- Department: Cantal
- Arrondissement: Aurillac
- Canton: Arpajon-sur-Cère
- Intercommunality: Châtaigneraie Cantalienne

Government
  - Mayor (2020–2026): Christian Guy
- Area^{1}: 27.71 km^{2} (10.70 sq mi)
- Elevation: 532 m (1,745 ft)
- Highest elevation: 778 m (2,552 ft)
- Lowest elevation: 280 m (920 ft)
- Population (2023): 286
  - Density: 10.3/km^{2} (26.7/sq mi)
- Time zone: UTC+01:00 (CET)
  - Summer (DST): UTC+02:00 (CEST)
- INSEE/Postal code: 15082 /15120
- ^{1} French Land Register data, which excludes lakes, ponds, glaciers > 1 km^{2} (0.386 sq mi or 247 acres) and river estuaries.

Junhac is a commune in the Cantal department in south-central France.

== Population ==
Historical population
Year	Pop.	±% p.a.
1968	510	—
1975	467	−1.25%
1982	440	−0.85%
1990	381	−1.78%
1999	332	−1.52%
2007	333	+0.04%
2012	320	−0.79%
2017	301	−1.22%
2023	286	−0.85%
Source: INSEE

== See also ==
- Communes of the Cantal department
