= Château de Vieillevie =

Castle in Auvergne-Rhône-Alpes, France

Coordinates: 44.6447°N 2.4195°E

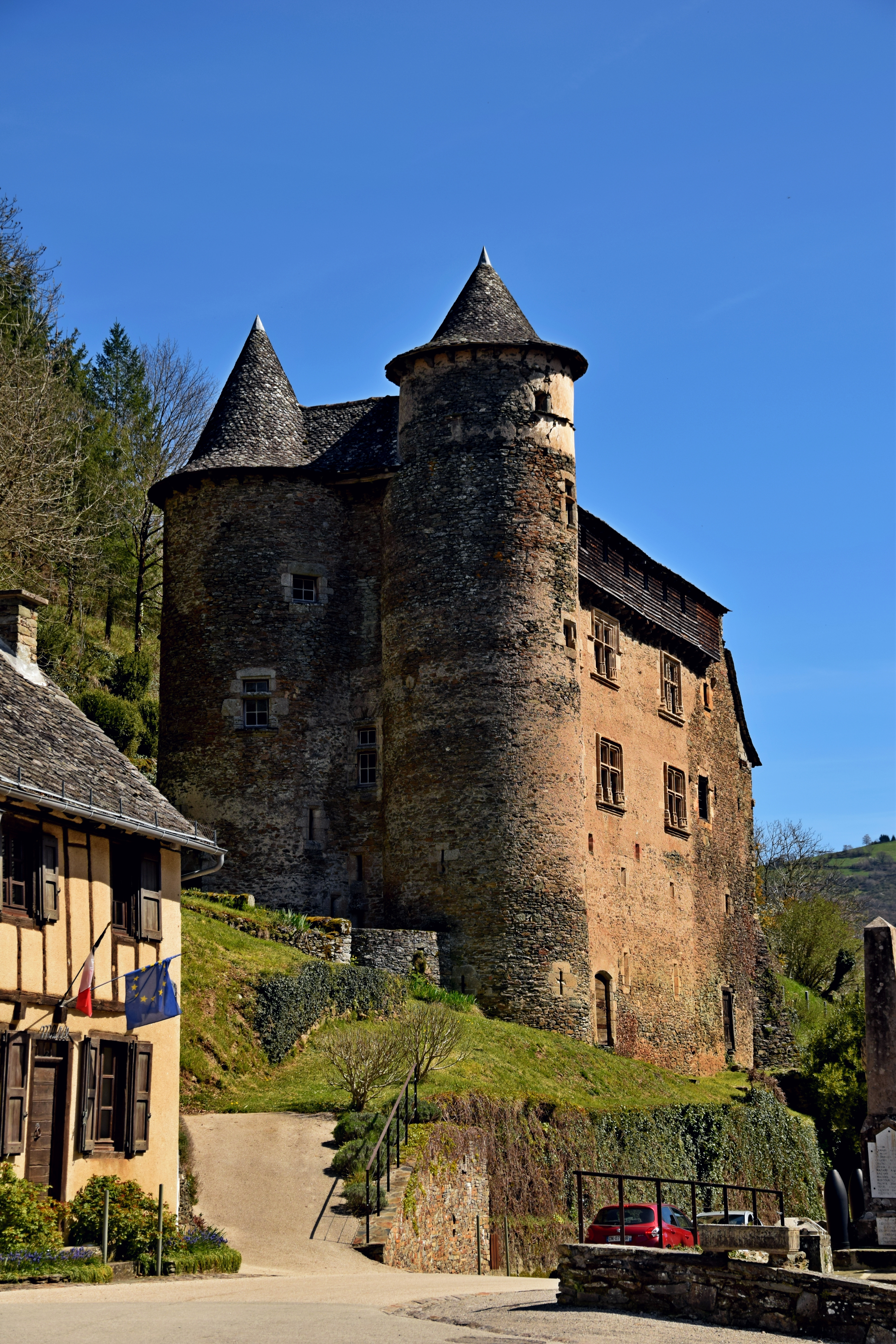
Château de Vieillevie

The Château de Vieillevie is a mediaeval castle in the commune of Vieillevie in the Cantal département of France. The castle is located in the centre of the village on a small rocky hill next to the Mairie.

The original construction dates from the 11th century, with modifications in the 15th and 16th centuries. It consists of a rectangular main building - the corps de logis - with, on the north, a short wing set back on the eastern side. On the south west and north west corners are circular towers. Unusually, the castle still has its wooden hoarding and machicolations. Inside, four beautiful 13th century monumental chimney places have been preserved. The rooms have ceilings covered in beams.

It has been listed since 1993 as a monument historique by the French Ministry of Culture. The castle is open to visitors on certain days in the summer months, with candlelit tours some evenings.

== See also ==
- List of castles in France
