= Giou-de-Mamou =

Commune in Auvergne-Rhône-Alpes, France

- Commune
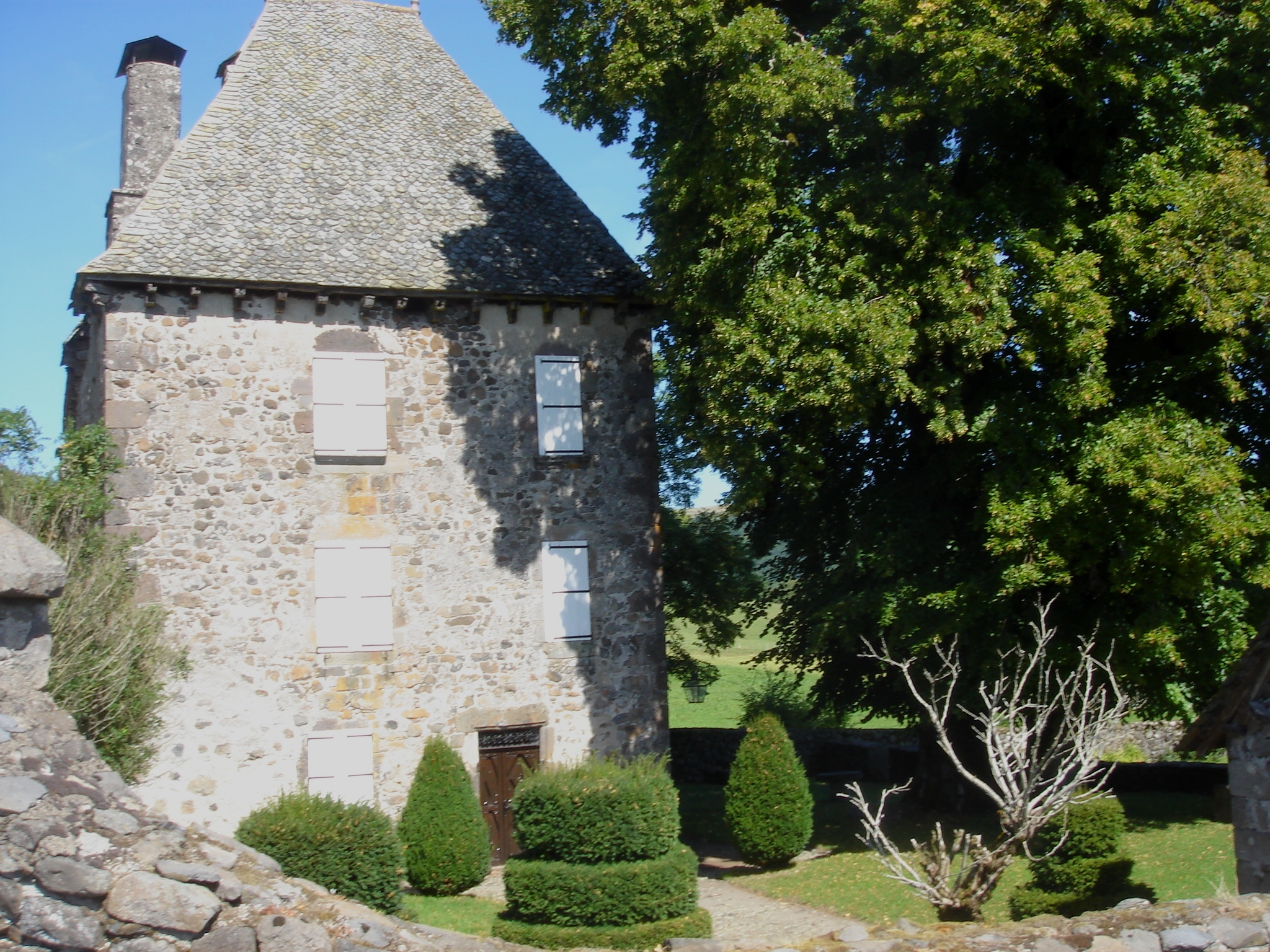
- The Manor of Falhiès, in Giou-de-Mamou
- Location of Giou-de-Mamou
- Location within France Location within Auvergne-Rhône-Alpes
- Coordinates: 44°55′58″N 2°30′53″E
- Country: France
- Region: Auvergne-Rhône-Alpes
- Department: Cantal
- Arrondissement: Aurillac
- Canton: Vic-sur-Cère
- Intercommunality: CA Aurillac Agglomération

Government
  - Mayor (2020–2026): Frédéric Godbarge
- Area^{1}: 14.23 km^{2} (5.49 sq mi)
- Elevation: 640 m (2,100 ft)
- Highest elevation: 966 m (3,169 ft)
- Lowest elevation: 616 m (2,021 ft)
- Population (2023): 728
  - Density: 51.2/km^{2} (133/sq mi)
- Time zone: UTC+01:00 (CET)
  - Summer (DST): UTC+02:00 (CEST)
- INSEE/Postal code: 15074 /15130
- ^{1} French Land Register data, which excludes lakes, ponds, glaciers > 1 km^{2} (0.386 sq mi or 247 acres) and river estuaries.

Giou-de-Mamou (French pronunciation: [ʒju də mamu]; Occitan: Jòu de Mamon) is a commune in the Cantal department in south-central France.

== Geography ==
Giou-de-Mamou is 564 km away from Paris and 6 km away from Aurillac.

The village lies at an altitude of 740 metres and is only 20 km away from the Heart of the Auvergne Volcano Park.

== Language ==
The Occitan language was historically dominant in Cantal.

== Climate ==
Giou de Mamou's climate is quite cold in winter (it snows almost every year), but it can be very hot during the summer times.

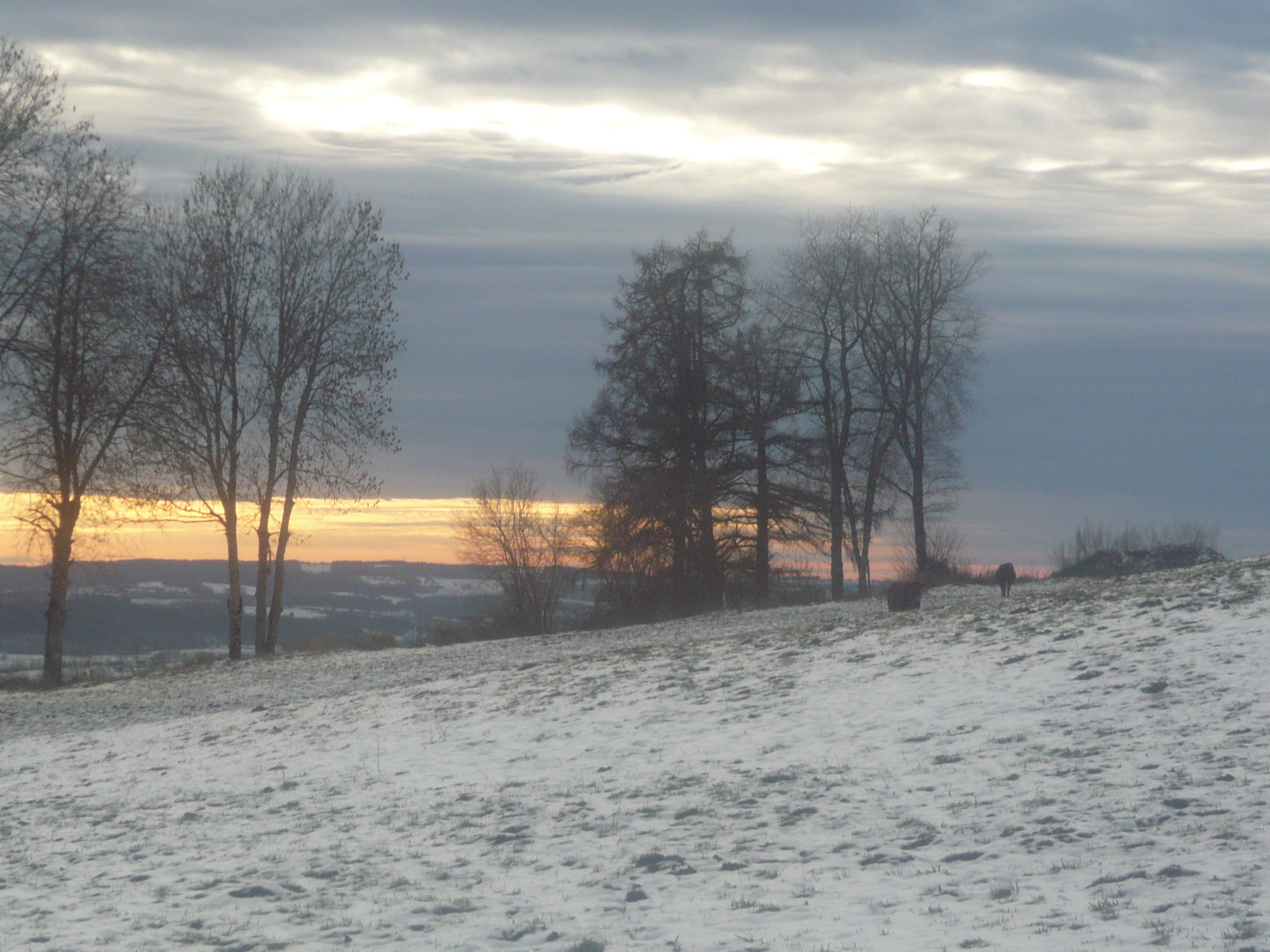
Winter landscape, Espériès, Giou de Mamou, Cantal

== History ==
Giou-de-Mamou's rock has probably been inhabited since the Celtic period (megalithic remains have been found in the village).

The name Giou-de-Mamou is of ancient origins and would indicate that Jupiter (Jovis) was worshiped there.

Prior to the French Revolution Giou de Mamou was part of a former province of Auvergne called Haute-Auvergne. Giou de Mamou joined the Aurillac district in 1990.

== Population ==
Historical population
Year	Pop.	±% p.a.
1968	427	—
1975	461	+1.10%
1982	648	+4.98%
1990	677	+0.55%
1999	697	+0.32%
2007	747	+0.87%
2012	745	−0.05%
2017	785	+1.05%
2023	728	−1.25%
Source: INSEE

== Sights ==
- St-Bonnet Church (Fifteenth Century)
- Megalithic remains, esp. in L'Hôpital (3 km from the centre of the village)
- Beliashe Theatre: Production and distribution of shows

== See also ==
- Communes of the Cantal department
