= Velzic =

Commune in Auvergne-Rhône-Alpes, France

- Commune
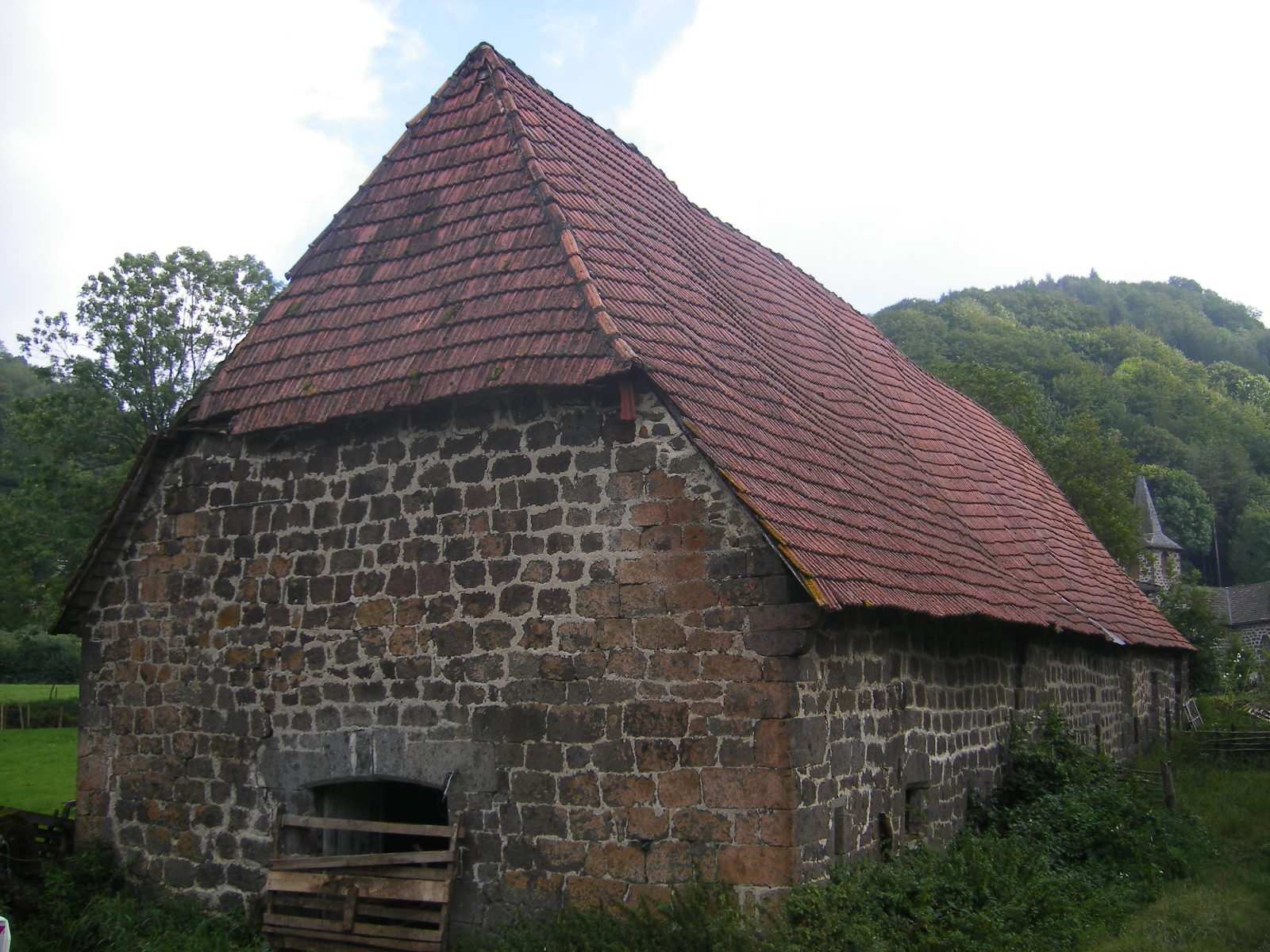
- An old house in Velzic
- Location of Velzic
- Location within France Location within Auvergne-Rhône-Alpes
- Coordinates: 45°00′06″N 2°33′13″E
- Country: France
- Region: Auvergne-Rhône-Alpes
- Department: Cantal
- Arrondissement: Aurillac
- Canton: Vic-sur-Cère
- Intercommunality: CA Aurillac Agglomération

Government
  - Mayor (2020–2026): Jean-François Barrier
- Area^{1}: 11.26 km^{2} (4.35 sq mi)
- Elevation: 730 m (2,400 ft)
- Highest elevation: 1,173 m (3,848 ft)
- Lowest elevation: 693 m (2,274 ft)
- Population (2023): 401
  - Density: 35.6/km^{2} (92.2/sq mi)
- Time zone: UTC+01:00 (CET)
  - Summer (DST): UTC+02:00 (CEST)
- INSEE/Postal code: 15252 /15590
- ^{1} French Land Register data, which excludes lakes, ponds, glaciers > 1 km^{2} (0.386 sq mi or 247 acres) and river estuaries.

Velzic (French pronunciation: [vɛlzik]) is a commune in the Cantal department in south-central France.

== Population ==
Historical population
Year	Pop.	±% p.a.
1968	326	—
1975	371	+1.86%
1982	359	−0.47%
1990	364	+0.17%
1999	378	+0.42%
2007	389	+0.36%
2012	399	+0.51%
2017	430	+1.51%
2023	401	−1.16%
Source: INSEE

== See also ==
- Communes of the Cantal department
