= Badailhac =

Commune in Auvergne-Rhône-Alpes, France

- Commune
- Location of Badailhac
- Location within France Location within Auvergne-Rhône-Alpes
- Coordinates: 44°55′12″N 2°37′32″E
- Country: France
- Region: Auvergne-Rhône-Alpes
- Department: Cantal
- Arrondissement: Aurillac
- Canton: Vic-sur-Cère
- Intercommunality: Cère et Goul en Carladès

Government
  - Mayor (2020–2026): Antoine Grichois
- Area^{1}: 12.48 km^{2} (4.82 sq mi)
- Elevation: 950 m (3,120 ft)
- Highest elevation: 1,023 m (3,356 ft)
- Lowest elevation: 677 m (2,221 ft)
- Population (2023): 129
  - Density: 10.3/km^{2} (26.8/sq mi)
- Time zone: UTC+01:00 (CET)
  - Summer (DST): UTC+02:00 (CEST)
- INSEE/Postal code: 15017 /15800
- ^{1} French Land Register data, which excludes lakes, ponds, glaciers > 1 km^{2} (0.386 sq mi or 247 acres) and river estuaries.

Badailhac (French pronunciation: [badajak]; Occitan: Badalhac) is a commune in the Cantal department in south-central France.

== Population ==
Historical population
Year	Pop.	±% p.a.
1968	224	—
1975	193	−2.11%
1982	160	−2.64%
1990	136	−2.01%
1999	122	−1.20%
2007	116	−0.63%
2012	127	+1.83%
2017	139	+1.82%
2023	129	−1.24%
Source: INSEE

== See also ==
- Communes of the Cantal department
