= Jean-Baptiste Carrier =

French Revolutionary politician (1756–1794)

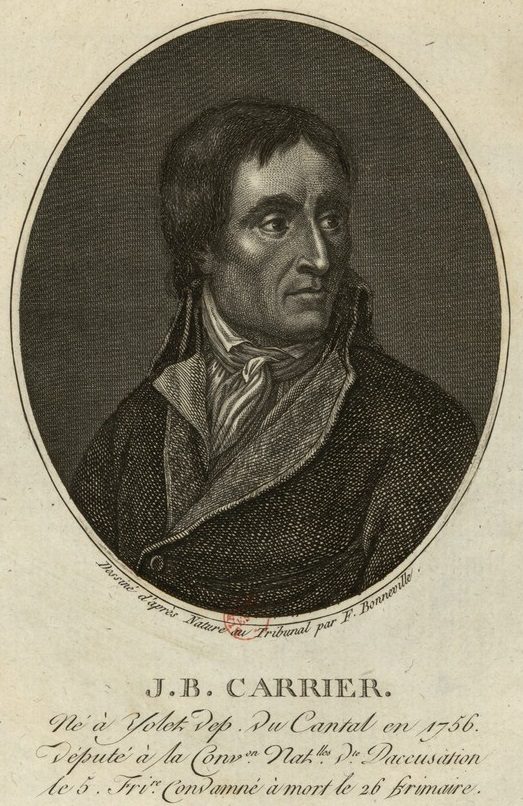
- Carrier portrayed during his trial by François Bonneville

Deputy in the National Convention
- In office 5 September 1792 – 16 December 1794
- Constituency: Cantal

Personal details
- Born: 16 March 1756 Yolet, Kingdom of France
- Died: 16 December 1794 (aged 38) Paris, French Republic
- Cause of death: Execution by guillotine
- Party: The Mountain

Jean-Baptiste Carrier (French pronunciation: [ʒɑ̃ batist kaʁje]; 16 March 1756 – 16 December 1794) was a French Revolutionary, politician and convicted war criminal most notable for his actions in the War in the Vendée during the Reign of Terror. While under orders to suppress a Royalist counter-revolution, he commanded the execution of 4,000 civilians, mainly priests, women and children in Nantes, some by drowning in the river Loire, which Carrier described as "the National Bathtub". After the fall of the Robespierre government, Carrier was tried for war crimes by the Revolutionary Tribunal, found guilty, and executed.

== Early life ==
Carrier was born at Yolet, a village near Aurillac in upper Auvergne, as the fourth of six children born to Jean Carrier and Marguerite Puex. As the son of a middle class tenant farmer, Carrier and his family survived on income reaped from cultivating the land of a French nobleman. After attending a Jesuit school in Aurillac, he was able to pursue a wide variety of career interests. Carrier worked in a law office in Paris until 1785 when he returned to Aurillac, married, and with the outbreak of the Revolution joined the National Guard and the Jacobin Club. In 1790 he was a country attorney (counsellor for the bailliage of Aurillac) and in 1792 was elected deputy to the National Convention for Cantal. He was already known as one of the influential members of the Cordeliers and the Jacobin Club. After the subjugation of Flanders he was one of the commissioners nominated in the close of 1792 by the convention. He voted in favor of the execution of deposed King Louis XVI, was one of the first to call for the arrest of the Duke of Orléans and took a prominent part in the overthrow of the Girondists (on 31 May).

== Representative to Nantes ==
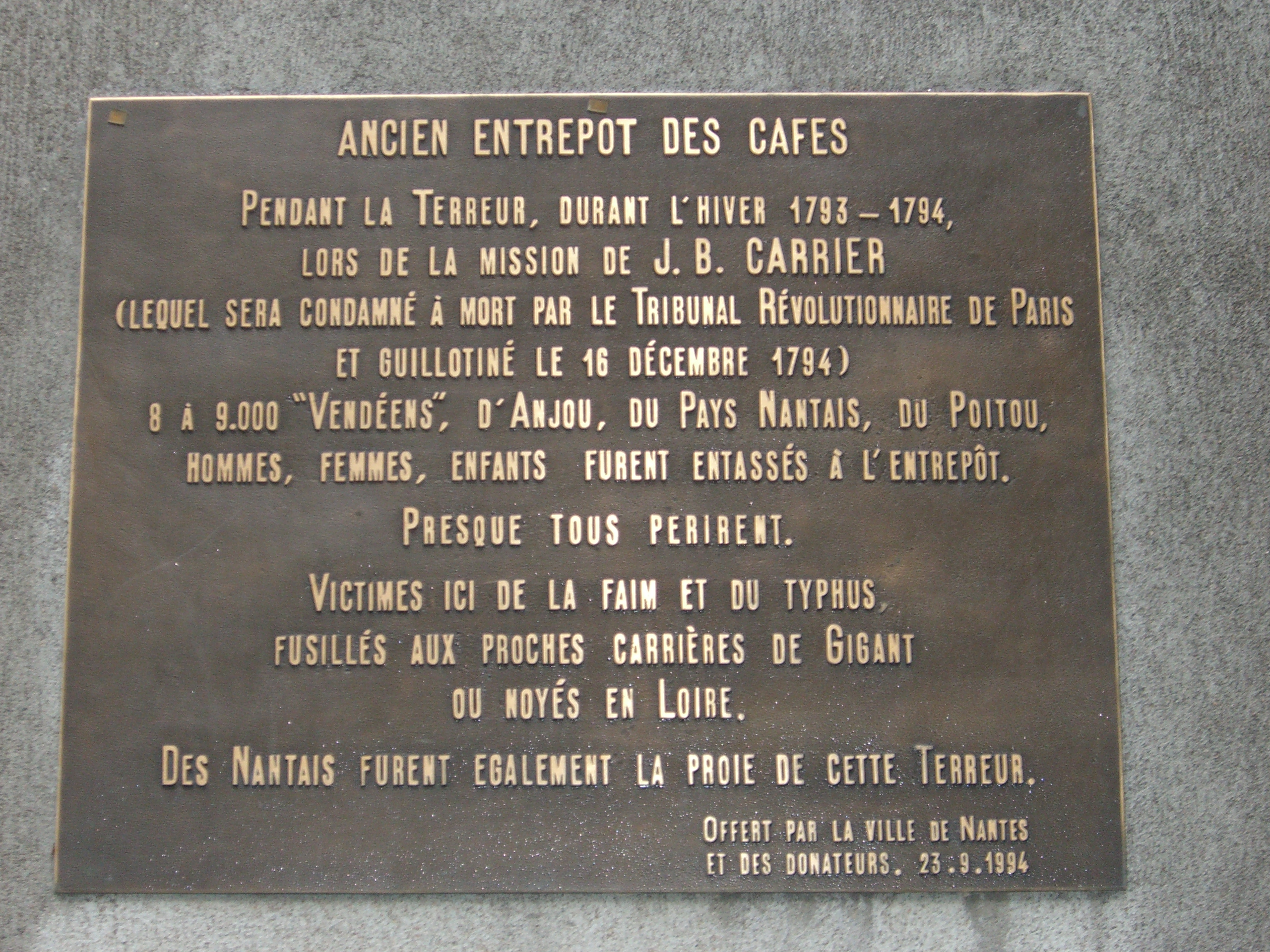
Plaque in Nantes: "Former Coffee Warehouse Jail. During the Terror, during the winter of 1793-1794, at the time of the mission of J.-B. Carrier (who was condemned to death by the Revolutionary Tribunal in Paris and guillotined on 16 December 1794), 8 to 9,000 citizens of the Vendée, Anjou, the Nantes region, and Poitou – men, women, and children – were incarcerated at this jail. Nearly all perished. Victims of starvation and typhus were shot near Gigant quarry or drowned in the Loire river. -- The people of Nantes were equal prey to the Terror."

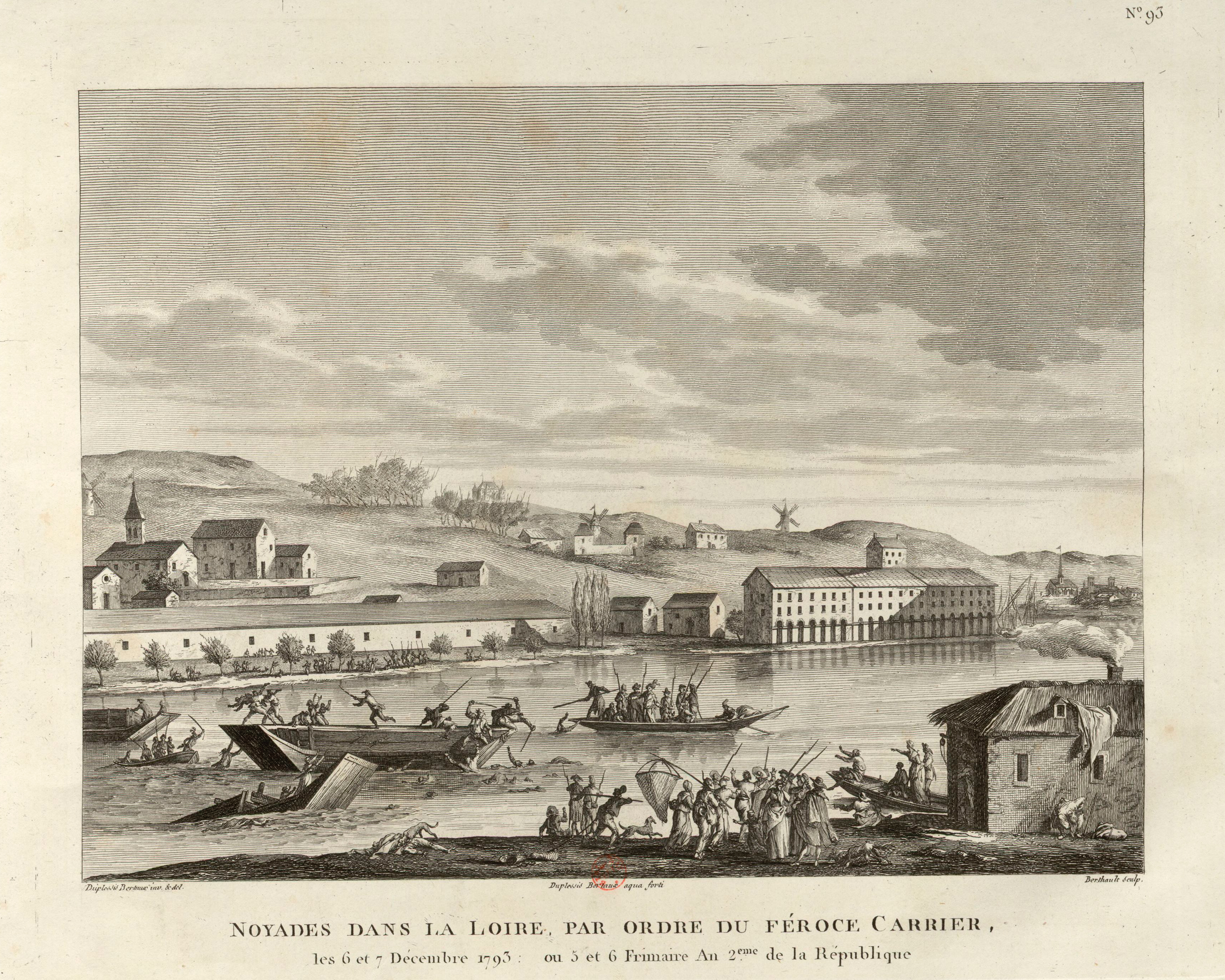
The Drownings at Nantes, engraving after a drawing by Jean Duplessis-Bertaux

In 1793, Carrier was sent to Nantes as a representative on mission under orders from the National Convention. He established a revolutionary tribunal in Nantes and formed a unit of troops called the Legion of Marat, in order to suppress the revolt of anti-revolutionists and dispose quickly of prisoners in the jails. The trials were soon discontinued, and the victims were sent to the guillotine, shot, or executed in another way.

In a twenty-page letter to his fellow republicans, Carrier promised not to leave a single counter-revolutionary or monopolist (hoarders or aristocratic land owners) at large in Nantes. His action was endorsed by the Committee of Public Safety. In the following days Carrier put large numbers of prisoners aboard vessels with trap doors for bottoms, and sank them in the Loire river. These executions included priests and nuns, as well as women and children. They were known as the Drownings at Nantes. Some alleged that Carrier ordered young male and female prisoners be tied together naked before the drownings, a method which was called a "republican marriage", but this accusation was later found to be a rumor started by counter-revolutionaries.

He was described by Adolphe Thiers as being "one of those inferior and violent spirits, who in the excitement of civil wars become monsters of cruelty and extravagance."

== Trial and execution ==
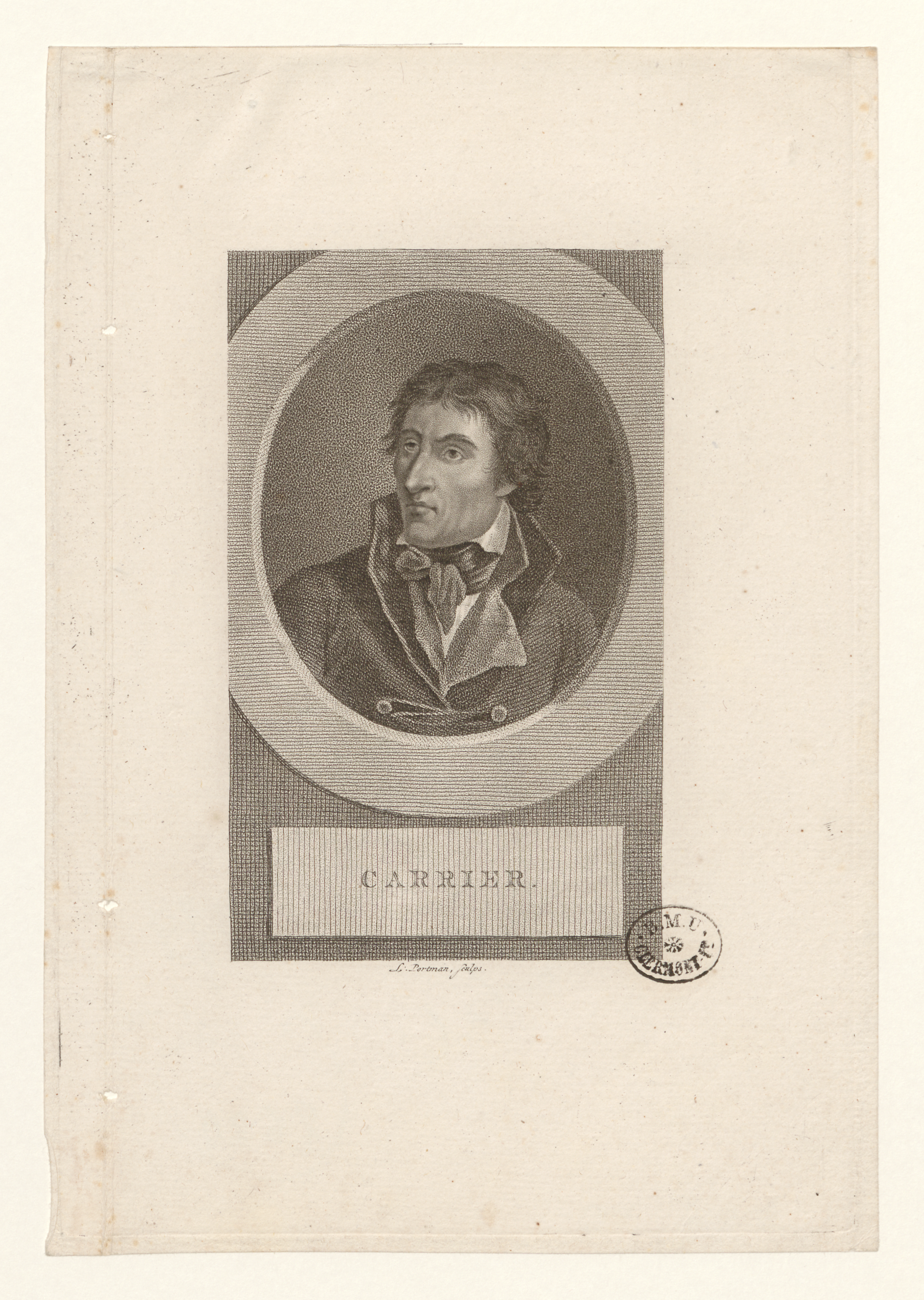
BOYER 483 - Carrier

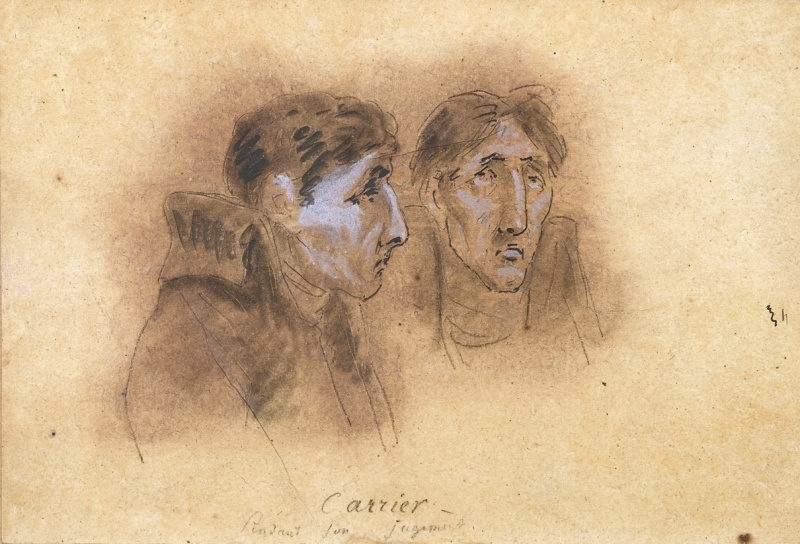
Sketch of Carrier during his trial, by Vivant Denon

In 1794, a member of the Committee of Public Safety returned from Nantes with information about the atrocities being carried out, although Carrier himself was not put on trial. On 8 February 1794, Carrier was recalled to Paris by Robespierre. A few months later, the Thermidorian reaction led to the fall of Robespierre and the Committee of Public Safety. Carrier's position became exposed. Prisoners he had brought from Nantes were acquitted and released, and more people denounced Carrier's actions. On 3 September 1794 Carrier was arrested.

At his trial before the Revolutionary Tribunal, Carrier was quick to denounce allegations of inhumanity, stating "I took but little share in the policing of Nantes; I was only there in passing, being first at Rennes and later with the army. My principal task was to watch over and see to the victualing of our troops, and for six months I supplied 200,000 men there without its costing the State a halfpenny. Hence I have little information to offer in the matter. I know little or nothing of the accused." After this statement, a fellow representative, Phélippes, vocally charged Carrier with drownings, wholesale executions, demolitions, thefts, pillaging, laying waste to Nantes, famine and disorder, and the butchering of women and children. Men from the "Marat Company", a militia that Carrier used to purge Nantes, were present during the trial, including Perro-Chaux, Lévêque, Bollogniel, Grandmaison, and Mainguet. All were part of the Revolutionary Committee of Nantes, appointed directly or indirectly by Carrier. The jury passed a unanimous vote for Carrier's execution.

The Revolutionary Tribunal declared him guilty of, among other crimes, mass executions of citizens who did not fight against the Republic, through drownings and firing squads. They declared these executions to have been carried out "knowingly, viciously, and with counter-revolutionary intent." Along with two accomplices from the revolutionary committee of Nantes, Carrier was executed by the guillotine in Paris, on 16 December 1794.

== Bibliography ==
- Carrier, Jean-Baptiste, Correspondence of Jean-Baptiste Carrier: people's representative to the Convention during his mission in Brittany, 1793-1794, Nantes: John Lane Company, 1920, Google Books, downloadable eBook.
- Hanson, Paul R. Historical Dictionary of the French Revolution. France: Scarecrow Press, 2004.
- Joes, Anthony James. Guerilla Conflict before the cold war. Westport: Greenwood Publishing Group, 1996.
- Lenotre, G. The French Revolution in Brittany. Edinburgh: Ballantyne, Hanson & Co, 1912.
- Lenotre, G. Tragic Episodes of the French Revolution in Brittany, With Unpublished Documents. Trans. H. Havelock. London: David Nutt, 1912.
- Stephens, Henry Morse. A History of the French Revolution. Vol. 3. New York: Charles Scribner's Sons, 1891.
- Thiers, Adolphe and Frederic Shoberl. The History of the French Revolution. Vol. 3. New York: D. Appleton & Co, 1866.
- Webster, Noah. Webster's New Universal Unabridged Dictionary. Vol. 2. New York: Simon & Schuster, 1983.
