= Saint-Jacques-des-Blats =

Commune in Auvergne-Rhône-Alpes, France

Saint-Jacques des Blats
- Commune
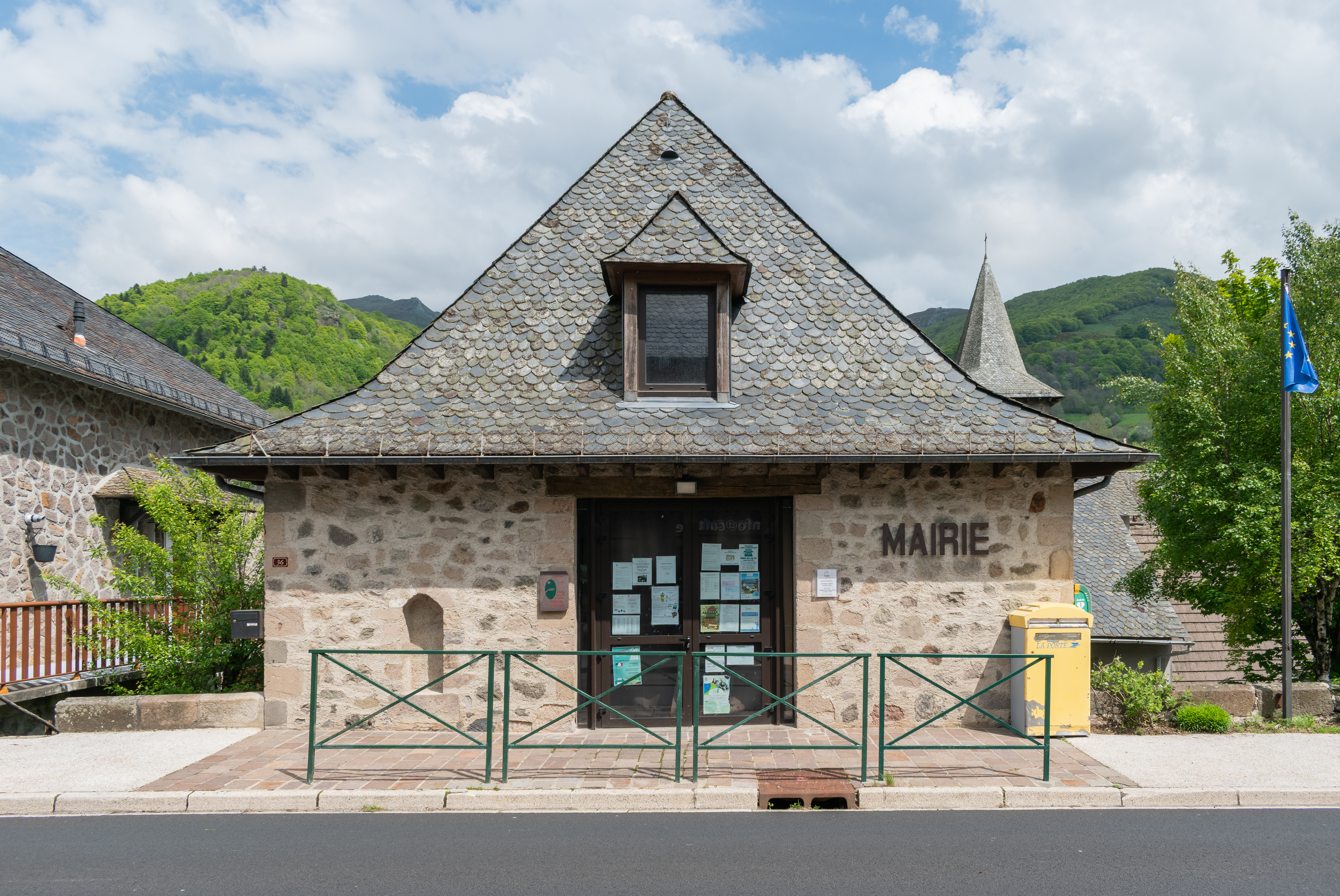
- The town hall in Saint-Jacques-des-Blats
- Location of Saint-Jacques des Blats
- Location within France Location within Auvergne-Rhône-Alpes
- Coordinates: 45°03′10″N 2°42′40″E
- Country: France
- Region: Auvergne-Rhône-Alpes
- Department: Cantal
- Arrondissement: Aurillac
- Canton: Vic-sur-Cère
- Intercommunality: Cère et Goul en Carladès

Government
  - Mayor (2020–2026): Linda Benard
- Area^{1}: 31.48 km^{2} (12.15 sq mi)
- Elevation: 990 m (3,250 ft)
- Highest elevation: 1,855 m (6,086 ft)
- Lowest elevation: 800 m (2,600 ft)
- Population (2023): 305
  - Density: 9.69/km^{2} (25.1/sq mi)
- Time zone: UTC+01:00 (CET)
  - Summer (DST): UTC+02:00 (CEST)
- INSEE/Postal code: 15192 /15800
- ^{1} French Land Register data, which excludes lakes, ponds, glaciers > 1 km^{2} (0.386 sq mi or 247 acres) and river estuaries.

Saint-Jacques-des-Blats (French pronunciation: [sɛ̃ ʒak de bla]; Auvergnat: Sant Jaume dels Blats) is a commune in the Cantal department in south-central France.

== Population ==
Historical population
Year	Pop.	±% p.a.
1968	459	—
1975	395	−2.12%
1982	387	−0.29%
1990	352	−1.18%
1999	325	−0.88%
2007	319	−0.23%
2012	325	+0.37%
2017	330	+0.31%
2023	305	−1.30%
Source: INSEE

== See also ==
- Communes of the Cantal department
