= Canton of Vic-sur-Cère =

Coordinates: 44.98°N 2.62°E

- Canton
- Situation of the canton of Vic-sur-Cère in the department of Cantal
- Country: France
- Region: Auvergne-Rhône-Alpes
- Department: Cantal
- No. of communes: {{{nbcomm}}}
- Population (2023): 11,120
- INSEE code: 1514

The canton of Vic-sur-Cère is an administrative division of the Cantal department, southern France. Its borders were modified at the French canton reorganisation which came into effect in March 2015. Its seat is in Vic-sur-Cère.

It consists of the following communes:

1. Badailhac
2. Carlat
3. Cros-de-Ronesque
4. Giou-de-Mamou
5. Jou-sous-Monjou
6. Labrousse
7. Lascelle
8. Mandailles-Saint-Julien
9. Pailherols
10. Polminhac
11. Raulhac
12. Saint-Cirgues-de-Jordanne
13. Saint-Clément
14. Saint-Étienne-de-Carlat
15. Saint-Jacques-des-Blats
16. Saint-Simon
17. Teissières-lès-Bouliès
18. Thiézac
19. Velzic
20. Vézac
21. Vezels-Roussy
22. Vic-sur-Cère
23. Yolet
