= Pailherols =

Commune in Auvergne-Rhône-Alpes, France

- Commune
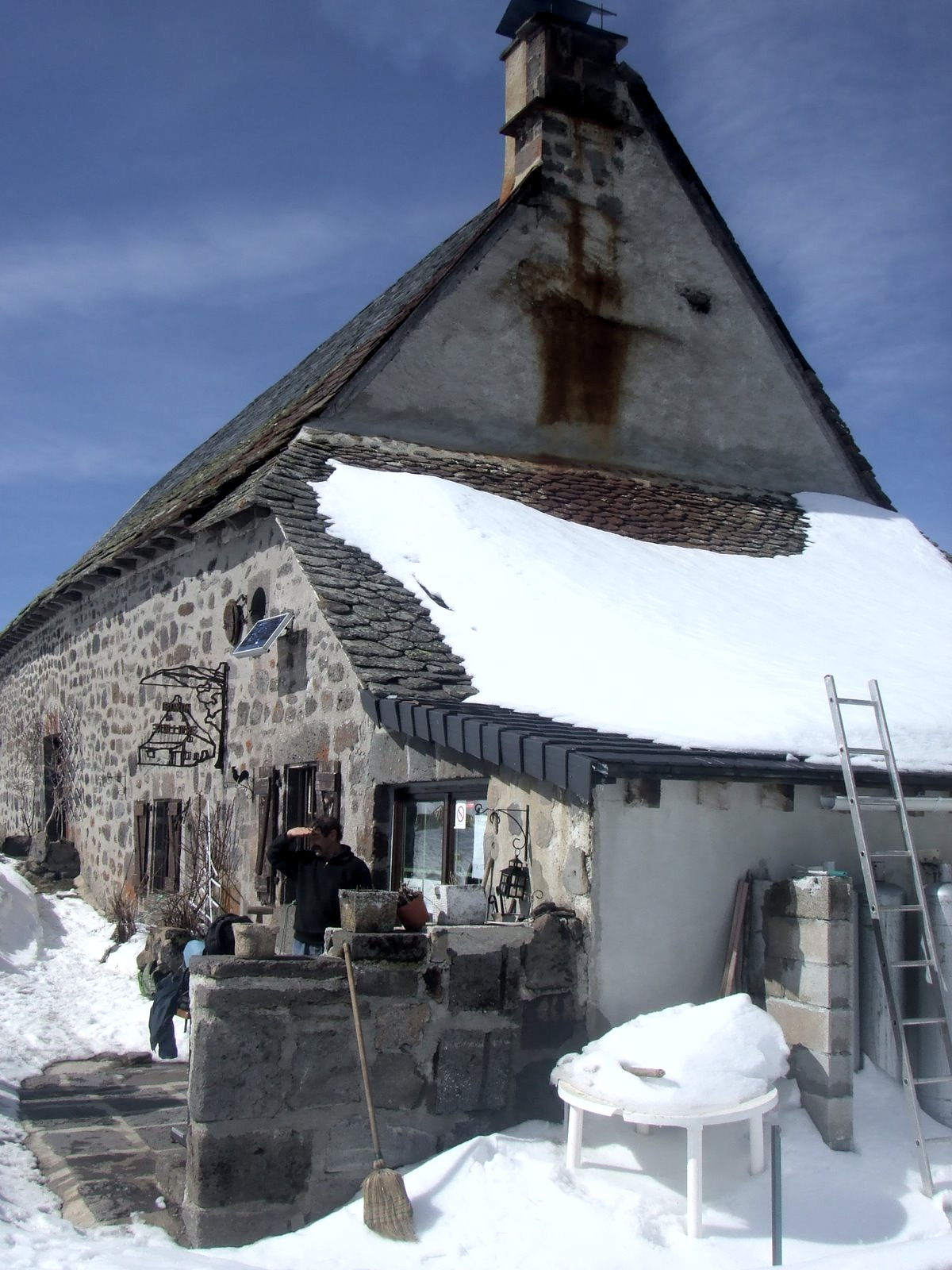
- The La Thuilière cheesemaking building, in Pailherols
- Location of Pailherols
- Location within France Location within Auvergne-Rhône-Alpes
- Coordinates: 44°57′06″N 2°41′06″E
- Country: France
- Region: Auvergne-Rhône-Alpes
- Department: Cantal
- Arrondissement: Aurillac
- Canton: Vic-sur-Cère
- Intercommunality: Cère et Goul en Carladès

Government
  - Mayor (2020–2026): Claude Prunet
- Area^{1}: 25.98 km^{2} (10.03 sq mi)
- Elevation: 1,060 m (3,480 ft)
- Highest elevation: 1,632 m (5,354 ft)
- Lowest elevation: 807 m (2,648 ft)
- Population (2023): 143
  - Density: 5.50/km^{2} (14.3/sq mi)
- Time zone: UTC+01:00 (CET)
  - Summer (DST): UTC+02:00 (CEST)
- INSEE/Postal code: 15146 /15800
- ^{1} French Land Register data, which excludes lakes, ponds, glaciers > 1 km^{2} (0.386 sq mi or 247 acres) and river estuaries.

Pailherols is a commune in the Cantal department in south-central France.

== Population ==
Historical population
Year	Pop.	±% p.a.
1968	301	—
1975	213	−4.82%
1982	195	−1.25%
1990	171	−1.63%
1999	153	−1.23%
2007	167	+1.10%
2012	137	−3.88%
2017	127	−1.50%
2023	143	+2.00%
Source: INSEE

== See also ==
- Communes of the Cantal department
