= Cassaniouze =

Commune in Auvergne-Rhône-Alpes, France

- Commune
- Location of Cassaniouze
- Location within France Location within Auvergne-Rhône-Alpes
- Coordinates: 44°41′29″N 2°23′04″E
- Country: France
- Region: Auvergne-Rhône-Alpes
- Department: Cantal
- Arrondissement: Aurillac
- Canton: Arpajon-sur-Cère

Government
  - Mayor (2020–2026): Michel Castanier
- Area^{1}: 35.84 km^{2} (13.84 sq mi)
- Elevation: 550 m (1,800 ft)
- Highest elevation: 688 m (2,257 ft)
- Lowest elevation: 180 m (590 ft)
- Population (2023): 505
  - Density: 14.1/km^{2} (36.5/sq mi)
- Time zone: UTC+01:00 (CET)
  - Summer (DST): UTC+02:00 (CEST)
- INSEE/Postal code: 15029 /15340
- ^{1} French Land Register data, which excludes lakes, ponds, glaciers > 1 km^{2} (0.386 sq mi or 247 acres) and river estuaries.

Cassaniouze (French pronunciation: [kasanjuz]; Occitan: Cassanhosa) is a commune in the département of Cantal in south-central France.

== Population ==
Historical population
Year	Pop.	±% p.a.
1968	809	—
1975	719	−1.67%
1982	684	−0.71%
1990	587	−1.89%
1999	547	−0.78%
2007	517	−0.70%
2012	513	−0.16%
2017	528	+0.58%
2023	505	−0.74%
Source: INSEE

== See also ==
- Communes of the Cantal department
