= Leucamp =

Commune in Auvergne-Rhône-Alpes, France

- Commune
- Location of Leucamp
- Location within France Location within Auvergne-Rhône-Alpes
- Coordinates: 44°46′46″N 2°31′59″E
- Country: France
- Region: Auvergne-Rhône-Alpes
- Department: Cantal
- Arrondissement: Aurillac
- Canton: Arpajon-sur-Cère
- Intercommunality: Châtaigneraie Cantalienne

Government
  - Mayor (2020–2026): Annie Plantecoste
- Area^{1}: 13.5 km^{2} (5.2 sq mi)
- Elevation: 635 m (2,083 ft)
- Highest elevation: 758 m (2,487 ft)
- Lowest elevation: 349 m (1,145 ft)
- Population (2023): 244
  - Density: 18.1/km^{2} (46.8/sq mi)
- Time zone: UTC+01:00 (CET)
  - Summer (DST): UTC+02:00 (CEST)
- INSEE/Postal code: 15103 /15120
- ^{1} French Land Register data, which excludes lakes, ponds, glaciers > 1 km^{2} (0.386 sq mi or 247 acres) and river estuaries.

Leucamp (French pronunciation: [løkɑ̃]; Occitan: Leucam) is a commune in the Cantal department in south-central France, in the Auvergne-Rhône-Alpes region.

== Population ==
Historical population
Year	Pop.	±% p.a.
1968	312	—
1975	292	−0.94%
1982	280	−0.60%
1990	263	−0.78%
1999	237	−1.15%
2007	236	−0.05%
2012	235	−0.08%
2017	234	−0.09%
2023	244	+0.70%
Source: INSEE

== See also ==
- Communes of the Cantal department
