= Sansac-Veinazès =

Commune in Auvergne-Rhône-Alpes, France

- Commune
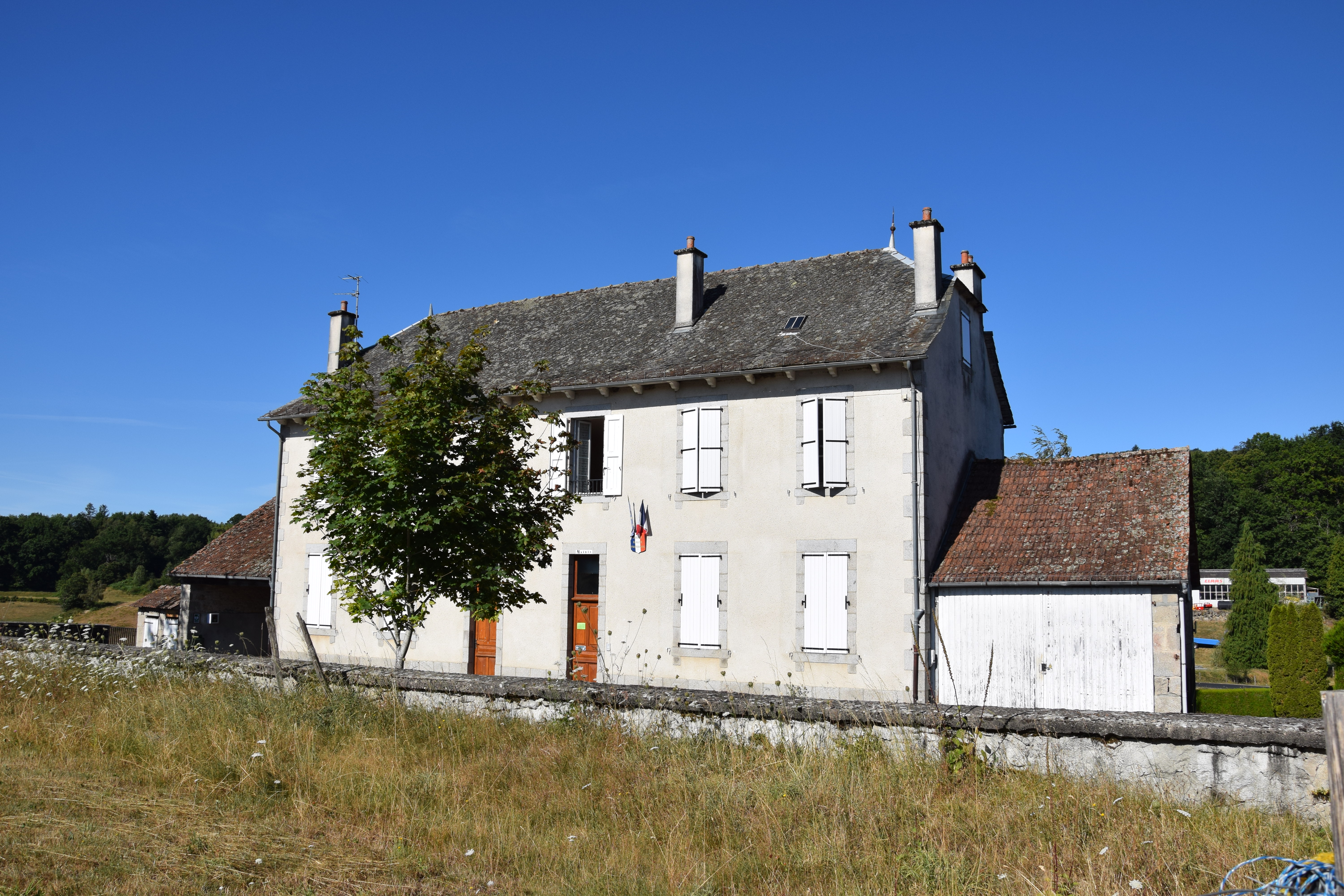
- Town hall
- Location of Sansac-Veinazès
- Location within France Location within Auvergne-Rhône-Alpes
- Coordinates: 44°44′32″N 2°26′47″E
- Country: France
- Region: Auvergne-Rhône-Alpes
- Department: Cantal
- Arrondissement: Aurillac
- Canton: Arpajon-sur-Cère

Government
  - Mayor (2021–2026): Françoise Angelvy
- Area^{1}: 12.56 km^{2} (4.85 sq mi)
- Elevation: 590 m (1,940 ft)
- Highest elevation: 807 m (2,648 ft)
- Lowest elevation: 530 m (1,740 ft)
- Population (2023): 199
  - Density: 15.8/km^{2} (41.0/sq mi)
- Time zone: UTC+01:00 (CET)
  - Summer (DST): UTC+02:00 (CEST)
- INSEE/Postal code: 15222 /15120
- ^{1} French Land Register data, which excludes lakes, ponds, glaciers > 1 km^{2} (0.386 sq mi or 247 acres) and river estuaries.

Sansac-Veinazès (French pronunciation: [sɑ̃sak vɛnazɛs]; Occitan: Sansac de Veinasés) is a commune in the Cantal department in south-central France.

== Population ==
Historical population
Year	Pop.	±% p.a.
1968	247	—
1975	228	−1.14%
1982	209	−1.24%
1990	202	−0.42%
1999	211	+0.49%
2007	200	−0.67%
2012	222	+2.11%
2017	216	−0.55%
2023	199	−1.36%
Source: INSEE

== See also ==
- Communes of the Cantal department
