= Cros-de-Ronesque =

Commune in Auvergne-Rhône-Alpes, France

- Commune
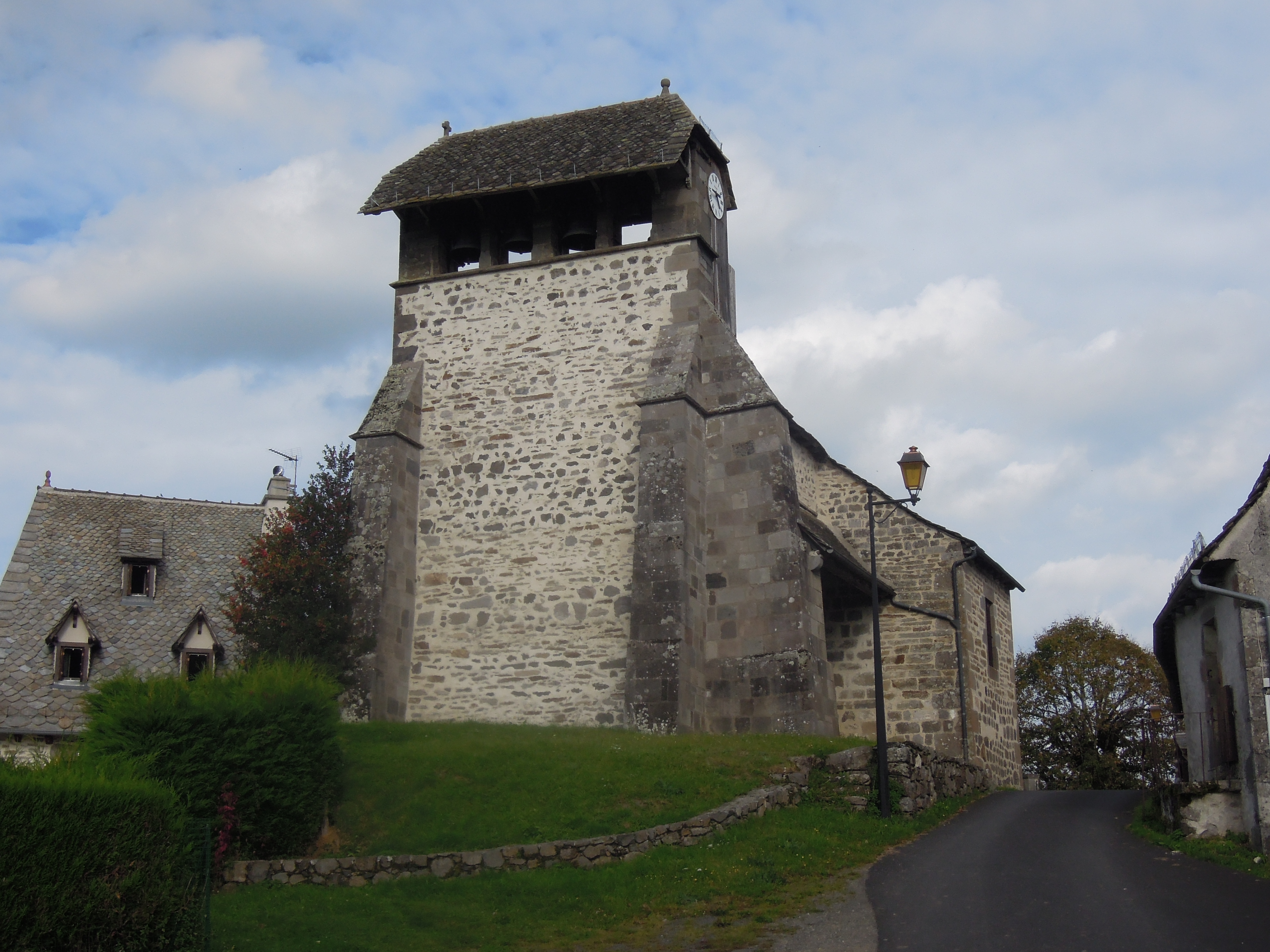
- The church of Saint-Hilaire
- Location of Cros-de-Ronesque
- Location within France Location within Auvergne-Rhône-Alpes
- Coordinates: 44°52′23″N 2°36′41″E
- Country: France
- Region: Auvergne-Rhône-Alpes
- Department: Cantal
- Arrondissement: Aurillac
- Canton: Vic-sur-Cère
- Intercommunality: Cère et Goul en Carladès

Government
  - Mayor (2020–2026): Jean-Baptiste Brunhes
- Area^{1}: 16.23 km^{2} (6.27 sq mi)
- Elevation: 650 m (2,130 ft)
- Highest elevation: 871 m (2,858 ft)
- Lowest elevation: 440 m (1,440 ft)
- Population (2023): 145
  - Density: 8.93/km^{2} (23.1/sq mi)
- Time zone: UTC+01:00 (CET)
  - Summer (DST): UTC+02:00 (CEST)
- INSEE/Postal code: 15058 /15130
- ^{1} French Land Register data, which excludes lakes, ponds, glaciers > 1 km^{2} (0.386 sq mi or 247 acres) and river estuaries.

Cros-de-Ronesque (Occitan: Cros de Ronesc) is a commune in the Cantal department in south-central France.

== Population ==
Historical population
Year	Pop.	±% p.a.
1968	318	—
1975	247	−3.55%
1982	200	−2.97%
1990	166	−2.30%
1999	137	−2.11%
2007	125	−1.14%
2012	136	+1.70%
2017	143	+1.01%
2023	145	+0.23%
Source: INSEE

== See also ==
- Communes of the Cantal department
