= Vezels-Roussy =

Commune in Auvergne-Rhône-Alpes, France

- Commune
- Location of Vezels-Roussy
- Location within France Location within Auvergne-Rhône-Alpes
- Coordinates: 44°48′35″N 2°35′10″E
- Country: France
- Region: Auvergne-Rhône-Alpes
- Department: Cantal
- Arrondissement: Aurillac
- Canton: Vic-sur-Cère
- Intercommunality: CA Aurillac Agglomération

Government
  - Mayor (2020–2026): Jean-Luc Tourlan
- Area^{1}: 12.87 km^{2} (4.97 sq mi)
- Elevation: 730 m (2,400 ft)
- Highest elevation: 764 m (2,507 ft)
- Lowest elevation: 371 m (1,217 ft)
- Population (2023): 132
  - Density: 10.3/km^{2} (26.6/sq mi)
- Time zone: UTC+01:00 (CET)
  - Summer (DST): UTC+02:00 (CEST)
- INSEE/Postal code: 15257 /15130
- ^{1} French Land Register data, which excludes lakes, ponds, glaciers > 1 km^{2} (0.386 sq mi or 247 acres) and river estuaries.

Vezels-Roussy is a commune in the Cantal department in south-central France.

== Population ==
Historical population
| Year | Pop. | ±% p.a. |
|---|---|---|
| 1968 | 203 | — |
| 1975 | 149 | −4.32% |
| 1982 | 124 | −2.59% |
| 1990 | 120 | −0.41% |
| 1999 | 143 | +1.97% |
| 2007 | 155 | +1.01% |
| 2012 | 144 | −1.46% |
| 2017 | 130 | −2.02% |
| 2023 | 132 | +0.25% |
Source: INSEE

== See also ==
- Communes of the Cantal department
