= Ladinhac =

Commune in Auvergne-Rhône-Alpes, France

- Commune
- Location of Ladinhac
- Location within France Location within Auvergne-Rhône-Alpes
- Coordinates: 44°45′21″N 2°30′33″E
- Country: France
- Region: Auvergne-Rhône-Alpes
- Department: Cantal
- Arrondissement: Aurillac
- Canton: Arpajon-sur-Cère
- Intercommunality: Châtaigneraie Cantalienne

Government
  - Mayor (2020–2026): Clément Rouet
- Area^{1}: 26.72 km^{2} (10.32 sq mi)
- Elevation: 630 m (2,070 ft)
- Highest elevation: 794 m (2,605 ft)
- Lowest elevation: 320 m (1,050 ft)
- Population (2023): 434
  - Density: 16.2/km^{2} (42.1/sq mi)
- Time zone: UTC+01:00 (CET)
  - Summer (DST): UTC+02:00 (CEST)
- INSEE/Postal code: 15089 /15120
- ^{1} French Land Register data, which excludes lakes, ponds, glaciers > 1 km^{2} (0.386 sq mi or 247 acres) and river estuaries.

Ladinhac (French pronunciation: [ladiɲak]) is a commune in the Cantal department in south-central France.

== Population ==
Historical population
Year	Pop.	±% p.a.
1968	603	—
1975	555	−1.18%
1982	523	−0.84%
1990	510	−0.31%
1999	465	−1.02%
2007	481	+0.42%
2012	512	+1.26%
2017	458	−2.20%
2023	434	−0.89%
Source: INSEE

== See also ==
- Communes of the Cantal department
