= Lapeyrugue =

Commune in Auvergne-Rhône-Alpes, France

- Commune
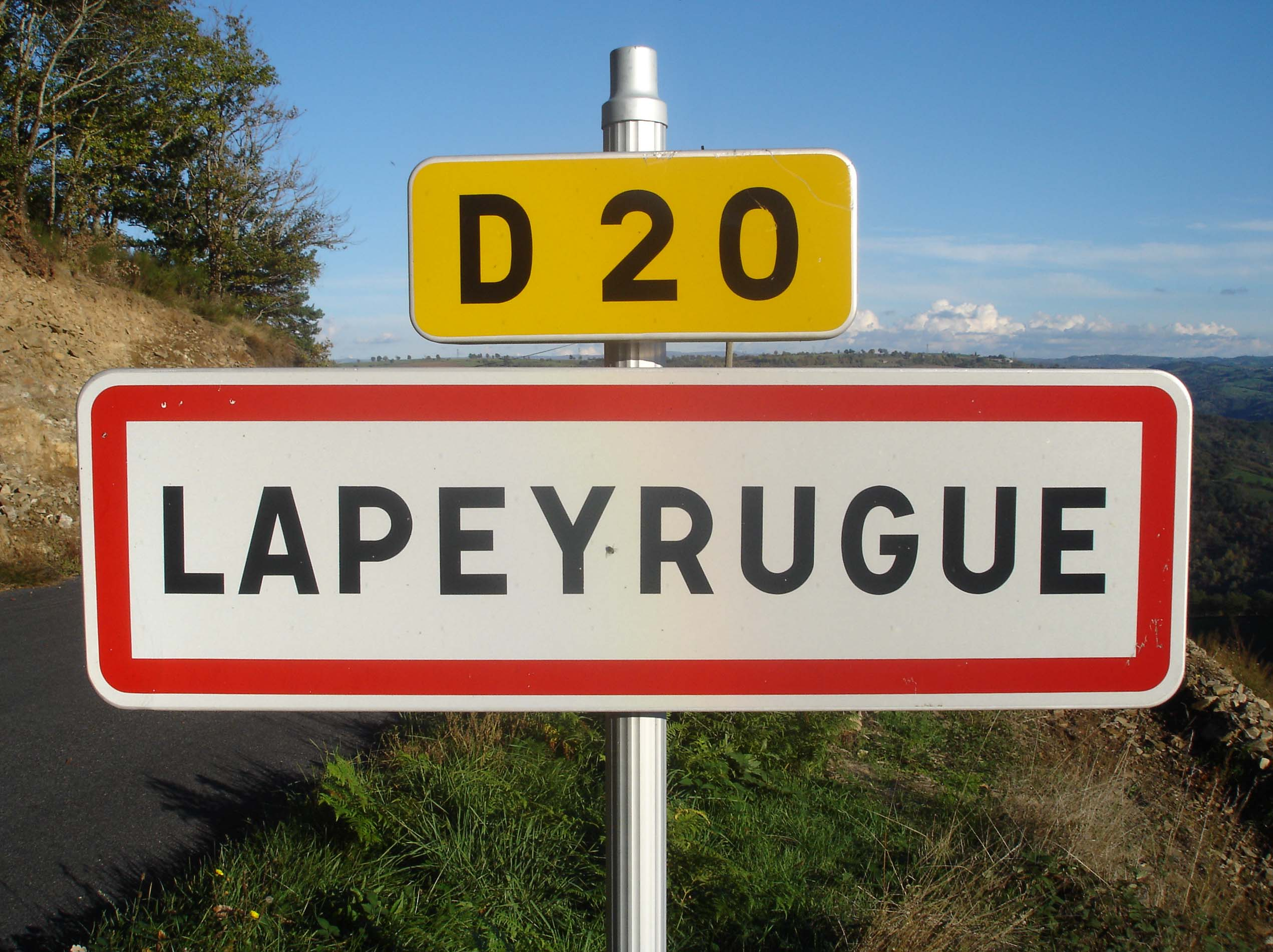
- A road sign entering Lapeyrugue
- Location of Lapeyrugue
- Location within France Location within Auvergne-Rhône-Alpes
- Coordinates: 44°43′46″N 2°32′38″E
- Country: France
- Region: Auvergne-Rhône-Alpes
- Department: Cantal
- Arrondissement: Aurillac
- Canton: Arpajon-sur-Cère

Government
  - Mayor (2020–2026): Colette Froment
- Area^{1}: 8.47 km^{2} (3.27 sq mi)
- Elevation: 600 m (2,000 ft)
- Highest elevation: 735 m (2,411 ft)
- Lowest elevation: 272 m (892 ft)
- Population (2023): 90
  - Density: 11/km^{2} (28/sq mi)
- Time zone: UTC+01:00 (CET)
  - Summer (DST): UTC+02:00 (CEST)
- INSEE/Postal code: 15093 /15120
- ^{1} French Land Register data, which excludes lakes, ponds, glaciers > 1 km^{2} (0.386 sq mi or 247 acres) and river estuaries.

Lapeyrugue (French pronunciation: [lapeʁyɡ]; Occitan: La Peiruga) is a commune in the Cantal department in south-central France.

== Population ==
Historical population
Year	Pop.	±% p.a.
1968	173	—
1975	164	−0.76%
1982	167	+0.26%
1990	141	−2.09%
1999	128	−1.07%
2007	107	−2.22%
2012	107	+0.00%
2017	103	−0.76%
2023	90	−2.22%
Source: INSEE

== See also ==
- Communes of the Cantal department
