= Vic-sur-Cère =

Commune in Auvergne-Rhône-Alpes, France

- Commune
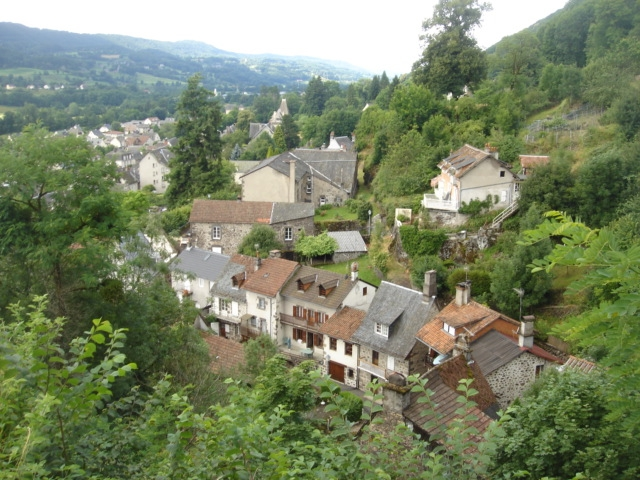
- A general view of Vic-sur-Cère

- Coat of arms
- Location of Vic-sur-Cère
- Location within France Location within Auvergne-Rhône-Alpes
- Coordinates: 44°58′50″N 2°37′33″E
- Country: France
- Region: Auvergne-Rhône-Alpes
- Department: Cantal
- Arrondissement: Aurillac
- Canton: Vic-sur-Cère
- Intercommunality: Cère et Goul en Carladès

Government
  - Mayor (2020–2026): Annie Delrieu-Tourtoulou
- Area^{1}: 29.37 km^{2} (11.34 sq mi)
- Highest elevation: 1,262 m (4,140 ft)
- Lowest elevation: 652 m (2,139 ft)
- Population (2023): 1,905
  - Density: 64.86/km^{2} (168.0/sq mi)
- Time zone: UTC+01:00 (CET)
  - Summer (DST): UTC+02:00 (CEST)
- INSEE/Postal code: 15258 /15800
- ^{1} French Land Register data, which excludes lakes, ponds, glaciers > 1 km^{2} (0.386 sq mi or 247 acres) and river estuaries.

Vic-sur-Cère (French pronunciation: [vik syʁ sɛʁ], lit. 'Vic on Cère'; Auvergnat: Vic de Cera or Vic de Carladés) is a commune in the Cantal department in south-central France.

== Population ==
Historical population
| Year | Pop. | ±% p.a. |
|---|---|---|
| 1968 | 1,782 | — |
| 1975 | 1,963 | +1.39% |
| 1982 | 2,066 | +0.73% |
| 1990 | 1,968 | −0.61% |
| 1999 | 1,890 | −0.45% |
| 2007 | 1,960 | +0.46% |
| 2012 | 1,974 | +0.14% |
| 2017 | 1,828 | −1.53% |
| 2023 | 1,905 | +0.69% |
Source: INSEE

== See also ==
- Communes of the Cantal department
