= Labrousse, Cantal =

Commune in Auvergne-Rhône-Alpes, France

Labrousse
- Commune
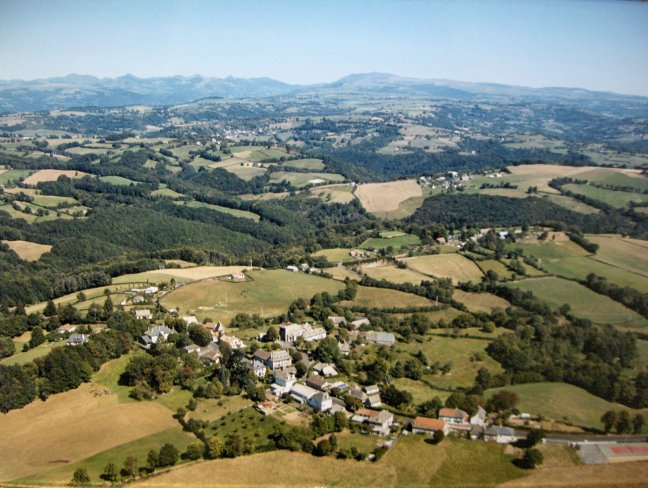
- An aerial view of Labrousse
- Location of Labrousse
- Location within France Location within Auvergne-Rhône-Alpes
- Coordinates: 44°51′26″N 2°32′34″E
- Country: France
- Region: Auvergne-Rhône-Alpes
- Department: Cantal
- Arrondissement: Aurillac
- Canton: Vic-sur-Cère
- Intercommunality: CA Aurillac Agglomération

Government
  - Mayor (2020–2026): Gérard Pradal
- Area^{1}: 19.86 km^{2} (7.67 sq mi)
- Elevation: 800 m (2,600 ft)
- Highest elevation: 850 m (2,790 ft)
- Lowest elevation: 467 m (1,532 ft)
- Population (2023): 478
  - Density: 24.1/km^{2} (62.3/sq mi)
- Time zone: UTC+01:00 (CET)
  - Summer (DST): UTC+02:00 (CEST)
- INSEE/Postal code: 15085 /15130
- ^{1} French Land Register data, which excludes lakes, ponds, glaciers > 1 km^{2} (0.386 sq mi or 247 acres) and river estuaries.

Labrousse (French pronunciation: [labʁus]; Occitan: La Brossa) is a commune in the Cantal department in south-central France.

== Population ==
Historical population
Year	Pop.	±% p.a.
1968	395	—
1975	397	+0.07%
1982	445	+1.64%
1990	432	−0.37%
1999	379	−1.44%
2007	374	−0.17%
2012	431	+2.88%
2017	512	+3.50%
2023	478	−1.14%
Source: INSEE

== See also ==
- Communes of the Cantal department
