= Raulhac =

Commune in Auvergne-Rhône-Alpes, France

- Commune
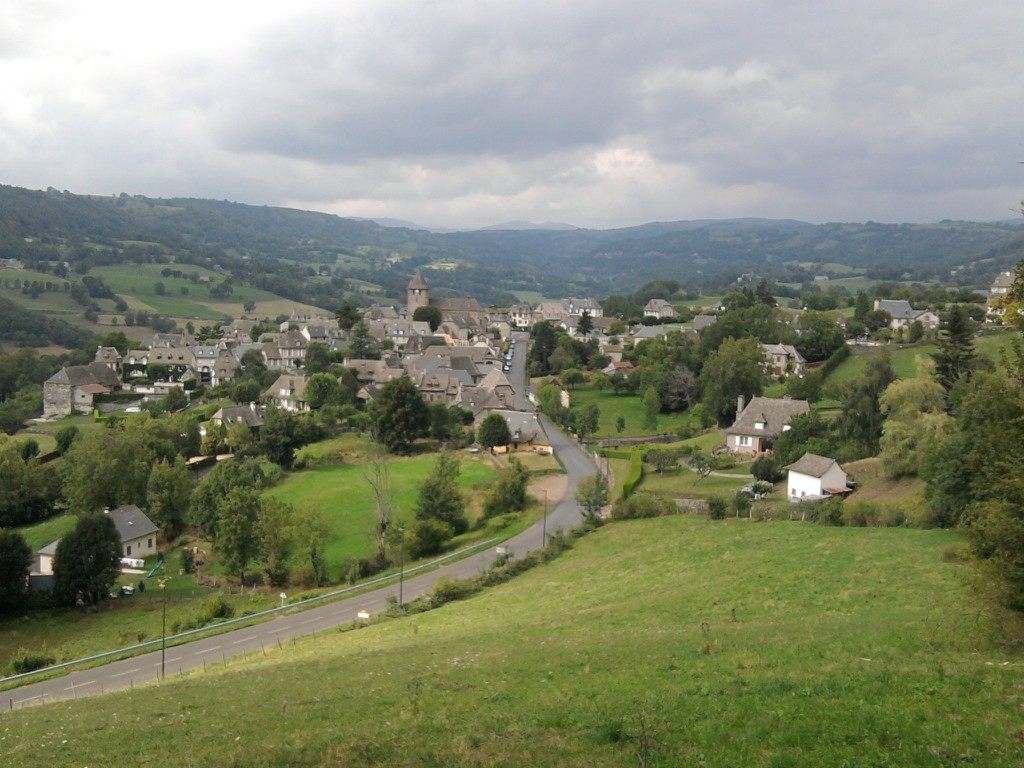
- A general view of Raulhac

- Coat of arms
- Location of Raulhac
- Location within France Location within Auvergne-Rhône-Alpes
- Coordinates: 44°54′01″N 2°39′25″E
- Country: France
- Region: Auvergne-Rhône-Alpes
- Department: Cantal
- Arrondissement: Aurillac
- Canton: Vic-sur-Cère
- Intercommunality: Cère et Goul en Carladès

Government
  - Mayor (2020–2026): Philippe Matiere
- Area^{1}: 16.98 km^{2} (6.56 sq mi)
- Elevation: 740 m (2,430 ft)
- Highest elevation: 995 m (3,264 ft)
- Lowest elevation: 539 m (1,768 ft)
- Population (2023): 274
  - Density: 16.1/km^{2} (41.8/sq mi)
- Time zone: UTC+01:00 (CET)
  - Summer (DST): UTC+02:00 (CEST)
- INSEE/Postal code: 15159 /15800
- ^{1} French Land Register data, which excludes lakes, ponds, glaciers > 1 km^{2} (0.386 sq mi or 247 acres) and river estuaries.

Raulhac is a commune in the Cantal department in south-central France.

== Population ==
Historical population
| Year | Pop. | ±% p.a. |
|---|---|---|
| 1968 | 448 | — |
| 1975 | 386 | −2.11% |
| 1982 | 350 | −1.39% |
| 1990 | 364 | +0.49% |
| 1999 | 332 | −1.02% |
| 2007 | 349 | +0.63% |
| 2012 | 302 | −2.85% |
| 2017 | 272 | −2.07% |
| 2023 | 274 | +0.12% |
Source: INSEE

== See also ==
- Communes of the Cantal department
