= Jou-sous-Monjou =

Commune in Auvergne-Rhône-Alpes, France

- Commune
- Location of Jou-sous-Monjou
- Location within France Location within Auvergne-Rhône-Alpes
- Coordinates: 44°56′20″N 2°39′56″E
- Country: France
- Region: Auvergne-Rhône-Alpes
- Department: Cantal
- Arrondissement: Aurillac
- Canton: Vic-sur-Cère
- Intercommunality: Cère et Goul en Carladès

Government
  - Mayor (2023–2026): Thierry Rougé
- Area^{1}: 6.16 km^{2} (2.38 sq mi)
- Elevation: 759 m (2,490 ft)
- Highest elevation: 1,056 m (3,465 ft)
- Lowest elevation: 694 m (2,277 ft)
- Population (2023): 112
  - Density: 18.2/km^{2} (47.1/sq mi)
- Time zone: UTC+01:00 (CET)
  - Summer (DST): UTC+02:00 (CEST)
- INSEE/Postal code: 15081 /15800
- ^{1} French Land Register data, which excludes lakes, ponds, glaciers > 1 km^{2} (0.386 sq mi or 247 acres) and river estuaries.

Jou-sous-Monjou (French pronunciation: [ʒu su mɔ̃ʒu]; Occitan: Jòu de Monjòu) is a commune in the Cantal department in south-central France. It is 25 km east of Aurillac.

== Population ==
Historical population
Year	Pop.	±% p.a.
1968	247	—
1975	202	−2.83%
1982	168	−2.60%
1990	143	−1.99%
1999	136	−0.56%
2007	113	−2.29%
2012	116	+0.53%
2017	102	−2.54%
2023	112	+1.57%
Source: INSEE

== See also ==
- Communes of the Cantal department
