= Saint-Clément, Cantal =

Commune in Auvergne-Rhône-Alpes, France

Saint-Clément
- Commune
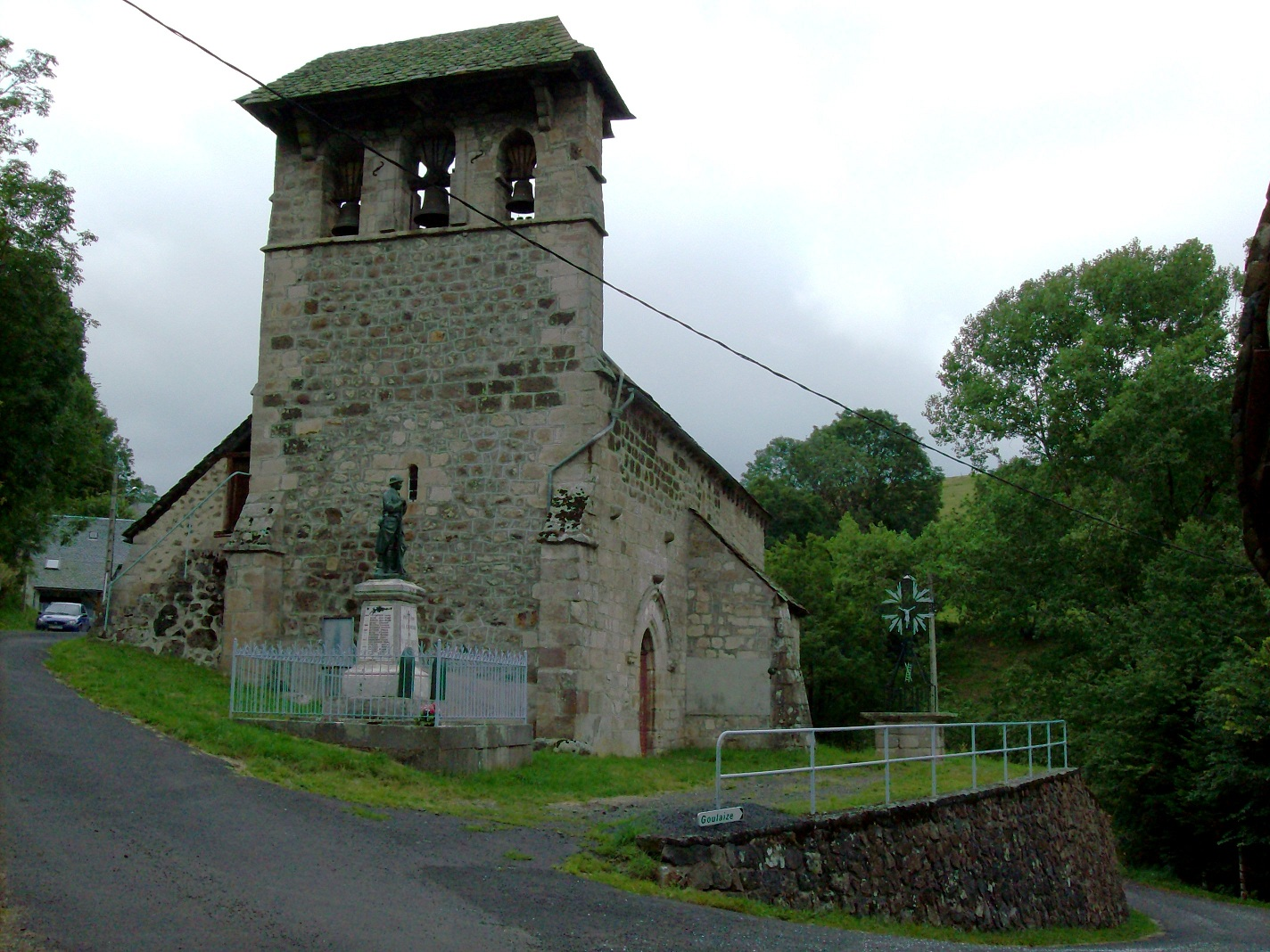
- The Church of Saint-Clément
- Location of Saint-Clément
- Location within France Location within Auvergne-Rhône-Alpes
- Coordinates: 44°58′32″N 2°39′42″E
- Country: France
- Region: Auvergne-Rhône-Alpes
- Department: Cantal
- Arrondissement: Aurillac
- Canton: Vic-sur-Cère
- Intercommunality: Cère et Goul en Carladès

Government
  - Mayor (2020–2026): Jean-Baptiste Amilhaud
- Area^{1}: 17.43 km^{2} (6.73 sq mi)
- Elevation: 1,000 m (3,300 ft)
- Highest elevation: 1,554 m (5,098 ft)
- Lowest elevation: 788 m (2,585 ft)
- Population (2023): 80
  - Density: 4.6/km^{2} (12/sq mi)
- Time zone: UTC+01:00 (CET)
  - Summer (DST): UTC+02:00 (CEST)
- INSEE/Postal code: 15180 /15800
- ^{1} French Land Register data, which excludes lakes, ponds, glaciers > 1 km^{2} (0.386 sq mi or 247 acres) and river estuaries.

Saint-Clément (French pronunciation: [sɛ̃ klemɑ̃]; Auvergnat: Sant Clamenç) is a commune in the Cantal department in south-central France.

== Population ==
Historical population
Year	Pop.	±% p.a.
1968	185	—
1975	172	−1.04%
1982	136	−3.30%
1990	107	−2.95%
1999	80	−3.18%
2007	73	−1.14%
2012	63	−2.90%
2017	75	+3.55%
2023	80	+1.08%
Source: INSEE

== See also ==
- Communes of the Cantal department
