= Yolet =

Commune in Auvergne-Rhône-Alpes, France

- Commune
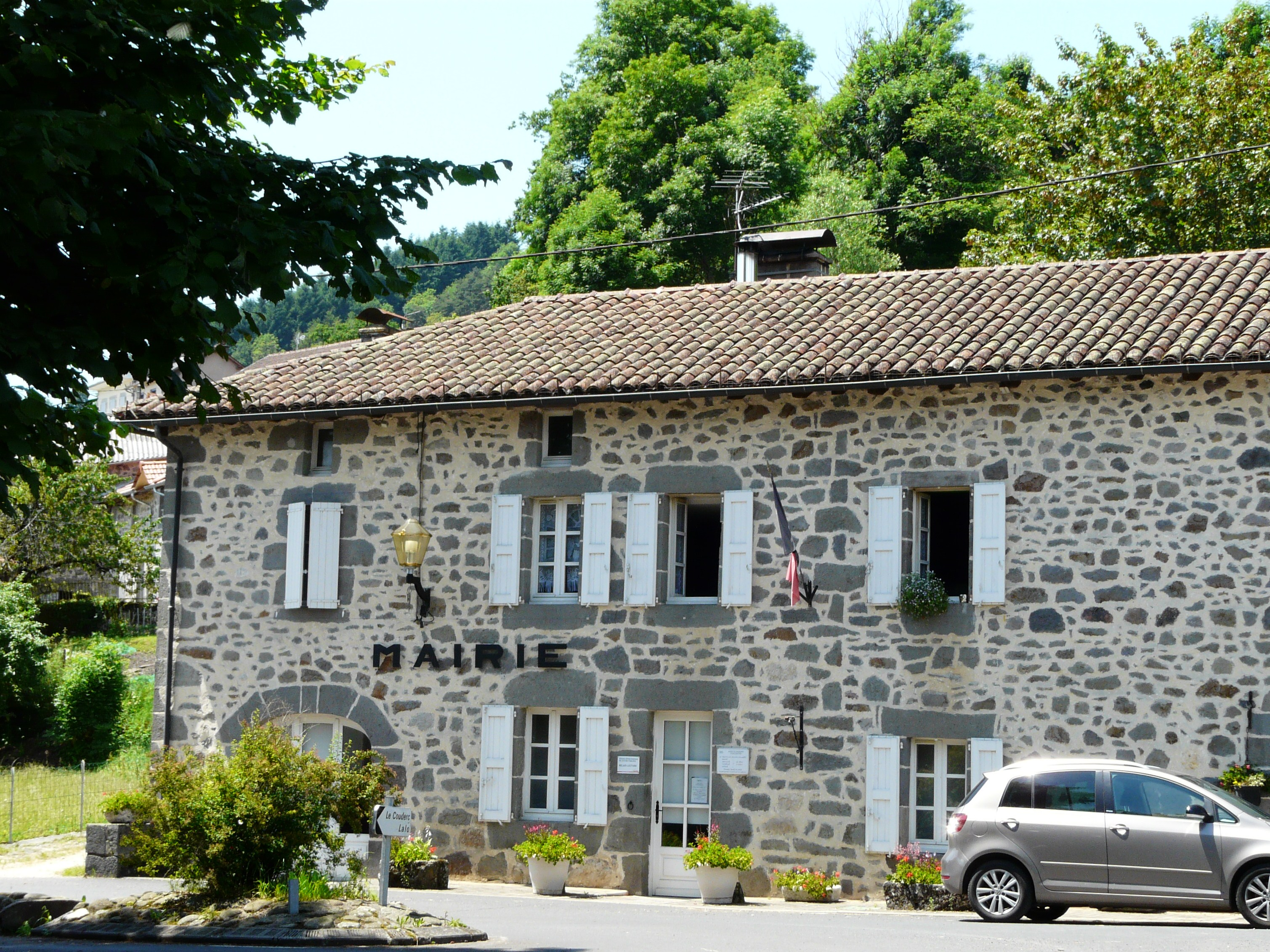
- Town hall
- Location of Yolet
- Location within France Location within Auvergne-Rhône-Alpes
- Coordinates: 44°55′46″N 2°31′59″E
- Country: France
- Region: Auvergne-Rhône-Alpes
- Department: Cantal
- Arrondissement: Aurillac
- Canton: Vic-sur-Cère
- Intercommunality: CA Aurillac Agglomération

Government
  - Mayor (2020–2026): Louis Esteves
- Area^{1}: 9.82 km^{2} (3.79 sq mi)
- Elevation: 650 m (2,130 ft)
- Highest elevation: 969 m (3,179 ft)
- Lowest elevation: 616 m (2,021 ft)
- Population (2023): 596
  - Density: 60.7/km^{2} (157/sq mi)
- Time zone: UTC+01:00 (CET)
  - Summer (DST): UTC+02:00 (CEST)
- INSEE/Postal code: 15266 /15130
- ^{1} French Land Register data, which excludes lakes, ponds, glaciers > 1 km^{2} (0.386 sq mi or 247 acres) and river estuaries.

Yolet (French pronunciation: [jɔlɛ]; Occitan: V-Iolet) is a commune in the Cantal département in south-central France.

== Population ==
Historical population
Year	Pop.	±% p.a.
1968	420	—
1975	383	−1.31%
1982	381	−0.07%
1990	459	+2.36%
1999	488	+0.68%
2007	590	+2.40%
2012	570	−0.69%
2017	550	−0.71%
2023	596	+1.35%
Source: INSEE

== People linked to the commune ==
- Jean-Baptiste Carrier (1756-1794), French Revolutionary general
- Jean de Roquetaillade (1310-1365), French Franciscan alchemist

== See also ==
- Communes of the Cantal department
