= Vézac =

Vézac may refer to the following places in France:

- Vézac, Cantal, a commune of the Cantal département
- Vézac, Dordogne, a commune of the Dordogne département
