= Mézard =

Mézard is a French surname. Notable people with the surname include:

- Ariane Mézard, French mathematician
- Jacques Mézard (born 1947), French politician
- Jean Mézard (1904-1997), French politician
- Marc Mézard (born 1957), French physicist
