= Aurillac Agglomération =

Coordinates: 44.89139°N 2.42194°E

- Communauté d'agglomération
- Country: France
- Region: Auvergne-Rhône-Alpes
- Department: Cantal
- No. of communes: {{{nbcomm}}}
- Established: 1 January 2000

Government
  - President: Pierre Mathonier
- Area: 491.9 km^{2} (189.9 sq mi)
- Population (2018): 53,247
  - Density: 108.2/km^{2} (280.4/sq mi)
- Website: www.caba.fr

Aurillac Agglomération (until 2025: Communauté d'agglomération du Bassin d'Aurillac or CABA) is the communauté d'agglomération, an intercommunal structure, centred on the city of Aurillac. It is located in the Cantal department, in the Auvergne-Rhône-Alpes region, south-central France. It was created in 1999 and came into effect on 1 January 2000. Its area is 491.9 km^{2}. Its population was 53,247 in 2018, including 25,531 in Aurillac proper.

== Composition ==
Aurillac Agglomération consists of 25 communes:

1. Arpajon-sur-Cère
2. Aurillac
3. Ayrens
4. Carlat
5. Crandelles
6. Giou-de-Mamou
7. Jussac
8. Labrousse
9. Lacapelle-Viescamp
10. Laroquevieille
11. Lascelle
12. Mandailles-Saint-Julien
13. Marmanhac
14. Naucelles
15. Reilhac
16. Saint-Cirgues-de-Jordanne
17. Saint-Paul-des-Landes
18. Saint-Simon
19. Sansac-de-Marmiesse
20. Teissières-de-Cornet
21. Velzic
22. Vézac
23. Vezels-Roussy
24. Yolet
25. Ytrac

== Administration ==
=== Administrative seat ===
The administrative seat of the Aurillac Agglomération is located on Place des Carmes in Aurillac.

=== Elected members ===
Since the re-election of municipal councils in March 2020, the Council of Communities of the Aurillac Agglomération has been composed of 68 elected councilors representing each of the member communes for a period of six years. They are distributed as follows:

Number of councilors	Communes
27	Aurillac
7	Arpajon-sur-Cère
5	Ytrac
2	Jussac, Naucelles, Reilhac, Saint-Paul-des-Landes, Saint-Simon, Sansac-de-Marmiesse, Vézac.
1 (+ 1 substitute)	Remaining 15 communes of Aurillac Agglomération.

=== Presidency ===
List of successive presidents of the communauté d'agglomération du Bassin d'Aurillac
In office		Name	Party	Capacity	Ref.
2000	2001	Yvon Bec	MDC	Mayor of Aurillac (1995—2001)	
19 March 2001	25 June 2017	Jacques Mézard	PRG	General councilor of Cantal (1995—2001); Senator from Cantal (2008—2019)	
25 June 2017	July 2020	Michel Roussy	PS	Mayor of Arpajon-sur-Cère (2014—2020)	
July 2020	Incumbent	Pierre Mathonier	PS	Mayor of Aurillac (2013—present)	

== Jurisdiction ==
The CABA has for mandatory areas of jurisdiction:

- Economic development
- Land management
- Environmental protection
- Town political structures

It is to oversee as well:

- Organization of common transport problems
- Sanitation collection and treatment
- Assessment, protection, and economic impact of the local environment
- The creation, management and assessment of cultural and sporting organizations across the communes

== Activities of the Aurillac Agglomération ==
Areas over which the Aurillac Agglomération has shared jurisdiction:

- Airports
- Fisheries and shellfish cultivation
- Vineyard cultivation
- Wine and spirits production
- Thermal energy production
- Tourism

== See also ==
- List of intercommunalities of the Cantal department
