= Vezac =

Vezac may refer to:

- Vézac, Cantal, a commune of the Cantal département, France
- Vézac, Dordogne, a commune of the Dordogne département, France
- Vezac, Croatia, a village near Primošten
