= Besse, Cantal =

Commune in Auvergne-Rhône-Alpes, France

Besse
- Commune
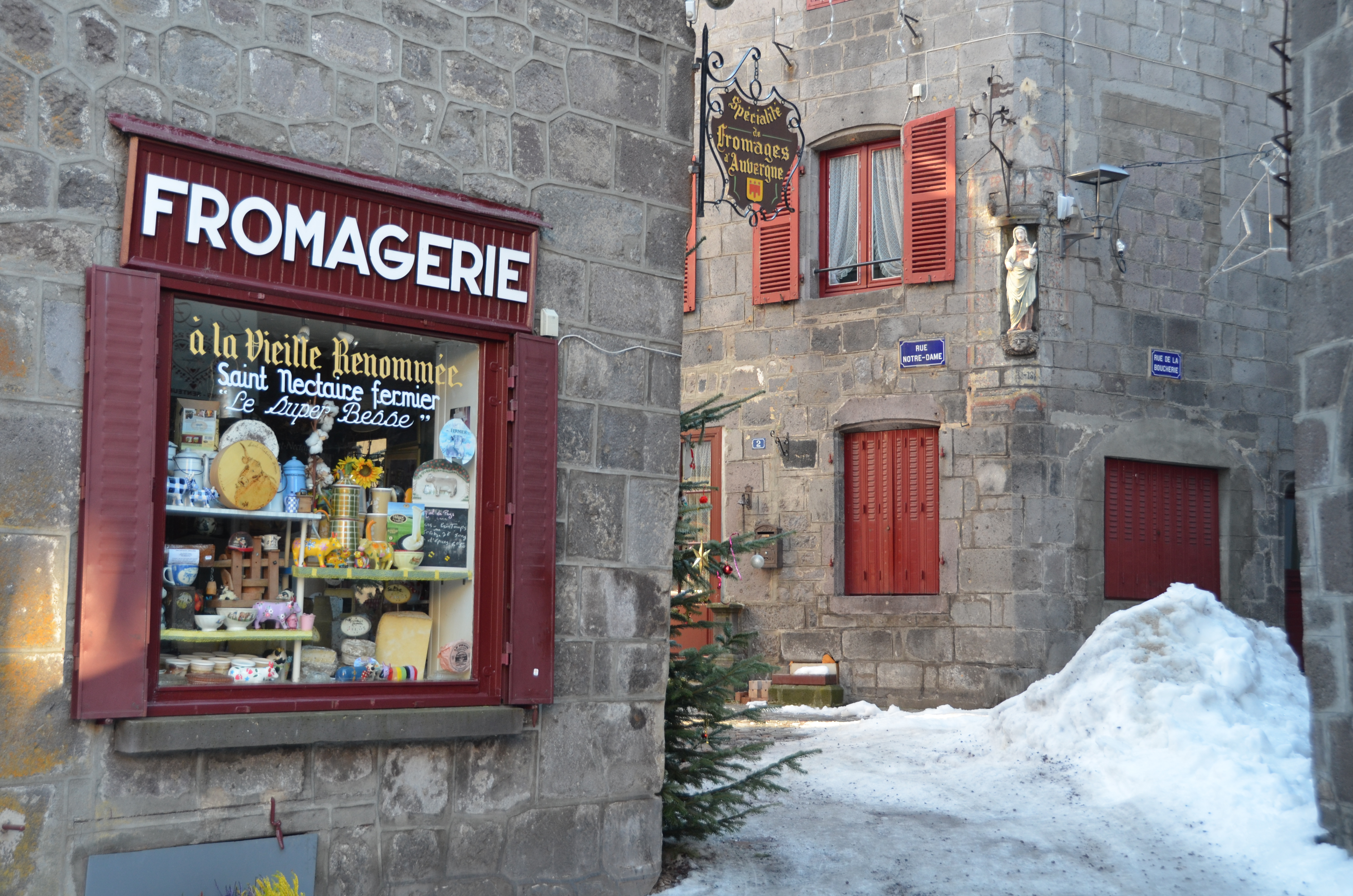
- The cheese shop in Besse
- Location of Besse
- Location within France Location within Auvergne-Rhône-Alpes
- Coordinates: 45°05′49″N 2°21′00″E
- Country: France
- Region: Auvergne-Rhône-Alpes
- Department: Cantal
- Arrondissement: Aurillac
- Canton: Naucelles
- Intercommunality: Pays de Salers

Government
  - Mayor (2020–2026): Nadine Antignac
- Area^{1}: 3.77 km^{2} (1.46 sq mi)
- Elevation: 750 m (2,460 ft)
- Highest elevation: 769 m (2,523 ft)
- Lowest elevation: 559 m (1,834 ft)
- Population (2023): 136
  - Density: 36.1/km^{2} (93.4/sq mi)
- Time zone: UTC+01:00 (CET)
  - Summer (DST): UTC+02:00 (CEST)
- INSEE/Postal code: 15269 /15140
- ^{1} French Land Register data, which excludes lakes, ponds, glaciers > 1 km^{2} (0.386 sq mi or 247 acres) and river estuaries.

Besse (French pronunciation: [bɛs]; Occitan: Beça) is a commune in the Cantal department in south-central France. It was created in 1953 from part of Saint-Cirgues-de-Malbert.

== Geography ==
The Maronne river forms the commune's northern border.

== Population ==
Historical population
Year	Pop.	±% p.a.
1968	199	—
1975	176	−1.74%
1982	159	−1.44%
1990	153	−0.48%
1999	143	−0.75%
2007	134	−0.81%
2012	126	−1.22%
2017	126	+0.00%
2023	136	+1.28%
Source: INSEE

== See also ==
- Communes of the Cantal department
