= List of senators of Cantal =

Location of Cantal in France

Following is a list of senators of Cantal, people who have represented the department of Cantal in the Senate of France.

== Third Republic ==
Senators for Cantal under the French Third Republic were:

- Jules Bertrand (1876–1882)
- Félix Esquirou (Parieu) (1876–1885)
- Jean Brugerolle (1882–1884)
- Léon Cabanes (1885–1886)
- Joseph Cabanes (1885–1891)
- Paul Deves (1886–1899)
- Albert Baduel (1891–1903)
- Francis Charmes (1900–1912)
- Eugène Lintilhac (1903–1920)
- Gabriel Peschaud (1912–1920)
- Noël Cazals (1921–1930)
- Frédéric François-Marsal (1921–1930)
- Louis Dauzier (1929–1945)
- Henri Brunel (1930–1939)
- Stanislas (Castellane) (1938–1945)

== Fourth Republic ==
Senators for Cantal under the French Fourth Republic were:

- Hector Peschaud (1946–1959)
- Paul Piales (1948–1959)

== Fifth Republic ==
Senators for Cantal under the French Fifth Republic:

In office	Name	Group	Notes
1959–1968	Hector Peschaud	Centre National des Indépendants et Paysans	Died in office 19 September 1968
1959–1971	Paul Piales	Centre Républicain d'Action Rurale et Sociale	
1968–1971	Louis Thioléron	Centre Républicain d'Action Rurale et Sociale	Replaced Hector Peschaud 20 September 1968
1971–1980	Jean Mézard	Centre National des Indépendants et Paysans	
1971–1989	Paul Malassagne	Rassemblement pour la République	
1980–1989	Paul Robert	Rassemblement Démocratique et Européen	
1989–1998	Roger Rigaudière	Rassemblement pour la République	
1989–2008	Roger Besse	Union pour un Mouvement Populaire	
1998–2015	Pierre Jarlier	Union des Démocrates et Indépendants	Removed from office 11 June 2015
2008–2017	Jacques Mézard	Rassemblement Démocratique et Social Européen	Resigned 17 June 2017 (appointed to cabinet)
2017–present	Josiane Costes	Rassemblement Démocratique et Social Européen	Replaced Jacques Mézard 18 June 2017
2015–present	Bernard Delcros	Union Centriste	Elected 6 September 2015

== Sources ==
- Liste des anciens sénateurs de la IIIème République par circonscription (in French), Sénat de France
- Liste des anciens sénateurs de la IVème République par circonscription (in French), Sénat de France
- Liste des anciens sénateurs de la Vème République par circonscription (in French), Sénat de France
- Liste par département – Cantal (in French), Sénat de France
