= Saint-Chamant =

Saint-Chamant may refer to the following places in France:

- Saint-Chamant, Cantal, a commune in the department of Cantal
- Saint-Chamant, Corrèze, a commune in the department of Corrèze
