= Malbert =

Malbert is a name of French origin. It may refer to:

== People ==
- Albert Malbert, French film actor

== Places ==
- Saint-Cirgues-de-Malbert, commune in south-central France
