= Reilhac =

Reilhac may refer to the following places in France:

- Reilhac, Cantal, a commune in the Cantal department
- Reilhac, Lot, a commune in the Lot department
