= 2019 Critérium du Dauphiné =

2019 UCI World Tour, race 25 of 38

Race details
- Dates: 9–16 June 2019
- Stages: 8
- Distance: 1,195.6 km (742.9 mi)
- Winning time: 30h 44' 27"

Results
Jersey awarded to the overall winner	Winner	Jakob Fuglsang (DEN)	(Astana)
	Second	Tejay van Garderen (USA)	(EF Education First)
	Third	Emanuel Buchmann (GER)	(Bora–Hansgrohe)
Jersey awarded to the points classification winner	Points	Wout Van Aert (BEL)	(Team Jumbo–Visma)
Jersey awarded to the mountains classification winner	Mountains	Julian Alaphilippe (FRA)	(Deceuninck–Quick-Step)
Jersey awarded to the young rider classification winner	Young rider	Bjorg Lambrecht (BEL)	(Lotto–Soudal)
	Team	Astana	

The 2019 Critérium du Dauphiné was the 71st edition of the Critérium du Dauphiné, a road cycling stage race. The race took place between 9 and 16 June 2019, in France and Switzerland. On 25 March 2019, the race organisers, the Amaury Sport Organisation (ASO), announced the route at a presentation in Lyon.

== Teams ==
The eighteen UCI WorldTeams were automatically invited to participate. In addition, four UCI Professional Continental teams received wildcard invitations: Cofidis, Arkéa–Samsic, Vital Concept–B&B Hotels and Wanty–Gobert. In total, twenty-two teams started the race, with seven riders per team:

UCI WorldTeams

- AG2R La Mondiale
- Astana
- Bahrain–Merida
- Bora–Hansgrohe
- CCC Team
- Deceuninck–Quick-Step
- EF Education First
- Groupama–FDJ
- Team Katusha–Alpecin
- Lotto–Soudal
- Mitchelton–Scott
- Movistar Team
- Team Dimension Data
- Team Jumbo–Visma
- Team Sunweb
- Trek–Segafredo
- UAE Team Emirates
- Team INEOS

UCI Professional Continental teams

- Cofidis
- Arkéa–Samsic
- Vital Concept–B&B Hotels
- Wanty–Gobert

== Pre-race favourites ==
Chris Froome (Team INEOS) was the favourite for the race, having won three previous editions. Defending champion Geraint Thomas (Team INEOS) was not in the field. Jakob Fuglsang (Astana), Richie Porte (Lidl–Trek), Nairo Quintana (Movistar Team) and Tom Dumoulin (Team Picnic–PostNL) were considered as the nearest rivals.

== Route ==
Stage characteristics and winners
Stage	Date	Course	Distance	Type	Winner
1	9 June	Aurillac to Jussac	142 km (88.2 mi)	Medium mountain stage	Edvald Boasson Hagen (NOR)
2	10 June	Mauriac to Craponne-sur-Arzon	180 km (111.8 mi)	Hilly stage	Dylan Teuns (BEL)
3	11 June	Le Puy-en-Velay to Riom	172 km (106.9 mi)	Hilly stage	Sam Bennett (IRL)
4	12 June	Roanne to Roanne	26.1 km (16.2 mi)	Individual time trial	Wout Van Aert (BEL)
5	13 June	Boën-sur-Lignon to Voiron	201 km (124.9 mi)	Hilly stage	Wout Van Aert (BEL)
6	14 June	Saint-Vulbas to Saint-Michel-de-Maurienne	228 km (141.7 mi)	Medium mountain stage	Julian Alaphilippe (FRA)
7	15 June	Saint-Genix-les-Villages to Les Sept Laux-Pipay	133 km (82.6 mi)	Mountain stage	Wout Poels (NED)
8	16 June	Cluses to Champéry (Switzerland)	113.5 km (70.5 mi)	Medium mountain stage	Dylan Van Baarle (NED)
	Total		1,195.6 km (743 mi)		

== Stages ==
=== Stage 1 ===
9 June 2019 - Aurillac to Jussac, 142 km (88.2 mi)

Stage 1 result
Rank	Rider	Team	Time
1	Edvald Boasson Hagen (NOR)	Team Dimension Data	3h 24' 33"
2	Philippe Gilbert (BEL)	Deceuninck–Quick-Step	+ 0"
3	Wout Van Aert (BEL)	Team Jumbo–Visma	+ 0"
4	Nils Politt (GER)	Team Katusha–Alpecin	+ 0"
5	Gregor Mühlberger (AUT)	Bora–Hansgrohe	+ 0"
6	Sonny Colbrelli (ITA)	Bahrain–Merida	+ 0"
7	Jonas Koch (GER)	CCC Team	+ 0"
8	Alexey Lutsenko (KAZ)	Astana	+ 0"
9	Benoît Cosnefroy (FRA)	AG2R La Mondiale	+ 0"
10	Michał Kwiatkowski (POL)	Team INEOS	+ 0"

General classification after stage 1
Rank	Rider	Team	Time
1	Edvald Boasson Hagen (NOR)	Team Dimension Data	3h 24' 23"
2	Philippe Gilbert (BEL)	Deceuninck–Quick-Step	+ 4"
3	Wout Van Aert (BEL)	Team Jumbo–Visma	+ 6"
4	Nils Politt (GER)	Team Katusha–Alpecin	+ 10"
5	Gregor Mühlberger (AUT)	Bora–Hansgrohe	+ 10"
6	Sonny Colbrelli (ITA)	Bahrain–Merida	+ 10"
7	Jonas Koch (GER)	CCC Team	+ 10"
8	Alexey Lutsenko (KAZ)	Astana	+ 10"
9	Benoît Cosnefroy (FRA)	AG2R La Mondiale	+ 10"
10	Michał Kwiatkowski (POL)	Team INEOS	+ 10"

=== Stage 2 ===
10 June 2019 - Mauriac to Craponne-sur-Arzon, 180 km (111.8 mi)

Stage 2 result
Rank	Rider	Team	Time
1	Dylan Teuns (BEL)	Bahrain–Merida	4h 12' 41"
2	Guillaume Martin (FRA)	Wanty–Gobert	+ 0"
3	Jakob Fuglsang (DEN)	Astana	+ 13"
4	Thibaut Pinot (FRA)	Groupama–FDJ	+ 13"
5	Michael Woods (CAN)	EF Education First	+ 13"
6	Alexey Lutsenko (KAZ)	Astana	+ 13"
7	Petr Vakoč (CZE)	Deceuninck–Quick-Step	+ 13"
8	Nairo Quintana (COL)	Movistar Team	+ 13"
9	Wout Poels (NED)	Team INEOS	+ 13"
10	Adam Yates (GBR)	Mitchelton–Scott	+ 13"

General classification after stage 2
Rank	Rider	Team	Time
1	Dylan Teuns (BEL)	Bahrain–Merida	7h 37' 03"
2	Guillaume Martin (FRA)	Wanty–Gobert	+ 3"
3	Jakob Fuglsang (DEN)	Astana	+ 20"
4	Alexey Lutsenko (KAZ)	Astana	+ 21"
5	Nairo Quintana (COL)	Movistar Team	+ 24"
6	Michael Woods (CAN)	EF Education First	+ 24"
7	Wout Poels (NED)	Team INEOS	+ 24"
8	Chris Froome (GBR)	Team INEOS	+ 24"
9	Thibaut Pinot (FRA)	Groupama–FDJ	+ 24"
10	Adam Yates (GBR)	Mitchelton–Scott	+ 24"

=== Stage 3 ===
11 June 2019 - Le Puy-en-Velay to Riom, 172 km (106.9 mi)

Stage 3 result
Rank	Rider	Team	Time
1	Sam Bennett (IRL)	Bora–Hansgrohe	4h 15' 25"
2	Wout Van Aert (BEL)	Team Jumbo–Visma	+ 0"
3	Davide Ballerini (ITA)	Astana	+ 0"
4	Clément Venturini (FRA)	AG2R La Mondiale	+ 0"
5	Edward Theuns (BEL)	Trek–Segafredo	+ 0"
6	Edvald Boasson Hagen (NOR)	Team Dimension Data	+ 0"
7	Álvaro Hodeg (COL)	Deceuninck–Quick-Step	+ 0"
8	Jens Debusschere (BEL)	Team Katusha–Alpecin	+ 0"
9	Luka Mezgec (SLO)	Mitchelton–Scott	+ 0"
10	Bjorg Lambrecht (BEL)	Lotto–Soudal	+ 0"

General classification after stage 3
Rank	Rider	Team	Time
1	Dylan Teuns (BEL)	Bahrain–Merida	11h 52' 28"
2	Guillaume Martin (FRA)	Wanty–Gobert	+ 3"
3	Alexey Lutsenko (KAZ)	Astana	+ 20"
4	Jakob Fuglsang (DEN)	Astana	+ 20"
5	Nairo Quintana (COL)	Movistar Team	+ 24"
6	Thibaut Pinot (FRA)	Groupama–FDJ	+ 24"
7	Michael Woods (CAN)	EF Education First	+ 24"
8	Chris Froome (GBR)	Team INEOS	+ 24"
9	Wout Poels (NED)	Team INEOS	+ 24"
10	Adam Yates (GBR)	Mitchelton–Scott	+ 24"

=== Stage 4 ===
12 June 2019 - Roanne to Roanne, 26.1 km (16.2 mi) (ITT)

Pre-race favourite Chris Froome suffered a crash during the route reconnaissance before the stage, resulting in fractures of the pelvis, femur, elbow and ribs. Team principal Dave Brailsford later confirmed that Froome would miss the rest of the race, and the 2019 Tour de France.

Stage 4 result
Rank	Rider	Team	Time
1	Wout Van Aert (BEL)	Team Jumbo–Visma	33' 38"
2	Tejay van Garderen (USA)	EF Education First	+ 31"
3	Tom Dumoulin (NED)	Team Sunweb	+ 47"
4	Steven Kruijswijk (NED)	Team Jumbo–Visma	+ 49"
5	Emanuel Buchmann (GER)	Bora–Hansgrohe	+ 51"
6	Adam Yates (GBR)	Mitchelton–Scott	+ 56"
7	Julian Alaphilippe (FRA)	Deceuninck–Quick-Step	+ 59"
8	Nils Politt (GER)	Team Katusha–Alpecin	+ 1' 05"
9	Jakob Fuglsang (DEN)	Astana	+ 1' 07"
10	Rémi Cavagna (FRA)	Deceuninck–Quick-Step	+ 1' 10"

General classification after stage 4
Rank	Rider	Team	Time
1	Adam Yates (GBR)	Mitchelton–Scott	12h 27' 26"
2	Dylan Teuns (BEL)	Bahrain–Merida	+ 4"
3	Tejay van Garderen (USA)	EF Education First	+ 6"
4	Jakob Fuglsang (DEN)	Astana	+ 7"
5	Steven Kruijswijk (NED)	Team Jumbo–Visma	+ 24"
6	Thibaut Pinot (FRA)	Groupama–FDJ	+ 25"
7	Emanuel Buchmann (GER)	Bora–Hansgrohe	+ 26"
8	Alexey Lutsenko (KAZ)	Astana	+ 30"
9	Wout Van Aert (BEL)	Team Jumbo–Visma	+ 30"
10	Nairo Quintana (COL)	Movistar Team	+ 40"

=== Stage 5 ===
13 June 2019 - Boën-sur-Lignon to Voiron, 201 km (124.9 mi)

Stage 5 result
Rank	Rider	Team	Time
1	Wout Van Aert (BEL)	Team Jumbo–Visma	5h 00' 34"
2	Sam Bennett (IRL)	Bora–Hansgrohe	+ 0"
3	Julian Alaphilippe (FRA)	Deceuninck–Quick-Step	+ 0"
4	Lorenzo Manzin (FRA)	Vital Concept–B&B Hotels	+ 0"
5	Clément Venturini (FRA)	AG2R La Mondiale	+ 0"
6	Edvald Boasson Hagen (NOR)	Team Dimension Data	+ 0"
7	Zdeněk Štybar (CZE)	Deceuninck–Quick-Step	+ 0"
8	Sonny Colbrelli (ITA)	Bahrain–Merida	+ 0"
9	Philippe Gilbert (BEL)	Deceuninck–Quick-Step	+ 0"
10	Mads Würtz Schmidt (DEN)	Team Katusha–Alpecin	+ 0"

General classification after stage 5
Rank	Rider	Team	Time
1	Adam Yates (GBR)	Mitchelton–Scott	17h 28' 00"
2	Dylan Teuns (BEL)	Bahrain–Merida	+ 4"
3	Tejay van Garderen (USA)	EF Education First	+ 6"
4	Jakob Fuglsang (DEN)	Astana	+ 7"
5	Wout Van Aert (BEL)	Team Jumbo–Visma	+ 20"
6	Steven Kruijswijk (NED)	Team Jumbo–Visma	+ 24"
7	Thibaut Pinot (FRA)	Groupama–FDJ	+ 25"
8	Emanuel Buchmann (GER)	Bora–Hansgrohe	+ 26"
9	Alexey Lutsenko (KAZ)	Astana	+ 30"
10	Nairo Quintana (COL)	Movistar Team	+ 40"

=== Stage 6 ===
14 June 2019 - Saint-Vulbas to Saint-Michel-de-Maurienne, 228 km (141.7 mi)

Stage 6 result
Rank	Rider	Team	Time
1	Julian Alaphilippe (FRA)	Deceuninck–Quick-Step	6h 00' 54"
2	Gregor Mühlberger (AUT)	Bora–Hansgrohe	+ 0"
3	Alessandro De Marchi (ITA)	CCC Team	+ 22"
4	Wout Poels (NED)	Team INEOS	+ 6' 10"
5	Gorka Izagirre (ESP)	Astana	+ 6' 10"
6	Jakob Fuglsang (DEN)	Astana	+ 6' 10"
7	Jack Haig (AUS)	Mitchelton–Scott	+ 6' 10"
8	Adam Yates (GBR)	Mitchelton–Scott	+ 6' 10"
9	Nairo Quintana (COL)	Movistar Team	+ 6' 10"
10	Alexey Lutsenko (KAZ)	Astana	+ 6' 10"

General classification after stage 6
Rank	Rider	Team	Time
1	Adam Yates (GBR)	Mitchelton–Scott	23h 35' 04"
2	Dylan Teuns (BEL)	Bahrain–Merida	+ 4"
3	Tejay van Garderen (USA)	EF Education First	+ 6"
4	Jakob Fuglsang (DEN)	Astana	+ 7"
5	Steven Kruijswijk (NED)	Team Jumbo–Visma	+ 24"
6	Thibaut Pinot (FRA)	Groupama–FDJ	+ 25"
7	Emanuel Buchmann (GER)	Bora–Hansgrohe	+ 26"
8	Alexey Lutsenko (KAZ)	Astana	+ 30"
9	Nairo Quintana (COL)	Movistar Team	+ 40"
10	Wout Poels (NED)	Team INEOS	+ 40"

=== Stage 7 ===
15 June 2019 - Saint-Genix-les-Villages to Les Sept Laux-Pipay, 133 km (82.6 mi)

Tom Dumoulin, one of the pre-race favourites, withdrew from the race before the start of the stage. During the stage, the weather started sunny, but the day's last two climbs occurred in heavy rain.

Stage 7 result
Rank	Rider	Team	Time
1	Wout Poels (NED)	Team INEOS	4h 01' 34"
2	Jakob Fuglsang (DEN)	Astana	+ 1"
3	Emanuel Buchmann (GER)	Bora–Hansgrohe	+ 1"
4	Thibaut Pinot (FRA)	Groupama–FDJ	+ 10"
5	Daniel Martin (IRL)	UAE Team Emirates	+ 10"
6	Adam Yates (GBR)	Mitchelton–Scott	+ 10"
7	Romain Bardet (FRA)	AG2R La Mondiale	+ 13"
8	Tejay van Garderen (USA)	EF Education First	+ 16"
9	Dylan Teuns (BEL)	Bahrain–Merida	+ 30"
10	Bjorg Lambrecht (BEL)	Lotto–Soudal	+ 34"

General classification after stage 7
Rank	Rider	Team	Time
1	Jakob Fuglsang (DEN)	Astana	27h 36' 40"
2	Adam Yates (GBR)	Mitchelton–Scott	+ 8"
3	Tejay van Garderen (USA)	EF Education First	+ 20"
4	Emanuel Buchmann (GER)	Bora–Hansgrohe	+ 21"
5	Wout Poels (NED)	Team INEOS	+ 28"
6	Dylan Teuns (BEL)	Bahrain–Merida	+ 32"
7	Thibaut Pinot (FRA)	Groupama–FDJ	+ 33"
8	Alexey Lutsenko (KAZ)	Astana	+ 1' 12"
9	Steven Kruijswijk (NED)	Team Jumbo–Visma	+ 1' 20"
10	Daniel Martin (IRL)	UAE Team Emirates	+ 1' 21"

=== Stage 8 ===
16 June 2019 - Cluses to Champéry (Switzerland), 113.5 km (70.5 mi)

Adam Yates, second place on the general classification, abandoned the race in the final 50 km (31 mi).

Stage 8 result
Rank	Rider	Team	Time
1	Dylan van Baarle (NED)	Team INEOS	3h 05' 48"
2	Jack Haig (AUS)	Mitchelton–Scott	+ 0"
3	Carl Fredrik Hagen (NOR)	Lotto–Soudal	+ 50"
4	Warren Barguil (FRA)	Arkéa–Samsic	+ 1' 12"
5	Sepp Kuss (USA)	Team Jumbo–Visma	+ 1' 12"
6	Sébastien Reichenbach (SUI)	Groupama–FDJ	+ 1' 12"
7	Julian Alaphilippe (FRA)	Deceuninck–Quick-Step	+ 1' 16"
8	Alexey Lutsenko (KAZ)	Astana	+ 1' 59"
9	Xandro Meurisse (BEL)	Wanty–Gobert	+ 1' 59"
10	Emanuel Buchmann (GER)	Bora–Hansgrohe	+ 1' 59"

== Classification leadership table ==
In the Critérium du Dauphiné, four different jerseys were awarded. The most important was the general classification, which was calculated by adding each cyclist's finishing times on each stage. Time bonuses were awarded to the first three finishers on all stages except for the individual time trial: the stage winner won a ten-second bonus, with six and four seconds for the second and third riders respectively. The rider with the least accumulated time is the race leader, identified by a yellow jersey with a blue bar; the winner of this classification was considered the winner of the race.

Points for the points classification
Position	1	2	3	4	5	6	7	8	9	10
Stages 1–3 & 5	25	22	20	18	16	14	12	10	8	6
Stages 4, 6–8	15	12	10	8	6	5	4	3	2	1

Additionally, there was a points classification, which awarded a green jersey. In the classification, cyclists received points for finishing in the top 10 in a stage. More points were awarded on the flatter stages in the opening half of the race.

Points for the mountains classification
Position	1	2	3	4	5	6	7	8	9	10
Points for Hors-category	15	12	10	8	6	5	4	3	2	1
Points for Category 1	10	8	6	4	2	1	0			
Points for Category 2	5	3	2	1	0					
Points for Category 3	2	1	0							
Points for Category 4	1	0								

There was also a mountains classification, the leadership of which was marked by a blue jersey with white polka dots. In the mountains classification, points towards the classification were won by reaching the top of a climb before other cyclists. Each climb was categorised as either hors, first, second, third, or fourth-category, with more points available for the higher-categorised climbs. Hors-category climbs awarded the most points; the first ten riders were able to accrue points, compared with the first six on first-category climbs, the first four on second-category, the first two on third-category and only the first for fourth-category.

The fourth jersey represented the young rider classification, marked by a white jersey. This was decided the same way as the general classification, but only riders born on or after 1 January 1993 were eligible to be ranked in the classification. There was also a team classification, in which the times of the best three cyclists per team on each stage were added together; the leading team at the end of the race was the team with the lowest total time.

Classification leadership by stage
Stage	Winner	General classification	Points classification	Mountains classification	Young rider classification	Team classification
1	Edvald Boasson Hagen	Edvald Boasson Hagen	Edvald Boasson Hagen	Casper Pedersen	Wout van Aert	Wanty–Gobert
2	Dylan Teuns	Dylan Teuns	Alexey Lutsenko	Casper Pedersen	Wout van Aert	Astana
3	Sam Bennett	Dylan Teuns	Wout van Aert	Casper Pedersen	Wout van Aert	Astana
4	Wout van Aert	Adam Yates	Wout van Aert	Casper Pedersen	Wout van Aert	EF Education First
5	Wout van Aert	Adam Yates	Wout van Aert	Casper Pedersen	Wout van Aert	EF Education First
6	Julian Alaphilippe	Adam Yates	Wout van Aert	Julian Alaphilippe	Bjorg Lambrecht	EF Education First
7	Wout Poels	Jakob Fuglsang	Wout van Aert	Julian Alaphilippe	Bjorg Lambrecht	Astana
8	Dylan Van Baarle	Jakob Fuglsang	Wout van Aert	Julian Alaphilippe	Bjorg Lambrecht	Astana
Final		Jakob Fuglsang	Wout Van Aert	Julian Alaphilippe	Bjorg Lambrecht	Astana

== Final classification standings ==
Legend
General classification	Denotes the leader of the general classification
	Denotes the leader of the points classification
	Denotes the leader of the mountains classification
	Denotes the leader of the young rider classification
	Denotes the leader of the team classification

=== General classification ===
Final general classification
Rank	Rider	Team	Time
1	Jakob Fuglsang (DEN)	Astana	30h 44' 27"
2	Tejay van Garderen (USA)	EF Education First	+ 20"
3	Emanuel Buchmann (GER)	Bora–Hansgrohe	+ 21"
4	Wout Poels (NED)	Team INEOS	+ 28"
5	Thibaut Pinot (FRA)	Groupama–FDJ	+ 33"
6	Dylan Teuns (BEL)	Bahrain–Merida	+ 1' 11"
7	Alexey Lutsenko (KAZ)	Astana	+ 1' 12"
8	Daniel Martin (IRL)	UAE Team Emirates	+ 1' 21"
9	Nairo Quintana (COL)	Movistar Team	+ 1' 24"
10	Romain Bardet (FRA)	AG2R La Mondiale	+ 1' 38"

=== Points classification ===
Final points classification
Rank	Rider	Team	Points
1	Wout van Aert (BEL)	Team Jumbo–Visma	82
2	Edvald Boasson Hagen (NOR)	Team Dimension Data	53
3	Julian Alaphilippe (FRA)	Deceuninck–Quick-Step	49
4	Alexey Lutsenko (KAZ)	Astana	48
5	Sam Bennett (IRL)	Bora–Hansgrohe	47
6	Jakob Fuglsang (DEN)	Astana	39
7	Wout Poels (NED)	Team INEOS	31
8	Dylan Teuns (BEL)	Bahrain–Merida	31
9	Nils Politt (GER)	Team Katusha–Alpecin	31
10	Philippe Gilbert (BEL)	Deceuninck–Quick-Step	30

=== Mountains classification ===
Final mountains classification
Rank	Rider	Team	Points
1	Julian Alaphilippe (FRA)	Deceuninck–Quick-Step	75
2	Magnus Cort Nielsen (DEN)	Astana	25
3	Wout Poels (NED)	Team INEOS	15
4	Jack Haig (AUS)	Mitchelton–Scott	14
5	Alessandro De Marchi (ITA)	CCC Team	14
6	Dylan van Baarle (NED)	Team INEOS	14
7	Lennard Hofstede (NED)	Team Jumbo–Visma	14
8	Jakob Fuglsang (DEN)	Astana	12
9	Emanuel Buchmann (GER)	Bora–Hansgrohe	12
10	Alexey Lutsenko (KAZ)	Astana	10

=== Young rider classification ===
Final young rider classification
Rank	Rider	Team	Time
1	Bjorg Lambrecht (BEL)	Lotto–Soudal	30h 47' 44"
2	Neilson Powless (USA)	Team Jumbo–Visma	+ 11' 42"
3	Sepp Kuss (USA)	Team Jumbo–Visma	+ 16' 02"
4	Nils Politt (GER)	Team Katusha–Alpecin	+ 24' 31"
5	Gianni Moscon (ITA)	Team INEOS	+ 24' 42"
6	David Gaudu (FRA)	Groupama–FDJ	+ 32' 55"
7	Robert Power (AUS)	Team Sunweb	+ 33' 34"
8	Wout Van Aert (BEL)	Team Jumbo–Visma	+ 41' 52"
9	Lennard Hofstede (NED)	Team Jumbo–Visma	+ 47' 17"
10	Cristian Camilo Muñoz (COL)	UAE Team Emirates	+ 49' 38"

=== Teams classification ===
Final teams classification
Rank	Team	Time
1	(Kazakhstan) Astana	92h 19' 24"
2	(United Kingdom) Team INEOS	+ 12' 58"
3	(France) Groupama–FDJ	+ 13' 22"
4	(Netherlands) Team Jumbo–Visma	+ 18' 38"
5	(Australia) Mitchelton–Scott	+ 27' 21"
6	(United States) EF Education First	+ 34' 30"
7	(Spain) Movistar Team	+ 37' 47"
8	Bahrain–Merida	+ 38' 05"
9	(Belgium) Wanty–Gobert	+ 40' 17"
10	(United Arab Emirates) UAE Team Emirates	+ 49' 52"
