= Stéphane Travert =

French politician (born 1969)

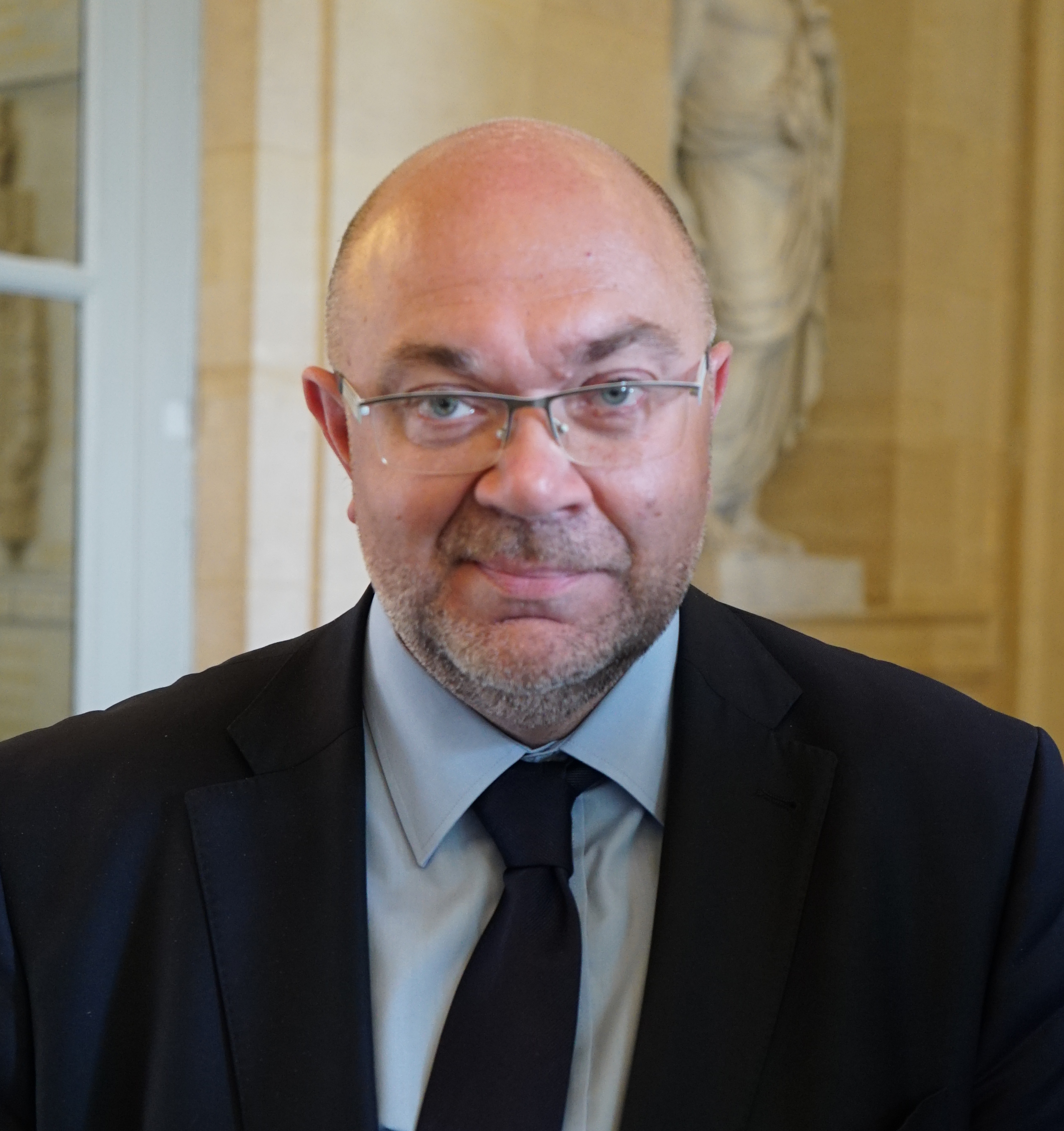

Member of the National Assembly for Manche's 3rd constituency
- Incumbent
- Assumed office 17 November 2018
- Preceded by: Grégory Galbadon
- In office 20 June 2012 – 21 July 2017
- Preceded by: Alain Cousin
- Succeeded by: Grégory Galbadon

Minister of Agriculture and Food
- In office 21 June 2017 – 16 October 2018
- Prime Minister: Édouard Philippe
- Preceded by: Jacques Mézard
- Succeeded by: Didier Guillaume

Regional councillor of Normandy
- In office 1 January 2016 – 20 December 2017

Regional councillor of Lower Normandy
- In office 26 March 2010 – 31 December 2015

Personal details
- Born: 12 October 1969 (age 56) Carentan, France
- Party: Socialist Party (1988–2017); Renaissance (2016–present)
- Other party: Territories of Progress (2020–present)
- Profession: Corporate executive

Stéphane Travert (French pronunciation: [stefan tʁavɛʁ]; born 12 October 1969) is a French politician who has represented Manche's 3rd constituency in the National Assembly since 2018, previously holding the seat from 2012 to 2017.

Travert began his political career in the Socialist Party, which he first joined in 1988. He held several local and national executive positions in the party during the 2000s before being elected to the National Assembly in Manche's 3rd constituency in the 2012 French legislative elections. Although Travert began his tenure on the left wing of the Socialist group, he gradually grew closer to Emmanuel Macron while serving as rapporteur for the latter's Macron Law in 2015. Travert left the Socialists to join En Marche! and Territories of Progress in 2016 and became a national delegate for En Marche! in October of that year.

Travert was re-elected in the 2017 French legislative elections before being named Minister of Agriculture and Food in the second Philippe government. He returned to the National Assembly in October 2018.

Before entering the National Assembly, Travert served on the Regional Council of Lower Normandy from 2010 to 2015 and the Regional Council of Normandy from 2016 to 2017.

== Early life and education ==
Stéphane Travert was born in Carentan, France on 12 October 1969 and grew up in La Haye-du-Puits, where his father worked in a printing house and was a labour union activist in Workers' Force. Travert attended business school and graduated with a Brevet de technicien supérieur in commercial activity. He began his professional career in the manufacturing sector before becoming chief of staff to the deputy mayor of Caen, Philippe Duron.

== Political career ==
=== Beginnings ===
Travert joined the Socialist Party (PS) at the age of 18 and served as first secretary of the party's Manche federation from 2002 to 2003 and again starting in 2005. It was during this time that he also became a member of the national party office. Travert successfully lobbied for the "No" side in the 2005 French European Constitution referendum. During the PS Reims Congress of 2008, he supported Benoît Hamon and then Martine Aubry for first secretary. Travert regards former Socialist first secretary Henri Emmanuelli as his "godfather in politics."

=== First term in the National Assembly ===
Travert was elected deputy for Manche's 3rd constituency in the 2012 French legislative elections, defeating incumbent Alain Cousin of the Union for a Popular Movement. In 2014, he joined the frondeurs, a group of dissident Socialist deputies who refused to vote for Prime Minister Manuel Valls in a vote of confidence. Travert also opposed several pieces of economic and budgetary legislation, such as those surrounding job security or the European Fiscal Compact. As a result, Mediapart described him as being on the "left wing of the PS, close to Benoît Hamon."

Travert was one of the first political figures to support Emmanuel Macron, who he met in September 2014 during a visit to an Acome factory in Mortain. In late 2014, Travert was named rapporteur for the Macron Law against the wishes of Bruno Le Roux, the president of the Socialist group. He broke definitively with the Socialist Party in 2016, becoming a delegate of Macron's new party En Marche! on 26 October of that year.

In the 2017 French legislative elections, Travert was re-elected without opposition from the PS. His designated substitute was Grégory Galbadon. Travert was speculated to become the next president of the National Assembly or the La République En Marche! group but was ultimately not chosen for either position.

=== Regional councillor of Lower Normandy and Normandy ===
Travert was elected to the Regional Council of Lower Normandy in the 2010 French regional elections. He was the head of the Socialist electoral list in Manche for the 2015 French regional elections and joined the Regional Council of Normandy after the latter region was formed from a 2016 merger of Upper and Lower Normandy. Travert resigned from the regional council in December 2017.

=== Minister of Agriculture and Food ===
On 21 June 2017, Travert was named Minister of Agriculture and Food in the second government of Prime Minister Édouard Philippe. Travert succeeded Jacques Mézard, who was given the Territorial Cohesion portfolio to replace Richard Ferrand.

Travert's tenure was marked by conflict with Nicolas Hulot, the Minister of the Environmentalist and Solidary Transition. Less than a week after his nomination, Travert announced that he would revisit legislation banning neonicotinoid insecticides without exemptions from September 2018 onwards but was then contradicted by Hulot and Philippe. Travert also became the head of the Estates-General of Food, where he was accused of Libération of advancing an "agro-industrial and productivist" vision of the food industry. In November 2017, he deplored the failure of 28 European Union member states to agree on the future of glyphosate herbicide as "a defeat for Europe," while France had in fact vetoed proposals surrounding it—an action that Hulot said he was "proud" of. Travert then stated he was "happy" with a subsequent EU agreement renewing the legal status of glyphosate for five years, but was again contradicted by Macron and Philippe that same day.

In September 2017, ten LREM deputies led by Jean-Baptiste Moreau wrote to Macron, expressing their dissatisfaction with Travert for not involving them enough in the Estates-General of Food. Travert responded by apologizing to the deputies. He was again criticized in 2018 for supporting the Law on the Balance of Commercial Relations in the Agri-Food Sector, which was seen as mostly beneficial to agri-food companies by some observers. As a result, the minister was often attacked for being close to the agriculture lobby—an allegation that he strongly denied.

Travert was partially blamed for Hulot's resignation from government in 2018. Several weeks later, he was sacked in a cabinet reshuffle, although Macron ultimately praised him for his loyalty and promised that he would continue to trust him. L'Usine nouvelle commented that "his closeness to lobbies, his hesitations on glyphosate and the resignation of Nicolas Hulot were fatal" to his ministry.

=== Return to the National Assembly ===
Travert joined the National Defence and Armed Forces Committee upon his return to the National Assembly.

He was frequently included among potential general secretaries or successors to Christophe Castaner as the delegate-general of La République En Marche, with his knowledge of political systems and local elected officials being considered assets to the party. L'Opinion ultimately reported that Macron had "given him a position that does not appear in any official organizational chart: being in charge of rebuilding ties with local elected officials," a "large and difficult mission leading up to the May European elections, the 2020 municipal elections and the departmental elections the following year." To this end, Travert founded the organization La République Ensemble in January 2019 and became its president.

== Personal life ==
Travert is married and has two children. His wife is an English teacher.
