= Grégory Galbadon =

French politician

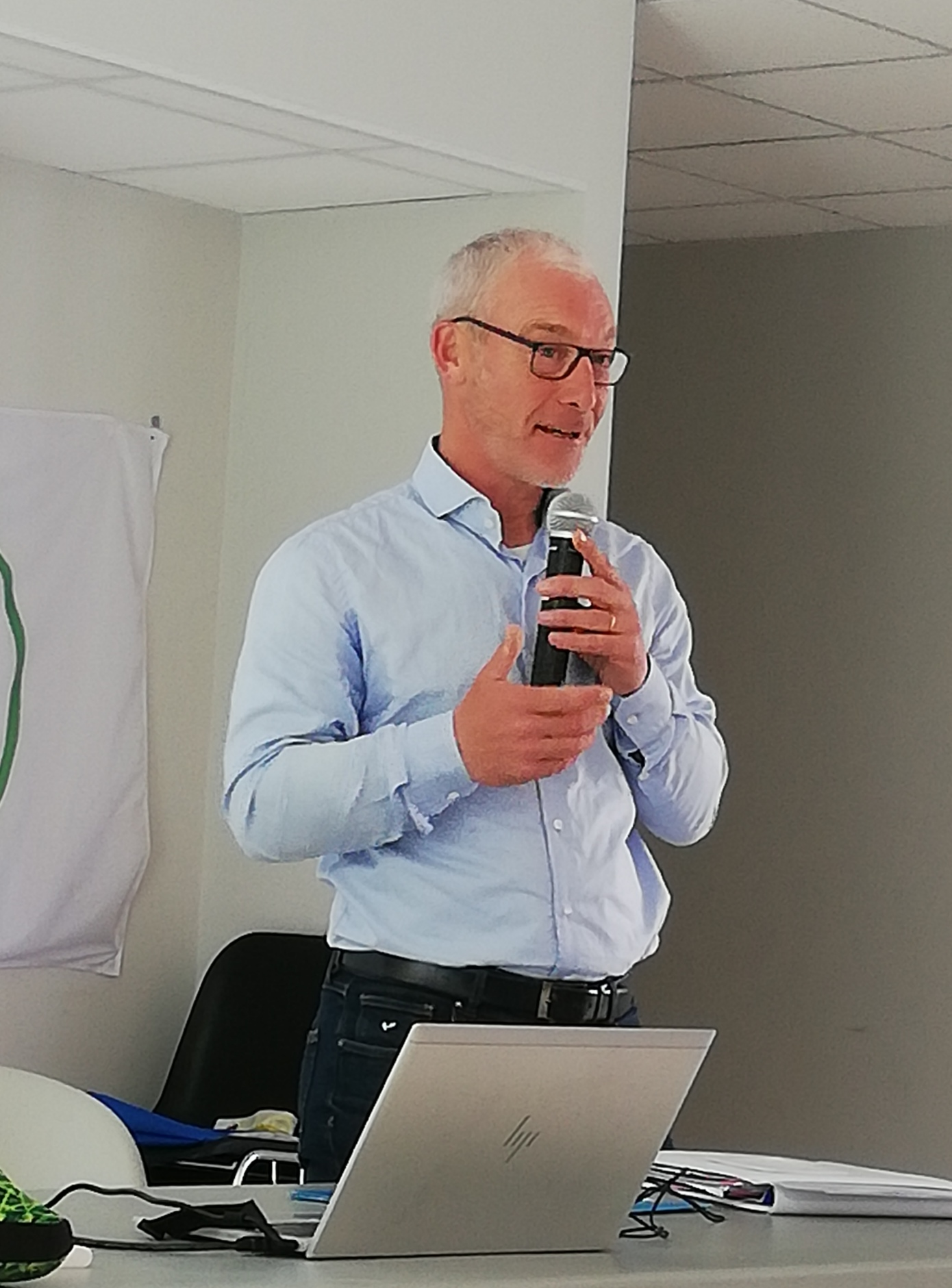

Mayor of Saint-Pierre-de-Coutances
- Incumbent
- Assumed office 23 May 2020
- Preceded by: Pascale Benoist

Member of the National Assembly for Manche's 3rd constituency
- In office 22 July 2017 – 16 November 2018
- Preceded by: Stéphane Travert
- Succeeded by: Stéphane Travert

Personal details
- Born: 21 January 1973 (age 53) Coutances, France
- Party: La République En Marche!

Grégory Galbadon (born 21 January 1973) is a French politician who represented Manche's 3rd constituency in the National Assembly from 2017 to 2018 as a member of En Marche.

== Political career ==
At the 2017 French legislative election, Galbadon was the substitute candidate for Stéphane Travert in Manche's 3rd constituency. Galbadon became a member of the National Assembly following Travert's appointment to the government as Minister of Agriculture on 22 July 2017. He left Parliament in 2018.
