= Manche's 3rd constituency =

Constituency of the National Assembly of France

3rd constituency of Manche
- inline Constituency of the National Assembly of France

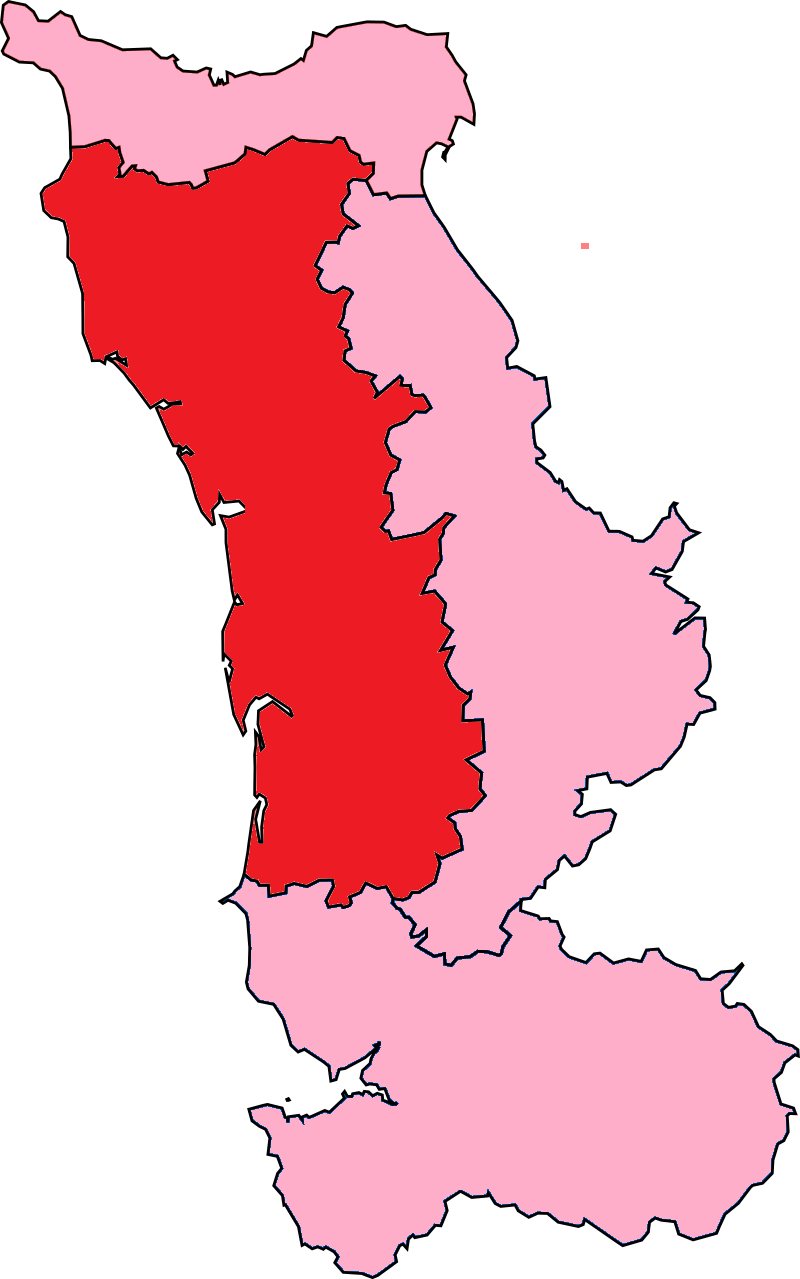
- Manche's 3rd Constituency shown within Manche
- Deputy: Stéphane Travert; RE
- Department: Manche
- Cantons: Barneville-Carteret, Bréhal, Bricquebec, Cerisy-la-Salle, Coutances, Gavray, La Haye-du-Puits, Les Pieux, Lessay, Montmartin-sur-Mer, Périers, Saint-Malo-de-la-Lande, Saint-Sauveur-Lendelin, Saint-Sauveur-le-Vicomte, Valognes
- Registered voters: 107801

The 3rd constituency of the Manche (French: Troisième circonscription de la Manche) is a French legislative constituency in the Manche département. Like the other 576 French constituencies, it elects one MP by using the two-round system, with a run-off if no candidate receives over 50% of the vote in the first round.

== Description ==
The 3rd Constituency of the Manche covers a large central part of the department, including a stretch of the Atlantic coastline. The constituency lies south of Cherbourg and west of Saint-Lô.

Prior 2012, the constituency consistently returned conservative deputies from the mainstream RPR and its successor party the UMP. At the 2012 election the seat swung to the Socialist Party candidate Stéphane Travert, who was subsequently elected on the En Marche! ticket at the 2017 election.

== Assembly members ==
Election	Member	Party	Notes
1958	Édouard Lebas	DVC	
1962	Henri Baudouin	UNR	
1967	Henri Baudouin	UDR	
1968	Henri Baudouin	UDR	
1973	Henri Baudouin	RI	
1978	Henri Baudouin	UDF	
1981	Henri Baudouin	UDF	
1986	Proportional representation – no election by constituency		
1988	Alain Cousin	RPR	
1993	Alain Cousin	RPR	
1997	Alain Cousin	RPR	
2002	Alain Cousin	UMP	
2007	Alain Cousin	UMP	
2012	Stéphane Travert	PS	
2017	Stéphane Travert	LREM	Appointed to the government
2017	Grégory Galbadon	LREM	Substitute for Galbadon
2018	Stéphane Travert	LREM	Left government
2022	Stéphane Travert	RE	

== Election results ==
=== 2024 ===
}}

Legislative Election 2024: Manche's 3rd constituency
Party	Candidate	Votes	%	±%
PCF (NFP)	Gaëlle Verove	15,191	20.01	−3.65
LR (UXD)	Pierre Giry	25,725	33.89	+19.44
DIV	Aurélien Verleyen	389	0.51	N/A
LO	Mansour Ayouti	629	0.83	N/A
DIV	Stéphanie Maubé	6,951	9.16	N/A
REC	Christian Guyot	842	1.11	−1.92
RE (Ensemble)	Stéphane Travert	25,232	33.24	−0.53
DIV	Yohann Quesnel	945	1.24	N/A
Turnout		75904	97.48	+46.45
Registered electors		111,098		
2nd round result
RE	Stéphane Travert	43,785	58.67	+25.43
LR	Pierre Giry	30,844	41.33	+7.44
Turnout		74629	95.06	−2.42
Registered electors		111 091		
RE hold		Swing		

=== 2022 ===
Legislative Election 2022: Manche's 3rd constituency
Party	Candidate	Votes	%	±%
LREM (Ensemble)	Stéphane Travert	18,678	33.77	-12.43
PCF (NUPÉS)	Gaëlle Verove	13,088	23.66	+4.84
RN	Carmen Masson	10,274	18.58	+5.99
LR (UDC)	Jean-René Binet	7,992	14.45	−4.49
REC	Nadège Daniel	1,677	3.03	N/A
DVD	Stéphane Lavalley	1,303	2.36	N/A
Others	N/A	2,295	4.15	
Turnout		55,307	51.03	+0.01
2nd round result
LREM (Ensemble)	Stéphane Travert	27,829	56.13	-10.03
PCF (NUPÉS)	Gaëlle Verove	21,751	43.87	N/A
Turnout		49,580	48.90	+9.91
LREM hold				

=== 2017 ===
Legislative Election 2017: Manche's 3rd constituency
Party	Candidate	Votes	%	±%
LREM	Stéphane Travert	25,422	46.20	
LR	Jean-Manuel Cousin	10,421	18.94	
FN	Carmen Masson	6,928	12.59	
LFI	Bernard Rebolle	5,743	10.44	
EELV	Laurent Huet	2,933	5.33	
PCF	Chantal Tambour	1,678	3.05	
Others	N/A	1,903		
Turnout		55,028	51.02	
2nd round result
LREM	Stéphane Travert	27,811	66.16	
LR	Jean-Manuel Cousin	14,224	33.84	
Turnout		42,035	38.99	
LREM gain from PS				

=== 2012 ===
Legislative Election 2012: Manche's 3rd constituency
Party	Candidate	Votes	%	±%
PS	Stéphane Travert	23,010	37.43	
UMP	Alain Cousin	21,094	34.32	
FN	Carmen Masson	7,178	11.68	
EELV	Marine Lemasson	2,424	3.94	
FG	Christian Duvinage	2,289	3.72	
DVD	Eric De Laforcade	2,086	3.39	
AC	Gabriel Daube	1,993	3.24	
Others	N/A	1,393		
Turnout		61,467	58.07	
2nd round result
PS	Stéphane Travert	32,357	52.38	
UMP	Alain Cousin	29,414	47.62	
Turnout		61,771	58.36	
PS gain from UMP				
