= Laroquevieille =

Commune in Auvergne-Rhône-Alpes, France

- Commune
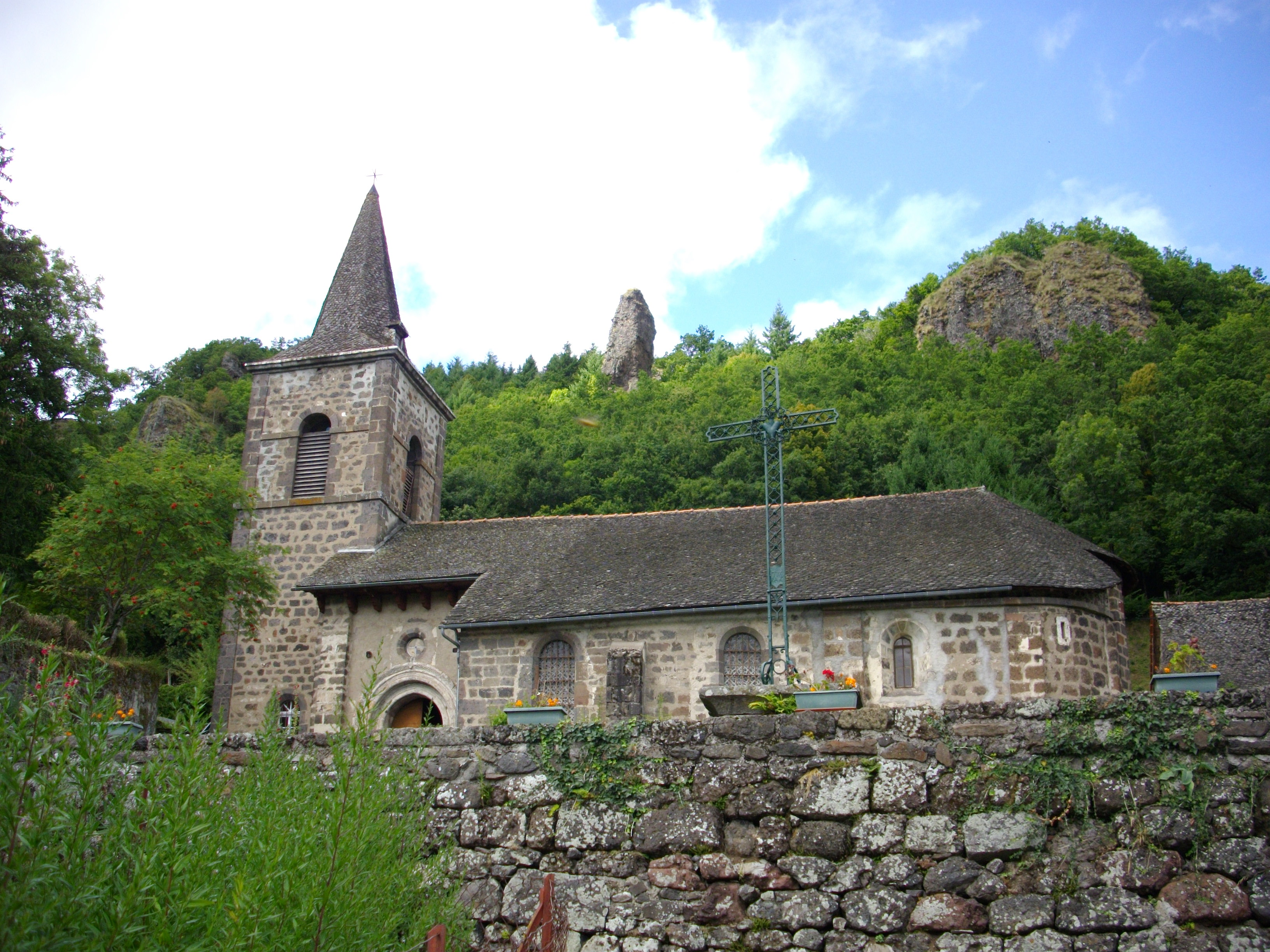
- The church of Saint-Pardoux in Laroquevieille
- Location of Laroquevieille
- Location within France Location within Auvergne-Rhône-Alpes
- Coordinates: 45°01′16″N 2°31′48″E
- Country: France
- Region: Auvergne-Rhône-Alpes
- Department: Cantal
- Arrondissement: Aurillac
- Canton: Naucelles
- Intercommunality: CA Aurillac Agglomération

Government
  - Mayor (2020–2026): Jean-Louis Prax
- Area^{1}: 15.68 km^{2} (6.05 sq mi)
- Elevation: 720 m (2,360 ft)
- Highest elevation: 1,140 m (3,740 ft)
- Lowest elevation: 657 m (2,156 ft)
- Population (2023): 350
  - Density: 22/km^{2} (58/sq mi)
- Time zone: UTC+01:00 (CET)
  - Summer (DST): UTC+02:00 (CEST)
- INSEE/Postal code: 15095 /15250
- ^{1} French Land Register data, which excludes lakes, ponds, glaciers > 1 km^{2} (0.386 sq mi or 247 acres) and river estuaries.

Laroquevieille (French pronunciation: [laʁɔk.vjɛj]; Occitan: La Ròca Vielha) is a commune in the Cantal department in south-central France.

== Population ==
Historical population
Year	Pop.	±% p.a.
1968	504	—
1975	465	−1.14%
1982	440	−0.79%
1990	402	−1.12%
1999	324	−2.37%
2007	358	+1.26%
2012	357	−0.06%
2017	353	−0.23%
2023	350	−0.14%
Source: INSEE

== See also ==
- Communes of the Cantal department
