= Sansac-de-Marmiesse =

Commune in Auvergne-Rhône-Alpes, France

- Commune
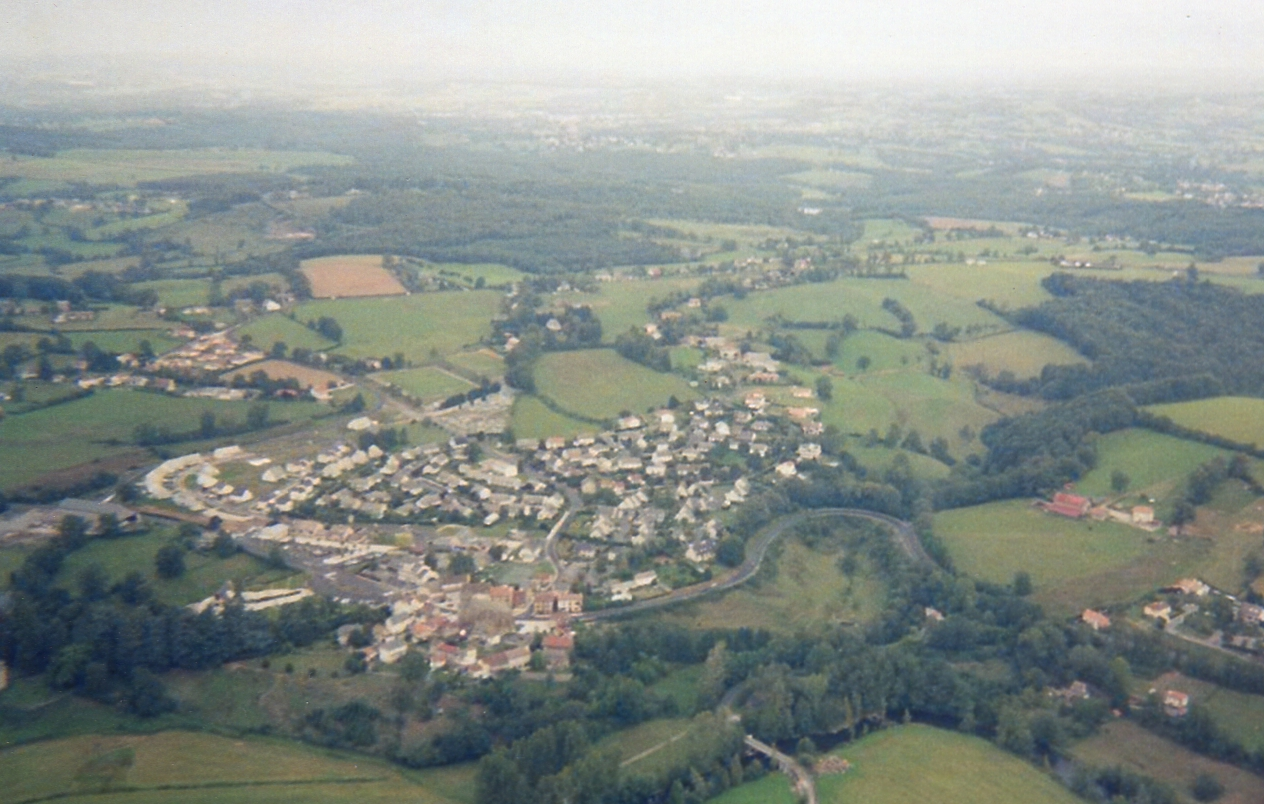
- An aerial view of Sansac-de-Marmiesse
- Location of Sansac-de-Marmiesse
- Location within France Location within Auvergne-Rhône-Alpes
- Coordinates: 44°53′05″N 2°20′54″E
- Country: France
- Region: Auvergne-Rhône-Alpes
- Department: Cantal
- Arrondissement: Aurillac
- Canton: Maurs
- Intercommunality: CA Aurillac Agglomération

Government
  - Mayor (2020–2026): Michel Baissac
- Area^{1}: 14.35 km^{2} (5.54 sq mi)
- Highest elevation: 724 m (2,375 ft)
- Lowest elevation: 546 m (1,791 ft)
- Population (2023): 1,395
  - Density: 97.21/km^{2} (251.8/sq mi)
- Time zone: UTC+01:00 (CET)
  - Summer (DST): UTC+02:00 (CEST)
- INSEE/Postal code: 15221 /15130
- ^{1} French Land Register data, which excludes lakes, ponds, glaciers > 1 km^{2} (0.386 sq mi or 247 acres) and river estuaries.

Sansac-de-Marmiesse (French pronunciation: [sɑ̃sak də maʁmjɛs]; Occitan: Sansac de Marmiesse) is a commune in the Cantal department in south-central France.

== Population ==
Historical population
Year	Pop.	±% p.a.
1968	349	—
1975	523	+5.95%
1982	829	+6.80%
1990	1,076	+3.31%
1999	1,101	+0.26%
2007	1,256	+1.66%
2012	1,320	+1.00%
2017	1,360	+0.60%
2023	1,395	+0.42%
Source: INSEE

== See also ==
- Communes of the Cantal department
