= Saint-Illide =

Commune in Auvergne-Rhône-Alpes, France

- Commune
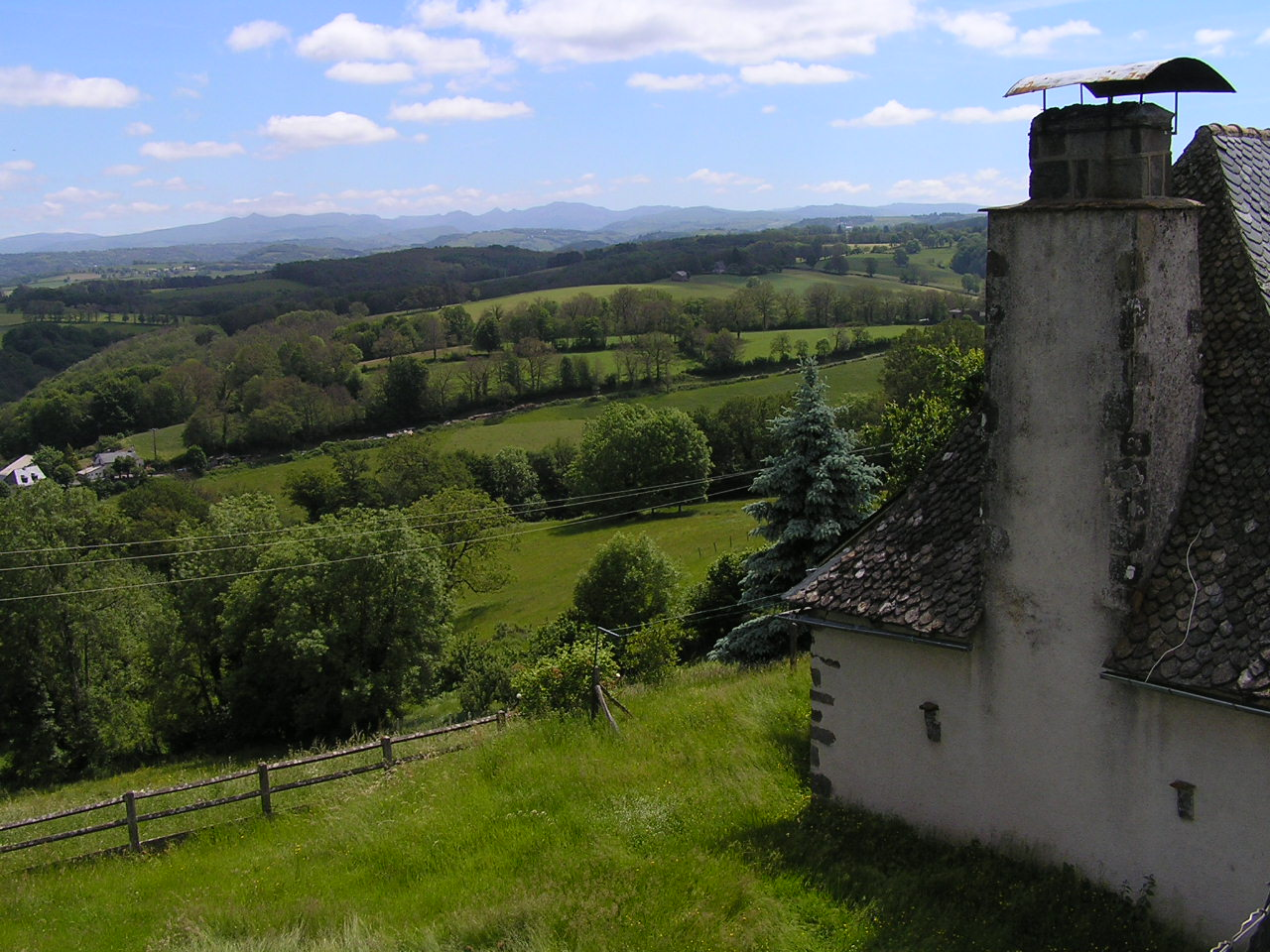
- The Monts du Cantal on the horizon, seen from Saint-Illide, with a typical house on the right

- Coat of arms
- Location of Saint-Illide
- Location within France Location within Auvergne-Rhône-Alpes
- Coordinates: 45°03′45″N 2°18′57″E
- Country: France
- Region: Auvergne-Rhône-Alpes
- Department: Cantal
- Arrondissement: Aurillac
- Canton: Naucelles
- Intercommunality: Pays de Salers

Government
  - Mayor (2020–2026): Jean-Pierre Cinqualbres
- Area^{1}: 39.71 km^{2} (15.33 sq mi)
- Elevation: 625 m (2,051 ft)
- Highest elevation: 733 m (2,405 ft)
- Lowest elevation: 424 m (1,391 ft)
- Population (2023): 656
  - Density: 16.5/km^{2} (42.8/sq mi)
- Time zone: UTC+01:00 (CET)
  - Summer (DST): UTC+02:00 (CEST)
- INSEE/Postal code: 15191 /15310
- ^{1} French Land Register data, which excludes lakes, ponds, glaciers > 1 km^{2} (0.386 sq mi or 247 acres) and river estuaries.

Saint-Illide is a commune in the Cantal department in south-central France.

== Population ==
Historical population
Year	Pop.	±% p.a.
1968	959	—
1975	802	−2.52%
1982	717	−1.59%
1990	701	−0.28%
1999	668	−0.53%
2007	667	−0.02%
2012	648	−0.58%
2017	656	+0.25%
2023	656	+0.00%
Source: INSEE

== See also ==
- Communes of the Cantal department
