= Canton of Naucelles =

Coordinates: 44.96°N 2.42°E

- Canton
- Situation of the canton of Naucelles in the department of Cantal
- Country: France
- Region: Auvergne-Rhône-Alpes
- Department: Cantal
- No. of communes: {{{nbcomm}}}
- Population (2023): 10,369
- INSEE code: 1508

The canton of Naucelles is an administrative division of the Cantal department, southern France. It was created at the French canton reorganisation which came into effect in March 2015. Its seat is in Naucelles.

It consists of the following communes:

1. Besse
2. Crandelles
3. Freix-Anglards
4. Girgols
5. Jussac
6. Laroquevieille
7. Marmanhac
8. Naucelles
9. Reilhac
10. Saint-Cernin
11. Saint-Chamant
12. Saint-Cirgues-de-Malbert
13. Saint-Illide
14. Saint-Projet-de-Salers
15. Teissières-de-Cornet
16. Tournemire
