= Saint-Simon, Cantal =

Commune in Auvergne-Rhône-Alpes, France

Saint-Simon
- Commune
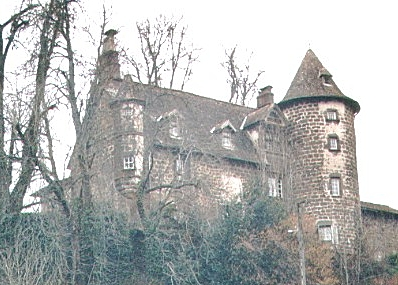
- Chateau Oyez
- Location of Saint-Simon
- Location within France Location within Auvergne-Rhône-Alpes
- Coordinates: 44°57′50″N 2°29′27″E
- Country: France
- Region: Auvergne-Rhône-Alpes
- Department: Cantal
- Arrondissement: Aurillac
- Canton: Vic-sur-Cère
- Intercommunality: CA Aurillac Agglomération

Government
  - Mayor (2020–2026): Nathalie Gardes
- Area^{1}: 27.27 km^{2} (10.53 sq mi)
- Elevation: 670 m (2,200 ft)
- Highest elevation: 1,031 m (3,383 ft)
- Lowest elevation: 655 m (2,149 ft)
- Population (2023): 1,159
  - Density: 42.50/km^{2} (110.1/sq mi)
- Time zone: UTC+01:00 (CET)
  - Summer (DST): UTC+02:00 (CEST)
- INSEE/Postal code: 15215 /15130
- ^{1} French Land Register data, which excludes lakes, ponds, glaciers > 1 km^{2} (0.386 sq mi or 247 acres) and river estuaries.

Saint-Simon (French pronunciation: [sɛ̃ simɔ̃]; Auvergnat: Sant Simon) is a commune in the Cantal department in south-central France.

The medieval town of Belliac, located near the present-day Saint-Simon, was the birthplace (in 946) of the prolific scholar Gerbert d'Aurillac, who became Pope Sylvester II, the first of the French popes.

== Population ==
Historical population
Year	Pop.	±% p.a.
1968	842	—
1975	1,007	+2.59%
1982	959	−0.70%
1990	989	+0.39%
1999	1,018	+0.32%
2007	1,079	+0.73%
2012	1,123	+0.80%
2017	1,140	+0.30%
2023	1,159	+0.28%
Source: INSEE

== See also ==
- Communes of the Cantal department
