= Girgols =

Commune in Auvergne-Rhône-Alpes, France

- Commune
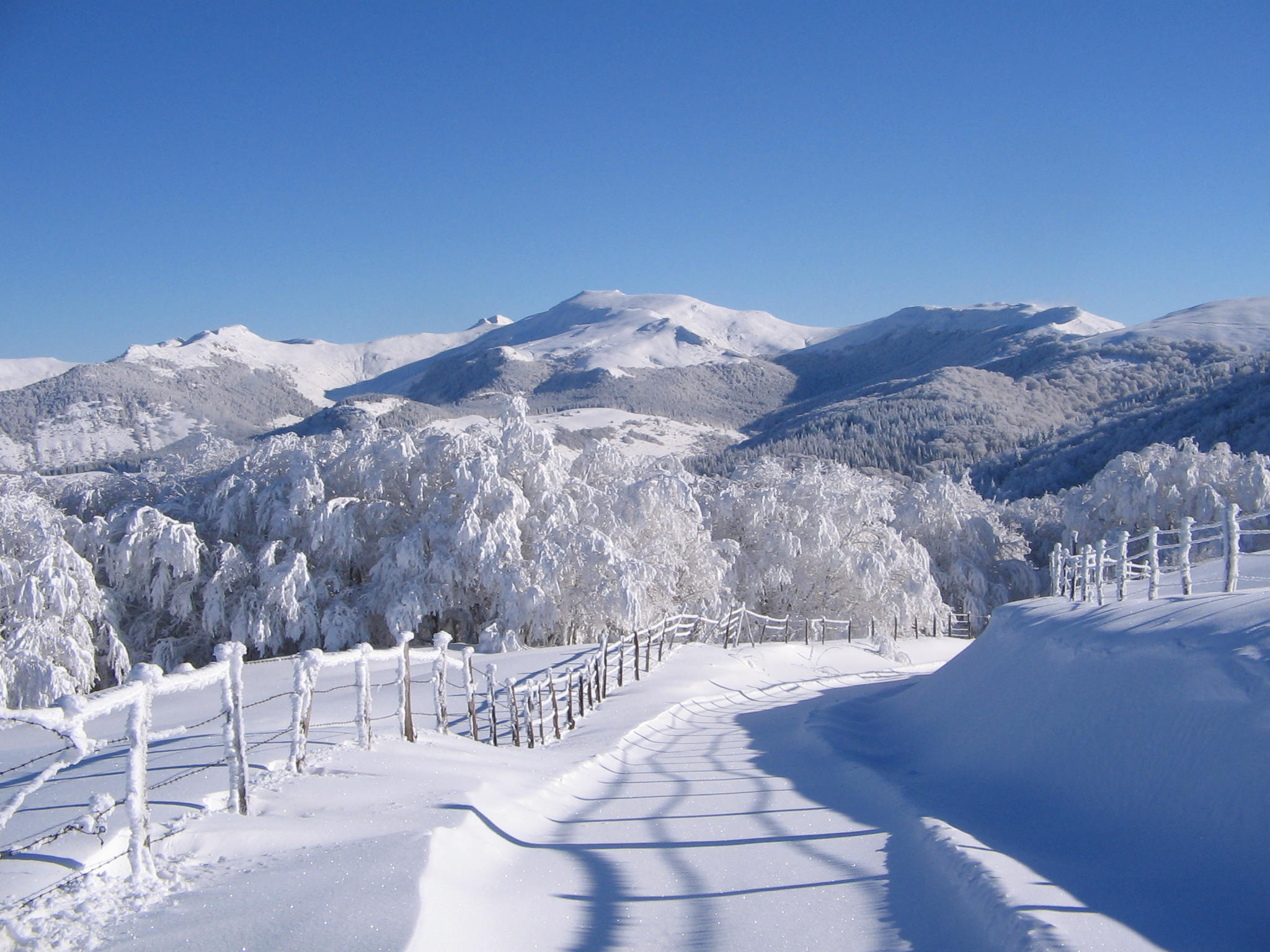
- The Col de Légal, above the commune of Girgols
- Location of Girgols
- Location within France Location within Auvergne-Rhône-Alpes
- Coordinates: 45°02′21″N 2°28′56″E
- Country: France
- Region: Auvergne-Rhône-Alpes
- Department: Cantal
- Arrondissement: Aurillac
- Canton: Naucelles
- Intercommunality: Pays de Salers

Government
  - Mayor (2020–2026): Christian Lussert
- Area^{1}: 12.62 km^{2} (4.87 sq mi)
- Elevation: 900 m (3,000 ft)
- Highest elevation: 1,228 m (4,029 ft)
- Lowest elevation: 786 m (2,579 ft)
- Population (2023): 70
  - Density: 5.5/km^{2} (14/sq mi)
- Time zone: UTC+01:00 (CET)
  - Summer (DST): UTC+02:00 (CEST)
- INSEE/Postal code: 15075 /15310
- ^{1} French Land Register data, which excludes lakes, ponds, glaciers > 1 km^{2} (0.386 sq mi or 247 acres) and river estuaries.

Girgols is a commune in the Cantal department in south-central France.

== Population ==
Historical population
Year	Pop.	±% p.a.
1968	151	—
1975	115	−3.82%
1982	100	−1.98%
1990	84	−2.16%
1999	73	−1.55%
2007	76	+0.50%
2012	76	+0.00%
2017	76	+0.00%
2023	70	−1.36%
Source: INSEE

== See also ==
- Communes of the Cantal department
