= Alain Cousin =

French politician

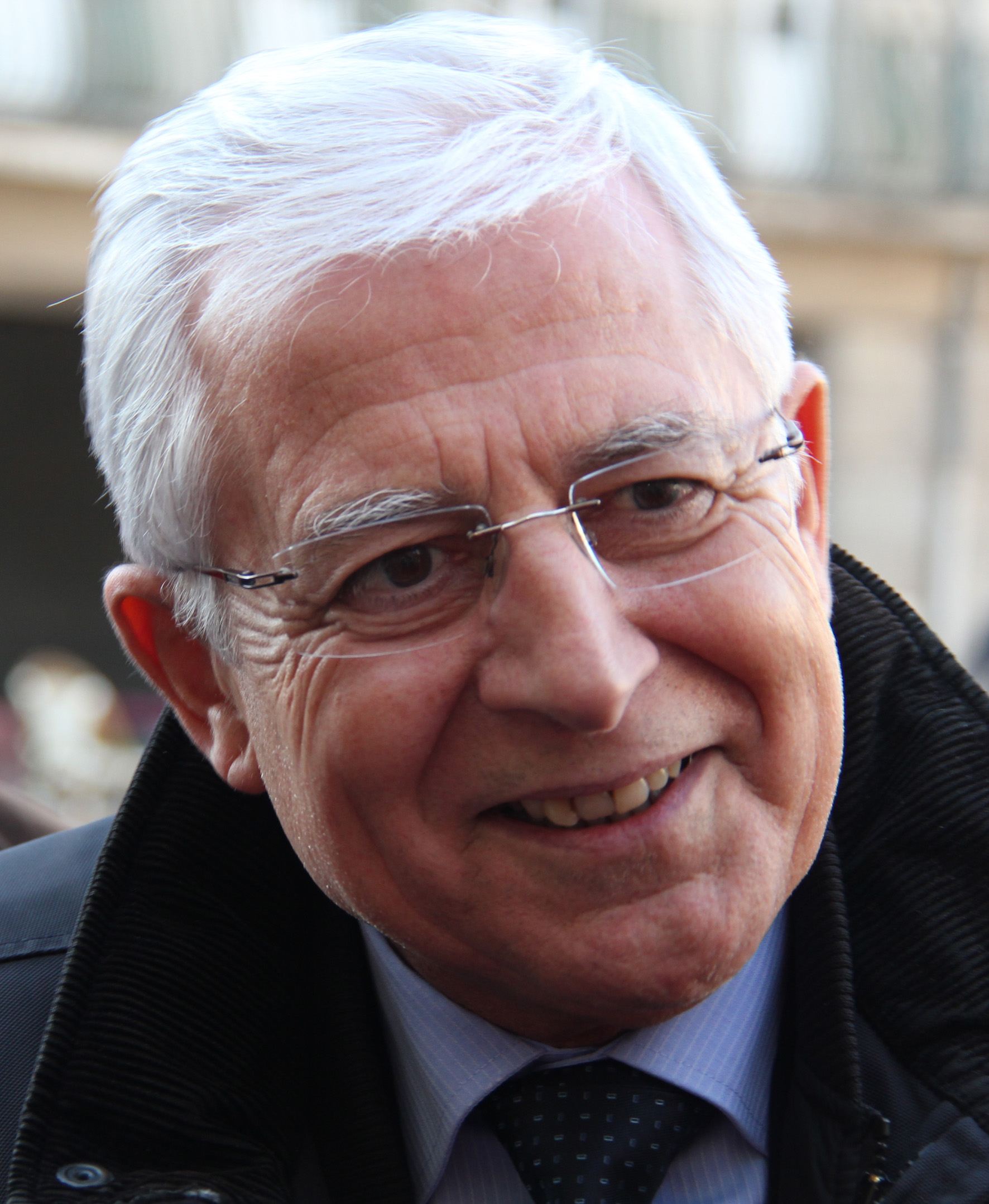
- Alain Cousin in 2012

Member of the National Assembly for Manche's 3rd constituency
- In office 12 June 1988 – 25 June 2012
- Preceded by: None
- Succeeded by: Stéphane Travert

Personal details
- Born: 8 April 1947 (age 78) Périers, France
- Party: RPR; UMP

Alain Cousin (born 8 April 1947) is a member of the National Assembly of France. He represents the Manche department, and is a member of the Union for a Popular Movement.
