= Saint-Cernin, Cantal =

Commune in Auvergne-Rhône-Alpes, France

Saint-Cernin
- Commune
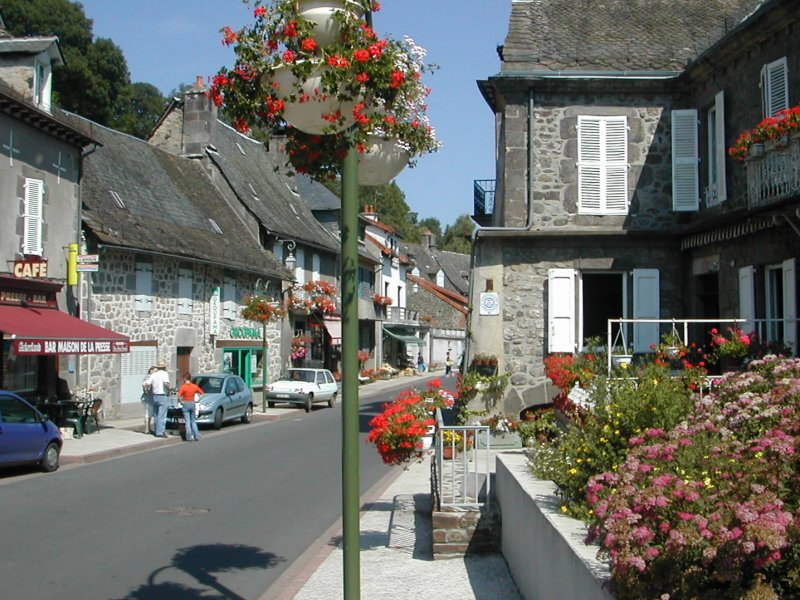
- A view within the village of Saint-Cernin
- Location of Saint-Cernin
- Location within France Location within Auvergne-Rhône-Alpes
- Coordinates: 45°03′34″N 2°25′17″E
- Country: France
- Region: Auvergne-Rhône-Alpes
- Department: Cantal
- Arrondissement: Aurillac
- Canton: Naucelles
- Intercommunality: Pays de Salers

Government
  - Mayor (2020–2026): André Dujols
- Area^{1}: 46.75 km^{2} (18.05 sq mi)
- Elevation: 760 m (2,490 ft)
- Highest elevation: 985 m (3,232 ft)
- Lowest elevation: 556 m (1,824 ft)
- Population (2023): 1,039
  - Density: 22.22/km^{2} (57.56/sq mi)
- Time zone: UTC+01:00 (CET)
  - Summer (DST): UTC+02:00 (CEST)
- INSEE/Postal code: 15175 /15310
- ^{1} French Land Register data, which excludes lakes, ponds, glaciers > 1 km^{2} (0.386 sq mi or 247 acres) and river estuaries.

Saint-Cernin (French pronunciation: [sɛ̃ sɛʁnɛ̃]; Occitan: Sant Sarnin) is a commune in the Cantal department in south-central France.

== Population ==
Historical population
| Year | Pop. | ±% p.a. |
|---|---|---|
| 1968 | 1,448 | — |
| 1975 | 1,314 | −1.38% |
| 1982 | 1,245 | −0.77% |
| 1990 | 1,164 | −0.84% |
| 1999 | 1,128 | −0.35% |
| 2007 | 1,070 | −0.66% |
| 2012 | 1,106 | +0.66% |
| 2017 | 1,072 | −0.62% |
| 2023 | 1,039 | −0.52% |
Source: INSEE

== See also ==
- Communes of the Cantal department
