= List of intercommunalities of the Cantal department =

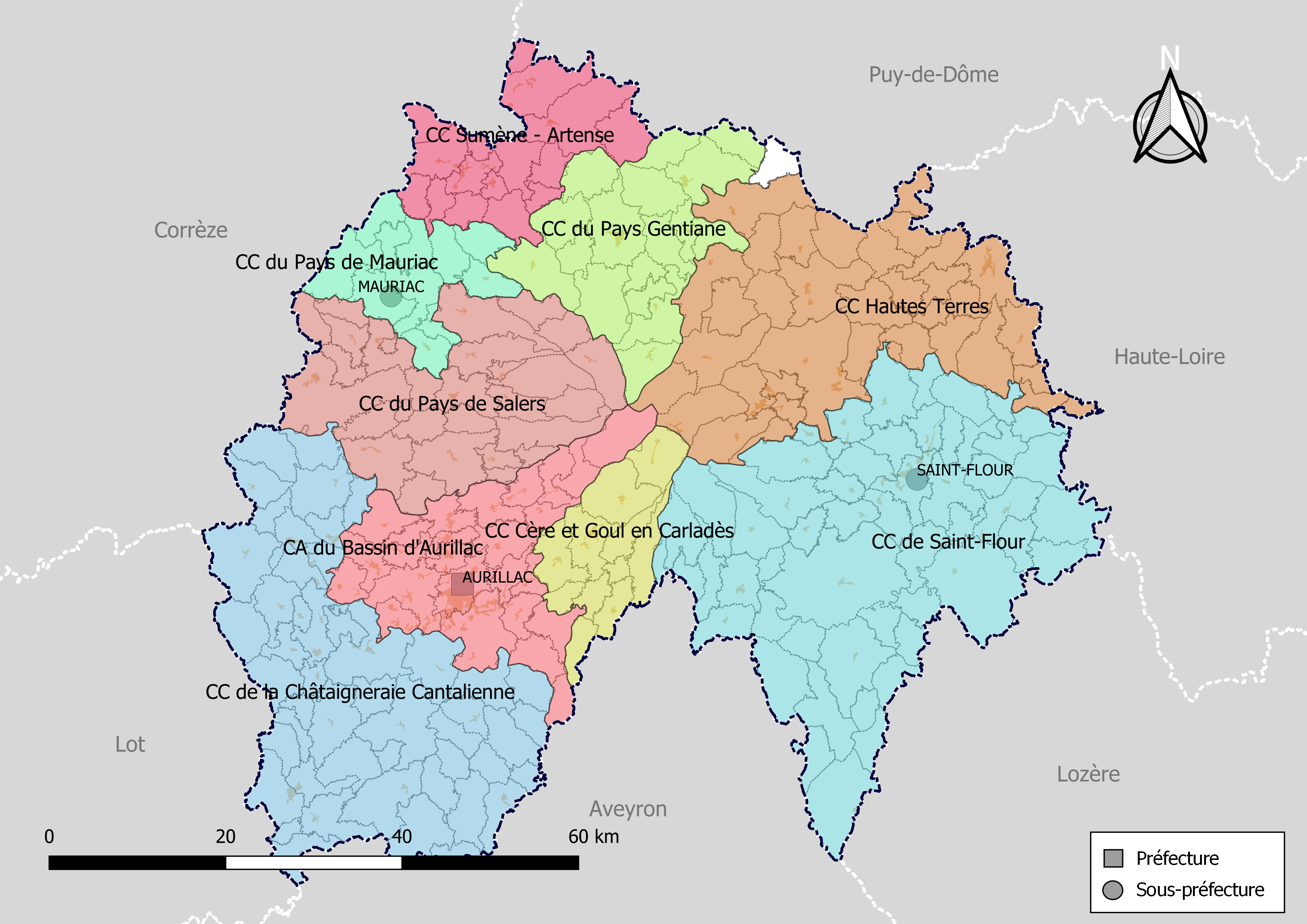
Map of EPCI's in the Cantal department on 1 January 2019.

Since 1 January 2020, the Cantal department of France has counted nine public establishments for intercommunal cooperation (EPCI) with their administrative seats in the department, one agglomerated community and 8 communauté de communes. One additional commune, Montgreleix, is part of the communauté de communes du Massif du Sancy whose administrative seat is located in the Puy-de-Dôme department.

== History ==
The departmental commission on intercommunal co-operation (CDCI) of the Cantal department met to examine the draft departmental plan for inter-municipal cooperation. On 7 March 2017, the CDCI approved, after examination of amendments, a plan that provided for six intercommunalities for the entirety of the Cantal department from 1 January 2017. This plan was stopped by the Prefect of Cantal on 30 March 2016.

Resistance from numerous communauté de communes to the project to fuse intercommunalities led to abandonment of part of the legislative project. Finally, on 1 January 2017, the intercommunalities of the Cantal department numbered a total of nine moving forward.

On 1 January 2019, four communes left the Hautes Terres Communauté to join the communauté de communes du Pays Gentiane.

== List of intercommunalities ==
Legal form	Name	SIREN number	Date of creation	Number of communes	Population (2018/2019)	Area (km^{2})	Density (per km^{2})	Seat	President	Ref.
Communauté d'agglomeration	Aurillac Agglomération	241500230	22 November 1999	25	53,407	491.90	109	Aurillac	Pierre Mathonier	
Communauté de communes	Saint-Flour Communauté	200066660	1 January 2017	53	23,515	1,366.30	17	Saint-Flour	Céline Charriaud	
Communauté de communes	CC de la Châtaigneraie Cantalienne	200066678	1 January 2017	50	21,099	1,061.10	20	Saint-Mamet-la-Salvetat	Michel Teyssedou	
Communauté de communes	Hautes Terres Communauté	200066637	1 January 2017	35	11,554	899.80	13	Murat	Didier Achalme	
Communauté de communes	CC du Pays de Salers	241501139	19 December 2003	27	8,466	642.90	13	Salers	Pierre Mennesson	
Communauté de communes	CC Sumène Artense	241501055	30 December 1999	16	8,343	324.60	26	Champs-sur-Tarentaine-Marchal	Marc Maisoneuvre	
Communauté de communes	CC du Pays Gentiane	241500255	29 December 1993	17	6,720	460.20	15	Riom-ès-Montagnes	Valérie Cabécas	
Communauté de communes	CC du Pays de Mauriac	241500271	4 November 1994	11	6,627	224	30	Mauriac	Jean-Pierre Soulier	
Communauté de communes	CC Cère et Goul en Carladès	241501089	12 October 2000	11	4,916	237.50	21	Vic-sur-Cère	Dominique Bru	
Intercommunalities with their administrative seats outside of the Cantal department
Communauté de communes	CC du Massif du Sancy	246300966	10 December 1999	20 (including 1 in Cantal)	9,646	605.70	16	Mont-Dore (Puy-de-Dôme)	Lionel Gay	
