= Freix-Anglards =

Commune in Auvergne-Rhône-Alpes, France

- Commune
- Location of Freix-Anglards
- Location within France Location within Auvergne-Rhône-Alpes
- Coordinates: 45°01′20″N 2°23′12″E
- Country: France
- Region: Auvergne-Rhône-Alpes
- Department: Cantal
- Arrondissement: Aurillac
- Canton: Naucelles
- Intercommunality: Pays de Salers

Government
  - Mayor (2020–2026): Patrice Falies
- Area^{1}: 17.69 km^{2} (6.83 sq mi)
- Elevation: 800 m (2,600 ft)
- Highest elevation: 842 m (2,762 ft)
- Lowest elevation: 591 m (1,939 ft)
- Population (2023): 215
  - Density: 12.2/km^{2} (31.5/sq mi)
- Time zone: UTC+01:00 (CET)
  - Summer (DST): UTC+02:00 (CEST)
- INSEE/Postal code: 15072 /15310
- ^{1} French Land Register data, which excludes lakes, ponds, glaciers > 1 km^{2} (0.386 sq mi or 247 acres) and river estuaries.

Freix-Anglards is a commune in the Cantal department in south-central France.

== Population ==
Historical population
Year	Pop.	±% p.a.
1968	427	—
1975	369	−2.06%
1982	328	−1.67%
1990	274	−2.22%
1999	195	−3.71%
2007	183	−0.79%
2012	205	+2.30%
2017	218	+1.24%
2023	215	−0.23%
Source: INSEE

== See also ==
- Communes of the Cantal department
