= Crandelles =

Commune in Auvergne-Rhône-Alpes, France

- Commune
- Location of Crandelles
- Location within France Location within Auvergne-Rhône-Alpes
- Coordinates: 44°57′34″N 2°21′01″E
- Country: France
- Region: Auvergne-Rhône-Alpes
- Department: Cantal
- Arrondissement: Aurillac
- Canton: Naucelles
- Intercommunality: CA Aurillac Agglomération

Government
  - Mayor (2020–2026): Jean-Louis Vidal
- Area^{1}: 12.46 km^{2} (4.81 sq mi)
- Elevation: 620 m (2,030 ft)
- Highest elevation: 744 m (2,441 ft)
- Lowest elevation: 569 m (1,867 ft)
- Population (2023): 872
  - Density: 70.0/km^{2} (181/sq mi)
- Time zone: UTC+01:00 (CET)
  - Summer (DST): UTC+02:00 (CEST)
- INSEE/Postal code: 15056 /15250
- ^{1} French Land Register data, which excludes lakes, ponds, glaciers > 1 km^{2} (0.386 sq mi or 247 acres) and river estuaries.

Crandelles (French pronunciation: [kʁɑ̃dɛl]; Occitan: Crandèlas) is a commune in the Cantal department in south-central France.

== Population ==
Historical population
Year	Pop.	±% p.a.
1968	338	—
1975	346	+0.33%
1982	470	+4.47%
1990	560	+2.21%
1999	598	+0.73%
2007	642	+0.89%
2012	738	+2.83%
2017	845	+2.74%
2023	872	+0.53%
Source: INSEE

== See also ==
- Communes of the Cantal department
