= Château de Marqueyssac =

Castle in Vézac, France

Coordinates: 44°49′26″N 1°9′46″E

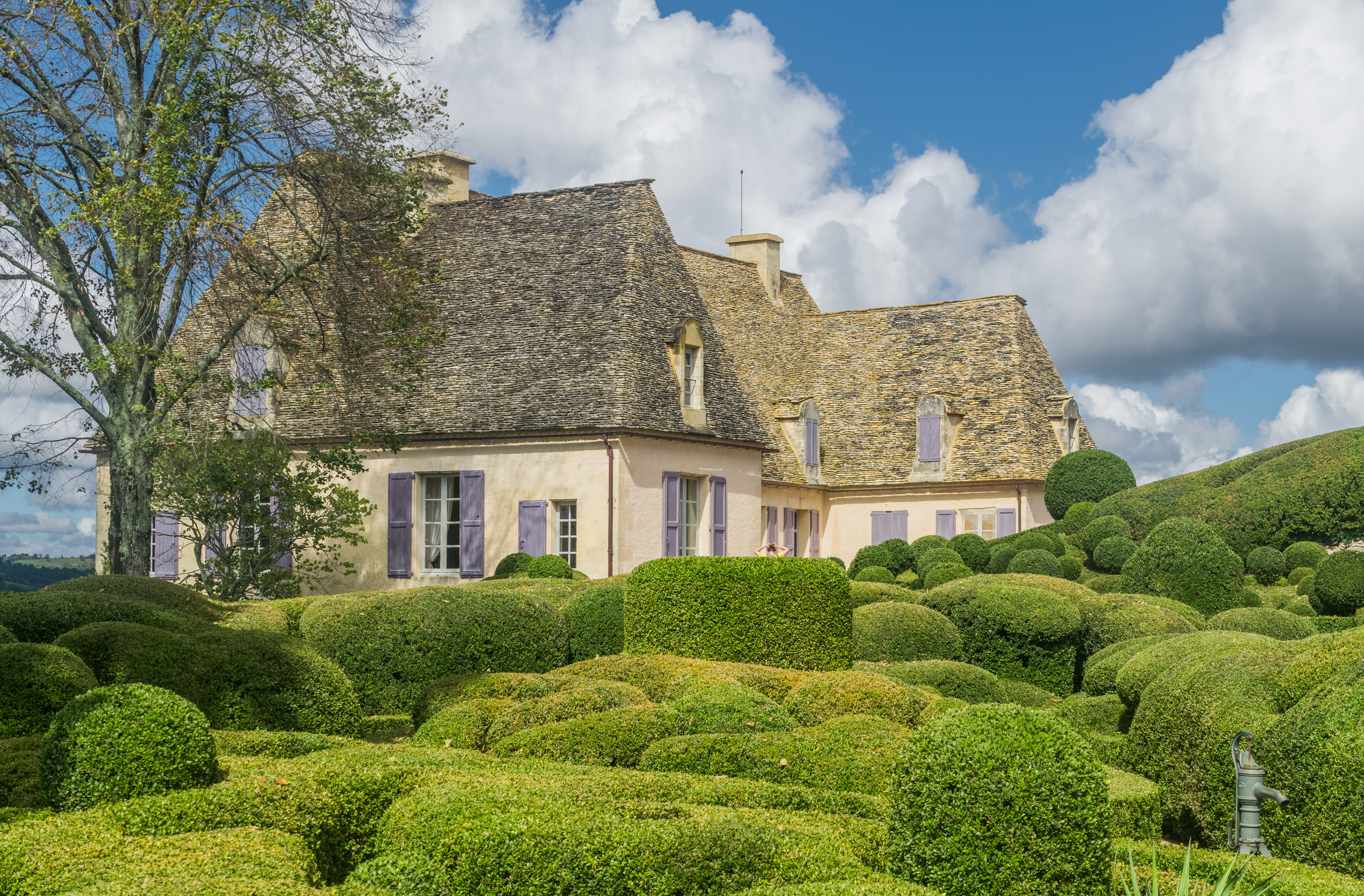
A view of the Château de Marqueyssac

The Château de Marqueyssac (French pronunciation: [ʃato d(ə) maʁkesak]), known simply as Marqueyssac, is a 17th-century château with notable gardens located at Vézac, in the Dordogne department in France. The château was built at the end of the 17th century by Bertrand Vernet de Marqueyssac, Counsellor to King Louis XIV, on cliffs overlooking the Dordogne Valley. The original jardin à la française was attributed to a pupil of André Le Nôtre, and featured terraces, alleys, and a kitchen garden surrounding the château.

== History ==
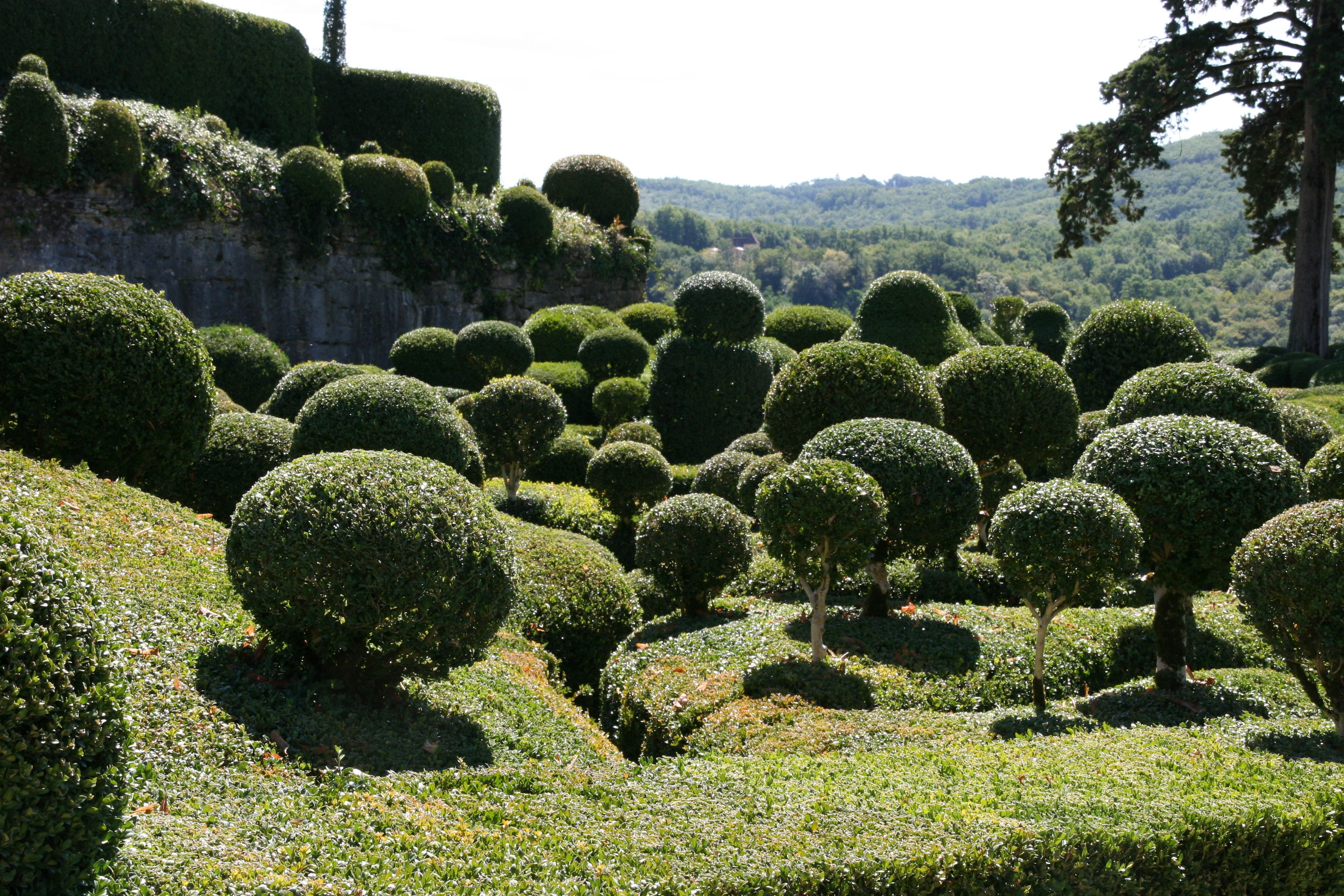
Vegetation in the Jardins de Marqueyssac

Between 1830 and 1840, Julien Bessières constructed a chapel and a grand alley one hundred metres long for horseback rides.

In the 1860s, the new owner, Julien de Cerval, began to plant thousands of boxwood trees – today there are over 150,000 – and had them carved in fantastic shapes, many in groups of rounded shapes like flocks of sheep. He also added linden trees, cypress trees, and stone pine from Italy, and introduced the cyclamen from Naples. Following the romantic style, he built rustic structures, redesigned the parterres, and laid out five kilometres of walks.

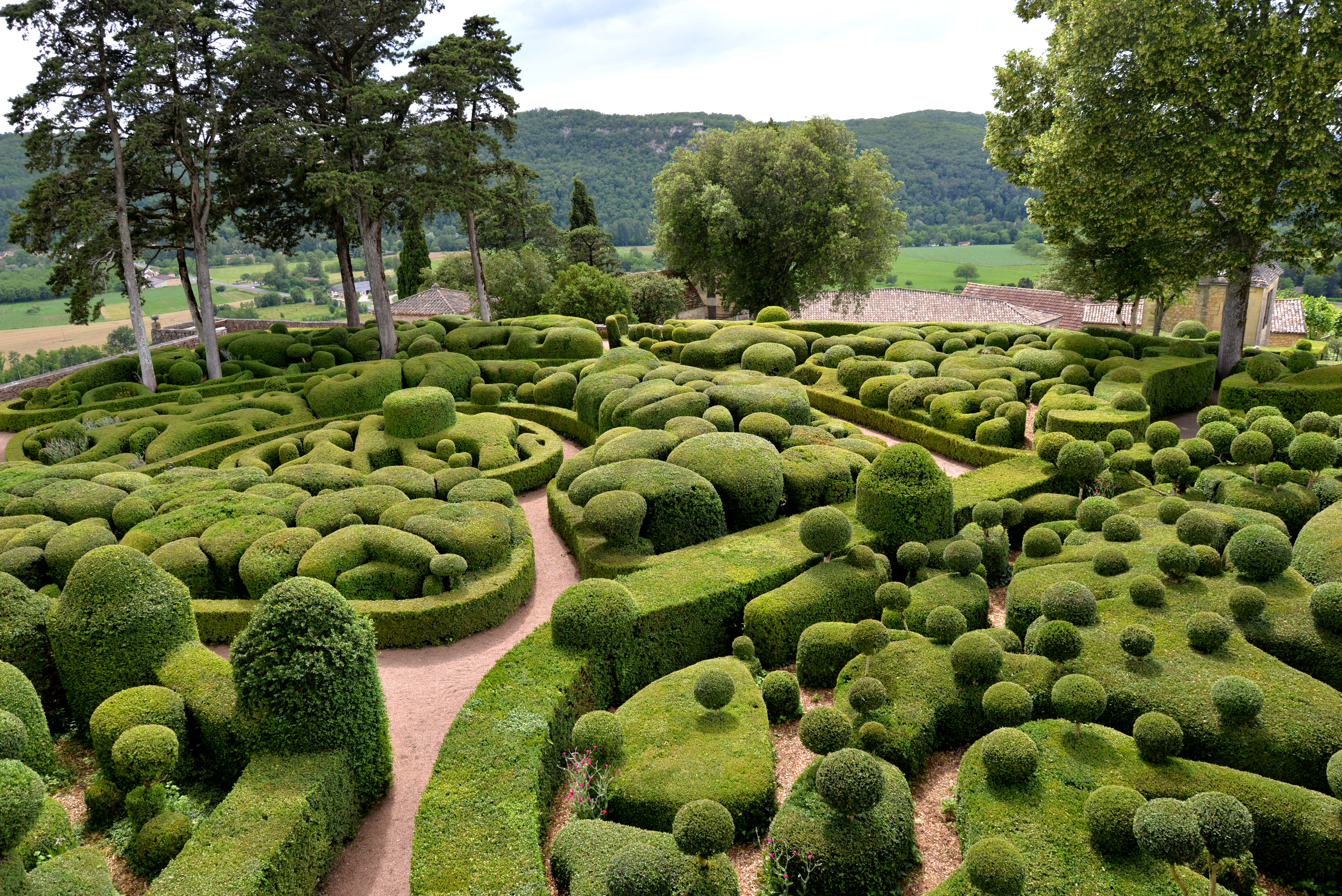
General view of the Jardins de Marqueyssac

In the second half 20th century the house was rarely occupied and the gardens were not well maintained. Beginning in 1996, a new owner, Kléber Rossillon, restored the gardens to their old character and added some new features including an alley of santolina and rosemary and, in the romantic spirit of the 19th century, a course of water descending from the belvedere and ending in a cascade. The gardens were opened to the public in 1996.

Since 1997, the gardens have been classified amongst the Notable Gardens of France by the Committee of Parks and Gardens of the Ministry of Culture.

In spring 2025 The New York Times panel selected it as one of the 25 best gardens in the world

== Bibliography ==
- Yves-Marie Allain and Janine Christiany, L'art des jardins en Europe, Citadelle & Mazenod Publishers, Paris, 2006.
