= Jussac =

Commune in Auvergne-Rhône-Alpes, France

- Commune
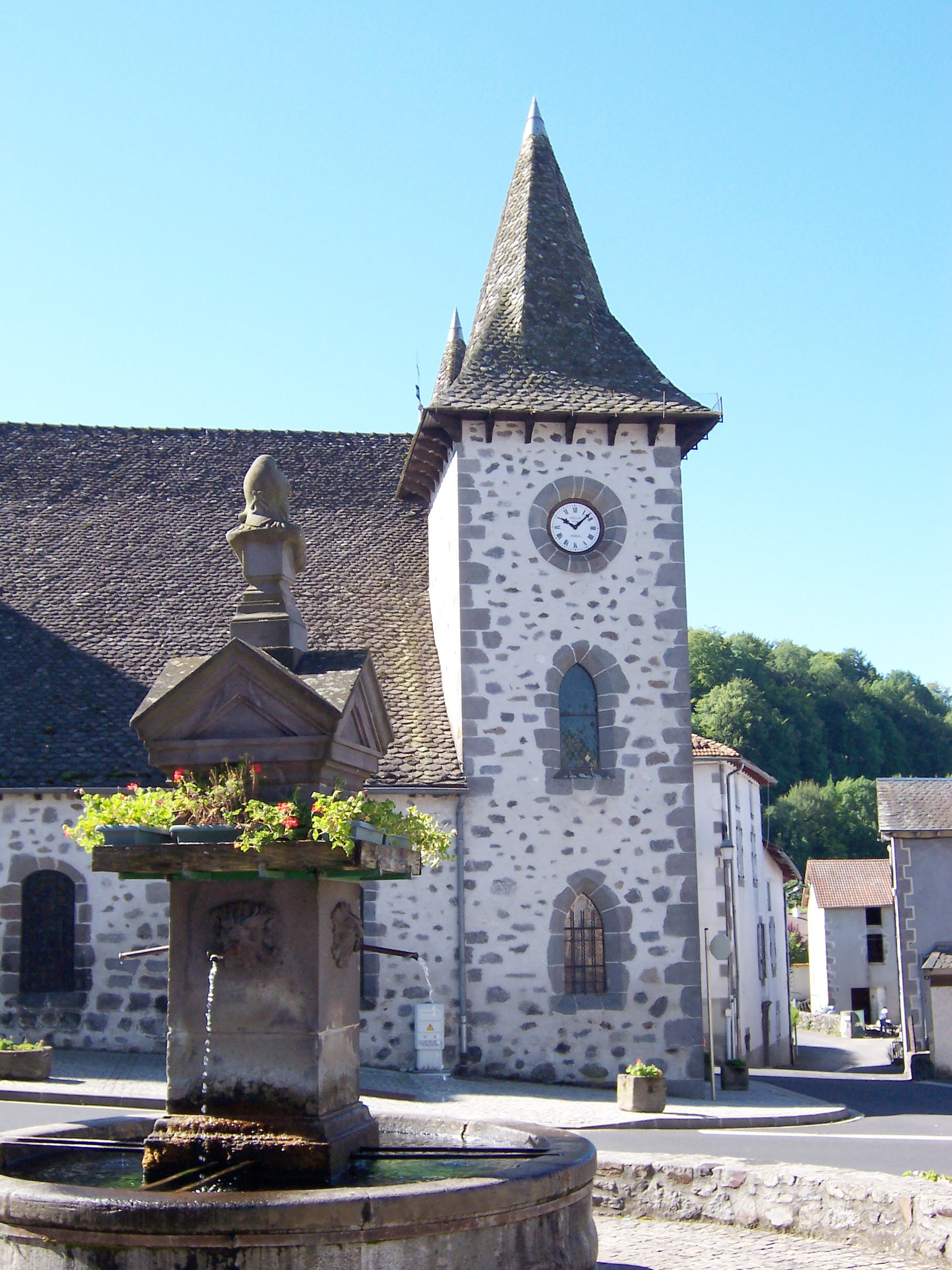
- The church and fountain in Jussac
- Location of Jussac
- Location within France Location within Auvergne-Rhône-Alpes
- Coordinates: 44°59′19″N 2°25′26″E
- Country: France
- Region: Auvergne-Rhône-Alpes
- Department: Cantal
- Arrondissement: Aurillac
- Canton: Naucelles
- Intercommunality: CA Aurillac Agglomération

Government
  - Mayor (2020–2026): Jean-François Rodier
- Area^{1}: 18.43 km^{2} (7.12 sq mi)
- Elevation: 630 m (2,070 ft)
- Highest elevation: 874 m (2,867 ft)
- Lowest elevation: 609 m (1,998 ft)
- Population (2023): 2,040
  - Density: 111/km^{2} (287/sq mi)
- Time zone: UTC+01:00 (CET)
  - Summer (DST): UTC+02:00 (CEST)
- INSEE/Postal code: 15083 /15250
- ^{1} French Land Register data, which excludes lakes, ponds, glaciers > 1 km^{2} (0.386 sq mi or 247 acres) and river estuaries.

Jussac (French pronunciation: [ʒysak]; Occitan: Jussac) is a commune in the Cantal department in south-central France.

== Population ==
Historical population
Year	Pop.	±% p.a.
1968	1,204	—
1975	1,685	+4.92%
1982	1,825	+1.15%
1990	1,865	+0.27%
1999	1,779	−0.52%
2007	1,820	+0.29%
2012	1,941	+1.30%
2017	2,019	+0.79%
2023	2,040	+0.17%
Source: INSEE

== See also ==
- Communes of the Cantal department
