= Saint-Chamant, Cantal =

Commune in Auvergne-Rhône-Alpes, France

Saint-Chamant
- Commune
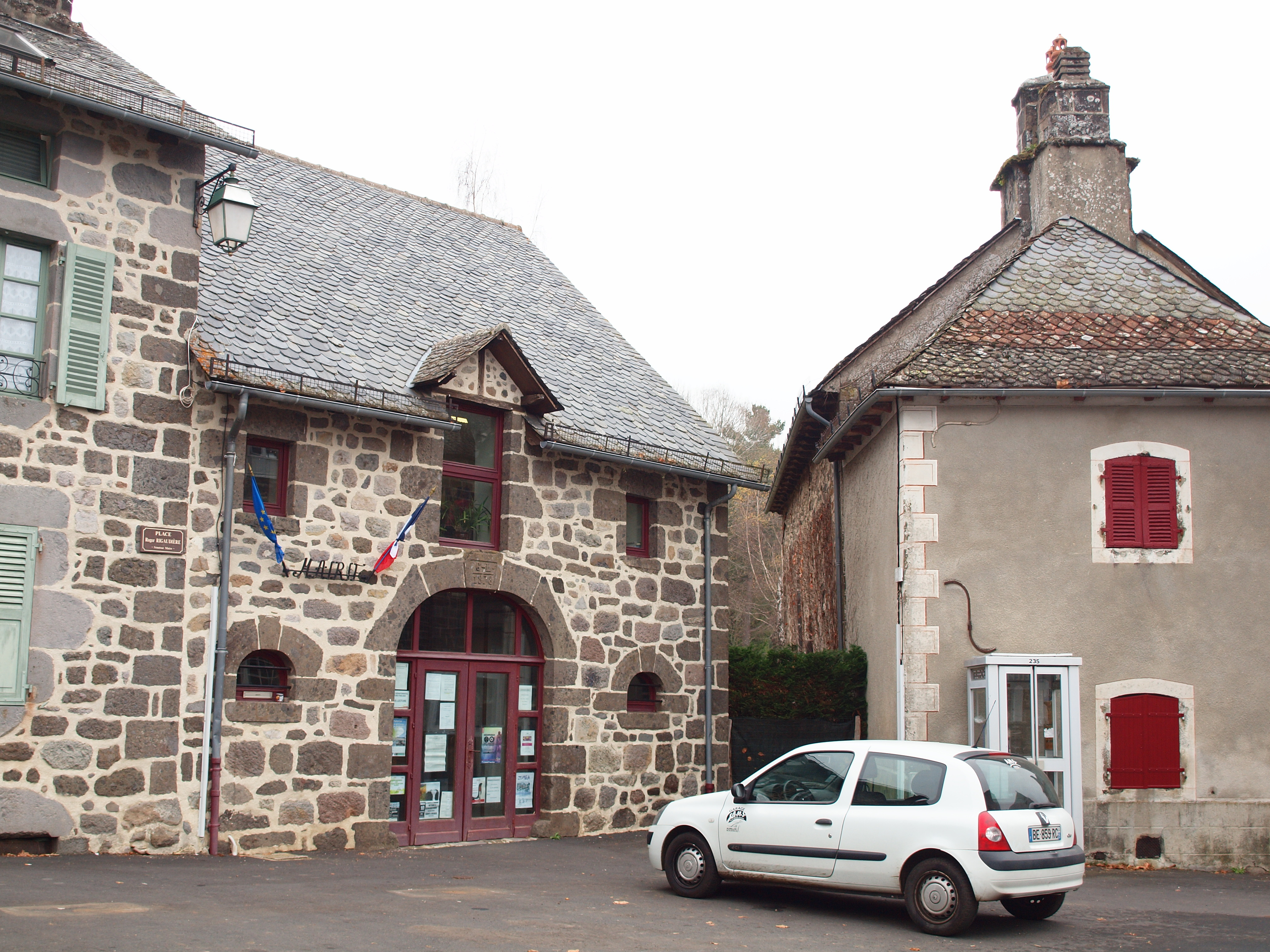
- Town hall
- Location of Saint-Chamant
- Location within France Location within Auvergne-Rhône-Alpes
- Coordinates: 45°05′30″N 2°26′24″E
- Country: France
- Region: Auvergne-Rhône-Alpes
- Department: Cantal
- Arrondissement: Mauriac
- Canton: Naucelles
- Intercommunality: Pays de Salers

Government
  - Mayor (2020–2026): Jean-Marie Fabre
- Area^{1}: 13.72 km^{2} (5.30 sq mi)
- Elevation: 752 m (2,467 ft)
- Highest elevation: 940 m (3,080 ft)
- Lowest elevation: 635 m (2,083 ft)
- Population (2023): 237
  - Density: 17.3/km^{2} (44.7/sq mi)
- Time zone: UTC+01:00 (CET)
  - Summer (DST): UTC+02:00 (CEST)
- INSEE/Postal code: 15176 /15140
- ^{1} French Land Register data, which excludes lakes, ponds, glaciers > 1 km^{2} (0.386 sq mi or 247 acres) and river estuaries.

Saint-Chamant (French pronunciation: [sɛ̃ ʃamɑ̃]; Auvergnat: Sanch Amanç) is a commune in the Cantal department in south-central France.

== Population ==
Historical population
Year	Pop.	±% p.a.
1968	491	—
1975	410	−2.54%
1982	332	−2.97%
1990	329	−0.11%
1999	280	−1.78%
2007	261	−0.87%
2012	241	−1.58%
2017	239	−0.17%
2023	237	−0.14%
Source: INSEE

== See also ==
- Communes of the Cantal department
