= Reilhac, Cantal =

Commune in Auvergne-Rhône-Alpes, France

Reilhac
- Commune
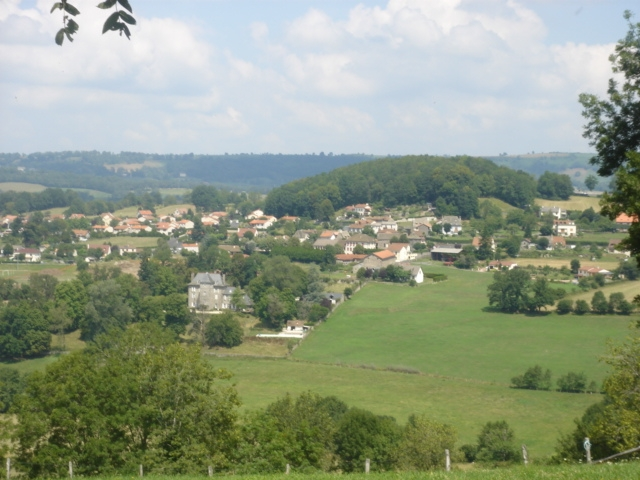
- A general view of Reilhac
- Location of Reilhac
- Location within France Location within Auvergne-Rhône-Alpes
- Coordinates: 44°58′28″N 2°25′19″E
- Country: France
- Region: Auvergne-Rhône-Alpes
- Department: Cantal
- Arrondissement: Aurillac
- Canton: Naucelles
- Intercommunality: CA Aurillac Agglomération

Government
  - Mayor (2020–2026): Jean-Pierre Picard
- Area^{1}: 8.89 km^{2} (3.43 sq mi)
- Elevation: 636 m (2,087 ft)
- Highest elevation: 867 m (2,844 ft)
- Lowest elevation: 582 m (1,909 ft)
- Population (2023): 1,090
  - Density: 123/km^{2} (318/sq mi)
- Time zone: UTC+01:00 (CET)
  - Summer (DST): UTC+02:00 (CEST)
- INSEE/Postal code: 15160 /15250
- ^{1} French Land Register data, which excludes lakes, ponds, glaciers > 1 km^{2} (0.386 sq mi or 247 acres) and river estuaries.

Reilhac (French pronunciation: [ʁɛjak]; Occitan: Relhac) is a commune in the Cantal department in south-central France.

== Population ==
Historical population
Year	Pop.	±% p.a.
1968	487	—
1975	814	+7.61%
1982	768	−0.83%
1990	901	+2.02%
1999	957	+0.67%
2007	987	+0.39%
2012	1,097	+2.14%
2017	1,105	+0.15%
2023	1,090	−0.23%
Source: INSEE

== Administration ==
=== List of mayors from the French Revolution to the Liberation (1790-1944) ===
Time in Office		Name	Occupation
1802	1804	Jean-Baptiste Mountain	
1804	1808	Jean Bastide	
1808	1825	Pierre Grifeilles	
1825	1827	Jean Prax	judge
1827	1840	François Besse	officer
1840	1844	Pierre Royre	
1844	1848	Jean Larroumes	
1848	1878	Jean-Louis Prax	Commander of the Legion of Honor
1878	1881	Pierre Magis	
1881	1881	Charles Prax	officer
1881	1884	Pierre Bruel	
1884	1925	Gérard Chandon	
1925	1929	Jean Bouyssou	
1929	1935	Francis Delsol	
1935	1941	Antoine-Émile Larroumets	tax collector
1941	1944	Pierre Fournier	trader in Aurillac

==== List of mayors since the Liberation (1944-Today) ====
Time in office		Name	Occupation
1944	1947	Henri Maury	
1947	1965	Jean Richard	
1965	1969	Pierre Serpeau	
1968	1971	Pierre Mas	
1971	1977	André Martinet	trader in Aurillac
1977	1989	Marie-Louise Serpeau	accounting
1989	incumbent	Jean-Pierre Picard	Retired Public Service

== See also ==
- Communes of the Cantal department
