= Saint-Cirgues-de-Malbert =

Commune in Auvergne-Rhône-Alpes, France

- Commune
- Location of Saint-Cirgues-de-Malbert
- Location within France Location within Auvergne-Rhône-Alpes
- Coordinates: 45°05′57″N 2°23′39″E
- Country: France
- Region: Auvergne-Rhône-Alpes
- Department: Cantal
- Arrondissement: Aurillac
- Canton: Naucelles
- Intercommunality: Pays de Salers

Government
  - Mayor (2020–2026): Marc Benech
- Area^{1}: 16.21 km^{2} (6.26 sq mi)
- Elevation: 700 m (2,300 ft)
- Highest elevation: 833 m (2,733 ft)
- Lowest elevation: 502 m (1,647 ft)
- Population (2023): 248
  - Density: 15.3/km^{2} (39.6/sq mi)
- Time zone: UTC+01:00 (CET)
  - Summer (DST): UTC+02:00 (CEST)
- INSEE/Postal code: 15179 /15140
- ^{1} French Land Register data, which excludes lakes, ponds, glaciers > 1 km^{2} (0.386 sq mi or 247 acres) and river estuaries.

Saint-Cirgues-de-Malbert (French pronunciation: [sɛ̃ siʁɡ də malbɛʁ]; Occitan: Sant Cirgue de Malbèrt) is a commune in the Cantal department in south-central France.

== Population ==
Historical population
Year	Pop.	±% p.a.
1968	335	—
1975	302	−1.47%
1982	238	−3.35%
1990	232	−0.32%
1999	226	−0.29%
2007	215	−0.62%
2012	236	+1.88%
2017	249	+1.08%
2023	248	−0.07%
Source: INSEE

== See also ==
- Communes of the Cantal department
