= Vézac, Dordogne =

Vézac
- Commune
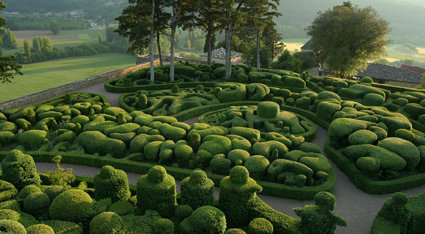
- The Marqueyssac chateau gardens
- Location of Vézac
- Location within France Location within Nouvelle-Aquitaine
- Coordinates: 44°50′07″N 1°09′55″E
- Country: France
- Region: Nouvelle-Aquitaine
- Department: Dordogne
- Arrondissement: Sarlat-la-Canéda
- Canton: Sarlat-la-Canéda
- Intercommunality: Sarlat-Périgord Noir

Government
  - Mayor (2020–2026): Christian Robles
- Area^{1}: 12.97 km^{2} (5.01 sq mi)
- Elevation: 92 m (302 ft)
- Highest elevation: 243 m (797 ft)
- Lowest elevation: 49 m (161 ft)
- Population (2023): 533
  - Density: 41.1/km^{2} (106/sq mi)
- Time zone: UTC+01:00 (CET)
  - Summer (DST): UTC+02:00 (CEST)
- INSEE/Postal code: 24577 /24220
- ^{1} French Land Register data, which excludes lakes, ponds, glaciers > 1 km^{2} (0.386 sq mi or 247 acres) and river estuaries.

Vézac (French pronunciation: [vezak]; Occitan: Vesac) is a commune in the Dordogne department in Nouvelle-Aquitaine in southwestern France.

The main attraction of Vézac is the garden surrounding the Château de Marqueyssac —classified as a remarkable garden by the French Ministry of Culture—which was built in the 17th century by Bertrand Vernet, counsellor to the king. The original garden was created by a pupil of André Le Nôtre, and featured gardens, terraces, and a kitchen garden surrounding the chateau. A grand promenade one hundred metres long was added at the end of the 18th century. Beginning in 1866, the new owner, Julien de Cerval, who was inspired by Italian gardens, built rustic structures, redesigned the parterres, laid out five kilometres of walks, and planted pines and cypress trees.

== Population ==
Historical population
| Year | Pop. | ±% p.a. |
|---|---|---|
| 1968 | 356 | — |
| 1975 | 427 | +2.63% |
| 1982 | 547 | +3.60% |
| 1990 | 620 | +1.58% |
| 1999 | 594 | −0.47% |
| 2007 | 607 | +0.27% |
| 2012 | 619 | +0.39% |
| 2017 | 587 | −1.06% |
| 2023 | 533 | −1.60% |
Source: INSEE

== See also ==
- Communes of the Dordogne department
