= Vézac, Cantal =

Commune in Auvergne-Rhône-Alpes, France

Vézac
- Commune
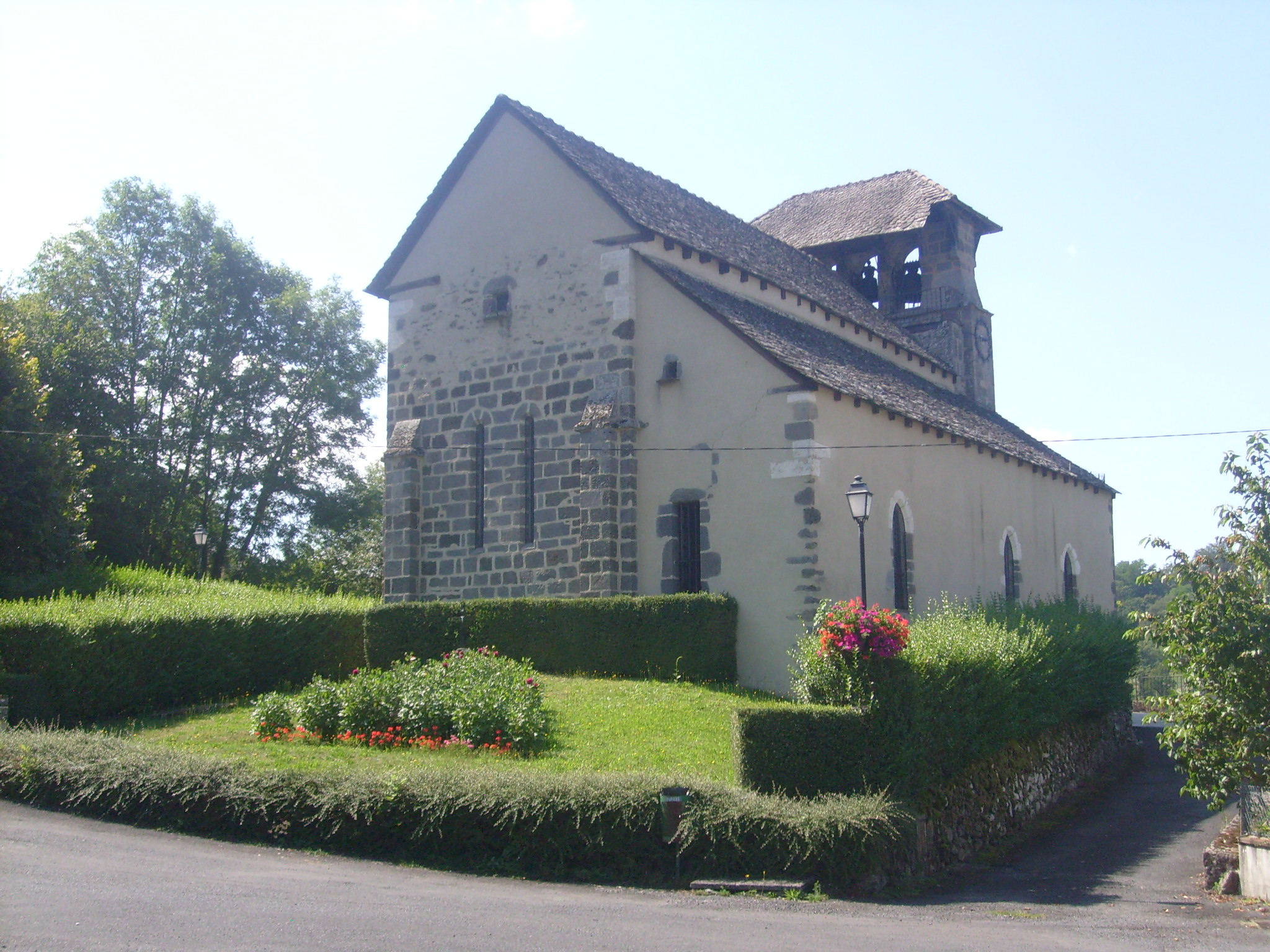
- The church of Saint-Roch, in Vézac
- Location of Vézac
- Location within France Location within Auvergne-Rhône-Alpes
- Coordinates: 44°53′39″N 2°31′13″E
- Country: France
- Region: Auvergne-Rhône-Alpes
- Department: Cantal
- Arrondissement: Aurillac
- Canton: Vic-sur-Cère
- Intercommunality: CA Aurillac Agglomération

Government
  - Mayor (2020–2026): Jean-Luc Lentier
- Area^{1}: 15.02 km^{2} (5.80 sq mi)
- Elevation: 650 m (2,130 ft)
- Highest elevation: 860 m (2,820 ft)
- Lowest elevation: 617 m (2,024 ft)
- Population (2023): 1,325
  - Density: 88.22/km^{2} (228.5/sq mi)
- Time zone: UTC+01:00 (CET)
  - Summer (DST): UTC+02:00 (CEST)
- INSEE/Postal code: 15255 /15130
- ^{1} French Land Register data, which excludes lakes, ponds, glaciers > 1 km^{2} (0.386 sq mi or 247 acres) and river estuaries.

Vézac (French pronunciation: [vezak]; Occitan: Vesac) is a commune in the Cantal department in south-central France.

== Population ==
Historical population
Year	Pop.	±% p.a.
1968	637	—
1975	743	+2.22%
1982	861	+2.13%
1990	955	+1.30%
1999	952	−0.03%
2007	1,103	+1.86%
2012	1,196	+1.63%
2017	1,205	+0.15%
2023	1,325	+1.59%
Source: INSEE

== See also ==
- Communes of the Cantal department
