= Jean Mézard =

French Politician

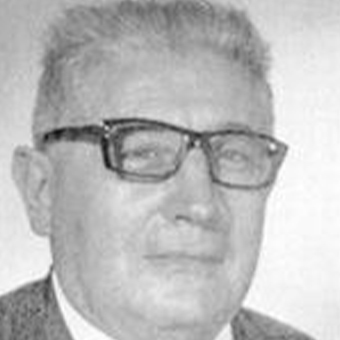

Mayor of Aurillac
- In office 1971–1977
- Preceded by: Jacques Meyniel
- Succeeded by: René Souchon

Personal details
- Born: 17 June 1904 Vayrac, France
- Died: 4 March 1997 (aged 92) Aurillac, France
- Children: Jacques Mézard

Jean Mézard (1904-1997) was a French physician and politician. He served as a member of the French Senate from 1971 to 1980, representing Cantal.
