= Jacques Mézard =

French lawyer and politician (born 1947)

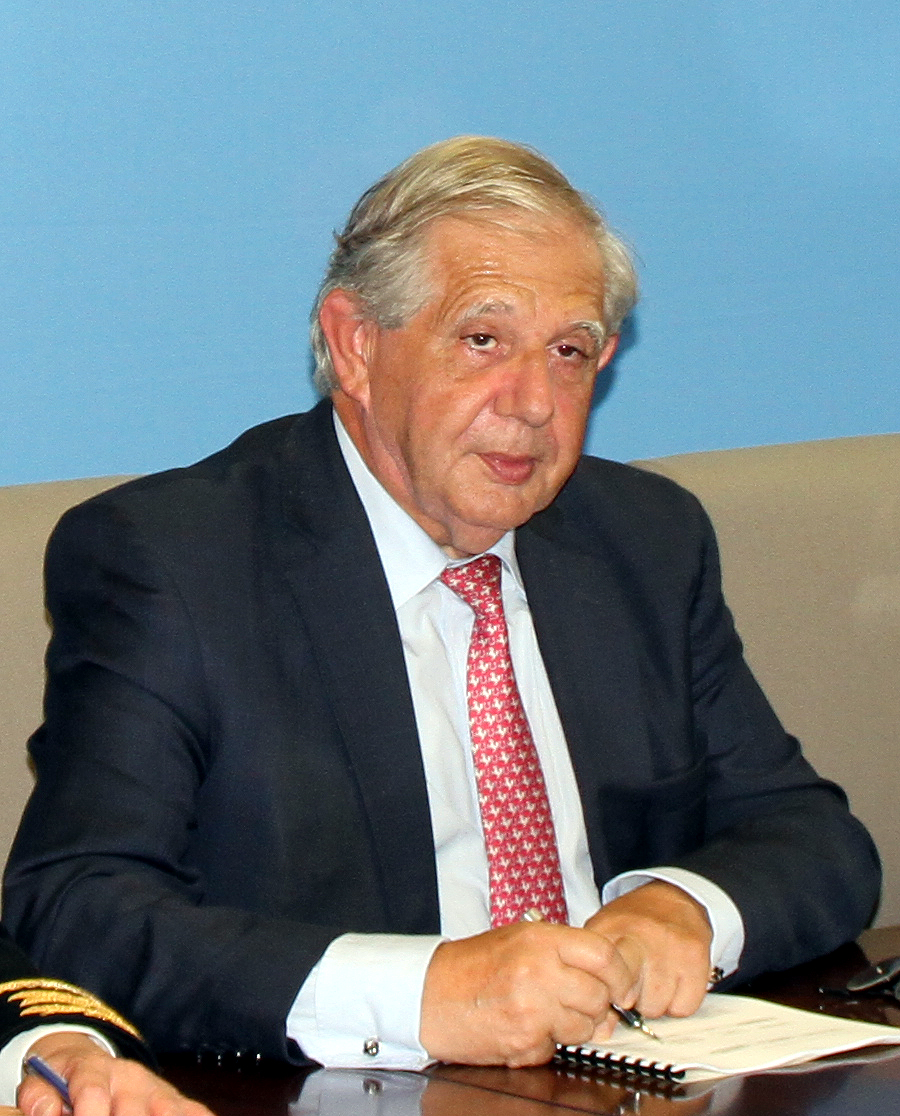

Member of the Constitutional Council
- Incumbent
- Assumed office 11 March 2019
- Appointed by: Emmanuel Macron
- President: Laurent Fabius; Richard Ferrand
- Preceded by: Michel Charasse

Minister of Territorial Cohesion
- In office 21 June 2017 – 16 October 2018
- Prime Minister: Édouard Philippe
- Preceded by: Richard Ferrand
- Succeeded by: Jacqueline Gourault

Minister of Agriculture and Food
- In office 17 May 2017 – 19 June 2017
- Prime Minister: Édouard Philippe
- Preceded by: Stéphane Le Foll
- Succeeded by: Stéphane Travert

President of the European Democratic and Social Rally group in the Senate
- In office 4 October 2011 – 22 May 2017
- Preceded by: Yvon Collin
- Succeeded by: Gilbert Barbier

Senator for Cantal
- In office 17 November 2018 – 3 March 2019
- In office 1 October 2008 – 17 June 2017

Personal details
- Born: Jacques Martin Mézard; 3 December 1947 (age 78) Aurillac, France
- Party: Radical Party of the Left
- Parent: Jean Mézard
- Education: Panthéon-Assas University
- Profession: Lawyer

Jacques Martin Mézard (French pronunciation: [ʒak mezaʁ]; born 3 December 1947) is a French lawyer and politician who has served as a member of the Constitutional Council since 2019. A member of the Radical Party of the Left (PRG), he previously served as Minister of Agriculture and Food in 2017 and Minister of Territorial Cohesion from 2017 to 2018 under Prime Minister Édouard Philippe. He was a Senator for the Cantal department from 2008 to 2017 and again from 2018 until 2019, presiding over the European Democratic and Social Rally group from 2011 to 2017.

== Early life ==
Mézard was born in Aurillac. He graduated from Panthéon-Assas University in Paris, where he received a law degree.

== Career ==
From 1971 to 1976, he worked as a lawyer in Paris and taught law at Panthéon-Sorbonne University. Additionally, he served as vice president of Panthéon-Sorbonne University from 1970 to 1975. From 1977 to 2009, he worked as a lawyer in Aurillac.

He served as Deputy Mayor of Aurillac from 1982 to 1993. He also served as a member of the General Council of Cantal from 1994 to 2008. After the 2008 Senate election, he was installed as a Senator for Cantal. He was reelected in 2014. In 2011, he was chosen as President of the European Democratic and Social Rally group.

On 17 May 2017, Mézard was appointed Minister of Agriculture and Food in the First Philippe government. On 21 June 2017, he was appointed Minister of Territorial Cohesion in the Second Philippe Government, replacing Richard Ferrand. He left his position on 16 October 2018 to return to the Senate. On 11 March 2019, he was sworn in as a member of the Constitutional Council, following his appointment by President Emmanuel Macron.

== Honours ==
- Knight of the Legion of Honour (2025)
- Knight of the Ordre national du Mérite (1997)

Political offices
Preceded by Stéphane Le Foll	Minister of Agriculture and Food; 2017	Succeeded by Stéphane Travert
Preceded by Richard Ferrand	Minister of Territorial Cohesion; 2017–2018	Succeeded by Jacqueline Gourault
Legal offices
Preceded by Michel Charasse	Member of the Constitutional Council; 2019–present	Incumbent
