= Vabres =

Vabres is the name or part of the name of several communes in France:

- Vabres, Cantal
- Vabres, Gard
- Vabres, former commune of the Haute-Loire department, now part of Alleyras
- Vabres-l'Abbaye, in the Aveyron department
- Vabre, in the Tarn department
- Vabre-Tizac, in the Aveyron department

Vabres may also refer to:

- Ancient Diocese of Vabres
