= Saint Martial (disambiguation) =

Saint Martial is a 3rd century Catholic and Orthodox saint and the first bishop of Limoges.

Saint Martial or Saint-Martial may also refer to:

== Communes in France ==
- Saint-Martial, Ardèche, in the Ardèche département
- Saint-Martial, Cantal, in the Cantal département
- Saint-Martial, Charente, in the Charente département
- Saint-Martial, Charente-Maritime, in the Charente-Maritime département
- Saint-Martial, Gard, in the Gard département
- Saint-Martial, Gironde, in the Gironde département

== People ==
- Saint Martial, the son of Felicitas, venerated in Italy
- Martial of Rome, secretary of the apostle Peter, mentioned at Santa Maria in Via Lata

== Other uses ==
- Abbey of Saint Martial, Limoges
- Petit Séminaire Collège Saint-Martial, a high school in Port-au-Prince, Haiti
- St. Martial school, a style of Aquitanian polyphony in medieval music

== See also ==
- Other communes in France:
  - Saint-Martial-de-Mirambeau, in the Charente-Maritime département
  - Saint-Martial-de-Vitaterne, in the Charente-Maritime département
  - Saint-Martial-sur-Né, in the Charente-Maritime département
  - Saint-Martial-de-Gimel, in the Corrèze département
  - Saint-Martial-Entraygues, in the Corrèze département
  - Saint-Martial-le-Mont, in the Creuse département
  - Saint-Martial-le-Vieux, in the Creuse département
  - Saint-Martial-d'Albarède, in the Dordogne département
  - Saint-Martial-d'Artenset, in the Dordogne département
  - Saint-Martial-de-Nabirat, in the Dordogne département
  - Saint-Martial-de-Valette, in the Dordogne département
  - Saint-Martial-Viveyrol, in the Dordogne département
  - Saint-Martial-sur-Isop, in the Haute-Vienne département
