= Soulages =

Soulages may refer to:

- Pierre Soulages (1919–2022), French painter, engraver and sculptor
- Soulages, Cantal, a commune in the Cantal department in France
- Soulages-Bonneval, a commune in the Aveyron department in France

== See also ==
- Soulage
