= Canton of Neuvéglise-sur-Truyère =

Coordinates: 44.93°N 2.98°E

- Canton
- Situation of the canton of Neuvéglise-sur-Truyère in the department of Cantal
- Country: France
- Region: Auvergne-Rhône-Alpes
- Department: Cantal
- No. of communes: {{{nbcomm}}}
- Population (2023): 8,554
- INSEE code: 1509

The canton of Neuvéglise-sur-Truyère (before November 2019: canton of Neuvéglise) is an administrative division of the Cantal department, southern France. It was created at the French canton reorganisation which came into effect in March 2015. Its seat is in Neuvéglise-sur-Truyère.

It consists of the following communes:

1. Alleuze
2. Anglards-de-Saint-Flour
3. Anterrieux
4. Celoux
5. Chaliers
6. Chaudes-Aigues
7. Chazelles
8. Clavières
9. Deux-Verges
10. Espinasse
11. Fridefont
12. Jabrun
13. Lieutadès
14. Lorcières
15. Maurines
16. Neuvéglise-sur-Truyère
17. Rageade
18. Ruynes-en-Margeride
19. Saint-Georges
20. Saint-Martial
21. Saint-Rémy-de-Chaudes-Aigues
22. Saint-Urcize
23. Soulages
24. La Trinitat
25. Vabres
26. Val-d'Arcomie
27. Védrines-Saint-Loup
