= Anglards-de-Saint-Flour =

Commune in Auvergne-Rhône-Alpes, France

- Commune
- Location of Anglards-de-Saint-Flour
- Location within France Location within Auvergne-Rhône-Alpes
- Coordinates: 44°58′55″N 3°09′16″E
- Country: France
- Region: Auvergne-Rhône-Alpes
- Department: Cantal
- Arrondissement: Saint-Flour
- Canton: Neuvéglise-sur-Truyère
- Intercommunality: Saint-Flour Communauté

Government
  - Mayor (2020–2026): Roland Brunel
- Area^{1}: 12.28 km^{2} (4.74 sq mi)
- Elevation: 840 m (2,760 ft)
- Highest elevation: 884 m (2,900 ft)
- Lowest elevation: 732 m (2,402 ft)
- Population (2023): 412
  - Density: 33.6/km^{2} (86.9/sq mi)
- Time zone: UTC+01:00 (CET)
  - Summer (DST): UTC+02:00 (CEST)
- INSEE/Postal code: 15005 /15100
- ^{1} French Land Register data, which excludes lakes, ponds, glaciers > 1 km^{2} (0.386 sq mi or 247 acres) and river estuaries.

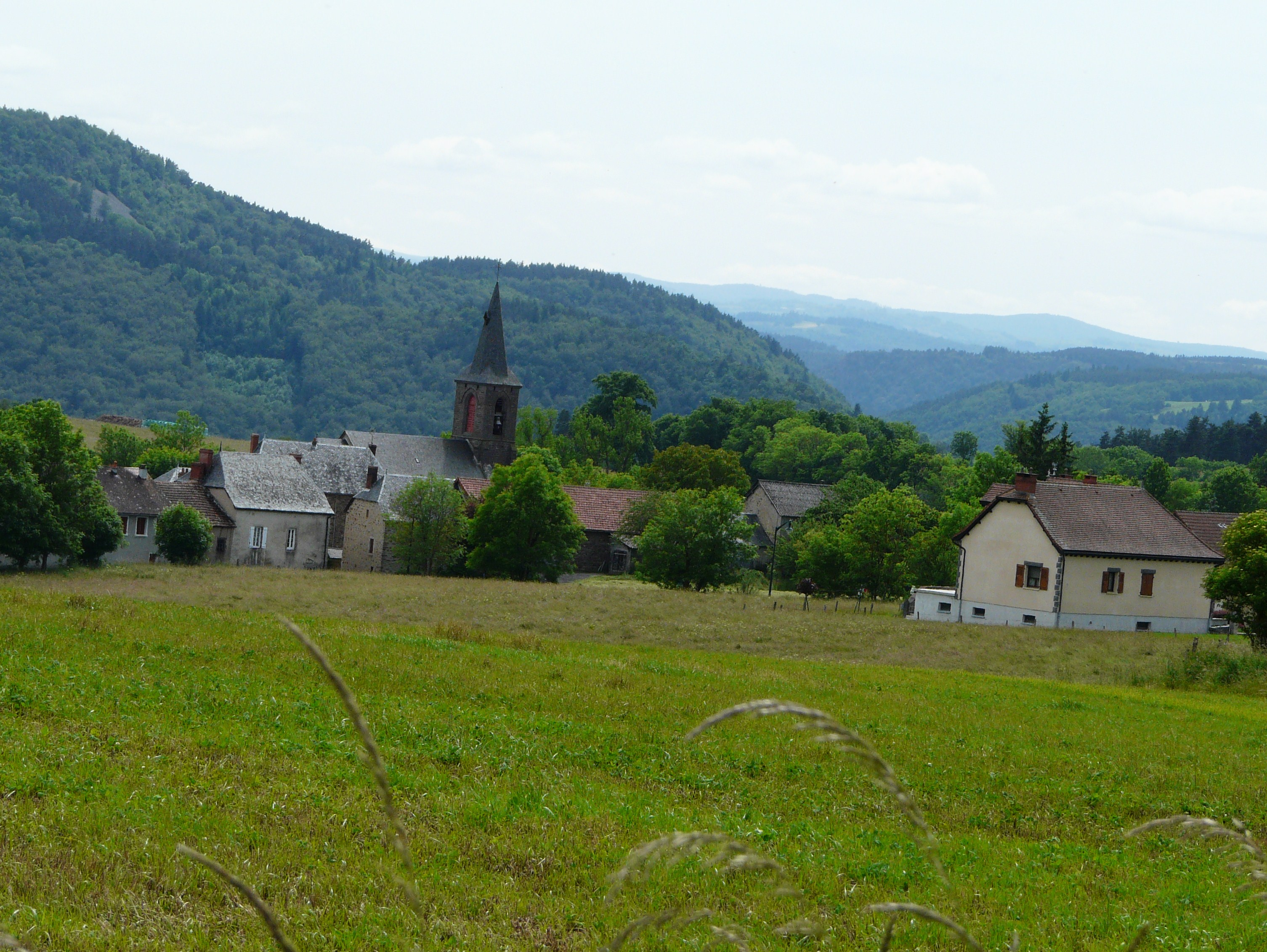
Anglards-de-Saint-Flour bourg

Anglards-de-Saint-Flour (French pronunciation: [ɑ̃ɡlaʁ də sɛ̃ fluʁ]; Auvergnat: Anglars de Sant Flor) is a commune in the Cantal department in the Auvergne region in south-central France.

== Population ==
Historical population
Year	Pop.	±% p.a.
1968	227	—
1975	217	−0.64%
1982	225	+0.52%
1990	276	+2.59%
1999	283	+0.28%
2007	318	+1.47%
2012	347	+1.76%
2017	349	+0.12%
2023	412	+2.80%
Source: INSEE

== See also ==
- Communes of the Cantal department
