= Rageade =

Commune in Auvergne-Rhône-Alpes, France

- Commune
- Location of Rageade
- Location within France Location within Auvergne-Rhône-Alpes
- Coordinates: 45°06′19″N 3°16′40″E
- Country: France
- Region: Auvergne-Rhône-Alpes
- Department: Cantal
- Arrondissement: Saint-Flour
- Canton: Neuvéglise-sur-Truyère

Government
  - Mayor (2020–2026): Bernadette Beaufort
- Area^{1}: 12.59 km^{2} (4.86 sq mi)
- Elevation: 920 m (3,020 ft)
- Highest elevation: 1,125 m (3,691 ft)
- Lowest elevation: 920 m (3,020 ft)
- Population (2023): 95
  - Density: 7.5/km^{2} (20/sq mi)
- Time zone: UTC+01:00 (CET)
  - Summer (DST): UTC+02:00 (CEST)
- INSEE/Postal code: 15158 /15500
- ^{1} French Land Register data, which excludes lakes, ponds, glaciers > 1 km^{2} (0.386 sq mi or 247 acres) and river estuaries.

Rageade (French pronunciation: [ʁaʒad]; Occitan: Rajada) is a commune in the Cantal department in south-central France.

== Population ==
Historical population
Year	Pop.	±% p.a.
1968	200	—
1975	186	−1.03%
1982	158	−2.30%
1990	155	−0.24%
1999	135	−1.52%
2007	115	−1.98%
2012	102	−2.37%
2017	100	−0.40%
2023	95	−0.85%
Source: INSEE

== See also ==
- Communes of the Cantal department
