= Celoux =

Commune in Auvergne-Rhône-Alpes, France

- Commune
- Location of Celoux
- Location within France Location within Auvergne-Rhône-Alpes
- Coordinates: 45°08′45″N 3°15′54″E
- Country: France
- Region: Auvergne-Rhône-Alpes
- Department: Cantal
- Arrondissement: Saint-Flour
- Canton: Neuvéglise-sur-Truyère
- Intercommunality: Hautes Terres

Government
  - Mayor (2020–2026): Frédérique Buchon
- Area^{1}: 9.62 km^{2} (3.71 sq mi)
- Elevation: 900 m (3,000 ft)
- Highest elevation: 1,122 m (3,681 ft)
- Lowest elevation: 919 m (3,015 ft)
- Population (2023): 59
  - Density: 6.1/km^{2} (16/sq mi)
- Time zone: UTC+01:00 (CET)
  - Summer (DST): UTC+02:00 (CEST)
- INSEE/Postal code: 15032 /15500
- ^{1} French Land Register data, which excludes lakes, ponds, glaciers > 1 km^{2} (0.386 sq mi or 247 acres) and river estuaries.

Celoux (French pronunciation: [səlu]; Occitan: Celós) is a commune in the Cantal department in south-central France.

== Population ==
Historical population
Year	Pop.	±% p.a.
1968	153	—
1975	136	−1.67%
1982	110	−2.99%
1990	103	−0.82%
1999	89	−1.61%
2007	81	−1.17%
2012	71	−2.60%
2017	64	−2.05%
2023	59	−1.35%
Source: INSEE

== See also ==
- Communes of the Cantal department
