= Lieutadès =

Commune in Auvergne-Rhône-Alpes, France

- Commune
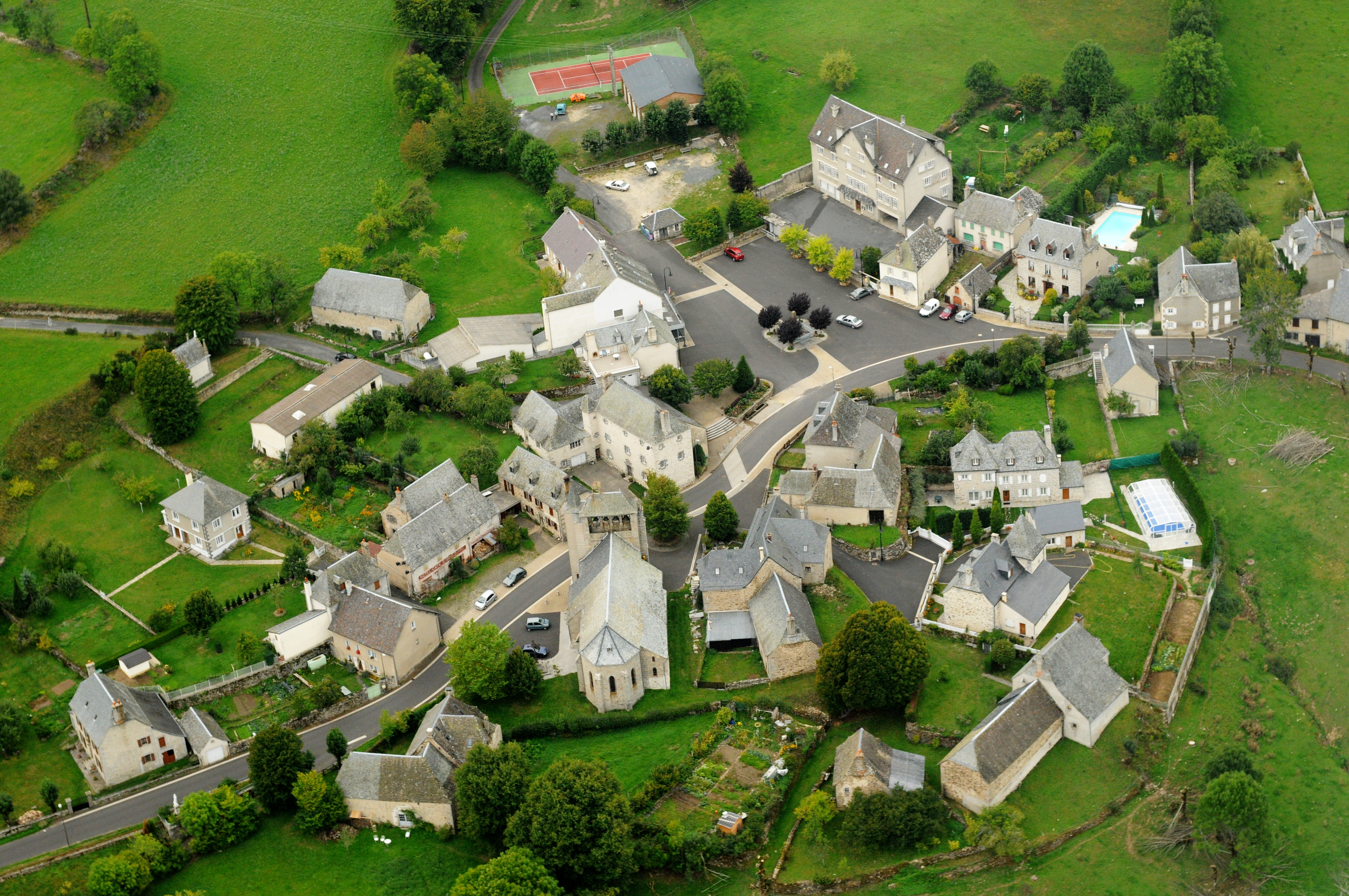
- An aerial view of Lieutadès
- Location of Lieutadès
- Location within France Location within Auvergne-Rhône-Alpes
- Coordinates: 44°50′27″N 2°53′59″E
- Country: France
- Region: Auvergne-Rhône-Alpes
- Department: Cantal
- Arrondissement: Saint-Flour
- Canton: Neuvéglise-sur-Truyère

Government
  - Mayor (2020–2026): Robert Boudon
- Area^{1}: 39.91 km^{2} (15.41 sq mi)
- Elevation: 930 m (3,050 ft)
- Highest elevation: 1,136 m (3,727 ft)
- Lowest elevation: 621 m (2,037 ft)
- Population (2023): 169
  - Density: 4.23/km^{2} (11.0/sq mi)
- Time zone: UTC+01:00 (CET)
  - Summer (DST): UTC+02:00 (CEST)
- INSEE/Postal code: 15106 /15110
- ^{1} French Land Register data, which excludes lakes, ponds, glaciers > 1 km^{2} (0.386 sq mi or 247 acres) and river estuaries.

Lieutadès (French pronunciation: [ljøtadɛs]; Occitan: Lhautadés) is a commune in the Cantal department in south-central France.

== Population ==
Historical population
Year	Pop.	±% p.a.
1968	363	—
1975	288	−3.25%
1982	287	−0.05%
1990	252	−1.61%
1999	225	−1.25%
2007	216	−0.51%
2012	185	−3.05%
2017	162	−2.62%
2023	169	+0.71%
Source: INSEE

== See also ==
- Communes of the Cantal department
