= Gourdièges =

Commune in Auvergne-Rhône-Alpes, France

- Commune
- Location of Gourdièges
- Location within France Location within Auvergne-Rhône-Alpes
- Coordinates: 44°56′16″N 2°52′53″E
- Country: France
- Region: Auvergne-Rhône-Alpes
- Department: Cantal
- Arrondissement: Saint-Flour
- Canton: Saint-Flour-2

Government
  - Mayor (2020–2026): Bernard Coudy
- Area^{1}: 8.46 km^{2} (3.27 sq mi)
- Elevation: 1,100 m (3,600 ft)
- Highest elevation: 1,157 m (3,796 ft)
- Lowest elevation: 987 m (3,238 ft)
- Population (2023): 70
  - Density: 8.3/km^{2} (21/sq mi)
- Time zone: UTC+01:00 (CET)
  - Summer (DST): UTC+02:00 (CEST)
- INSEE/Postal code: 15077 /15230
- ^{1} French Land Register data, which excludes lakes, ponds, glaciers > 1 km^{2} (0.386 sq mi or 247 acres) and river estuaries.

Gourdièges (French pronunciation: [ɡuʁdjɛʒ]; Occitan: Gordieja) is a commune in the Cantal department in south-central France.

== Population ==
Historical population
Year	Pop.	±% p.a.
1968	105	—
1975	103	−0.27%
1982	79	−3.72%
1990	61	−3.18%
1999	54	−1.35%
2007	64	+2.15%
2012	58	−1.95%
2017	60	+0.68%
2023	70	+2.60%
Source: INSEE

== See also ==
- Communes of the Cantal department
