= Mentières =

Commune in Auvergne-Rhône-Alpes, France

- Commune
- Location of Mentières
- Location within France Location within Auvergne-Rhône-Alpes
- Coordinates: 45°04′14″N 3°08′20″E
- Country: France
- Region: Auvergne-Rhône-Alpes
- Department: Cantal
- Arrondissement: Saint-Flour
- Canton: Saint-Flour-1
- Intercommunality: Saint-Flour

Government
  - Mayor (2020–2026): Marina Besse
- Area^{1}: 13.17 km^{2} (5.08 sq mi)
- Elevation: 850 m (2,790 ft)
- Highest elevation: 1,128 m (3,701 ft)
- Lowest elevation: 834 m (2,736 ft)
- Population (2023): 121
  - Density: 9.19/km^{2} (23.8/sq mi)
- Time zone: UTC+01:00 (CET)
  - Summer (DST): UTC+02:00 (CEST)
- INSEE/Postal code: 15125 /15100
- ^{1} French Land Register data, which excludes lakes, ponds, glaciers > 1 km^{2} (0.386 sq mi or 247 acres) and river estuaries.

Mentières (French pronunciation: [mɑ̃tjɛʁ]; Occitan: Mentèira) is a commune in the Cantal department in south-central France.

== Population ==
Historical population
Year	Pop.	±% p.a.
1968	176	—
1975	143	−2.92%
1982	136	−0.71%
1990	120	−1.55%
1999	112	−0.76%
2007	130	+1.88%
2012	123	−1.10%
2017	127	+0.64%
2023	121	−0.80%
Source: INSEE

== See also ==
- Communes of the Cantal department
