= Deux-Verges =

Commune in Auvergne-Rhône-Alpes, France

- Commune
- Location of Deux-Verges
- Location within France Location within Auvergne-Rhône-Alpes
- Coordinates: 44°48′27″N 3°01′28″E
- Country: France
- Region: Auvergne-Rhône-Alpes
- Department: Cantal
- Arrondissement: Saint-Flour
- Canton: Neuvéglise-sur-Truyère
- Intercommunality: Saint-Flour Communauté

Government
  - Mayor (2020–2026): Pascal Poudevigne
- Area^{1}: 11.2 km^{2} (4.3 sq mi)
- Elevation: 1,020 m (3,350 ft)
- Highest elevation: 1,286 m (4,219 ft)
- Lowest elevation: 959 m (3,146 ft)
- Population (2023): 55
  - Density: 4.9/km^{2} (13/sq mi)
- Time zone: UTC+01:00 (CET)
  - Summer (DST): UTC+02:00 (CEST)
- INSEE/Postal code: 15060 /15110
- ^{1} French Land Register data, which excludes lakes, ponds, glaciers > 1 km^{2} (0.386 sq mi or 247 acres) and river estuaries.

Deux-Verges (French pronunciation: [dø vɛʁʒ]; Occitan: Las Verjas) is a commune in the département of Cantal in south-central France.

== Population ==
Historical population
Year	Pop.	±% p.a.
1968	63	—
1975	64	+0.23%
1982	69	+1.08%
1990	59	−1.94%
1999	61	+0.37%
2007	59	−0.42%
2012	54	−1.76%
2017	50	−1.53%
2023	55	+1.60%
Source: INSEE

== See also ==
- Communes of the Cantal department
