= Saint-Urcize =

Commune in Auvergne-Rhône-Alpes, France

- Commune
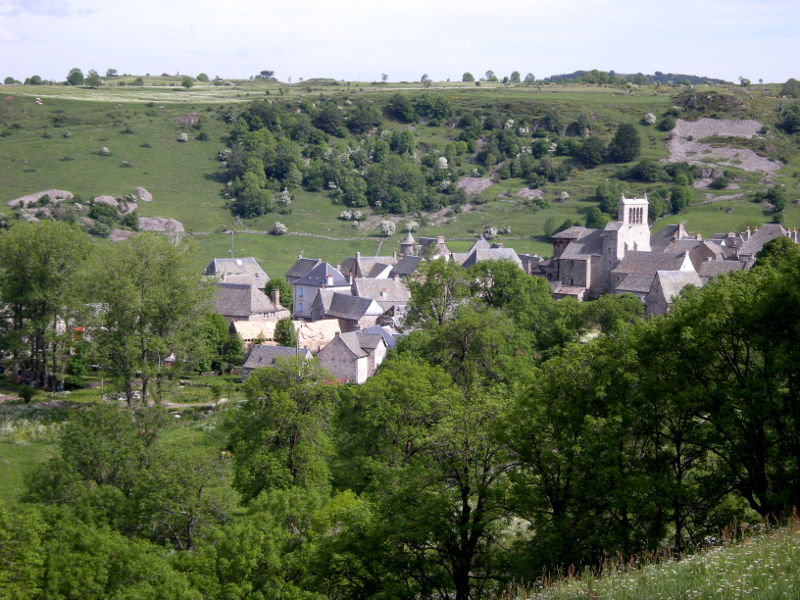
- A general view of Saint-Urcize

- Coat of arms
- Location of Saint-Urcize
- Location within France Location within Auvergne-Rhône-Alpes
- Coordinates: 44°41′51″N 3°00′17″E
- Country: France
- Region: Auvergne-Rhône-Alpes
- Department: Cantal
- Arrondissement: Saint-Flour
- Canton: Neuvéglise-sur-Truyère

Government
  - Mayor (2020–2026): Bernard Remise
- Area^{1}: 54.3 km^{2} (21.0 sq mi)
- Elevation: 1,120 m (3,670 ft)
- Highest elevation: 1,427 m (4,682 ft)
- Lowest elevation: 1,044 m (3,425 ft)
- Population (2023): 475
  - Density: 8.75/km^{2} (22.7/sq mi)
- Time zone: UTC+01:00 (CET)
  - Summer (DST): UTC+02:00 (CEST)
- INSEE/Postal code: 15216 /15110
- ^{1} French Land Register data, which excludes lakes, ponds, glaciers > 1 km^{2} (0.386 sq mi or 247 acres) and river estuaries.

Saint-Urcize (French pronunciation: [sɛ̃.t‿yʁsiz]; Occitan: Sant Urcise) is a commune in the Cantal department in south-central France.

== Population ==
Historical population
Year	Pop.	±% p.a.
1968	654	—
1975	652	−0.04%
1982	510	−3.45%
1990	543	+0.79%
1999	527	−0.33%
2007	501	−0.63%
2012	496	−0.20%
2017	417	−3.41%
2023	475	+2.19%
Source: INSEE

== See also ==
- Communes of the Cantal department
