= La Chapelle-d'Alagnon =

Commune in Auvergne-Rhône-Alpes, France

- Commune
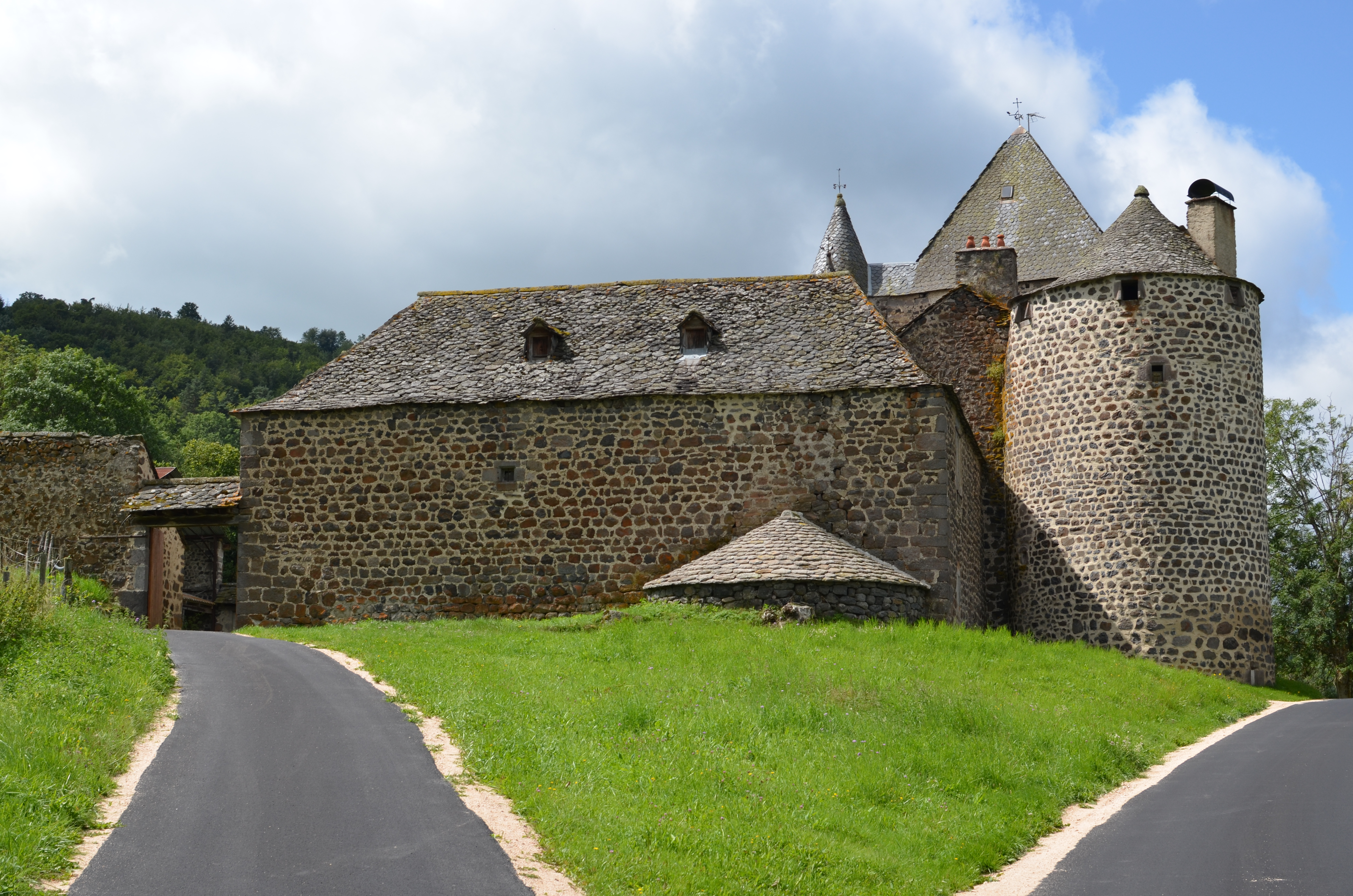
- The Château of Jarrousset
- Location of La Chapelle-d'Alagnon
- Location within France Location within Auvergne-Rhône-Alpes
- Coordinates: 45°06′30″N 2°53′50″E
- Country: France
- Region: Auvergne-Rhône-Alpes
- Department: Cantal
- Arrondissement: Saint-Flour
- Canton: Murat
- Intercommunality: Hautes Terres

Government
  - Mayor (2020–2026): Gérard Pouderoux
- Area^{1}: 9.2 km^{2} (3.6 sq mi)
- Elevation: 882 m (2,894 ft)
- Highest elevation: 1,124 m (3,688 ft)
- Lowest elevation: 860 m (2,820 ft)
- Population (2023): 256
  - Density: 28/km^{2} (72/sq mi)
- Time zone: UTC+01:00 (CET)
  - Summer (DST): UTC+02:00 (CEST)
- INSEE/Postal code: 15041 /15300
- ^{1} French Land Register data, which excludes lakes, ponds, glaciers > 1 km^{2} (0.386 sq mi or 247 acres) and river estuaries.

La Chapelle-d'Alagnon (French pronunciation: [la ʃapɛl dalaɲɔ̃]; Occitan: La Chapèla d'Alanhon) is a commune in the Cantal department in south-central France.

== Population ==
Historical population
Year	Pop.	±% p.a.
1968	264	—
1975	239	−1.41%
1982	246	+0.41%
1990	236	−0.52%
1999	250	+0.64%
2007	241	−0.46%
2012	242	+0.08%
2017	249	+0.57%
2023	256	+0.46%
Source: INSEE

== See also ==
- Communes of the Cantal department
