= Valjouze =

Commune in Auvergne-Rhône-Alpes, France

- Commune
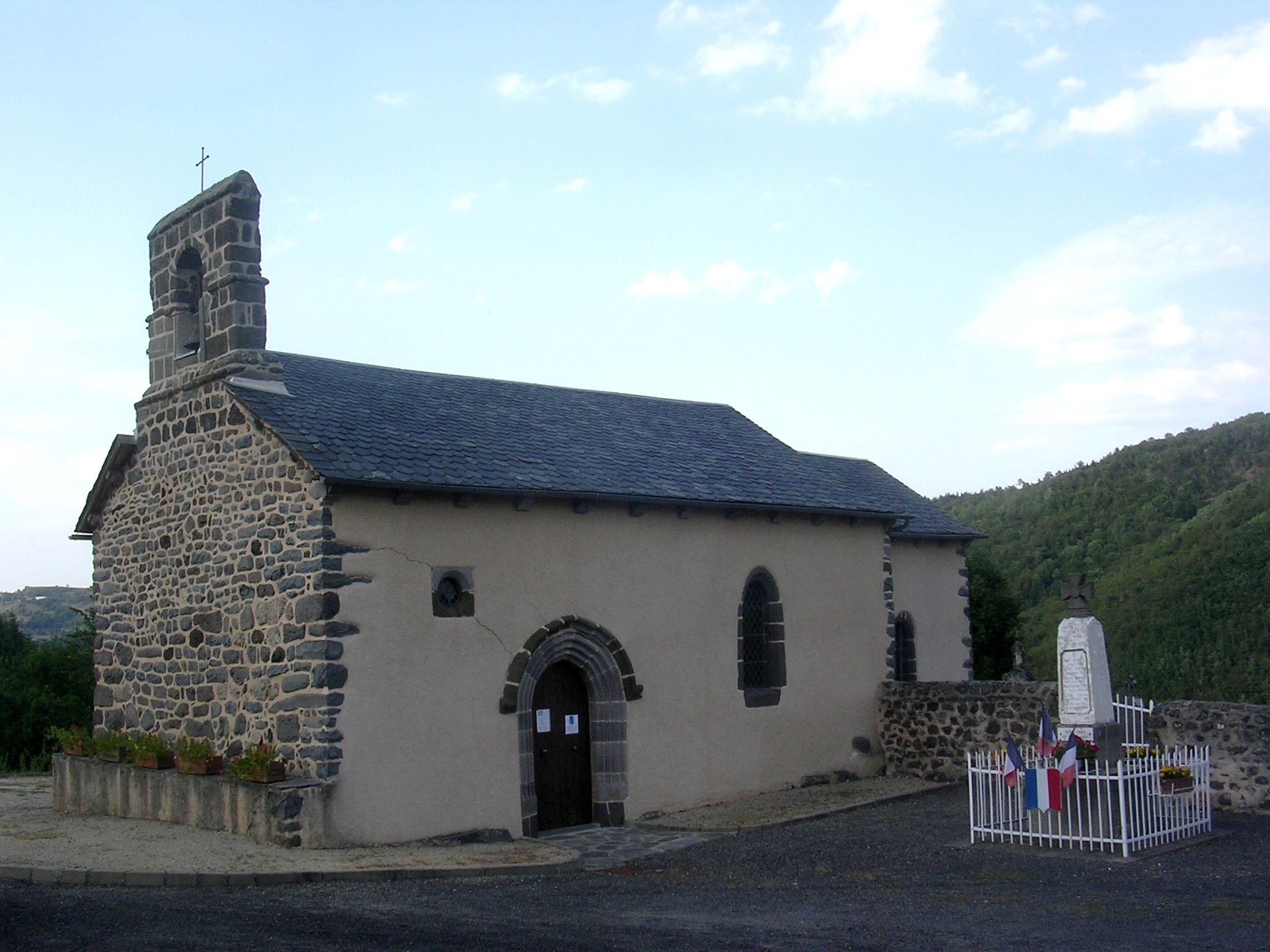
- The church in Valjouse
- Location of Valjouze
- Location within France Location within Auvergne-Rhône-Alpes
- Coordinates: 45°09′49″N 3°03′39″E
- Country: France
- Region: Auvergne-Rhône-Alpes
- Department: Cantal
- Arrondissement: Saint-Flour
- Canton: Saint-Flour-1

Government
  - Mayor (2020–2026): Éric Job
- Area^{1}: 3.05 km^{2} (1.18 sq mi)
- Elevation: 768 m (2,520 ft)
- Highest elevation: 1,101 m (3,612 ft)
- Lowest elevation: 712 m (2,336 ft)
- Population (2023): 26
  - Density: 8.5/km^{2} (22/sq mi)
- Time zone: UTC+01:00 (CET)
  - Summer (DST): UTC+02:00 (CEST)
- INSEE/Postal code: 15247 /15170
- ^{1} French Land Register data, which excludes lakes, ponds, glaciers > 1 km^{2} (0.386 sq mi or 247 acres) and river estuaries.

Valjouze (French pronunciation: [valʒuz]; Occitan: Valjosa) is a commune in the Cantal department in south-central France.

== Population ==
Historical population
Year	Pop.	±% p.a.
1968	54	—
1975	31	−7.62%
1982	36	+2.16%
1990	28	−3.09%
1999	23	−2.16%
2007	26	+1.54%
2012	24	−1.59%
2017	24	+0.00%
2023	26	+1.34%
Source: INSEE

== See also ==
- Communes of the Cantal department
