= La Trinitat =

Commune in Auvergne-Rhône-Alpes, France

- Commune
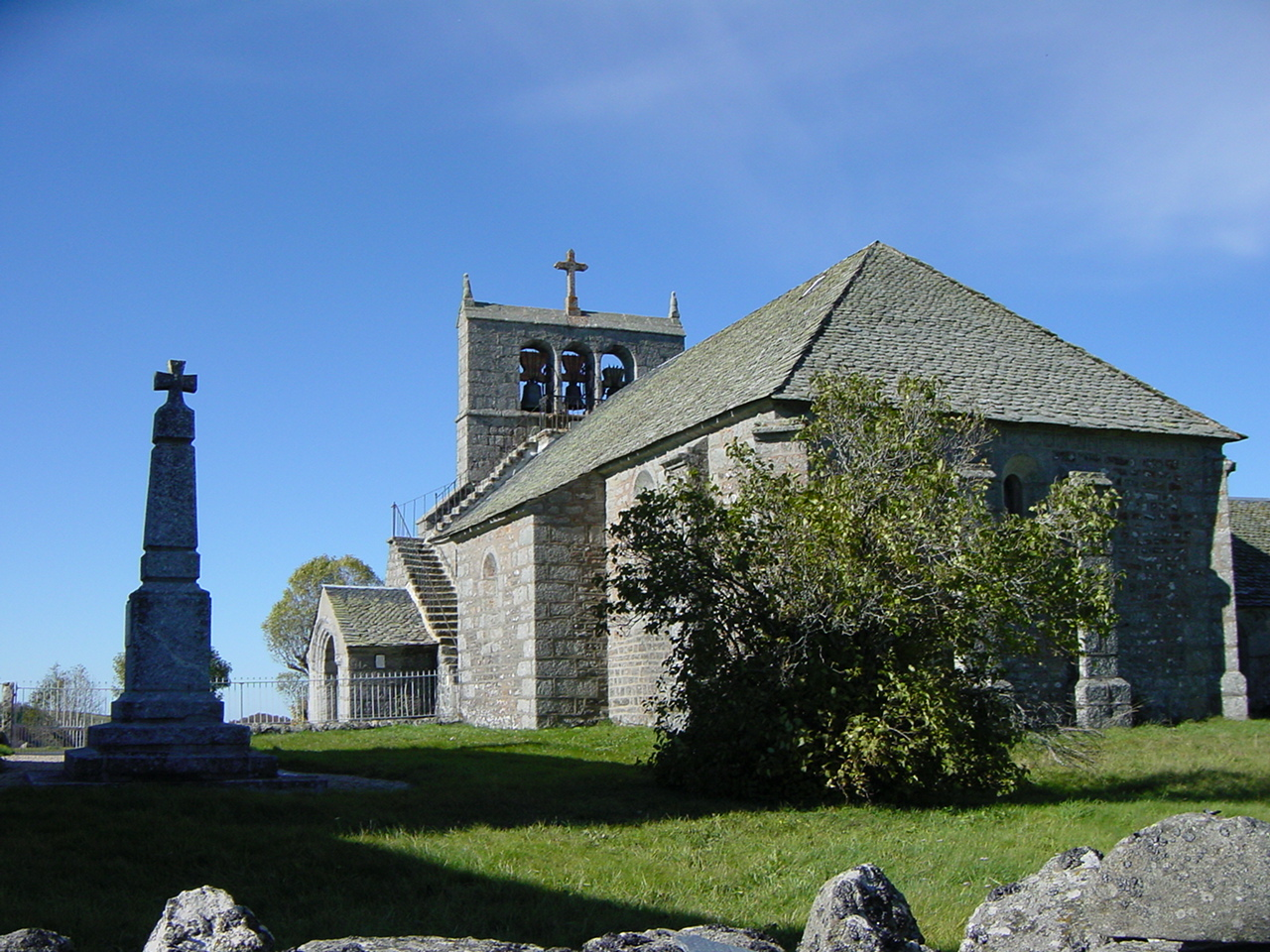
- The church in La Trinitat
- Location of La Trinitat
- Location within France Location within Auvergne-Rhône-Alpes
- Coordinates: 44°44′58″N 2°56′31″E
- Country: France
- Region: Auvergne-Rhône-Alpes
- Department: Cantal
- Arrondissement: Saint-Flour
- Canton: Neuvéglise-sur-Truyère

Government
  - Mayor (2020–2026): Frédéric Astruc
- Area^{1}: 17.57 km^{2} (6.78 sq mi)
- Elevation: 1,209 m (3,967 ft)
- Highest elevation: 1,310 m (4,300 ft)
- Lowest elevation: 1,035 m (3,396 ft)
- Population (2023): 52
  - Density: 3.0/km^{2} (7.7/sq mi)
- Time zone: UTC+01:00 (CET)
  - Summer (DST): UTC+02:00 (CEST)
- INSEE/Postal code: 15241 /15110
- ^{1} French Land Register data, which excludes lakes, ponds, glaciers > 1 km^{2} (0.386 sq mi or 247 acres) and river estuaries.

La Trinitat (French pronunciation: [la tʁinita]) is a commune in the Cantal department in south-central France.

== Population ==
Historical population
Year	Pop.	±% p.a.
1968	118	—
1975	77	−5.92%
1982	58	−3.97%
1990	63	+1.04%
1999	62	−0.18%
2007	43	−4.47%
2012	48	+2.22%
2017	48	+0.00%
2023	52	+1.34%
Source: INSEE

== See also ==
- Communes of the Cantal department
