= Ruynes-en-Margeride =

Commune in Auvergne-Rhône-Alpes, France

- Commune
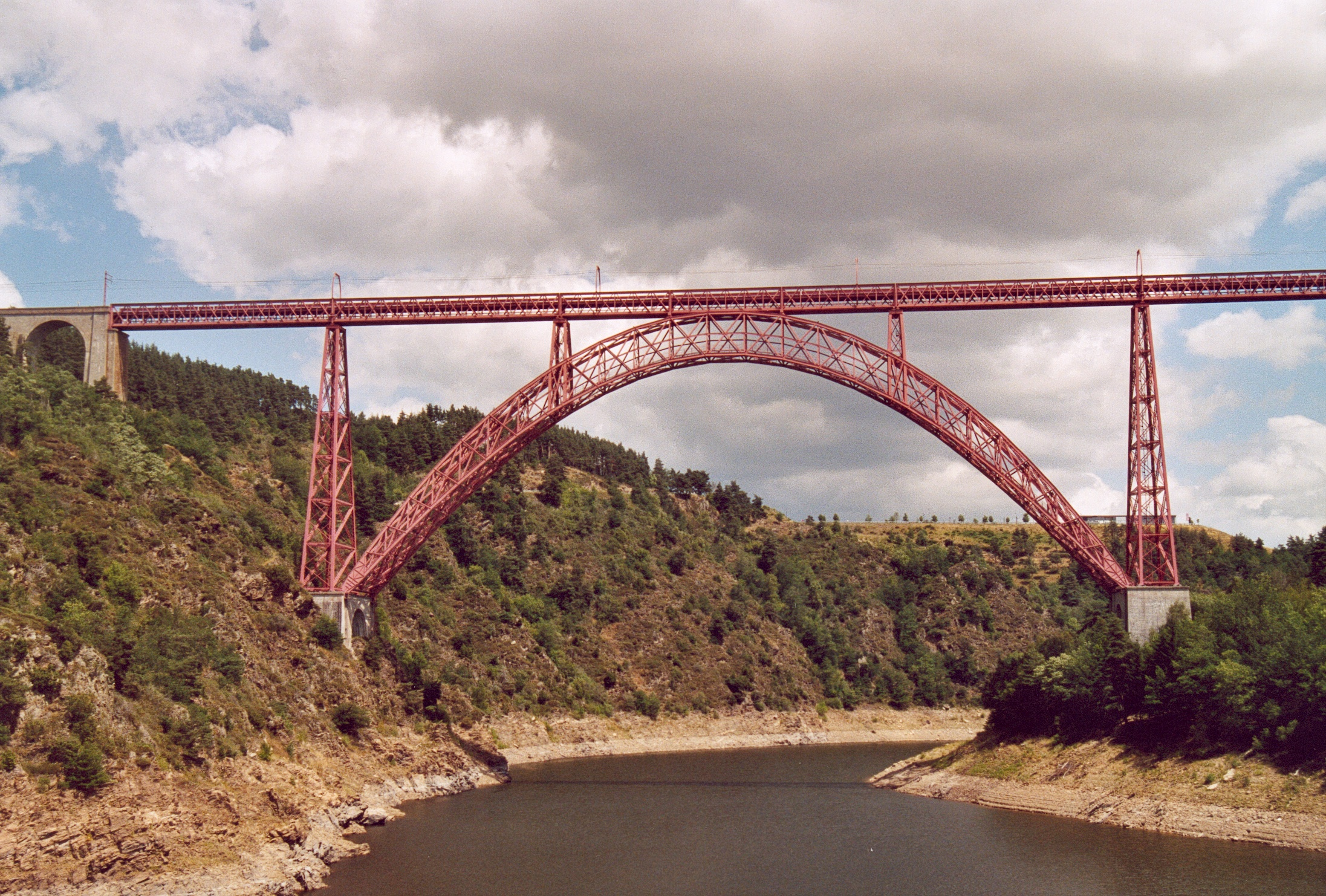
- Garabit viaduct

- Coat of arms
- Location of Ruynes-en-Margeride
- Location within France Location within Auvergne-Rhône-Alpes
- Coordinates: 45°00′10″N 3°13′27″E
- Country: France
- Region: Auvergne-Rhône-Alpes
- Department: Cantal
- Arrondissement: Saint-Flour
- Canton: Neuvéglise-sur-Truyère
- Intercommunality: Saint-Flour Communauté

Government
  - Mayor (2020–2026): François Odoul
- Area^{1}: 29.66 km^{2} (11.45 sq mi)
- Elevation: 920 m (3,020 ft)
- Highest elevation: 1,371 m (4,498 ft)
- Lowest elevation: 724 m (2,375 ft)
- Population (2023): 719
  - Density: 24.2/km^{2} (62.8/sq mi)
- Time zone: UTC+01:00 (CET)
  - Summer (DST): UTC+02:00 (CEST)
- INSEE/Postal code: 15168 /15320
- ^{1} French Land Register data, which excludes lakes, ponds, glaciers > 1 km^{2} (0.386 sq mi or 247 acres) and river estuaries.

Ruynes-en-Margeride (French pronunciation: [ʁɥinz‿en maʁʒʁid]; Occitan: Ruenas de Marjarida [ˈʁwene de maʁʒaˈʁidə], before 1962: Ruines) is a commune in the Cantal department in south-central France.

== Population ==
Historical population
Year	Pop.	±% p.a.
1968	672	—
1975	584	−1.99%
1982	591	+0.17%
1990	605	+0.29%
1999	648	+0.77%
2007	638	−0.19%
2012	620	−0.57%
2017	707	+2.66%
2023	719	+0.28%
Source: INSEE

== See also ==
- Communes of the Cantal department
