= Tiviers =

Commune in Auvergne-Rhône-Alpes, France

- Commune
- Location of Tiviers
- Location within France Location within Auvergne-Rhône-Alpes
- Coordinates: 45°03′43″N 3°09′34″E
- Country: France
- Region: Auvergne-Rhône-Alpes
- Department: Cantal
- Arrondissement: Saint-Flour
- Canton: Saint-Flour-1
- Intercommunality: Saint-Flour Communauté

Government
  - Mayor (2020–2026): Éric Gomesse
- Area^{1}: 13.53 km^{2} (5.22 sq mi)
- Elevation: 830 m (2,720 ft)
- Highest elevation: 1,124 m (3,688 ft)
- Lowest elevation: 818 m (2,684 ft)
- Population (2023): 162
  - Density: 12.0/km^{2} (31.0/sq mi)
- Time zone: UTC+01:00 (CET)
  - Summer (DST): UTC+02:00 (CEST)
- INSEE/Postal code: 15237 /15100
- ^{1} French Land Register data, which excludes lakes, ponds, glaciers > 1 km^{2} (0.386 sq mi or 247 acres) and river estuaries.

Tiviers (French pronunciation: [tivje]; Occitan: Tivièr) is a commune in the Cantal department in south-central France.

== Population ==
Historical population
Year	Pop.	±% p.a.
1968	148	—
1975	137	−1.10%
1982	129	−0.86%
1990	129	+0.00%
1999	145	+1.31%
2007	143	−0.17%
2012	165	+2.90%
2017	172	+0.83%
2023	162	−0.99%
Source: INSEE

== See also ==
- Communes of the Cantal department
