= Lorcières =

Commune in Auvergne-Rhône-Alpes, France

- Commune
- Location of Lorcières
- Location within France Location within Auvergne-Rhône-Alpes
- Coordinates: 44°57′30″N 3°16′29″E
- Country: France
- Region: Auvergne-Rhône-Alpes
- Department: Cantal
- Arrondissement: Saint-Flour
- Canton: Neuvéglise-sur-Truyère
- Intercommunality: Saint-Flour Communauté

Government
  - Mayor (2020–2026): Joël Brun
- Area^{1}: 21.82 km^{2} (8.42 sq mi)
- Elevation: 820 m (2,690 ft)
- Highest elevation: 1,341 m (4,400 ft)
- Lowest elevation: 760 m (2,490 ft)
- Population (2023): 162
  - Density: 7.42/km^{2} (19.2/sq mi)
- Time zone: UTC+01:00 (CET)
  - Summer (DST): UTC+02:00 (CEST)
- INSEE/Postal code: 15107 /15320
- ^{1} French Land Register data, which excludes lakes, ponds, glaciers > 1 km^{2} (0.386 sq mi or 247 acres) and river estuaries.

Lorcières (French pronunciation: [lɔʁsjɛʁ]；Occitan: Lorsèira) is a commune in the Cantal department in south-central France.

== Population ==
Historical population
Year	Pop.	±% p.a.
1968	330	—
1975	271	−2.77%
1982	259	−0.64%
1990	263	+0.19%
1999	222	−1.87%
2007	205	−0.99%
2012	182	−2.35%
2017	173	−1.01%
2023	162	−1.09%
Source: INSEE

== See also ==
- Communes of the Cantal department
