= Malbo =

Commune in Auvergne-Rhône-Alpes, France

- Commune
- Location of Malbo
- Location within France Location within Auvergne-Rhône-Alpes
- Coordinates: 44°58′27″N 2°45′25″E
- Country: France
- Region: Auvergne-Rhône-Alpes
- Department: Cantal
- Arrondissement: Saint-Flour
- Canton: Saint-Flour-2
- Intercommunality: Saint-Flour Communauté

Government
  - Mayor (2023–2026): Christian Riss
- Area^{1}: 29.34 km^{2} (11.33 sq mi)
- Elevation: 1,143 m (3,750 ft)
- Highest elevation: 1,612 m (5,289 ft)
- Lowest elevation: 995 m (3,264 ft)
- Population (2023): 90
  - Density: 3.1/km^{2} (7.9/sq mi)
- Time zone: UTC+01:00 (CET)
  - Summer (DST): UTC+02:00 (CEST)
- INSEE/Postal code: 15112 /15230
- ^{1} French Land Register data, which excludes lakes, ponds, glaciers > 1 km^{2} (0.386 sq mi or 247 acres) and river estuaries.

Malbo (French pronunciation: [malbo]; Occitan: Maubòsc) is a commune in the Cantal department in south-central France.

== Population ==
Historical population
Year	Pop.	±% p.a.
1968	273	—
1975	203	−4.14%
1982	186	−1.24%
1990	148	−2.82%
1999	121	−2.21%
2007	124	+0.31%
2012	115	−1.50%
2017	97	−3.35%
2023	90	−1.24%
Source: INSEE

== See also ==
- Communes of the Cantal department
