= Paulhenc =

Commune in Auvergne-Rhône-Alpes, France

- Commune
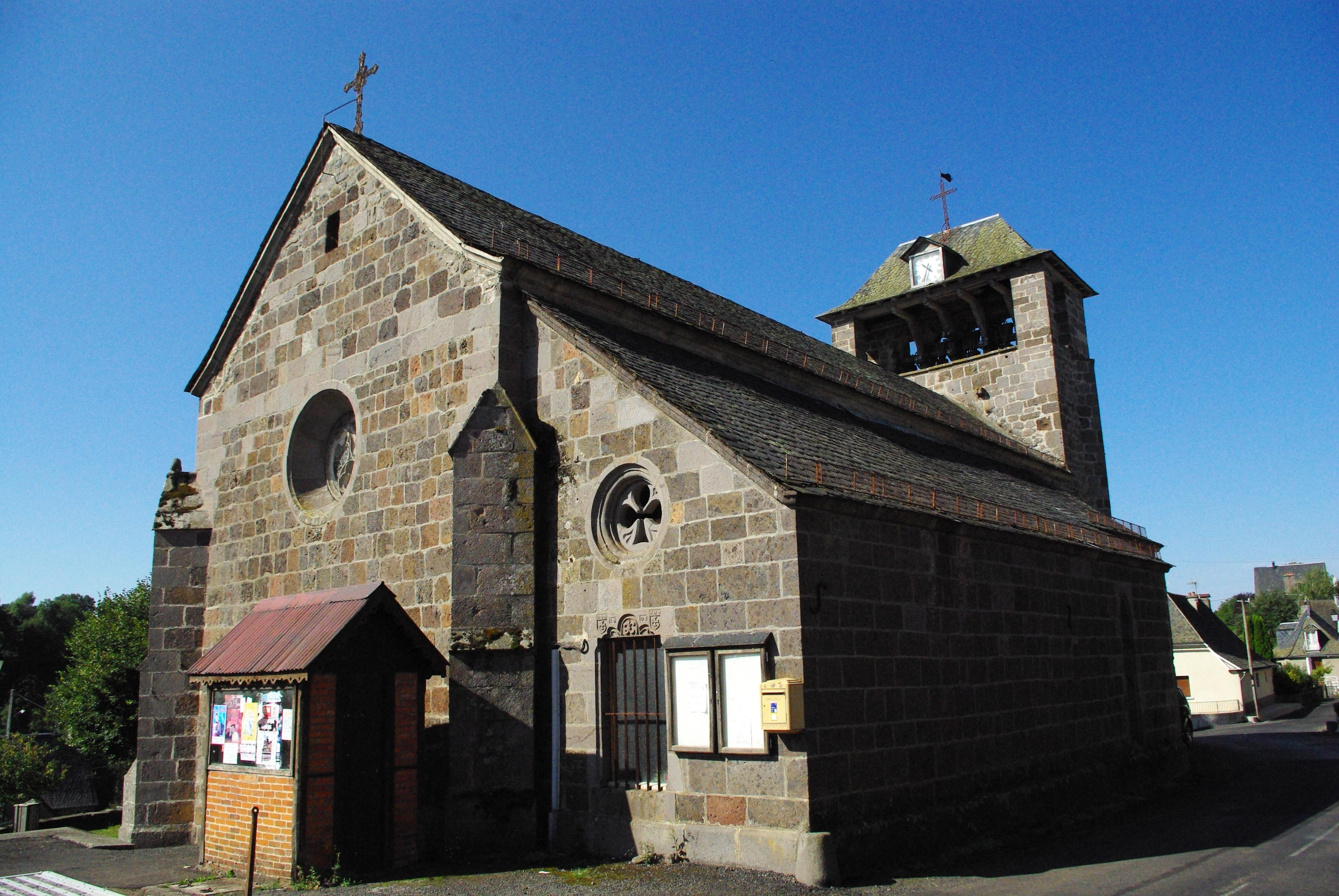
- The church in Paulhenc
- Location of Paulhenc
- Location within France Location within Auvergne-Rhône-Alpes
- Coordinates: 44°53′26″N 2°49′05″E
- Country: France
- Region: Auvergne-Rhône-Alpes
- Department: Cantal
- Arrondissement: Saint-Flour
- Canton: Saint-Flour-2

Government
  - Mayor (2020–2026): David Vital
- Area^{1}: 23.69 km^{2} (9.15 sq mi)
- Elevation: 940 m (3,080 ft)
- Highest elevation: 961 m (3,153 ft)
- Lowest elevation: 646 m (2,119 ft)
- Population (2023): 256
  - Density: 10.8/km^{2} (28.0/sq mi)
- Time zone: UTC+01:00 (CET)
  - Summer (DST): UTC+02:00 (CEST)
- INSEE/Postal code: 15149 /15230
- ^{1} French Land Register data, which excludes lakes, ponds, glaciers > 1 km^{2} (0.386 sq mi or 247 acres) and river estuaries.

Paulhenc is a commune in the Cantal department in south-central France.

== Population ==
Historical population
Year	Pop.	±% p.a.
1968	509	—
1975	422	−2.64%
1982	376	−1.64%
1990	317	−2.11%
1999	283	−1.25%
2007	268	−0.68%
2012	246	−1.70%
2017	252	+0.48%
2023	256	+0.26%
Source: INSEE

== See also ==
- Communes of the Cantal department
