= Arrondissement of Saint-Flour =

Coordinates: 45°02′02″N 3°05′23″E

Saint-Flour
- Arrondissement
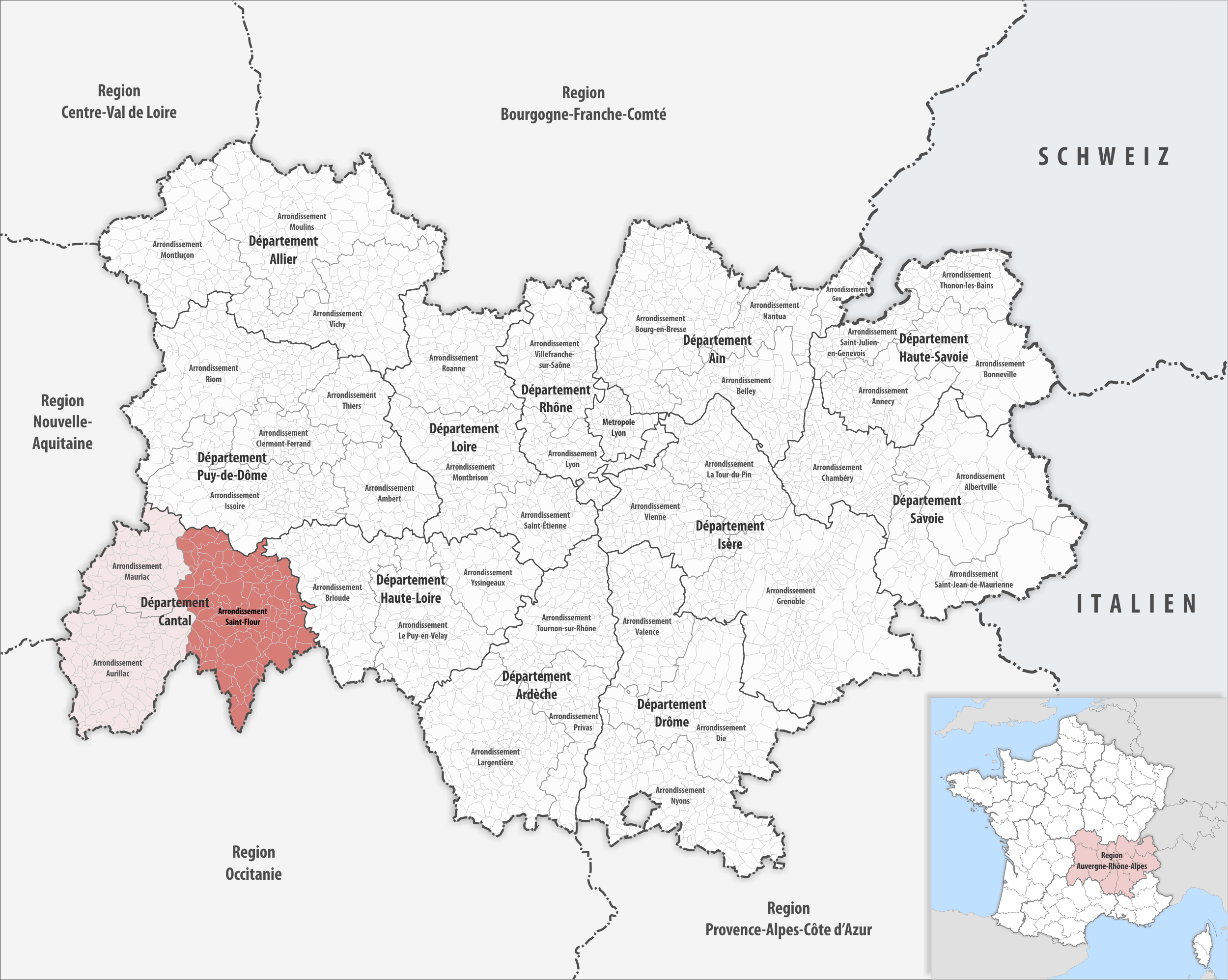
- Location within the region Auvergne-Rhône-Alpes
- Country: France
- Region: Auvergne-Rhône-Alpes
- Department: Cantal
- No. of communes: {{{nbcomm}}}
- Area: 2,510.6 km^{2} (969.3 sq mi)
- Population (2023): 36,460
  - Density: 14.52/km^{2} (37.61/sq mi)
- INSEE code: 153

The arrondissement of Saint-Flour is an arrondissement of France in the Cantal department in the Auvergne-Rhône-Alpes region. It has 98 communes. Its population is 36,904 (2021), and its area is 2,510.6 km^{2} (969.3 sq mi).

== Composition ==
The communes of the arrondissement of Saint-Flour, and their INSEE codes, are:

1. Albepierre-Bredons (15025)
2. Allanche (15001)
3. Alleuze (15002)
4. Andelat (15004)
5. Anglards-de-Saint-Flour (15005)
6. Anterrieux (15007)
7. Auriac-l'Église (15013)
8. Bonnac (15022)
9. Brezons (15026)
10. Celoux (15032)
11. Cézens (15033)
12. Chaliers (15034)
13. Chanterelle (15040)
14. La Chapelle-d'Alagnon (15041)
15. La Chapelle-Laurent (15042)
16. Charmensac (15043)
17. Chaudes-Aigues (15045)
18. Chazelles (15048)
19. Cheylade (15049)
20. Le Claux (15050)
21. Clavières (15051)
22. Coltines (15053)
23. Condat (15054)
24. Coren (15055)
25. Cussac (15059)
26. Deux-Verges (15060)
27. Dienne (15061)
28. Espinasse (15065)
29. Ferrières-Saint-Mary (15069)
30. Fridefont (15073)
31. Gourdièges (15077)
32. Jabrun (15078)
33. Joursac (15080)
34. Lacapelle-Barrès (15086)
35. Landeyrat (15091)
36. Lastic (15097)
37. Laurie (15098)
38. Laveissenet (15100)
39. Laveissière (15101)
40. Lavigerie (15102)
41. Leyvaux (15105)
42. Lieutadès (15106)
43. Lorcières (15107)
44. Lugarde (15110)
45. Malbo (15112)
46. Marcenat (15114)
47. Marchastel (15116)
48. Massiac (15119)
49. Maurines (15121)
50. Mentières (15125)
51. Molèdes (15126)
52. Molompize (15127)
53. Montboudif (15129)
54. Montchamp (15130)
55. Montgreleix (15132)
56. Murat (15138)
57. Narnhac (15139)
58. Neussargues en Pinatelle (15141)
59. Neuvéglise-sur-Truyère (15142)
60. Paulhac (15148)
61. Paulhenc (15149)
62. Peyrusse (15151)
63. Pierrefort (15152)
64. Pradiers (15155)
65. Rageade (15158)
66. Rézentières (15161)
67. Roffiac (15164)
68. Ruynes-en-Margeride (15168)
69. Saint-Amandin (15170)
70. Saint-Bonnet-de-Condat (15173)
71. Sainte-Marie (15198)
72. Saint-Flour (15187)
73. Saint-Georges (15188)
74. Saint-Martial (15199)
75. Saint-Martin-sous-Vigouroux (15201)
76. Saint-Mary-le-Plain (15203)
77. Saint-Poncy (15207)
78. Saint-Rémy-de-Chaudes-Aigues (15209)
79. Saint-Saturnin (15213)
80. Saint-Urcize (15216)
81. Ségur-les-Villas (15225)
82. Soulages (15229)
83. Talizat (15231)
84. Tanavelle (15232)
85. Les Ternes (15235)
86. Tiviers (15237)
87. La Trinitat (15241)
88. Ussel (15244)
89. Vabres (15245)
90. Val-d'Arcomie (15108)
91. Valjouze (15247)
92. Valuéjols (15248)
93. Védrines-Saint-Loup (15251)
94. Vernols (15253)
95. Vèze (15256)
96. Vieillespesse (15259)
97. Villedieu (15262)
98. Virargues (15263)

== History ==
The arrondissement of Saint-Flour was created in 1800.

As a result of the reorganisation of the cantons of France which came into effect in 2015, the borders of the cantons are no longer related to the borders of the arrondissements. The cantons of the arrondissement of Saint-Flour were, as of January 2015:

1. Allanche
2. Chaudes-Aigues
3. Condat
4. Massiac
5. Murat
6. Pierrefort
7. Ruynes-en-Margeride
8. Saint-Flour-Nord
9. Saint-Flour-Sud
