= Communes of the Cantal department =

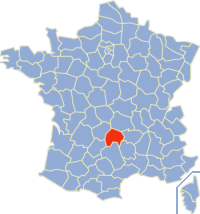

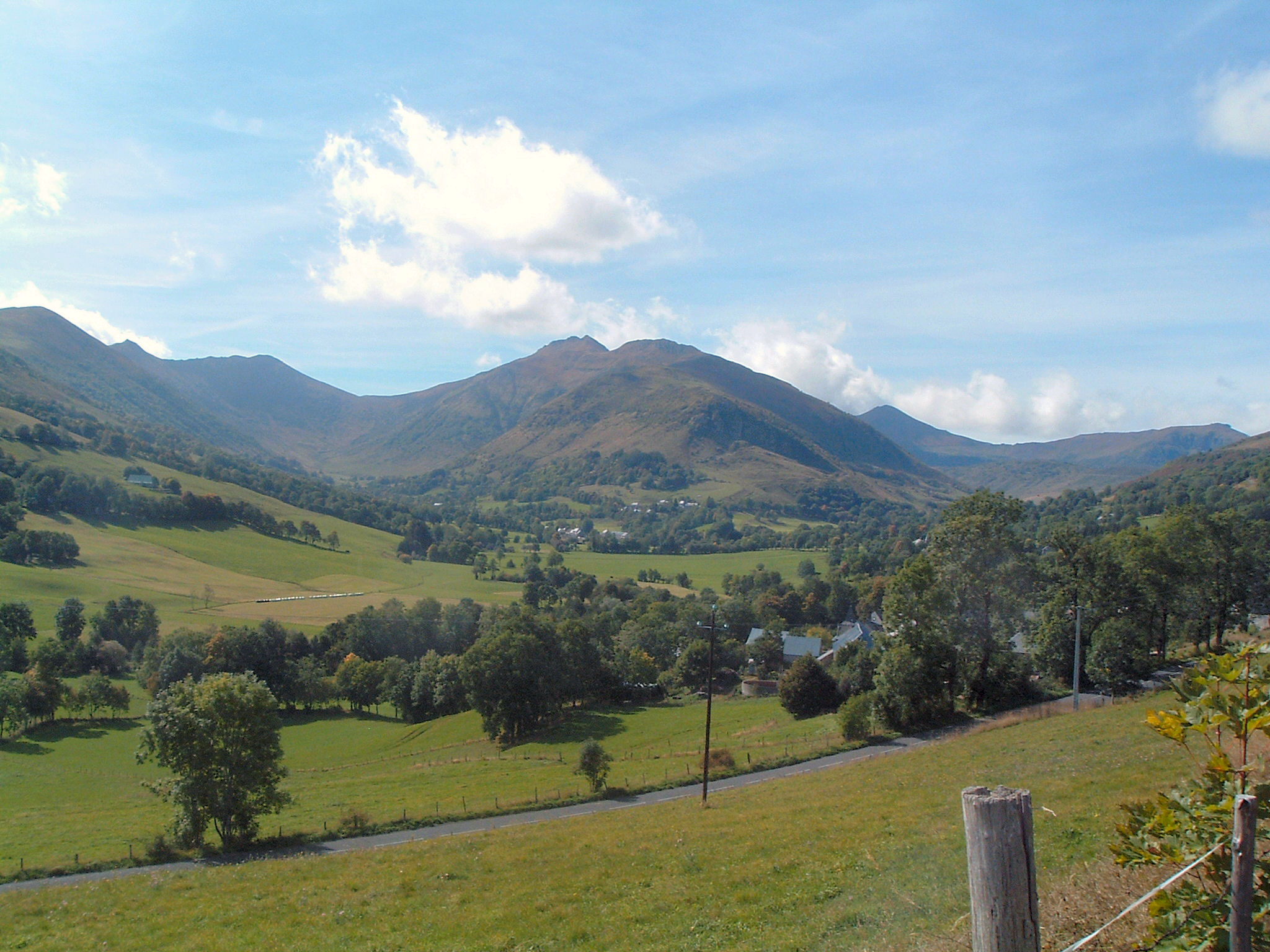

The following is a list of the 250 communes of the Cantal department of France.

== Intercommunalities ==
The communes cooperate in the following intercommunalities (as of 2025):

- (CABA) CA Aurillac Agglomération
- (CCCGC) Communauté de communes de Cère et Goul en Carladès
- (CCCC) Communauté de communes de la Châtaigneraie Cantalienne
- (CCMS) Communauté de communes du Massif du Sancy (partly)
- (CCPG) Communauté de communes du Pays Gentiane
- (CCPM) Communauté de communes du Pays de Mauriac
- (CCPS) Communauté de communes du Pays de Salers
- (CCSA) Communauté de communes Sumène Artense
- (HTC) Hautes Terres Communauté
- (SFC) Saint-Flour Communauté

== List of communes ==
INSEE	Postal	Commune
15025	15300	Albepierre-Bredons ^{(HTC)}
15001	15160	Allanche ^{(HTC)}
15002	15100	Alleuze ^{(SFC)}
15003	15700	Ally ^{(CCPS)}
15004	15100	Andelat ^{(SFC)}
15005	15100	Anglards-de-Saint-Flour ^{(SFC)}
15006	15380	Anglards-de-Salers ^{(CCPS)}
15007	15110	Anterrieux ^{(SFC)}
15008	15240	Antignac ^{(CCSA)}
15009	15400	Apchon ^{(CCPG)}
15010	15200	Arches ^{(CCPM)}
15011	15150	Arnac ^{(CCCC)}
15012	15130	Arpajon-sur-Cère ^{(CABA)}
15013	15500	Auriac-l'Église ^{(CCPMas)}
15014	15000	Aurillac ^{(CABA)}
15015	15240	Auzers ^{(CCPM)}
15016	15250	Ayrens ^{(CABA)}
15017	15800	Badailhac ^{(CCCGC)}
15018	15700	Barriac-les-Bosquets ^{(CCPS)}
15019	15240	Bassignac ^{(CCSA)}
15020	15270	Beaulieu ^{(CCSA)}
15269	15140	Besse ^{(CCPS)}
15021	15600	Boisset ^{(CCCC)}
15022	15500	Bonnac ^{(HTC)}
15024	15700	Brageac ^{(CCPS)}
15026	15230	Brezons ^{(SFC)}
15028	15130	Carlat ^{(CABA)}
15029	15340	Cassaniouze ^{(CCCC)}
15030	15290	Cayrols ^{(CCCC)}
15031	15170	Celles ^{(HTC)}
15032	15500	Celoux ^{(HTC)}
15033	15230	Cézens ^{(SFC)}
15034	15320	Chaliers ^{(SFC)}
15035	15170	Chalinargues ^{(HTC)}
15036	15200	Chalvignac ^{(CCPM)}
15037	15350	Champagnac ^{(CCSA)}
15038	15270	Champs-sur-Tarentaine-Marchal ^{(CCSA)}
15040	15190	Chanterelle ^{(HTC)}
15041	15300	La Chapelle-d'Alagnon ^{(HTC)}
15042	15500	La Chapelle-Laurent ^{(HTC)}
15043	15500	Charmensac ^{(HTC)}
15045	15110	Chaudes-Aigues ^{(SFC)}
15046	15700	Chaussenac ^{(CCPS)}
15047	15300	Chavagnac ^{(HTC)}
15048	15500	Chazelles ^{(HTC)}
15049	15400	Cheylade ^{(CCPG)}
15050	15400	Le Claux ^{(CCPG)}
15051	15320	Clavières ^{(SFC)}
15052	15400	Collandres ^{(CCPG)}
15053	15170	Coltines ^{(SFC)}
15054	15190	Condat ^{(HTC)}
15055	15100	Coren ^{(SFC)}
15056	15250	Crandelles ^{(CABA)}
15057	15150	Cros-de-Montvert ^{(CCCC)}
15058	15130	Cros-de-Ronesque ^{(CCCGC)}
15059	15430	Cussac ^{(SFC)}
15060	15110	Deux-Verges ^{(SFC)}
15061	15300	Dienne ^{(HTC)}
15063	15140	Drugeac ^{(CCPM)}
15064	15700	Escorailles ^{(CCPS)}
15065	15110	Espinasse ^{(SFC)}
15066	15380	Le Falgoux ^{(CCPS)}
15067	15140	Le Fau ^{(CCPS)}
15069	15170	Ferrières-Saint-Mary ^{(HTC)}
15070	15140	Fontanges ^{(CCPS)}
15072	15310	Freix-Anglards ^{(CCPS)}
15073	15110	Fridefont ^{(SFC)}
15074	15130	Giou-de-Mamou ^{(CABA)}
15075	15310	Girgols ^{(CCPS)}
15076	15150	Glénat ^{(CCCC)}
15077	15230	Gourdièges ^{(SFC)}
15078	15110	Jabrun ^{(SFC)}
15079	15200	Jaleyrac ^{(CCPM)}
15080	15170	Joursac ^{(HTC)}
15081	15800	Jou-sous-Monjou ^{(CCCGC)}
15082	15120	Junhac ^{(CCCC)}
15083	15250	Jussac ^{(CABA)}
15084	15120	Labesserette ^{(CCCC)}
15085	15130	Labrousse ^{(CABA)}
15086	15230	Lacapelle-Barrès ^{(SFC)}
15087	15120	Lacapelle-del-Fraisse ^{(CCCC)}
15088	15150	Lacapelle-Viescamp ^{(CABA)}
15089	15120	Ladinhac ^{(CCCC)}
15090	15130	Lafeuillade-en-Vézie ^{(CCCC)}
15091	15160	Landeyrat ^{(HTC)}
15092	15270	Lanobre ^{(CCSA)}
15093	15120	Lapeyrugue ^{(CCCC)}
15094	15150	Laroquebrou ^{(CCCC)}
15095	15250	Laroquevieille ^{(CABA)}
15096	15590	Lascelle ^{(CABA)}
15097	15500	Lastic ^{(SFC)}
15098	15500	Laurie ^{(HTC)}
15100	15300	Laveissenet ^{(HTC)}
15101	15300	Laveissière ^{(HTC)}
15102	15300	Lavigerie ^{(HTC)}
15103	15120	Leucamp ^{(CCCC)}
15104	15600	Leynhac ^{(CCCC)}
15105	43450	Leyvaux ^{(HTC)}
15106	15110	Lieutadès ^{(SFC)}
15107	15320	Lorcières ^{(SFC)}
15110	15190	Lugarde ^{(CCPG)}
15111	15210	Madic ^{(CCSA)}
15112	15230	Malbo ^{(SFC)}
15113	15590	Mandailles-Saint-Julien ^{(CABA)}
15114	15190	Marcenat ^{(HTC)}
15116	15400	Marchastel ^{(CCPG)}
15117	15220	Marcolès ^{(CCCC)}
15118	15250	Marmanhac ^{(CABA)}
15119	15500	Massiac ^{(HTC)}
15120	15200	Mauriac ^{(CCPM)}
15121	15110	Maurines ^{(SFC)}
15122	15600	Maurs ^{(CCCC)}
15123	15200	Méallet ^{(CCPM)}
15124	15400	Menet ^{(CCPG)}
15125	15100	Mentières ^{(SFC)}
15126	15500	Molèdes ^{(HTC)}
15127	15500	Molompize ^{(HTC)}
15128	15240	La Monselie ^{(CCSA)}
15129	15190	Montboudif ^{(HTC)}
15130	15100	Montchamp ^{(SFC)}
15131	15240	Le Monteil ^{(CCSA)}
15132	15190	Montgreleix ^{(CCMS)}
15133	15600	Montmurat ^{(CCCC)}
15134	15120	Montsalvy ^{(CCCC)}

INSEE	Postal	Commune
15135	15150	Montvert ^{(CCCC)}
15137	15380	Moussages ^{(CCPM)}
15138	15300	Murat ^{(HTC)}
15139	15230	Narnhac ^{(SFC)}
15140	15250	Naucelles ^{(CABA)}
15141	15170	Neussargues-Moissac ^{(HTC)}
15142	15260	Neuvéglise-sur-Truyère ^{(SFC)}
15143	15150	Nieudan ^{(CCCC)}
15144	15290	Omps ^{(CCCC)}
15146	15800	Pailherols ^{(CCCGC)}
15147	15290	Parlan ^{(CCCC)}
15148	15430	Paulhac ^{(SFC)}
15149	15230	Paulhenc ^{(SFC)}
15151	15170	Peyrusse ^{(HTC)}
15152	15230	Pierrefort ^{(SFC)}
15153	15700	Pleaux ^{(CCPS)}
15154	15800	Polminhac ^{(CCCGC)}
15155	15160	Pradiers ^{(HTC)}
15156	15130	Prunet ^{(CCCC)}
15027	15340	Puycapel ^{(CCCC)}
15157	15600	Quézac ^{(CCCC)}
15158	15500	Rageade ^{(HTC)}
15159	15800	Raulhac ^{(CCCGC)}
15160	15250	Reilhac ^{(CABA)}
15161	15170	Rézentières ^{(SFC)}
15162	15400	Riom-ès-Montagnes ^{(CCPG)}
15163	15220	Roannes-Saint-Mary ^{(CCCC)}
15164	15100	Roffiac ^{(SFC)}
15165	15150	Rouffiac ^{(CCCC)}
15268	15290	Le Rouget-Pers ^{(CCCC)}
15166	15290	Roumégoux ^{(CCCC)}
15167	15600	Rouziers ^{(CCCC)}
15168	15320	Ruynes-en-Margeride ^{(SFC)}
15169	15240	Saignes ^{(CCSA)}
15170	15190	Saint-Amandin ^{(CCPG)}
15172	15220	Saint-Antoine ^{(CCCC)}
15173	15190	Saint-Bonnet-de-Condat ^{(HTC)}
15174	15140	Saint-Bonnet-de-Salers ^{(CCPS)}
15175	15310	Saint-Cernin ^{(CCPS)}
15176	15140	Saint-Chamant ^{(CCPS)}
15178	15590	Saint-Cirgues-de-Jordanne ^{(CABA)}
15179	15140	Saint-Cirgues-de-Malbert ^{(CCPS)}
15180	15800	Saint-Clément ^{(CCCGC)}
15181	15600	Saint-Constant-Fournoulès ^{(CCCC)}
15171	15170	Sainte-Anastasie ^{(HTC)}
15186	15140	Sainte-Eulalie ^{(CCPS)}
15198	15230	Sainte-Marie ^{(SFC)}
15182	15150	Saint-Étienne-Cantalès ^{(CCCC)}
15183	15130	Saint-Étienne-de-Carlat ^{(CCCGC)}
15185	15400	Saint-Étienne-de-Chomeil ^{(CCPG)}
15184	15600	Saint-Étienne-de-Maurs ^{(CCCC)}
15187	15100	Saint-Flour ^{(SFC)}
15188	15100	Saint-Georges ^{(SFC)}
15189	15150	Saint-Gérons ^{(CCCC)}
15190	15400	Saint-Hippolyte ^{(CCPG)}
15191	15310	Saint-Illide ^{(CCPS)}
15192	15800	Saint-Jacques-des-Blats ^{(CCCGC)}
15194	15600	Saint-Julien-de-Toursac ^{(CCCC)}
15196	15220	Saint-Mamet-la-Salvetat ^{(CCCC)}
15199	15110	Saint-Martial ^{(SFC)}
15200	15140	Saint-Martin-Cantalès ^{(CCPS)}
15201	15230	Saint-Martin-sous-Vigouroux ^{(SFC)}
15202	15140	Saint-Martin-Valmeroux ^{(CCPS)}
15203	15500	Saint-Mary-le-Plain ^{(HTC)}
15205	15140	Saint-Paul-de-Salers ^{(CCPS)}
15204	15250	Saint-Paul-des-Landes ^{(CABA)}
15206	15350	Saint-Pierre
15207	15500	Saint-Poncy ^{(HTC)}
15208	15140	Saint-Projet-de-Salers ^{(CCPS)}
15209	15110	Saint-Rémy-de-Chaudes-Aigues ^{(SFC)}
15211	15150	Saint-Santin-Cantalès ^{(CCCC)}
15212	15600	Saint-Santin-de-Maurs ^{(CCCC)}
15213	15190	Saint-Saturnin ^{(HTC)}
15214	15290	Saint-Saury ^{(CCCC)}
15215	15130	Saint-Simon ^{(CABA)}
15216	15110	Saint-Urcize ^{(SFC)}
15217	15150	Saint-Victor ^{(CCCC)}
15218	15380	Saint-Vincent-de-Salers ^{(CCPS)}
15219	15140	Salers ^{(CCPS)}
15220	15200	Salins ^{(CCPM)}
15221	15130	Sansac-de-Marmiesse ^{(CABA)}
15222	15120	Sansac-Veinazès ^{(CCCC)}
15223	15240	Sauvat ^{(CCSA)}
15224	15290	La Ségalassière ^{(CCCC)}
15225	15300	Ségur-les-Villas ^{(HTC)}
15226	15340	Sénezergues ^{(CCCC)}
15228	15150	Siran ^{(CCCC)}
15229	15100	Soulages ^{(SFC)}
15230	15200	Sourniac ^{(CCPM)}
15231	15170	Talizat ^{(SFC)}
15232	15100	Tanavelle ^{(SFC)}
15233	15250	Teissières-de-Cornet ^{(CABA)}
15234	15130	Teissières-lès-Bouliès ^{(CCCC)}
15235	15100	Les Ternes ^{(SFC)}
15236	15800	Thiézac ^{(CCCGC)}
15237	15100	Tiviers ^{(SFC)}
15238	15310	Tournemire ^{(CCPS)}
15240	15270	Trémouille ^{(CCSA)}
15241	15110	La Trinitat ^{(SFC)}
15242	15600	Le Trioulou ^{(CCCC)}
15243	15400	Trizac ^{(CCPG)}
15244	15300	Ussel ^{(SFC)}
15245	15100	Vabres ^{(SFC)}
15108	15320	Val-d'Arcomie ^{(SFC)}
15246	15400	Valette ^{(CCPG)}
15247	15170	Valjouze ^{(HTC)}
15248	15300	Valuéjols ^{(SFC)}
15249	15380	Le Vaulmier ^{(CCPS)}
15250	15240	Vebret ^{(CCSA)}
15251	15100	Védrines-Saint-Loup ^{(SFC)}
15252	15590	Velzic ^{(CABA)}
15253	15160	Vernols ^{(HTC)}
15254	15350	Veyrières ^{(CCSA)}
15255	15130	Vézac ^{(CABA)}
15256	15160	Vèze ^{(HTC)}
15257	15130	Vezels-Roussy ^{(CABA)}
15258	15800	Vic-sur-Cère ^{(CCCGC)}
15259	15500	Vieillespesse ^{(SFC)}
15260	15120	Vieillevie ^{(CCCC)}
15261	15200	Le Vigean ^{(CCPM)}
15262	15100	Villedieu ^{(SFC)}
15263	15300	Virargues ^{(HTC)}
15264	15220	Vitrac ^{(CCCC)}
15265	15210	Ydes ^{(CCSA)}
15266	15130	Yolet ^{(CABA)}
15267	15130	Ytrac ^{(CABA)}
