= Saint-Mary-le-Plain =

Commune in Auvergne-Rhône-Alpes, France

- Commune
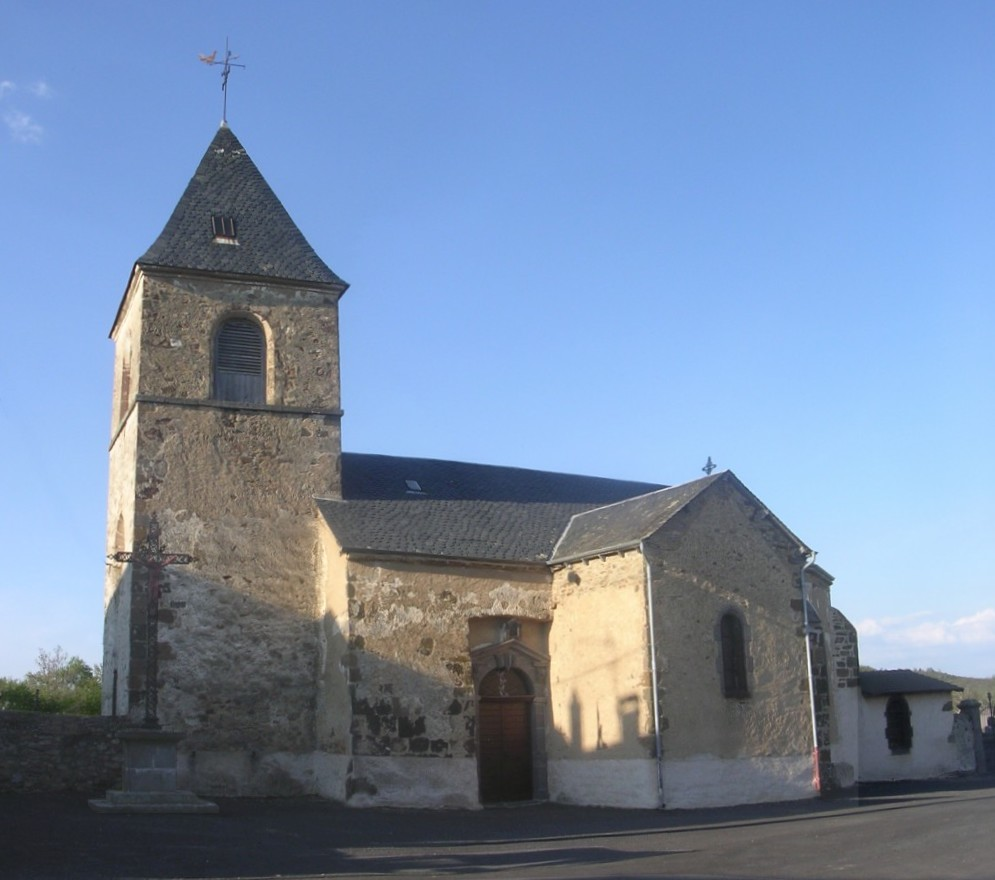
- The church in Saint-Mary-le-Plain
- Location of Saint-Mary-le-Plain
- Location within France Location within Auvergne-Rhône-Alpes
- Coordinates: 45°11′15″N 3°09′45″E
- Country: France
- Region: Auvergne-Rhône-Alpes
- Department: Cantal
- Arrondissement: Saint-Flour
- Canton: Saint-Flour-1

Government
  - Mayor (2020–2026): Jean-Marc Mizoule
- Area^{1}: 21.8 km^{2} (8.4 sq mi)
- Elevation: 867 m (2,844 ft)
- Highest elevation: 1,021 m (3,350 ft)
- Lowest elevation: 640 m (2,100 ft)
- Population (2023): 188
  - Density: 8.62/km^{2} (22.3/sq mi)
- Time zone: UTC+01:00 (CET)
  - Summer (DST): UTC+02:00 (CEST)
- INSEE/Postal code: 15203 /15500
- ^{1} French Land Register data, which excludes lakes, ponds, glaciers > 1 km^{2} (0.386 sq mi or 247 acres) and river estuaries.

Saint-Mary-le-Plain (French pronunciation: [sɛ̃ maʁi lə plɛ̃]; Occitan: Sant Mari lo Plan) is a commune in the Cantal department in south-central France.

== Population ==
Historical population
Year	Pop.	±% p.a.
1968	284	—
1975	245	−2.09%
1982	206	−2.45%
1990	172	−2.23%
1999	156	−1.08%
2007	157	+0.08%
2012	151	−0.78%
2017	159	+1.04%
2023	188	+2.83%
Source: INSEE

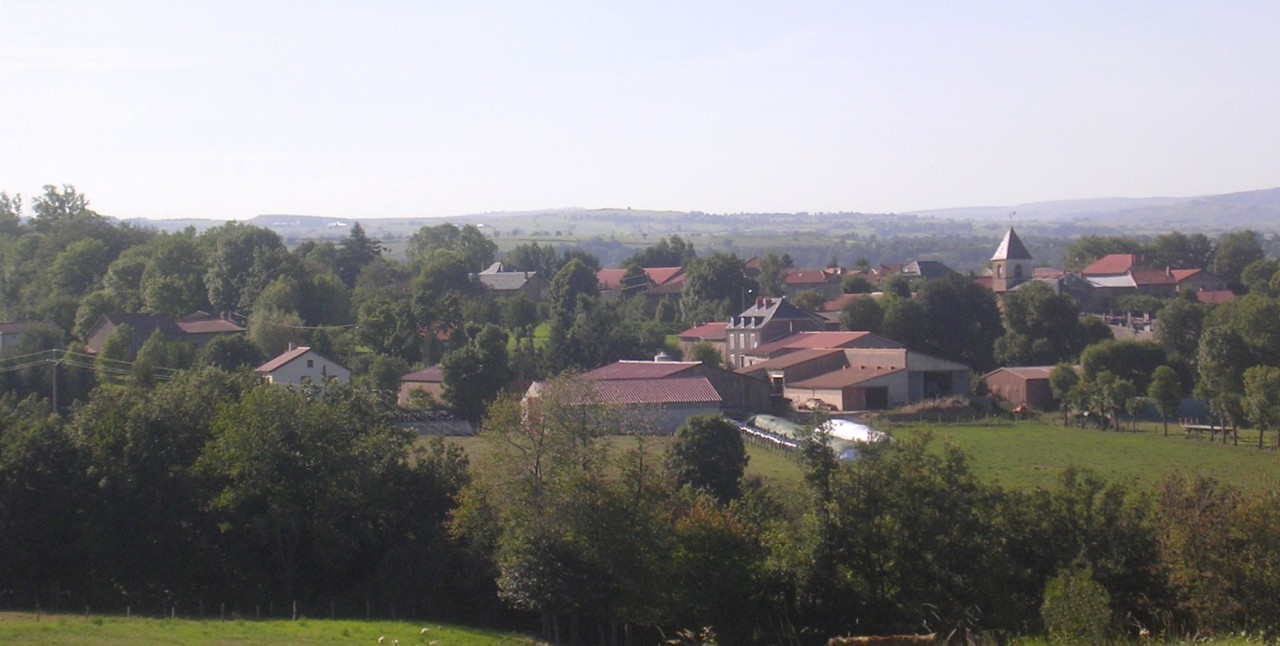

== See also ==
- Communes of the Cantal department
