= Espinasse, Cantal =

Commune in Auvergne-Rhône-Alpes, France

Espinasse
- Commune
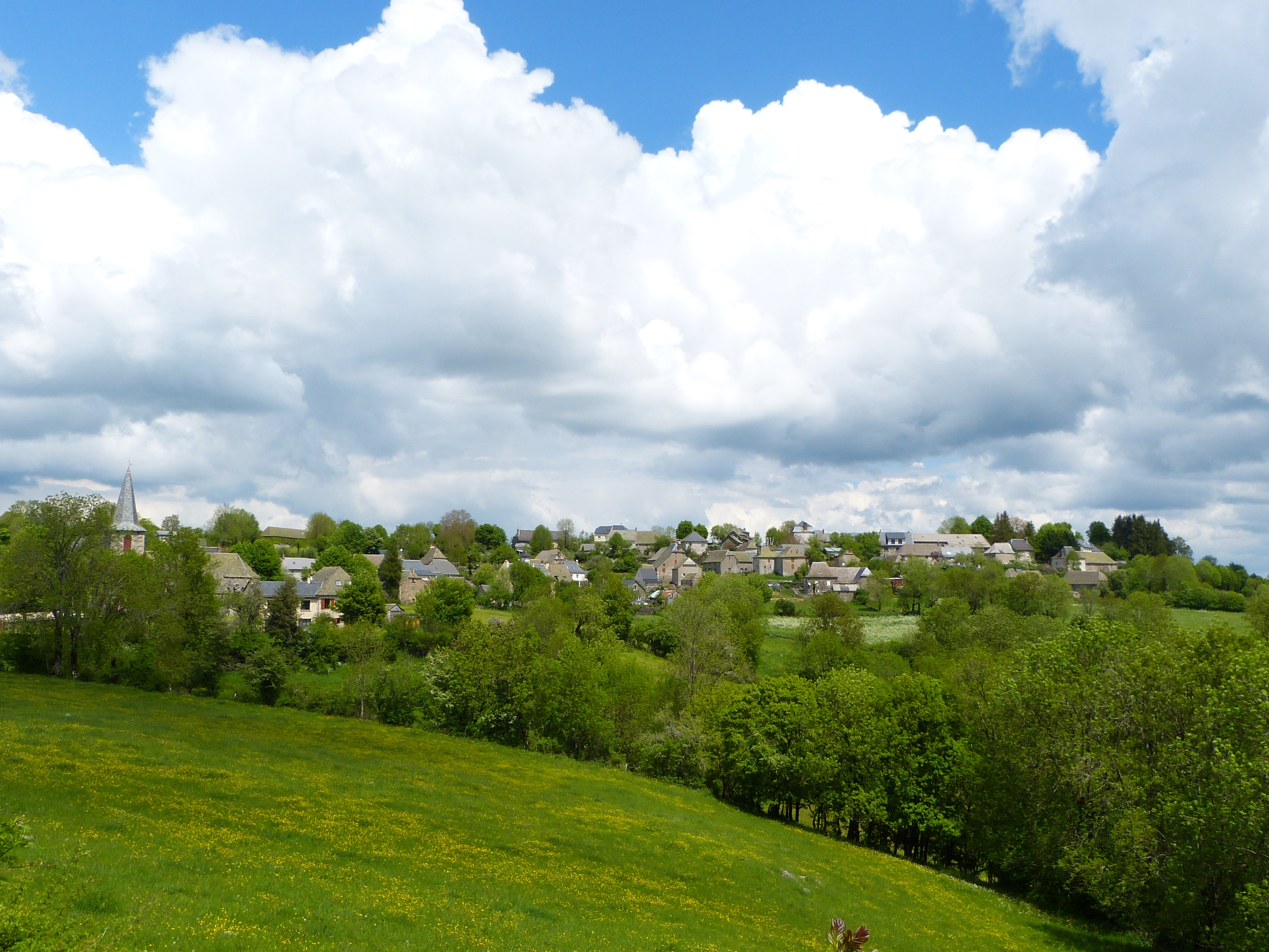
- View of Espinasse
- Location of Espinasse
- Location within France Location within Auvergne-Rhône-Alpes
- Coordinates: 44°52′22″N 2°56′33″E
- Country: France
- Region: Auvergne-Rhône-Alpes
- Department: Cantal
- Arrondissement: Saint-Flour
- Canton: Neuvéglise-sur-Truyère
- Intercommunality: Saint-Flour Communauté

Government
  - Mayor (2020–2026): Christian Gendre
- Area^{1}: 16.72 km^{2} (6.46 sq mi)
- Elevation: 900 m (3,000 ft)
- Highest elevation: 1,064 m (3,491 ft)
- Lowest elevation: 620 m (2,030 ft)
- Population (2023): 79
  - Density: 4.7/km^{2} (12/sq mi)
- Time zone: UTC+01:00 (CET)
  - Summer (DST): UTC+02:00 (CEST)
- INSEE/Postal code: 15065 /15110
- ^{1} French Land Register data, which excludes lakes, ponds, glaciers > 1 km^{2} (0.386 sq mi or 247 acres) and river estuaries.

Espinasse (French pronunciation: [ɛspinas]; Occitan: Espinassa) is a commune in the Cantal department in south-central France.

== Population ==
Historical population
Year	Pop.	±% p.a.
1968	148	—
1975	149	+0.10%
1982	123	−2.70%
1990	92	−3.56%
1999	80	−1.54%
2007	76	−0.64%
2012	69	−1.91%
2017	82	+3.51%
2023	79	−0.62%
Source: INSEE

== See also ==
- Communes of the Cantal department
