= Rézentières =

Commune in Auvergne-Rhône-Alpes, France

- Commune
- Location of Rézentières
- Location within France Location within Auvergne-Rhône-Alpes
- Coordinates: 45°08′05″N 3°06′15″E
- Country: France
- Region: Auvergne-Rhône-Alpes
- Department: Cantal
- Arrondissement: Saint-Flour
- Canton: Saint-Flour-1

Government
  - Mayor (2020–2026): Philippe Echalier
- Area^{1}: 13.29 km^{2} (5.13 sq mi)
- Elevation: 1,076 m (3,530 ft)
- Highest elevation: 1,143 m (3,750 ft)
- Lowest elevation: 760 m (2,490 ft)
- Population (2023): 114
  - Density: 8.58/km^{2} (22.2/sq mi)
- Time zone: UTC+01:00 (CET)
  - Summer (DST): UTC+02:00 (CEST)
- INSEE/Postal code: 15161 /15170
- ^{1} French Land Register data, which excludes lakes, ponds, glaciers > 1 km^{2} (0.386 sq mi or 247 acres) and river estuaries.

Rézentières (French pronunciation: [ʁezɑ̃tjɛʁ]; Occitan: Resenteiras) is a commune in the Cantal department in south-central France.

== Population ==
Historical population
Year	Pop.	±% p.a.
1968	182	—
1975	161	−1.74%
1982	147	−1.29%
1990	129	−1.62%
1999	115	−1.27%
2007	125	+1.05%
2012	118	−1.15%
2017	110	−1.39%
2023	114	+0.60%
Source: INSEE

== See also ==
- Communes of the Cantal department
