= Védrines-Saint-Loup =

Commune in Auvergne-Rhône-Alpes, France

- Commune
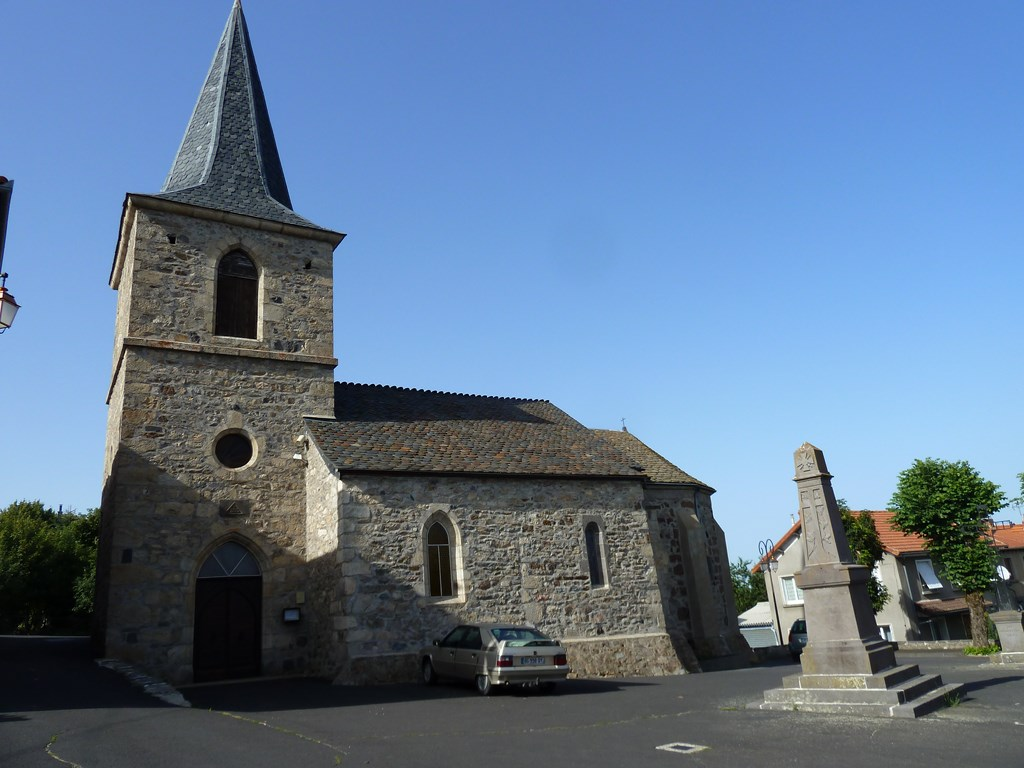
- The church in Védrines-Saint-Loup
- Location of Védrines-Saint-Loup
- Location within France Location within Auvergne-Rhône-Alpes
- Coordinates: 45°04′14″N 3°16′57″E
- Country: France
- Region: Auvergne-Rhône-Alpes
- Department: Cantal
- Arrondissement: Saint-Flour
- Canton: Neuvéglise-sur-Truyère
- Intercommunality: Saint-Flour Communauté

Government
  - Mayor (2020–2026): Jean-Marc Boudou
- Area^{1}: 27.56 km^{2} (10.64 sq mi)
- Elevation: 1,026 m (3,366 ft)
- Highest elevation: 1,372 m (4,501 ft)
- Lowest elevation: 873 m (2,864 ft)
- Population (2023): 118
  - Density: 4.28/km^{2} (11.1/sq mi)
- Time zone: UTC+01:00 (CET)
  - Summer (DST): UTC+02:00 (CEST)
- INSEE/Postal code: 15251 /15100
- ^{1} French Land Register data, which excludes lakes, ponds, glaciers > 1 km^{2} (0.386 sq mi or 247 acres) and river estuaries.

Védrines-Saint-Loup (French pronunciation: [vedʁin sɛ̃ lu]; Occitan: Vedrenas) is a commune in the Cantal department in south-central France.

== Population ==
Historical population
Year	Pop.	±% p.a.
1968	305	—
1975	238	−3.48%
1982	217	−1.31%
1990	184	−2.04%
1999	162	−1.40%
2007	148	−1.12%
2012	139	−1.25%
2017	141	+0.29%
2023	118	−2.92%
Source: INSEE

== See also ==
- Communes of the Cantal department
