= Saint-Georges, Cantal =

Commune in Auvergne-Rhône-Alpes, France

Saint-Georges
- Commune
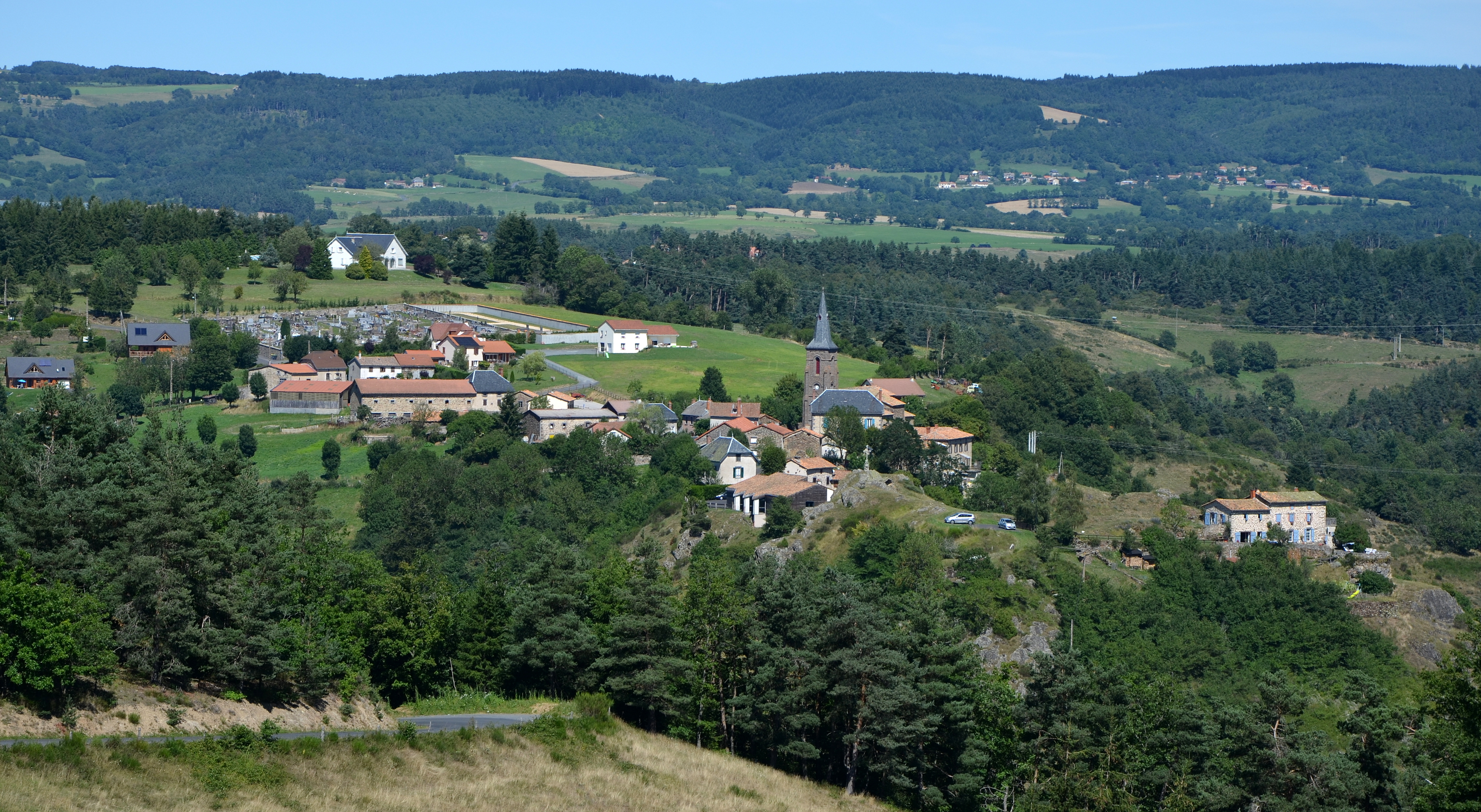
- A general view of Saint-Georges
- Location of Saint-Georges
- Location within France Location within Auvergne-Rhône-Alpes
- Coordinates: 45°01′10″N 3°07′42″E
- Country: France
- Region: Auvergne-Rhône-Alpes
- Department: Cantal
- Arrondissement: Saint-Flour
- Canton: Neuvéglise-sur-Truyère

Government
  - Mayor (2020–2026): Jean-Jacques Monloubou
- Area^{1}: 33.14 km^{2} (12.80 sq mi)
- Elevation: 828 m (2,717 ft)
- Highest elevation: 1,001 m (3,284 ft)
- Lowest elevation: 740 m (2,430 ft)
- Population (2023): 1,171
  - Density: 35.33/km^{2} (91.52/sq mi)
- Time zone: UTC+01:00 (CET)
  - Summer (DST): UTC+02:00 (CEST)
- INSEE/Postal code: 15188 /15100
- ^{1} French Land Register data, which excludes lakes, ponds, glaciers > 1 km^{2} (0.386 sq mi or 247 acres) and river estuaries.

Saint-Georges (French pronunciation: [sɛ̃ ʒɔʁʒ]; Auvergnat: Sant Georges) is a commune in the Cantal department in south-central France.

== Population ==
Historical population
Year	Pop.	±% p.a.
1968	774	—
1975	893	+2.06%
1982	1,036	+2.14%
1990	1,039	+0.04%
1999	939	−1.12%
2007	1,138	+2.43%
2012	1,106	−0.57%
2017	1,177	+1.25%
2023	1,171	−0.09%
Source: INSEE

== See also ==
- Communes of the Cantal department
