= Saint-Rémy-de-Chaudes-Aigues =

Commune in Auvergne-Rhône-Alpes, France

Saint-Rémy-de-Chaudes-Aigues Sent Remise de Chaldas Aigas (Occitan)
- Commune
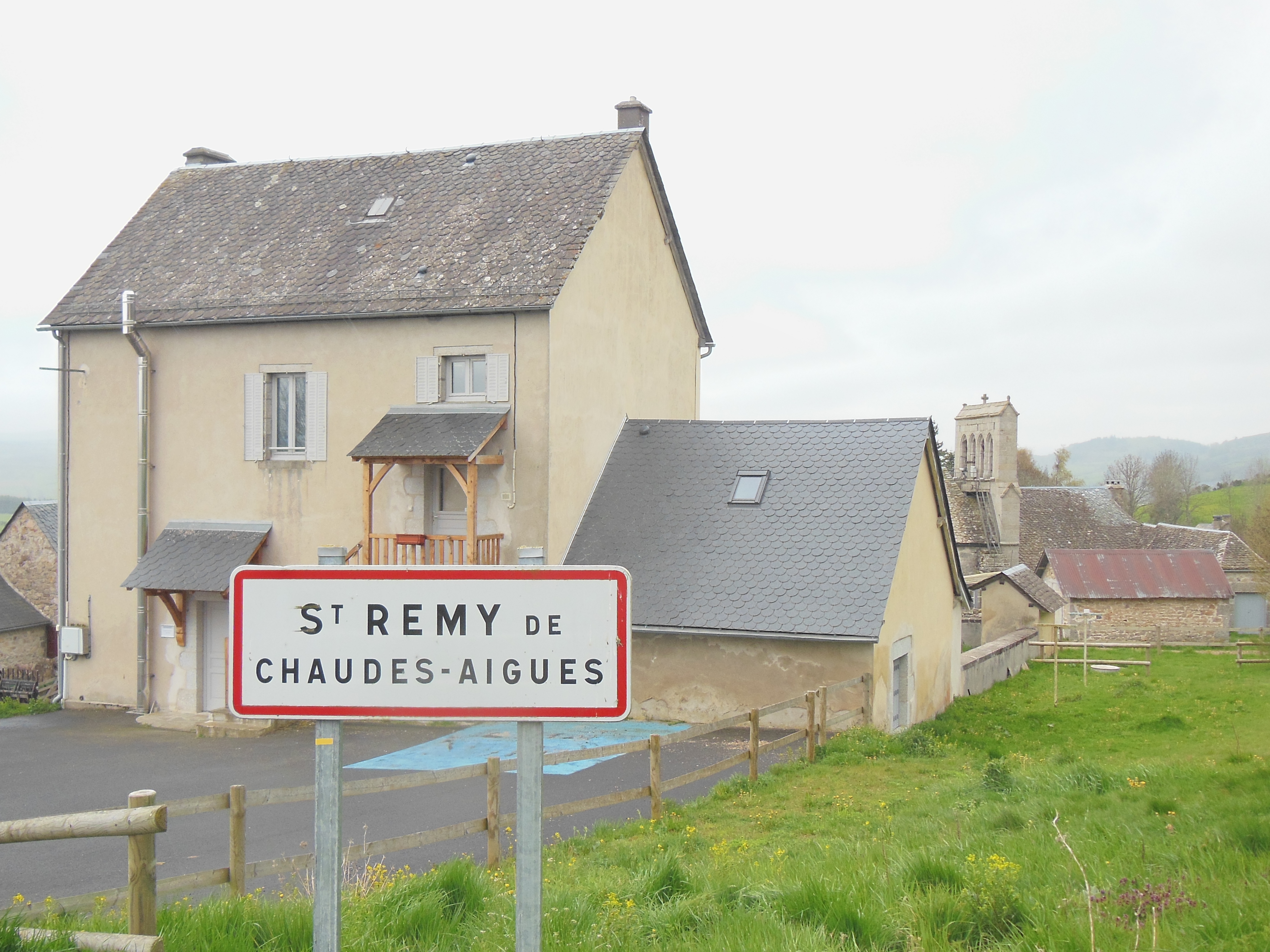
- Town hall
- Location of Saint-Rémy-de-Chaudes-Aigues
- Location within France Location within Auvergne-Rhône-Alpes
- Coordinates: 44°46′34″N 3°01′54″E
- Country: France
- Region: Auvergne-Rhône-Alpes
- Department: Cantal
- Arrondissement: Saint-Flour
- Canton: Neuvéglise-sur-Truyère
- Intercommunality: Saint-Flour Communauté

Government
  - Mayor (2020–2026): Vital Gendre
- Area^{1}: 14.87 km^{2} (5.74 sq mi)
- Elevation: 1,050 m (3,440 ft)
- Highest elevation: 1,282 m (4,206 ft)
- Lowest elevation: 951 m (3,120 ft)
- Population (2023): 120
  - Density: 8.1/km^{2} (21/sq mi)
- Time zone: UTC+01:00 (CET)
  - Summer (DST): UTC+02:00 (CEST)
- INSEE/Postal code: 15209 /15110
- ^{1} French Land Register data, which excludes lakes, ponds, glaciers > 1 km^{2} (0.386 sq mi or 247 acres) and river estuaries.

Saint-Rémy-de-Chaudes-Aigues (French pronunciation: [sɛ̃ ʁemi də ʃod.z‿ɛɡ], lit. "Saint-Rémy of Chaudes-Aigues"; Occitan: Sent Remise de Chaldas Aigas) is a commune in the Cantal department in the Auvergne-Rhône-Alpes region in south-central France.

== Demographics ==
Historical population
Year	Pop.	±% p.a.
1968	180	—
1975	153	−2.29%
1982	142	−1.06%
1990	132	−0.91%
1999	118	−1.24%
2007	121	+0.31%
2012	110	−1.89%
2017	119	+1.59%
2023	120	+0.14%
Source: INSEE

== See also ==
- Communes of the Cantal department
