= Chazelles, Cantal =

Commune in Auvergne-Rhône-Alpes, France

Chazelles
- Commune
- Location of Chazelles
- Location within France Location within Auvergne-Rhône-Alpes
- Coordinates: 45°06′16″N 3°20′14″E
- Country: France
- Region: Auvergne-Rhône-Alpes
- Department: Cantal
- Arrondissement: Saint-Flour
- Canton: Neuvéglise-sur-Truyère

Government
  - Mayor (2020–2026): Lucette Chauvel
- Area^{1}: 6.28 km^{2} (2.42 sq mi)
- Elevation: 976 m (3,202 ft)
- Highest elevation: 1,115 m (3,658 ft)
- Lowest elevation: 677 m (2,221 ft)
- Population (2023): 34
  - Density: 5.4/km^{2} (14/sq mi)
- Time zone: UTC+01:00 (CET)
  - Summer (DST): UTC+02:00 (CEST)
- INSEE/Postal code: 15048 /15500
- ^{1} French Land Register data, which excludes lakes, ponds, glaciers > 1 km^{2} (0.386 sq mi or 247 acres) and river estuaries.

Chazelles (French pronunciation: [ʃazɛl]; Occitan: Chasèlas) is a commune in the Cantal department in south-central France.

== Population ==
Historical population
Year	Pop.	±% p.a.
1968	80	—
1975	67	−2.50%
1982	56	−2.53%
1990	49	−1.66%
1999	45	−0.94%
2007	34	−3.44%
2012	41	+3.82%
2017	33	−4.25%
2023	34	+0.50%
Source: INSEE

== See also ==
- Communes of the Cantal department
