= Clavières =

Commune in Auvergne-Rhône-Alpes, France

- Commune
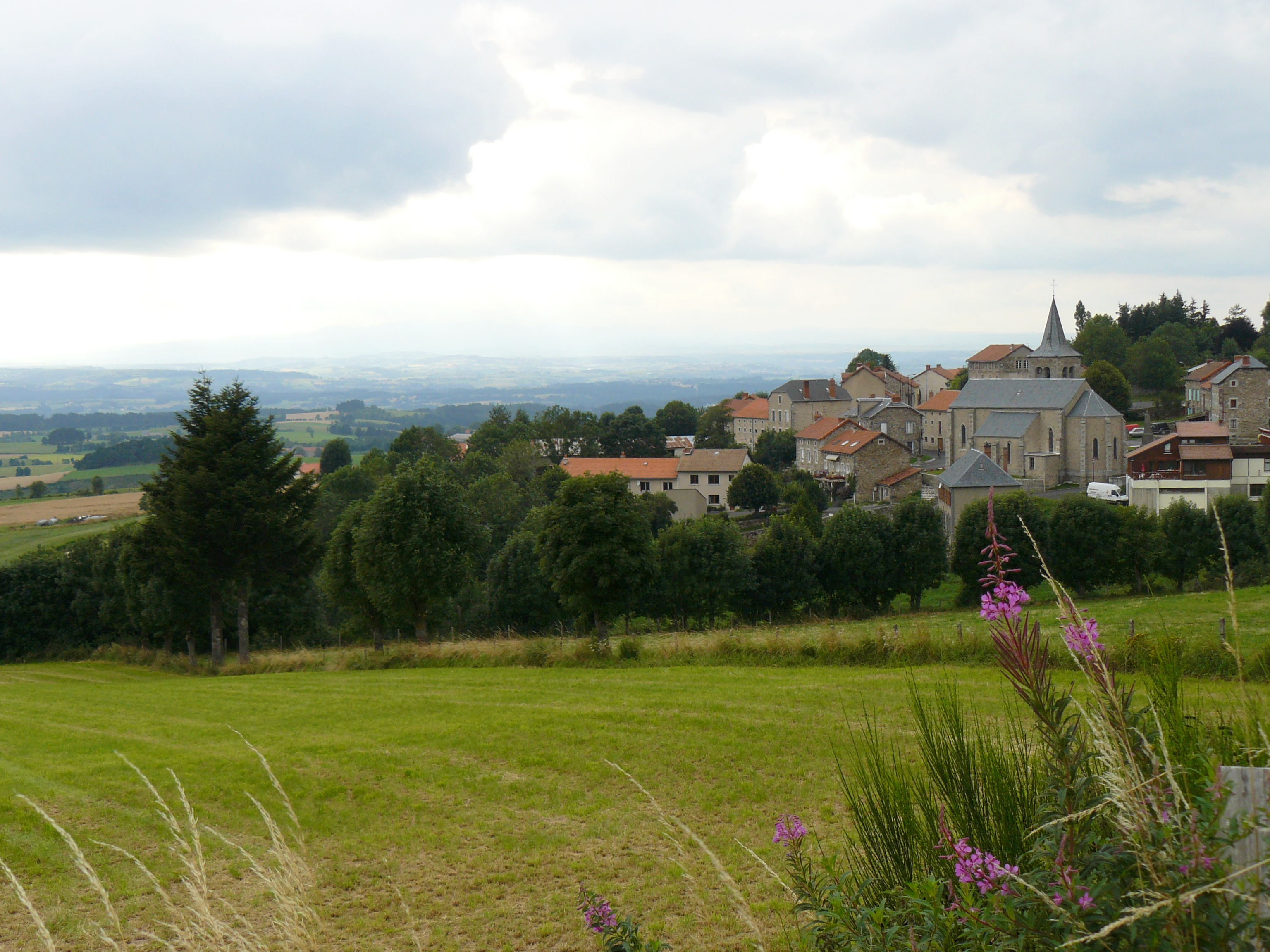
- A general view of Clavières

- Coat of arms
- Location of Clavières
- Location within France Location within Auvergne-Rhône-Alpes
- Coordinates: 44°59′12″N 3°16′39″E
- Country: France
- Region: Auvergne-Rhône-Alpes
- Department: Cantal
- Arrondissement: Saint-Flour
- Canton: Neuvéglise-sur-Truyère
- Intercommunality: Saint-Flour Communauté

Government
  - Mayor (2020–2026): Gilles Bigot
- Area^{1}: 44.66 km^{2} (17.24 sq mi)
- Elevation: 1,060 m (3,480 ft)
- Highest elevation: 1,434 m (4,705 ft)
- Lowest elevation: 872 m (2,861 ft)
- Population (2023): 184
  - Density: 4.12/km^{2} (10.7/sq mi)
- Time zone: UTC+01:00 (CET)
  - Summer (DST): UTC+02:00 (CEST)
- INSEE/Postal code: 15051 /15320
- ^{1} French Land Register data, which excludes lakes, ponds, glaciers > 1 km^{2} (0.386 sq mi or 247 acres) and river estuaries.

Clavières (French pronunciation: [klavjɛʁ]; Occitan: Clavèiras) is a commune in the Cantal department in south-central France.

== Population ==
Historical population
Year	Pop.	±% p.a.
1968	477	—
1975	433	−1.37%
1982	337	−3.52%
1990	308	−1.12%
1999	265	−1.66%
2007	242	−1.13%
2012	223	−1.62%
2017	209	−1.29%
2023	184	−2.10%
Source: INSEE

== See also ==
- Communes of the Cantal department
