= Chaliers =

Commune in Auvergne-Rhône-Alpes, France

- Commune
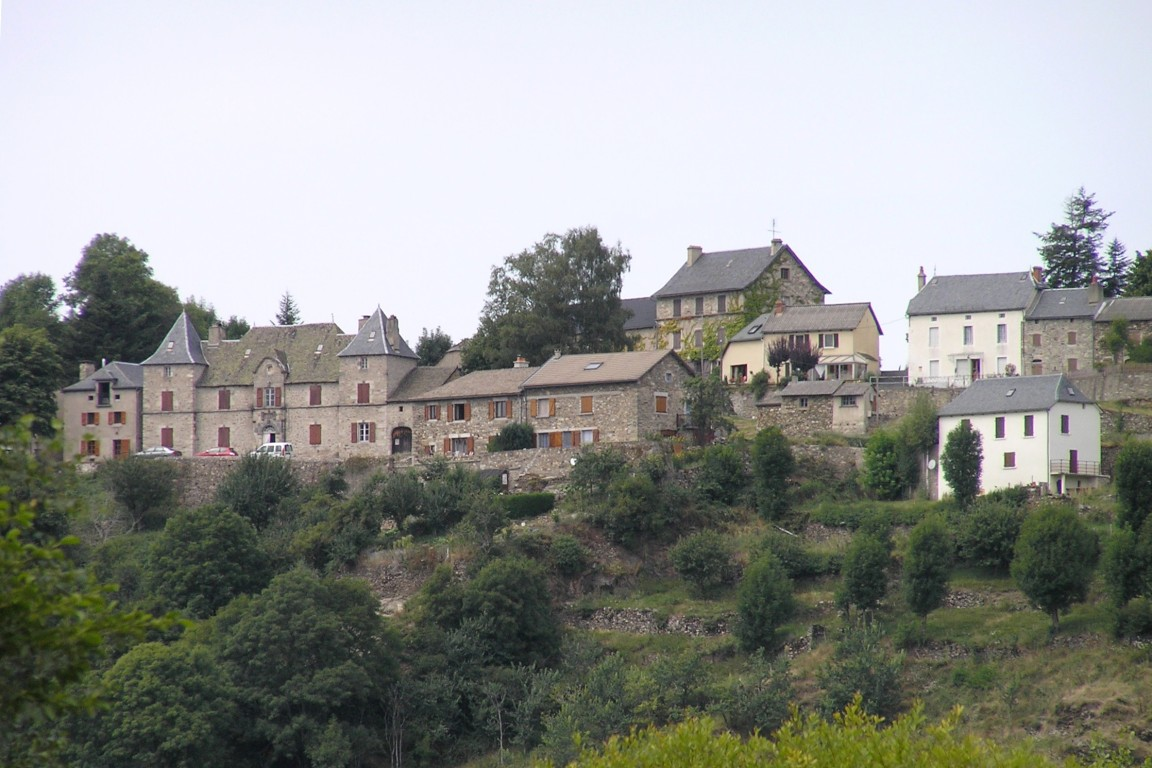
- A general view of Chaliers
- Location of Chaliers
- Location within France Location within Auvergne-Rhône-Alpes
- Coordinates: 44°57′27″N 3°13′43″E
- Country: France
- Region: Auvergne-Rhône-Alpes
- Department: Cantal
- Arrondissement: Saint-Flour
- Canton: Neuvéglise-sur-Truyère

Government
  - Mayor (2020–2026): Bernadette Resche
- Area^{1}: 18.37 km^{2} (7.09 sq mi)
- Elevation: 835 m (2,740 ft)
- Highest elevation: 1,002 m (3,287 ft)
- Lowest elevation: 728 m (2,388 ft)
- Population (2023): 139
  - Density: 7.57/km^{2} (19.6/sq mi)
- Time zone: UTC+01:00 (CET)
  - Summer (DST): UTC+02:00 (CEST)
- INSEE/Postal code: 15034 /15320
- ^{1} French Land Register data, which excludes lakes, ponds, glaciers > 1 km^{2} (0.386 sq mi or 247 acres) and river estuaries.

Chaliers (French pronunciation: [ʃalje]; Occitan: Chalalher) is a commune in the Cantal department in south-central France.

== Population ==
Historical population
Year	Pop.	±% p.a.
1968	236	—
1975	218	−1.13%
1982	214	−0.26%
1990	227	+0.74%
1999	196	−1.62%
2007	182	−0.92%
2012	190	+0.86%
2017	160	−3.38%
2023	139	−2.32%
Source: INSEE

== See also ==
- Communes of the Cantal department
