= Narnhac =

Commune in Auvergne-Rhône-Alpes, France

- Commune
- Location of Narnhac
- Location within France Location within Auvergne-Rhône-Alpes
- Coordinates: 44°55′46″N 2°46′47″E
- Country: France
- Region: Auvergne-Rhône-Alpes
- Department: Cantal
- Arrondissement: Saint-Flour
- Canton: Saint-Flour-2

Government
  - Mayor (2020–2026): Jean Mezange
- Area^{1}: 10.29 km^{2} (3.97 sq mi)
- Elevation: 1,000 m (3,300 ft)
- Highest elevation: 1,110 m (3,640 ft)
- Lowest elevation: 756 m (2,480 ft)
- Population (2023): 69
  - Density: 6.7/km^{2} (17/sq mi)
- Time zone: UTC+01:00 (CET)
  - Summer (DST): UTC+02:00 (CEST)
- INSEE/Postal code: 15139 /15230
- ^{1} French Land Register data, which excludes lakes, ponds, glaciers > 1 km^{2} (0.386 sq mi or 247 acres) and river estuaries.

Narnhac is a commune in the Cantal department in south-central France.

== Population ==
Historical population
Year	Pop.	±% p.a.
1968	184	—
1975	138	−4.03%
1982	128	−1.07%
1990	118	−1.01%
1999	84	−3.71%
2007	81	−0.45%
2012	74	−1.79%
2017	72	−0.55%
2023	69	−0.71%
Source: INSEE

== See also ==
- Communes of the Cantal department
