= Anterrieux =

Commune in Auvergne-Rhône-Alpes, France

- Commune
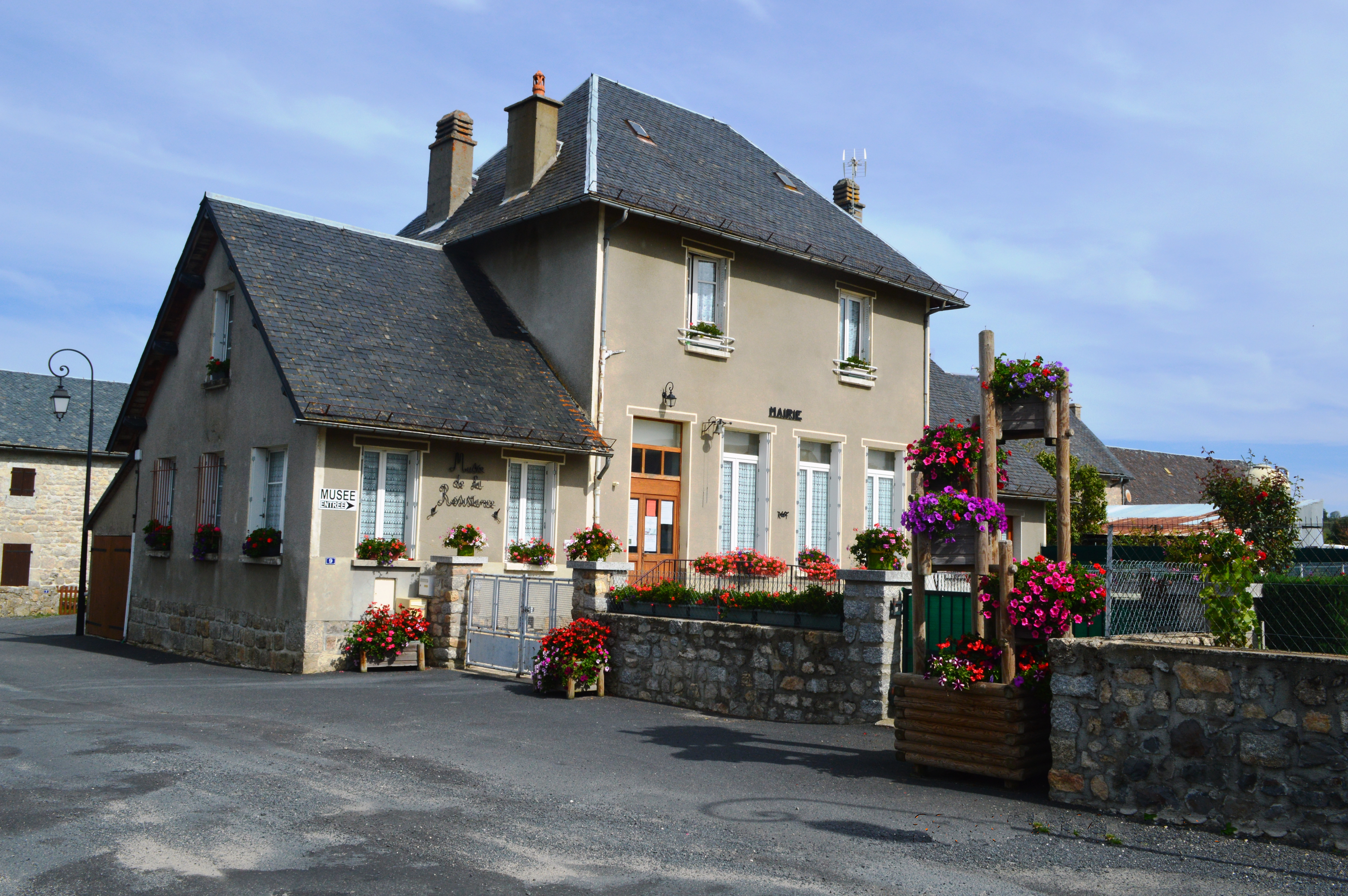
- The Town Hall and Museum
- Location of Anterrieux
- Location within France Location within Auvergne-Rhône-Alpes
- Coordinates: 44°50′11″N 3°02′40″E
- Country: France
- Region: Auvergne-Rhône-Alpes
- Department: Cantal
- Arrondissement: Saint-Flour
- Canton: Neuvéglise-sur-Truyère
- Intercommunality: Saint-Flour Communauté

Government
  - Mayor (2020–2026): Marcel Chastang
- Area^{1}: 16.16 km^{2} (6.24 sq mi)
- Elevation: 960 m (3,150 ft)
- Highest elevation: 1,132 m (3,714 ft)
- Lowest elevation: 862 m (2,828 ft)
- Population (2023): 122
  - Density: 7.55/km^{2} (19.6/sq mi)
- Time zone: UTC+01:00 (CET)
  - Summer (DST): UTC+02:00 (CEST)
- INSEE/Postal code: 15007 /15110
- ^{1} French Land Register data, which excludes lakes, ponds, glaciers > 1 km^{2} (0.386 sq mi or 247 acres) and river estuaries.

Anterrieux (French pronunciation: [ɑ̃tɛʁjø]; Occitan: Antarrius) is a commune in the Cantal department in the Auvergne region of southern central France.

== Geography ==
Anterrieux is located some 30 km south by south-west of Saint-Flour and 20 km west by north-west of Saint-Chely-d'Apcher. Access to the commune is by road D989 from Saint-Chely-d'Apcher in the east passing through the commune and continuing west to Chaudes-Aigues. Access to the village is by small communal roads from various points on the D989. In addition to the village there is also the hamlet of Oyex in the south. The commune is mixed forest and farmland with an especially large forest (the Bois d'Oyex) in the far south of the commune.

The Bes river forms the south-eastern border of the commune as it flows north to join La Truyere river in the Lac de Grandval. The Maleval river rises in the commune and flows north past the village. It is joined by several tributaries in the commune.

== History ==
The region was the scene of fighting in June 1944 between the Maquis and Nazi troops. The Nazis were successful in overrunning the Maquis in their Truyère Redoubt where they were attacked on 20 June 1944. The battle was fierce and the village of Anterrieux was destroyed by fire after having been held for ten hours by the 3,000 resistance fighters of the 7th Company under the command of Henri Fournier who were forced to disperse because of the German firepower supported by their air force. More than a hundred maquisards were killed as well as about fifteen German soldiers and a dozen civilians. The Resistance Museum of Anterrieux provides the public with memories of that time.

See: John Hind Farmer

== Administration ==
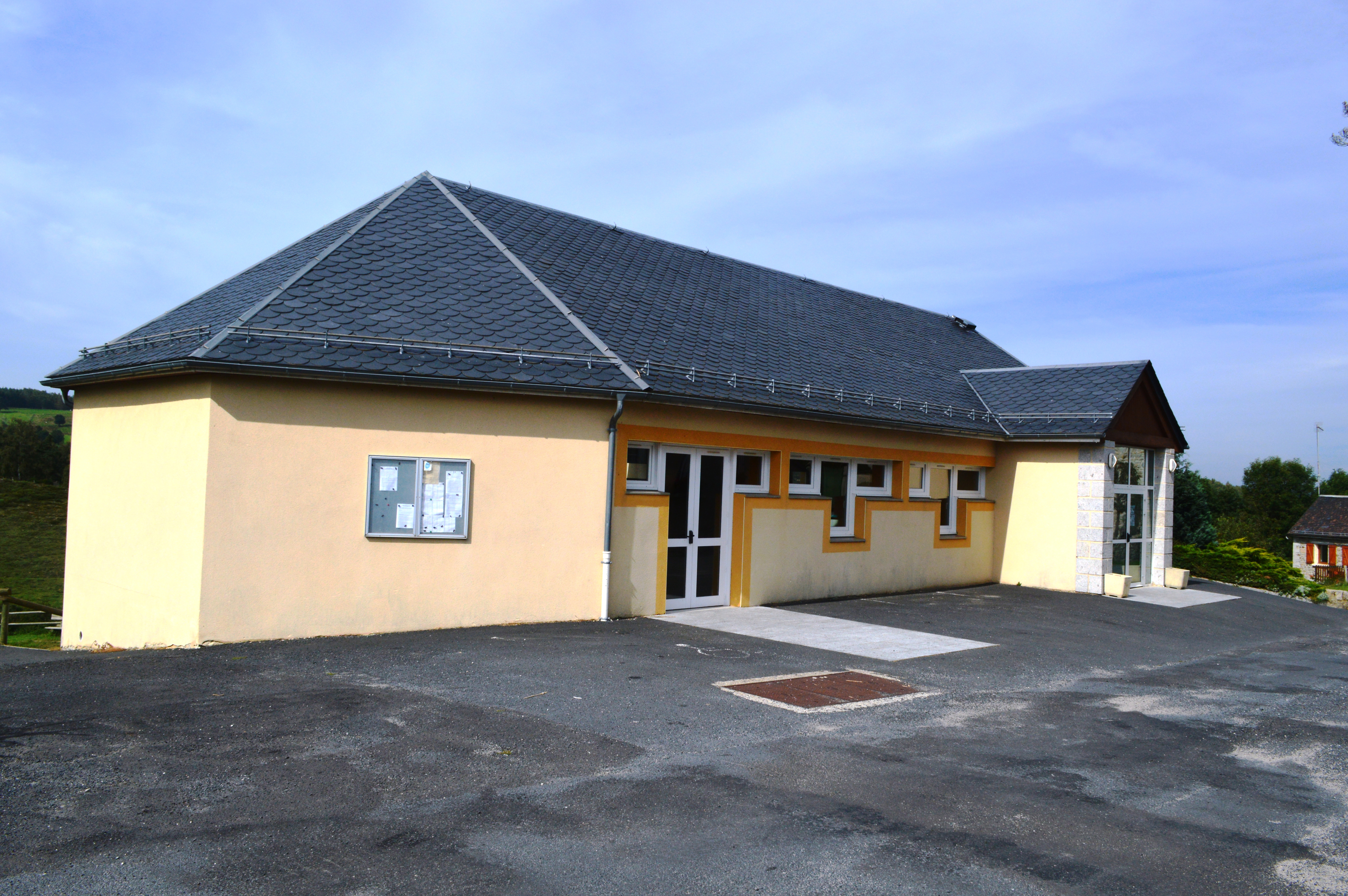
Anterrieux Community Hall

List of Successive Mayors

From	To	Name	Party
2001	2020	Louis Raynal	DVD
2020	2026	Marcel Chastang	

== Population ==
Historical population
Year	Pop.	±% p.a.
1968	132	—
1975	141	+0.95%
1982	112	−3.24%
1990	124	+1.28%
1999	130	+0.53%
2007	130	+0.00%
2012	126	−0.62%
2017	123	−0.48%
2023	122	−0.14%
Source: INSEE

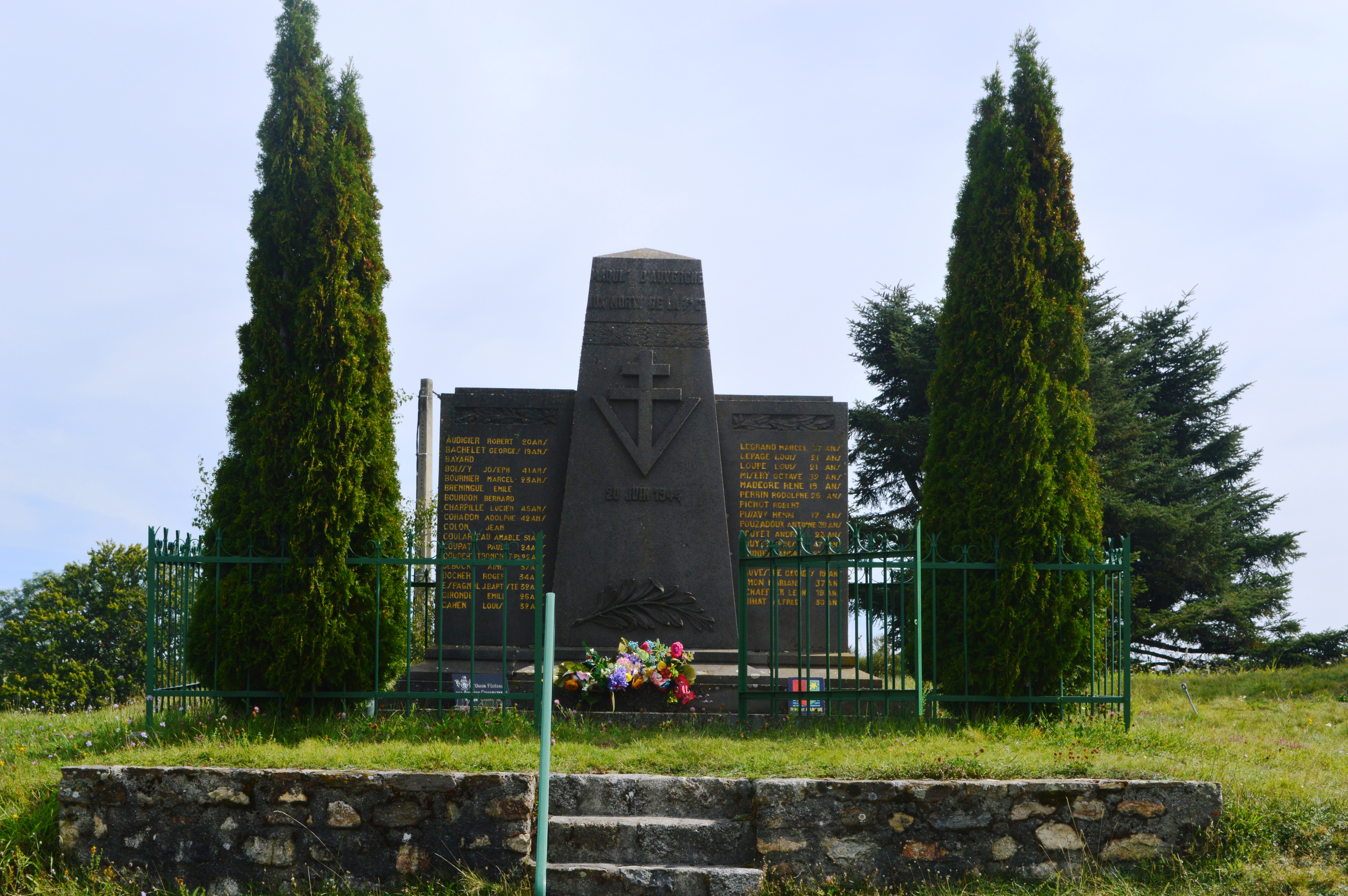
Anterrieux War Memorial

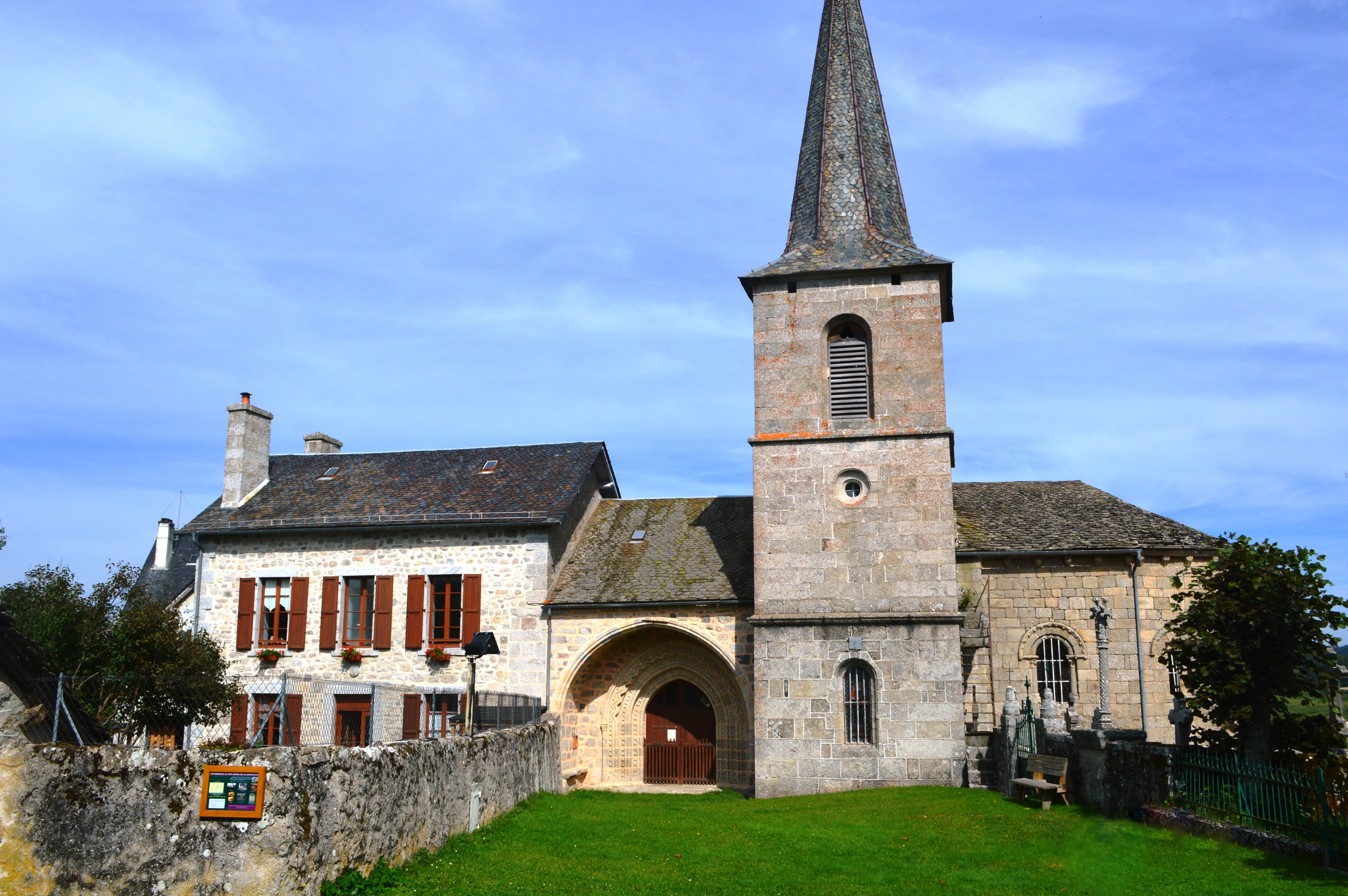
Anterrieux Church

== See also ==
- Communes of the Cantal department
