= Soulage =

Soulage is a surname. Notable people with the surname include:

- Bernard Soulage (born 1948), French politician
- Daniel Soulage (1942–2020), French politician
- Marcelle Soulage (1894–1970), French pianist, music critic and composer

== See also ==
- Soulages (disambiguation)
- Solage
