= Molèdes =

Commune in Auvergne-Rhône-Alpes, France

- Commune
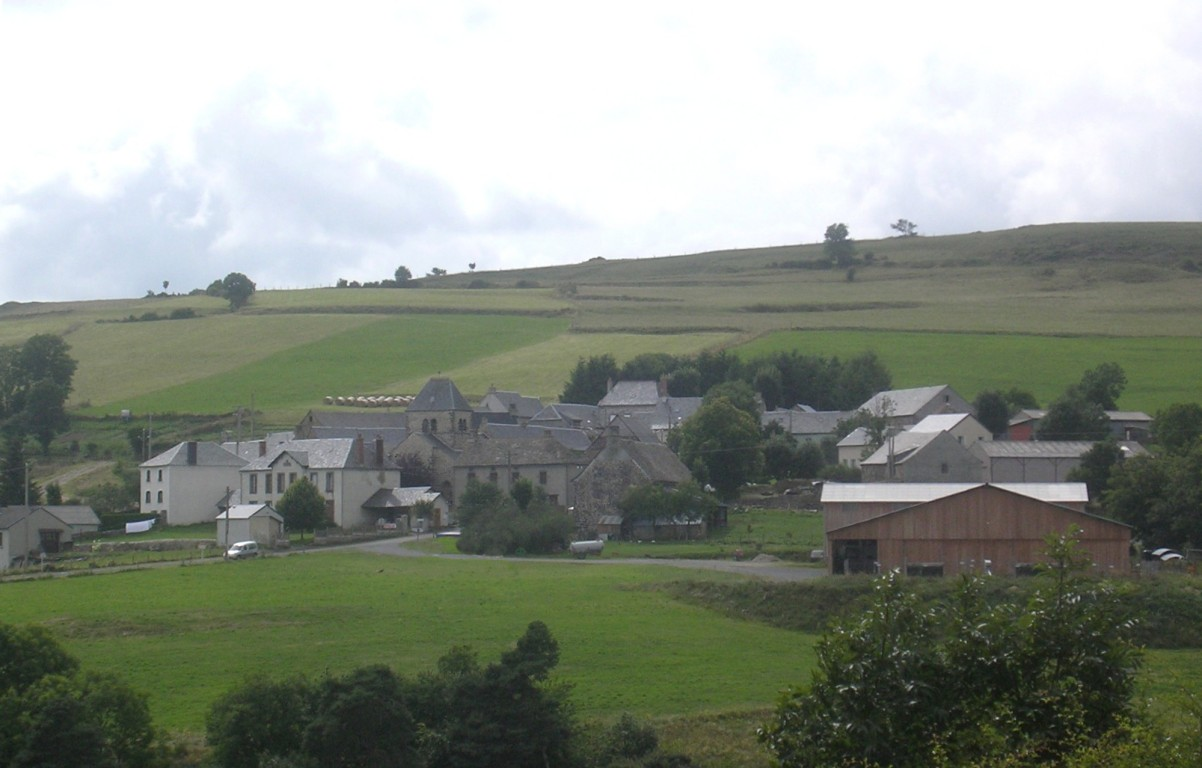
- A general view of Molèdes
- Location of Molèdes
- Location within France Location within Auvergne-Rhône-Alpes
- Coordinates: 45°15′48″N 3°02′26″E
- Country: France
- Region: Auvergne-Rhône-Alpes
- Department: Cantal
- Arrondissement: Saint-Flour
- Canton: Saint-Flour-1

Government
  - Mayor (2020–2026): Jean-François Landes
- Area^{1}: 22.38 km^{2} (8.64 sq mi)
- Elevation: 1,050 m (3,440 ft)
- Highest elevation: 1,284 m (4,213 ft)
- Lowest elevation: 661 m (2,169 ft)
- Population (2023): 77
  - Density: 3.4/km^{2} (8.9/sq mi)
- Time zone: UTC+01:00 (CET)
  - Summer (DST): UTC+02:00 (CEST)
- INSEE/Postal code: 15126 /15500
- ^{1} French Land Register data, which excludes lakes, ponds, glaciers > 1 km^{2} (0.386 sq mi or 247 acres) and river estuaries.

Molèdes (French pronunciation: [mɔlɛd]; Occitan: Moledas) is a commune in the Cantal department in south-central France.

== Population ==
Historical population
Year	Pop.	±% p.a.
1968	218	—
1975	198	−1.37%
1982	181	−1.27%
1990	140	−3.16%
1999	115	−2.16%
2007	101	−1.61%
2012	97	−0.80%
2017	92	−1.05%
2023	77	−2.92%
Source: INSEE

== See also ==
- Communes of the Cantal department
