= Soulages, Cantal =

Commune in Auvergne-Rhône-Alpes, France

Soulages
- Commune
- Location of Soulages
- Location within France Location within Auvergne-Rhône-Alpes
- Coordinates: 45°05′23″N 3°16′28″E
- Country: France
- Region: Auvergne-Rhône-Alpes
- Department: Cantal
- Arrondissement: Saint-Flour
- Canton: Neuvéglise-sur-Truyère
- Intercommunality: Saint-Flour Communauté

Government
  - Mayor (2020–2026): Olivier Reversat
- Area^{1}: 15.09 km^{2} (5.83 sq mi)
- Elevation: 960 m (3,150 ft)
- Highest elevation: 1,118 m (3,668 ft)
- Lowest elevation: 840 m (2,760 ft)
- Population (2023): 84
  - Density: 5.6/km^{2} (14/sq mi)
- Time zone: UTC+01:00 (CET)
  - Summer (DST): UTC+02:00 (CEST)
- INSEE/Postal code: 15229 /15100
- ^{1} French Land Register data, which excludes lakes, ponds, glaciers > 1 km^{2} (0.386 sq mi or 247 acres) and river estuaries.

Soulages (French pronunciation: [sulaʒ]; Occitan: Solatge) is a commune in the Cantal department in south-central France.

== Population ==
Historical population
Year	Pop.	±% p.a.
1968	182	—
1975	151	−2.63%
1982	129	−2.22%
1990	107	−2.31%
1999	101	−0.64%
2007	79	−3.02%
2012	88	+2.18%
2017	80	−1.89%
2023	84	+0.82%
Source: INSEE

== See also ==
- Communes of the Cantal department
