= Vabres, Cantal =

Commune in Auvergne-Rhône-Alpes, France

Vabres
- Commune
- Location of Vabres
- Location within France Location within Auvergne-Rhône-Alpes
- Coordinates: 45°02′09″N 3°12′27″E
- Country: France
- Region: Auvergne-Rhône-Alpes
- Department: Cantal
- Arrondissement: Saint-Flour
- Canton: Neuvéglise-sur-Truyère
- Intercommunality: Saint-Flour Communauté

Government
  - Mayor (2020–2026): Bernard Jean
- Area^{1}: 18.83 km^{2} (7.27 sq mi)
- Elevation: 934 m (3,064 ft)
- Highest elevation: 1,143 m (3,750 ft)
- Lowest elevation: 814 m (2,671 ft)
- Population (2023): 244
  - Density: 13.0/km^{2} (33.6/sq mi)
- Time zone: UTC+01:00 (CET)
  - Summer (DST): UTC+02:00 (CEST)
- INSEE/Postal code: 15245 /15100
- ^{1} French Land Register data, which excludes lakes, ponds, glaciers > 1 km^{2} (0.386 sq mi or 247 acres) and river estuaries.

Vabres (French pronunciation: [vabʁ]) is a commune in the Cantal department in south-central France.

== Population ==
Historical population
Year	Pop.	±% p.a.
1968	283	—
1975	247	−1.92%
1982	245	−0.12%
1990	242	−0.15%
1999	253	+0.50%
2007	223	−1.57%
2012	230	+0.62%
2017	250	+1.68%
2023	244	−0.40%
Source: INSEE

== See also ==
- Communes of the Cantal department
