= Saint-Martial, Cantal =

Commune in Auvergne-Rhône-Alpes, France

Saint-Martial
- Commune
- Location of Saint-Martial
- Location within France Location within Auvergne-Rhône-Alpes
- Coordinates: 44°52′25″N 3°02′46″E
- Country: France
- Region: Auvergne-Rhône-Alpes
- Department: Cantal
- Arrondissement: Saint-Flour
- Canton: Neuvéglise-sur-Truyère

Government
  - Mayor (2020–2026): Claude Bonnefoi
- Area^{1}: 14.19 km^{2} (5.48 sq mi)
- Elevation: 900 m (3,000 ft)
- Highest elevation: 1,029 m (3,376 ft)
- Lowest elevation: 659 m (2,162 ft)
- Population (2023): 71
  - Density: 5.0/km^{2} (13/sq mi)
- Time zone: UTC+01:00 (CET)
  - Summer (DST): UTC+02:00 (CEST)
- INSEE/Postal code: 15199 /15110
- ^{1} French Land Register data, which excludes lakes, ponds, glaciers > 1 km^{2} (0.386 sq mi or 247 acres) and river estuaries.

Saint-Martial (French pronunciation: [sɛ̃ maʁsjal]; Occitan: Sant Marçal) is a commune in the Cantal department in south-central France.

== Population ==
Historical population
Year	Pop.	±% p.a.
1968	124	—
1975	96	−3.59%
1982	83	−2.06%
1990	78	−0.77%
1999	78	+0.00%
2007	80	+0.32%
2012	64	−4.36%
2017	81	+4.82%
2023	71	−2.17%
Source: INSEE

== See also ==
- Communes of the Cantal department
