= Alleuze =

Commune in Auvergne-Rhône-Alpes, France

- Commune
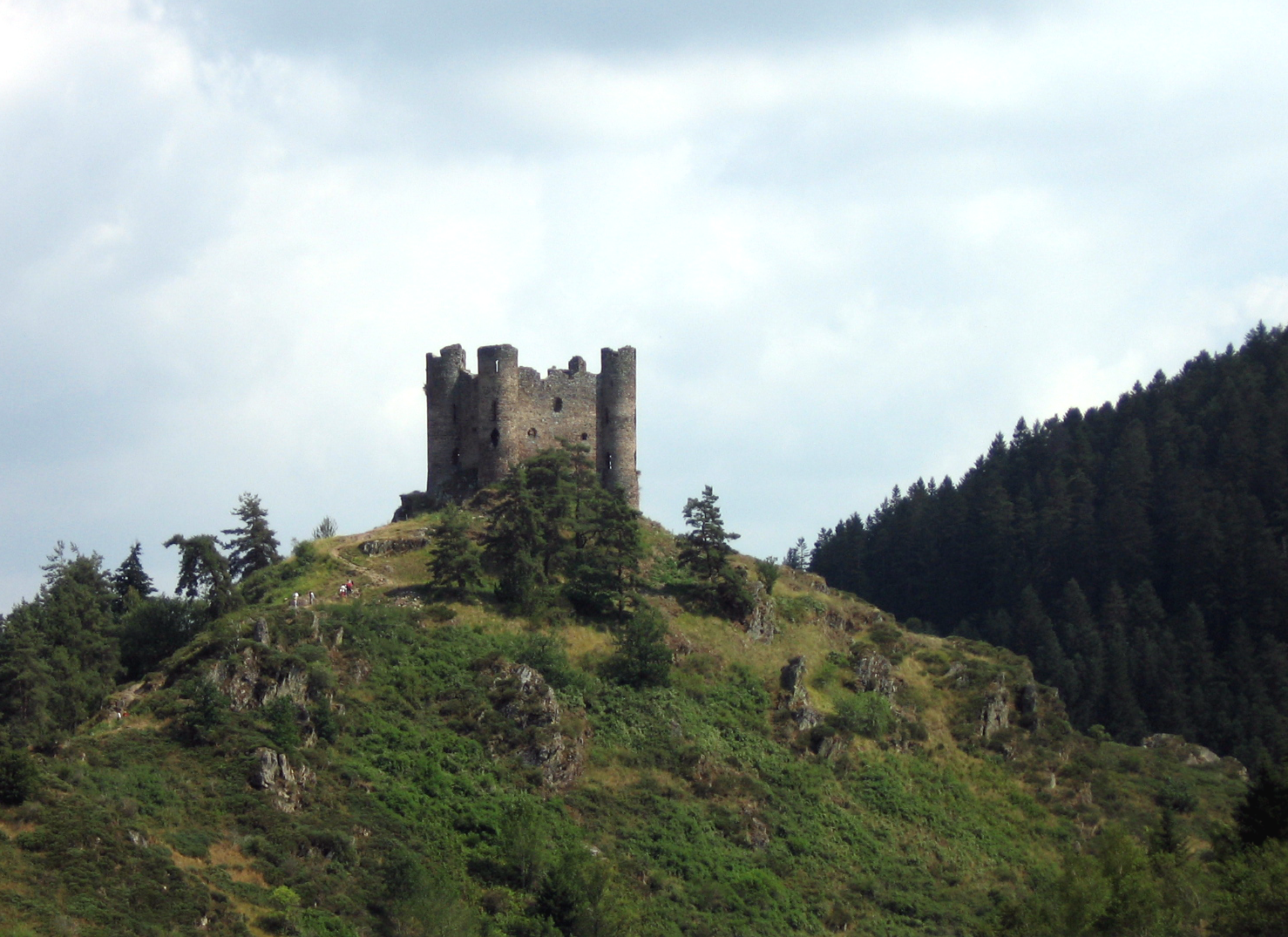
- The Château d'Alleuze
- Location of Alleuze
- Location within France Location within Auvergne-Rhône-Alpes
- Coordinates: 44°57′47″N 3°05′11″E
- Country: France
- Region: Auvergne-Rhône-Alpes
- Department: Cantal
- Arrondissement: Saint-Flour
- Canton: Neuvéglise-sur-Truyère
- Intercommunality: Saint-Flour Communauté

Government
  - Mayor (2020–2026): Michel Rouffiac
- Area^{1}: 22.85 km^{2} (8.82 sq mi)
- Elevation: 870 m (2,850 ft)
- Highest elevation: 1,004 m (3,294 ft)
- Lowest elevation: 740 m (2,430 ft)
- Population (2023): 224
  - Density: 9.80/km^{2} (25.4/sq mi)
- Time zone: UTC+01:00 (CET)
  - Summer (DST): UTC+02:00 (CEST)
- INSEE/Postal code: 15002 /15100
- ^{1} French Land Register data, which excludes lakes, ponds, glaciers > 1 km^{2} (0.386 sq mi or 247 acres) and river estuaries.

Alleuze (French pronunciation: [aløz]; Occitan: Alueisa) is a commune in the Cantal department in the Auvergne region of south-central France.

== Geography ==
Alleuze is located some 7 km due south of Saint-Flour on the edge of the Planèze plateau. Access to the commune is by a number of minor roads including the D48 from Lavastrie in the west changing to the D40 in the commune then passing north through a circuitous route in the heart of the commune to the village and continuing north-west to the hamlet of Barry before continuing north to Saint-Flour. There is also the D116 from the village to the north-west. The eastern and north-eastern borders of the commune consist of the lake formed by the Barrage of Grandval which was formed from the Truyère river. Apart from the village there are also the hamlets of Barry and Vedrines. Much of the commune is farmland but with considerable forests next to the lake and in the south.

Numerous streams rise in the commune and flow eastwards to the Barrage of Grandval Lake. These include the Ruisseau de Larcher, the Alleuze, the Ruisseau de la Bastide, the Ruissseau de la Barge, the Ruisseau de Labaisse, the Ruisseau de Mouguenoux, the Ruyisseau de Sartio, and the Ruisseau de Levert.

== Administration ==
List of Successive Mayors

From	To	Name	Party
2001	2026	Michel Rouffiac	UDI

== Population ==
Historical population
Year	Pop.	±% p.a.
1968	281	—
1975	259	−1.16%
1982	240	−1.08%
1990	219	−1.14%
1999	193	−1.39%
2007	206	+0.82%
2012	208	+0.19%
2017	216	+0.76%
2023	224	+0.61%
Source: INSEE

== Culture and heritage ==
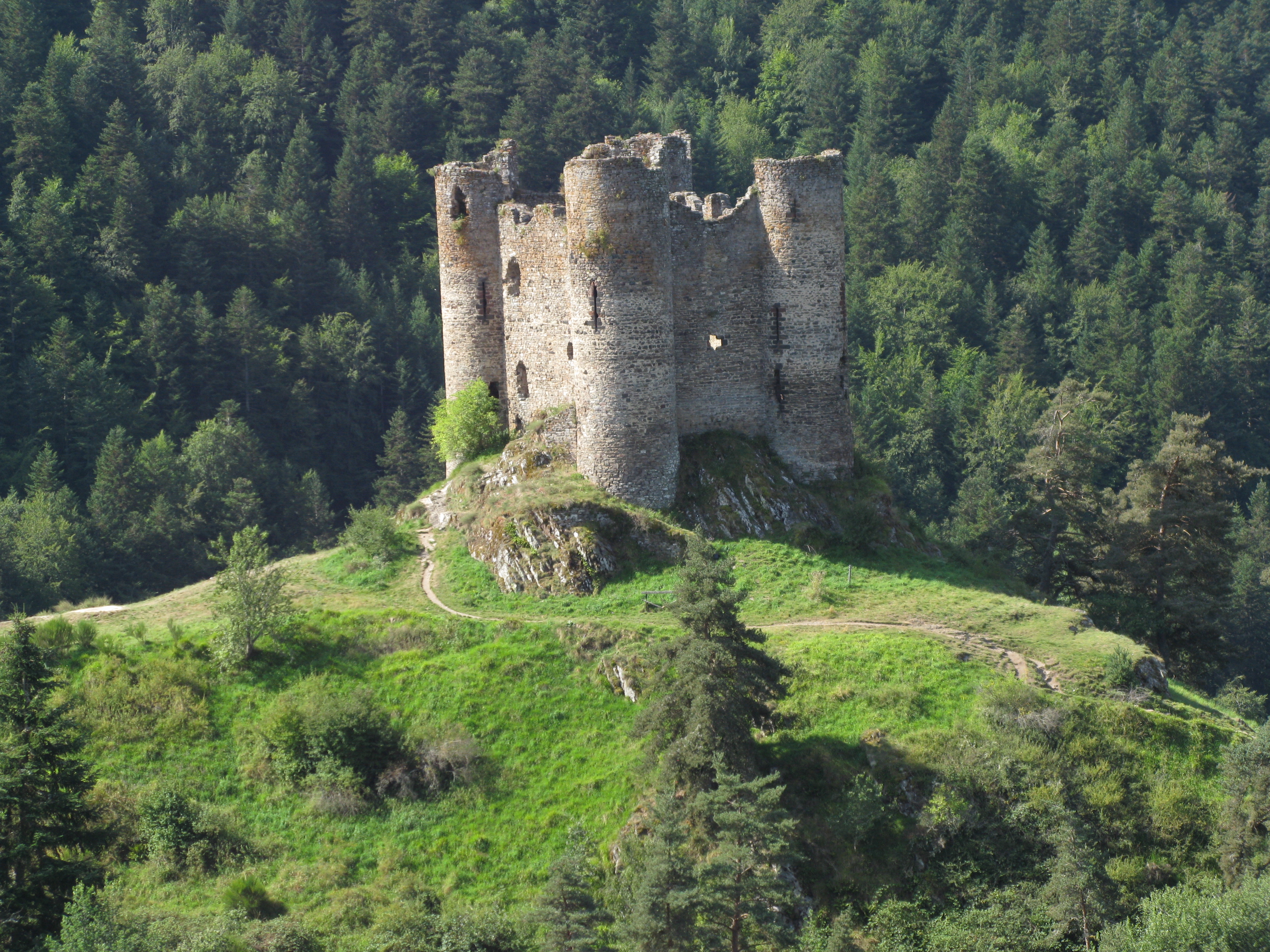
Château d'Alleuze

=== Civil heritage ===
- The Remains of a fortified Chateau (1411) are registered as an historical monument. It overlooks the gorges of the Truyère river.

Other sites of interest

- Filming locations for the films L'Extraterrestre by Didier Bourdon and La Grande Vadrouille (The Great Stroll).

=== Religious heritage ===
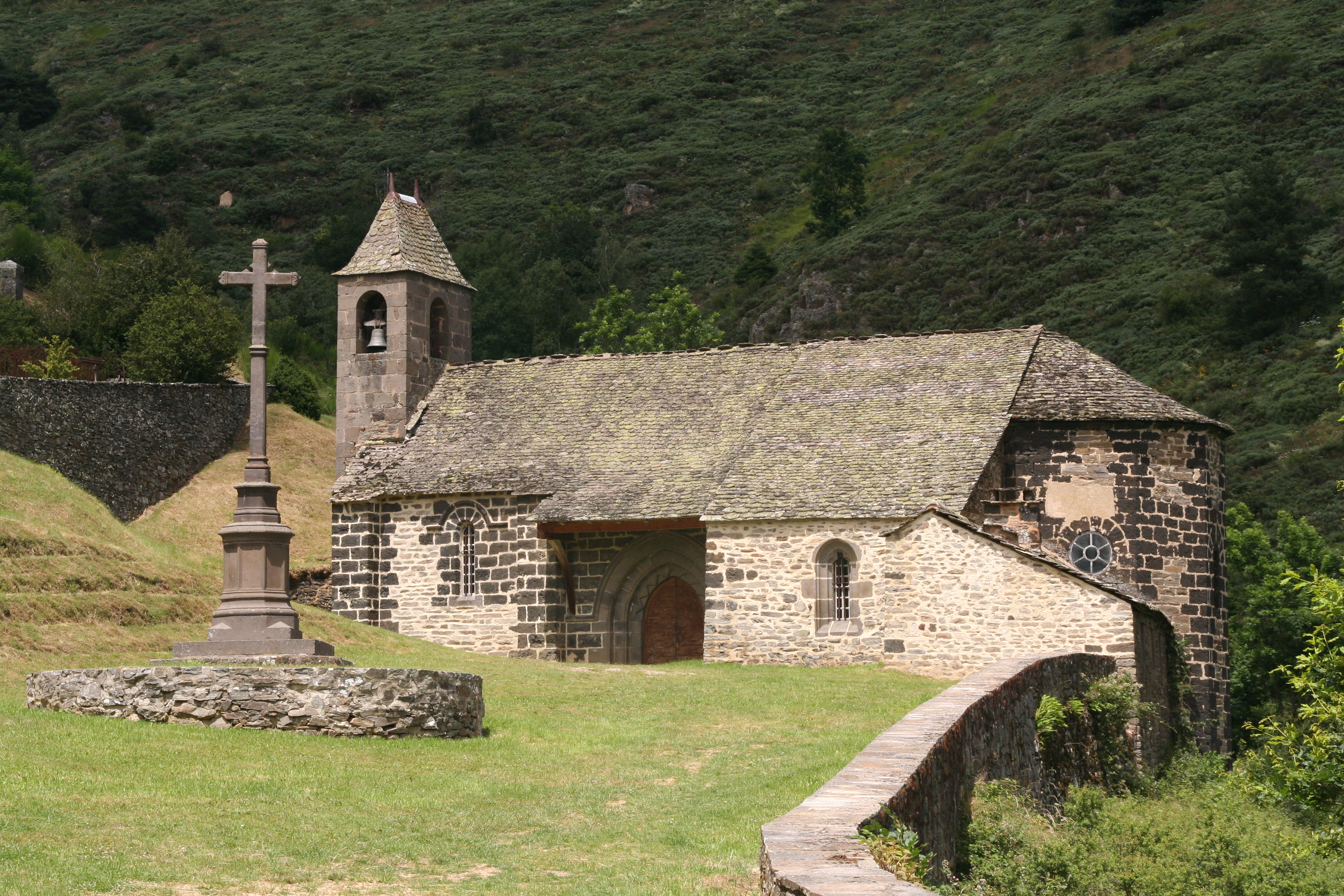
Chapel of Saint-Illide

The commune has two religious sites that are registered as historical monuments:

- A Wayside Cross (15th century)
- The Church of Saint Illide (12th century)

== See also ==
- Lac de Grandval
