= Barrage de Grandval =

Grandval Dam
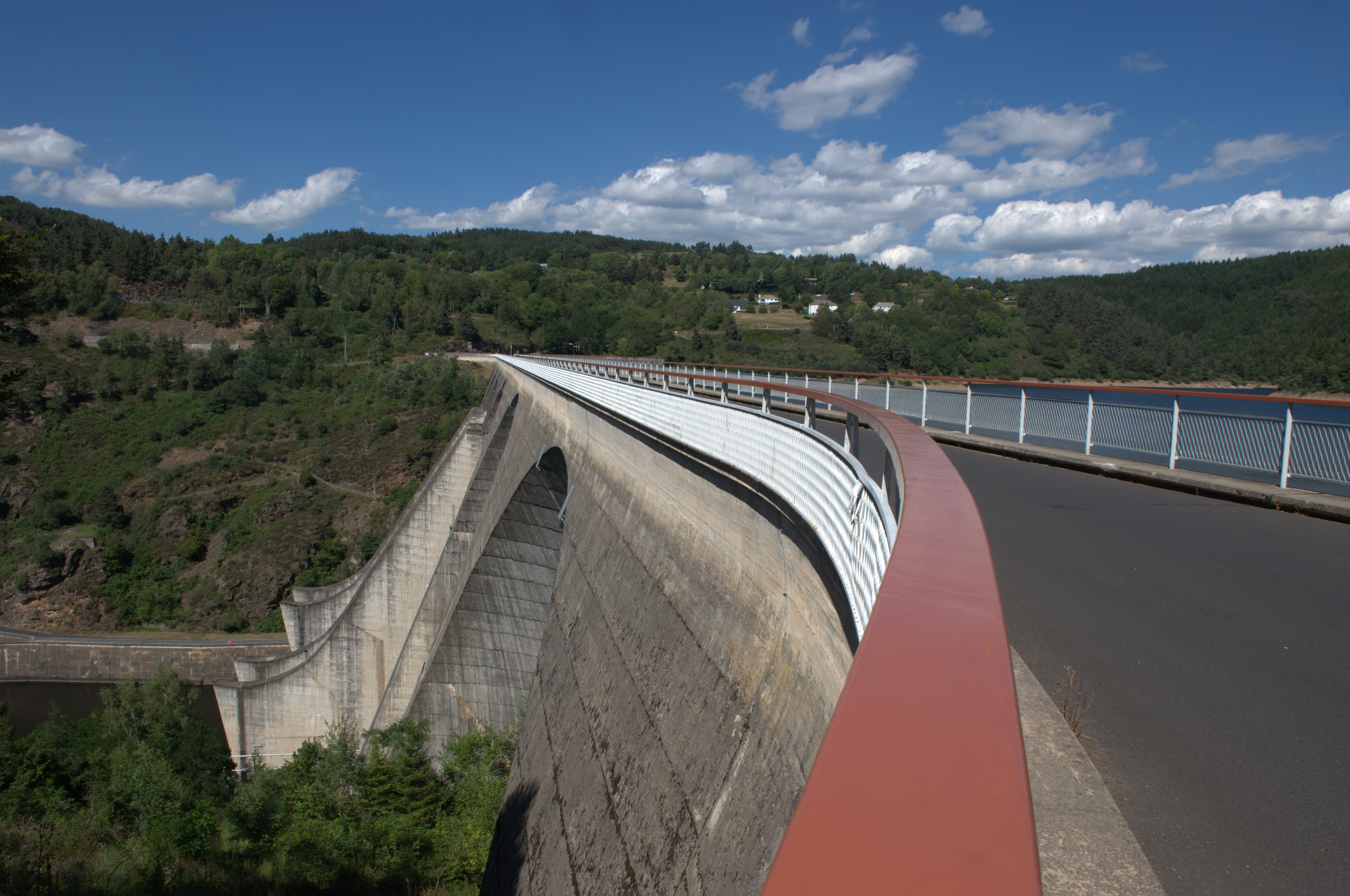
- Interactive map of Grandval Dam
- Official name: Barrage de Grandval
- Country: France
- Location: Lavastrie
- Coordinates: 44°55′20.5″N 3°04′28.8″E
- Construction began: 1955
- Opening date: 1960

Dam and spillways
- Height (foundation): 88m
- Height (thalweg): 76m
- Length: 376 m (1,234 ft)
- Dam volume: 271m3

The Grandval Dam (French: barrage de Grandval, French pronunciation: [baʁaʒ də ɡʁɑ̃val]; Occitan: barratge de Grandval) is a dam in the French region Massif central, which opened in 1960. It was conceived by architects Henri et Louis Marty. It is located on the Truyère river, in the departement of Cantal, in between the communes of Fridefont et de Lavastrie.
