= Faverolles =

Faverolles may refer to several communes in France:

- Faverolles, Aisne, in the Aisne département
- Faverolles, Cantal, in the Cantal département
- Faverolles, Eure-et-Loir, in the Eure-et-Loir département
- Faverolles, Indre, in the Indre département
- Faverolles, Haute-Marne, in the Haute-Marne département
- Faverolles, Orne, in the Orne département
- Faverolles, Somme, in the Somme département
- Faverolles-et-Coëmy, in the Marne département
- Faverolles-la-Campagne, in the Eure département
- Faverolles-lès-Lucey, in the Côte-d'Or département
- Faverolles-sur-Cher, in the Loir-et-Cher département
- Faverolles-les-Mares, a former commune that is now Bournainville-Faverolles in the Eure département

== Other ==
- Faverolles (chicken), a breed of chicken
