= Oradour =

Oradour is the name or part of the name of several communes in France:

- Oradour-sur-Glane, in the Haute-Vienne département, destroyed along with almost all of its inhabitants by the Nazis
  - Oradour-sur-Glane massacre
- Oradour, Cantal
- Oradour, Charente
- Oradour-Fanais, in the Charente département
- Oradour-Saint-Genest, in the Haute-Vienne département
- Oradour-sur-Vayres, in the Haute-Vienne département
