= Lac de Grandval =

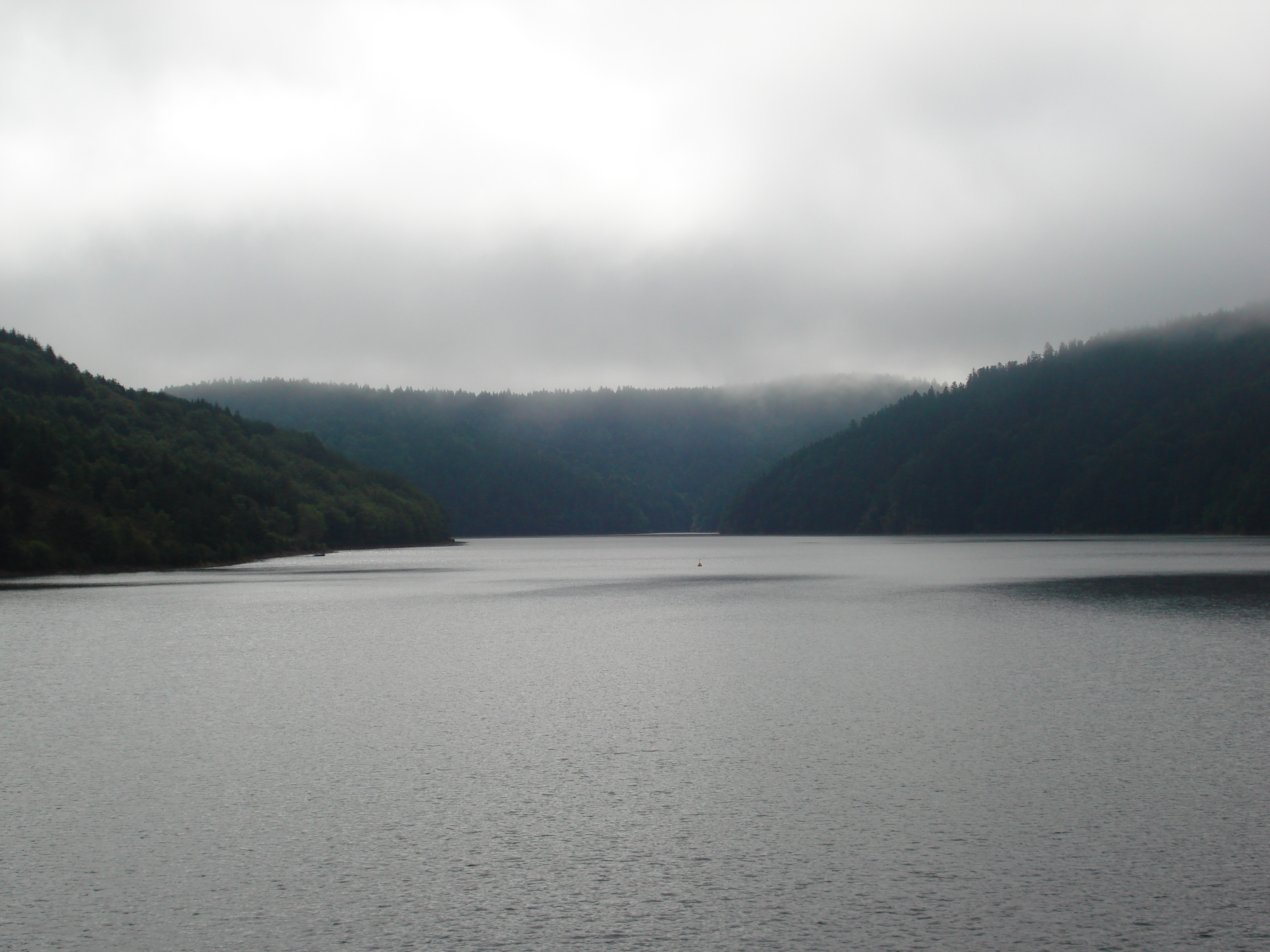

- Location within Auvergne-Rhône-Alpes
- Location: Cantal
- Coordinates: 44°55′14″N 3°06′48″E
- Type: Reservoir
- Primary inflows: Truyère, Bès, l'Ander
- Primary outflows: Truyère
- Basin countries: France
- Surface area: 11 km^{2} (4.2 sq mi)
- Max. depth: 79 m (259 ft)
- Surface elevation: 742 m (2,434 ft)

Lac de Grandval is a reservoir lake in Cantal, France. At an elevation of 742 m, its surface area is 11 km^{2}.

The lake lies in the communes of Alleuze, Faverolles and Fridefont; at its western end is the hydroelectric dam by the name of Barrage de Grandval, between Lavastrie and Fridefont. The lake hosts a temperate oceanic climate.
