= Loubaresse =

Loubaresse may refer to the following places in France:

- Loubaresse, Ardèche, a commune in the department of Ardèche
- Loubaresse, Cantal, a commune in the department of Cantal
