= Neuvéglise-sur-Truyère =

Commune in Auvergne-Rhône-Alpes, France

- Commune
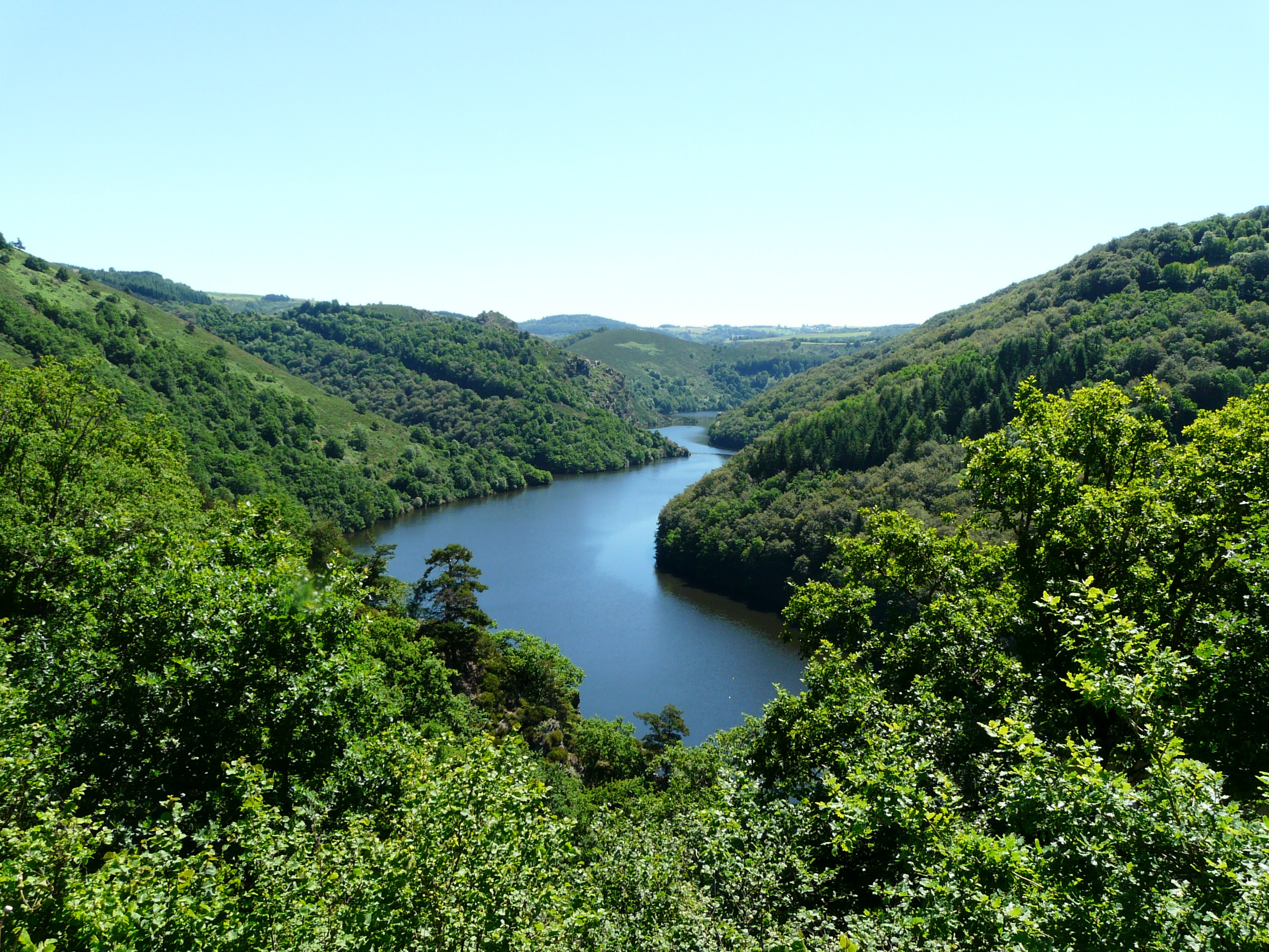
- The Truyère gorge
- Location of Neuvéglise-sur-Truyère
- Location within France Location within Auvergne-Rhône-Alpes
- Coordinates: 44°55′44″N 2°59′02″E
- Country: France
- Region: Auvergne-Rhône-Alpes
- Department: Cantal
- Arrondissement: Saint-Flour
- Canton: Neuvéglise-sur-Truyère
- Intercommunality: Saint-Flour Communauté

Government
  - Mayor (2020–2026): Céline Charriaud
- Area^{1}: 125.23 km^{2} (48.35 sq mi)
- Population (2023): 1,677
  - Density: 13.39/km^{2} (34.68/sq mi)
- Time zone: UTC+01:00 (CET)
  - Summer (DST): UTC+02:00 (CEST)
- INSEE/Postal code: 15142 /15100, 15260
- ^{1} French Land Register data, which excludes lakes, ponds, glaciers > 1 km^{2} (0.386 sq mi or 247 acres) and river estuaries.

Neuvéglise-sur-Truyère (French pronunciation: [nœveɡliz syʁ tʁyjɛʁ], literally Neuvéglise on Truyère; Auvergnat: Nòvaglèisa de Trueire) is a commune in the department of Cantal, south-central France. The municipality was established on 1 January 2017 by merger of the former communes of Neuvéglise (the seat), Lavastrie, Oradour and Sériers.

== See also ==
- Communes of the Cantal department
