= Faverolles-lès-Lucey =

- Commune
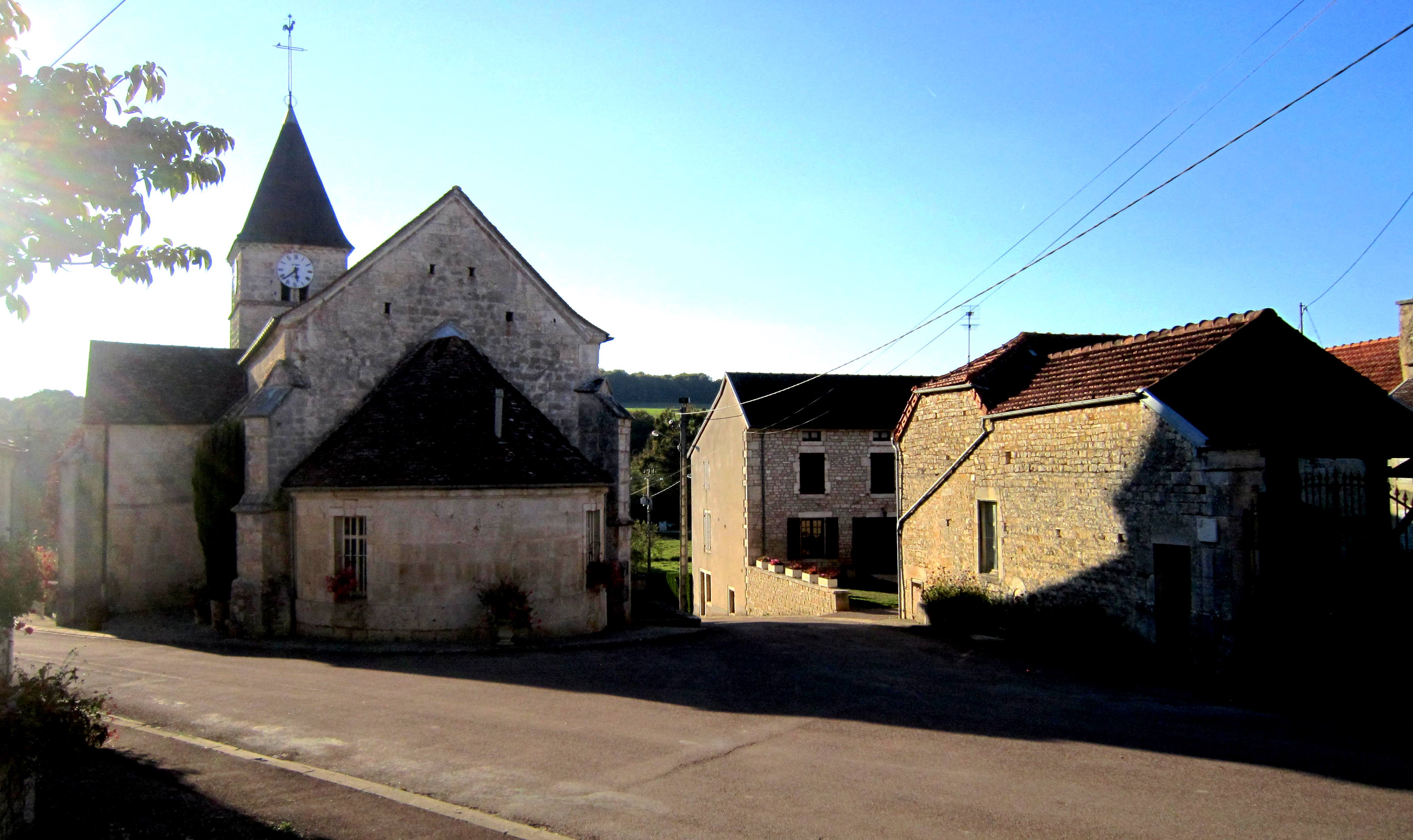
- The church and surroundings in Faverolles-lès-Lucey
- Location of Faverolles-lès-Lucey
- Location within France Location within Bourgogne-Franche-Comté
- Coordinates: 47°50′12″N 4°51′48″E
- Country: France
- Region: Bourgogne-Franche-Comté
- Department: Côte-d'Or
- Arrondissement: Montbard
- Canton: Châtillon-sur-Seine
- Intercommunality: Pays Châtillonnais

Government
  - Mayor (2020–2026): Jean-François Giera
- Area^{1}: 10.08 km^{2} (3.89 sq mi)
- Elevation: 350 m (1,150 ft)
- Highest elevation: 411 m (1,348 ft)
- Lowest elevation: 306 m (1,004 ft)
- Population (2023): 29
  - Density: 2.9/km^{2} (7.5/sq mi)
- Time zone: UTC+01:00 (CET)
  - Summer (DST): UTC+02:00 (CEST)
- INSEE/Postal code: 21262 /21290
- ^{1} French Land Register data, which excludes lakes, ponds, glaciers > 1 km^{2} (0.386 sq mi or 247 acres) and river estuaries.

Faverolles-lès-Lucey (French pronunciation: [favʁɔl lɛ lysɛ], literally Faverolles near Lucey) is a commune in the Côte-d'Or department in eastern France.

== Population ==
Historical population
Year	Pop.	±% p.a.
1968	41	—
1975	43	+0.68%
1982	36	−2.51%
1990	17	−8.95%
1999	22	+2.91%
2007	36	+6.35%
2012	35	−0.56%
2017	31	−2.40%
2023	29	−1.11%
Source: INSEE

== See also ==
- Communes of the Côte-d'Or department
