= Saint-Marc, Cantal =

Saint-Marc
- Part of Val-d'Arcomie
- Location of Saint-Marc
- Location within France Location within Auvergne-Rhône-Alpes
- Coordinates: 44°54′09″N 3°11′33″E
- Country: France
- Region: Auvergne-Rhône-Alpes
- Department: Cantal
- Arrondissement: Saint-Flour
- Canton: Neuvéglise
- Commune: Val-d'Arcomie
- Area^{1}: 8.78 km^{2} (3.39 sq mi)
- Elevation: 980 m (3,220 ft)
- Highest elevation: 1,051 m (3,448 ft)
- Lowest elevation: 828 m (2,717 ft)
- Population (2019): 81
  - Density: 9.2/km^{2} (24/sq mi)
- Time zone: UTC+01:00 (CET)
  - Summer (DST): UTC+02:00 (CEST)
- Postal code: 15320
- ^{1} French Land Register data, which excludes lakes, ponds, glaciers > 1 km^{2} (0.386 sq mi or 247 acres) and river estuaries.

Saint-Marc (French pronunciation: [sɛ̃ maʁk]; Auvergnat: Sant Marc) is a former commune in the Cantal department in south-central France. On 1 January 2016, it was merged into the new commune Val-d'Arcomie.

== See also ==
- Communes of the Cantal department
