= Neuvéglise =

Commune in Cantal, France

- Part of Neuvéglise-sur-Truyère
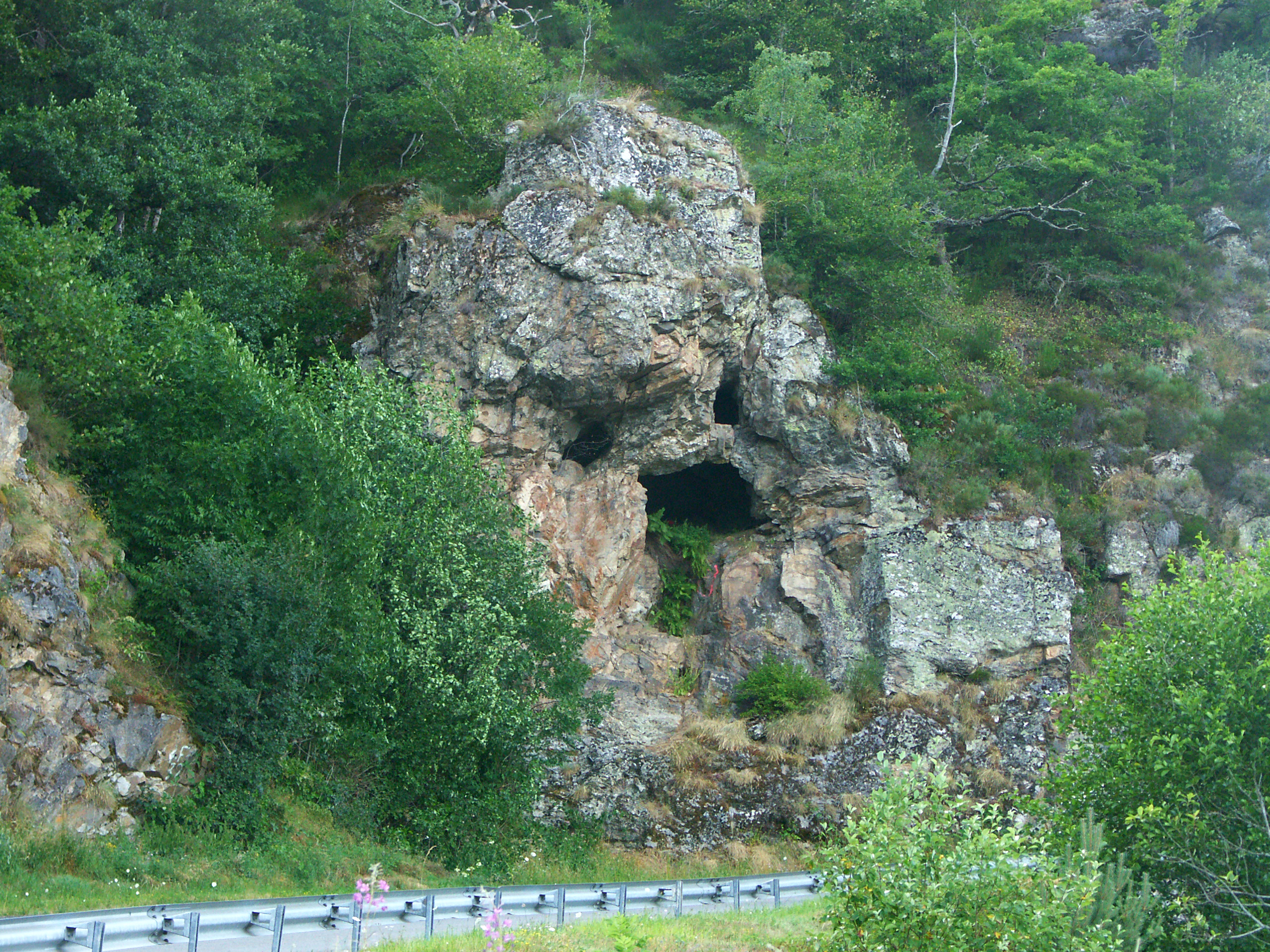
- The head of the devil, in Neuvéglise

- Coat of arms
- Location of Neuvéglise
- Location within France Location within Auvergne-Rhône-Alpes
- Coordinates: 44°55′44″N 2°59′02″E
- Country: France
- Region: Auvergne-Rhône-Alpes
- Department: Cantal
- Arrondissement: Saint-Flour
- Canton: Neuvéglise
- Commune: Neuvéglise-sur-Truyère
- Area^{1}: 54.7 km^{2} (21.1 sq mi)
- Elevation: 947 m (3,107 ft)
- Highest elevation: 1,055 m (3,461 ft)
- Lowest elevation: 635 m (2,083 ft)
- Population (2022): 1,061
  - Density: 19.4/km^{2} (50.2/sq mi)
- Time zone: UTC+01:00 (CET)
  - Summer (DST): UTC+02:00 (CEST)
- Postal code: 15260
- ^{1} French Land Register data, which excludes lakes, ponds, glaciers > 1 km^{2} (0.386 sq mi or 247 acres) and river estuaries.

Neuvéglise (French pronunciation: [nœveɡliz]; Auvergnat: Nòvaglèisa) is a former commune in the Cantal department in south-central France. On 1 January 2017, it was merged into the new commune Neuvéglise-sur-Truyère.

== Population ==
Historical population
Year	Pop.	±% p.a.
1962	1,537	—
1968	1,305	−2.69%
1975	1,260	−0.50%
1982	1,112	−1.77%
1990	1,078	−0.39%
1999	1,022	−0.59%
2006	1,133	+1.48%
2022	1,061	−0.41%
Source: EHESS and INSEE (2022)

== See also ==
- Communes of the Cantal department
