= Selves (river) =

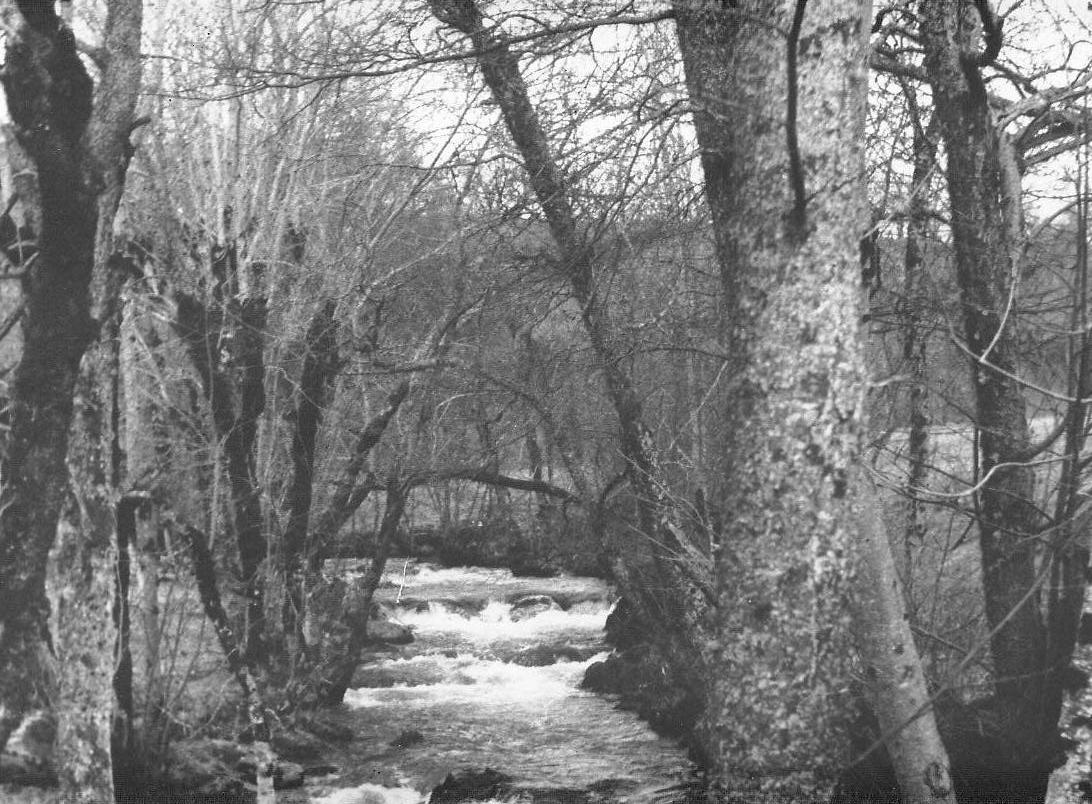

- Location within France Location within Occitanie

Location
- Country: France

Physical characteristics
- Mouth: Truyère
  - coordinates: 44°40′28″N 2°34′30″E
- Length: 44.5 km (27.7 mi)

Basin features
- Progression: Truyère→ Lot→ Garonne→ Gironde estuary→ Atlantic Ocean

The Selves (Occitan: Sèu) is a river in the Aveyron department, France. It is a left tributary of the Truyère, into which it flows near Campouriez. It is approximately 44.5 km long.
