= Saint-Just, Cantal =

Saint-Just
- Part of Val-d'Arcomie
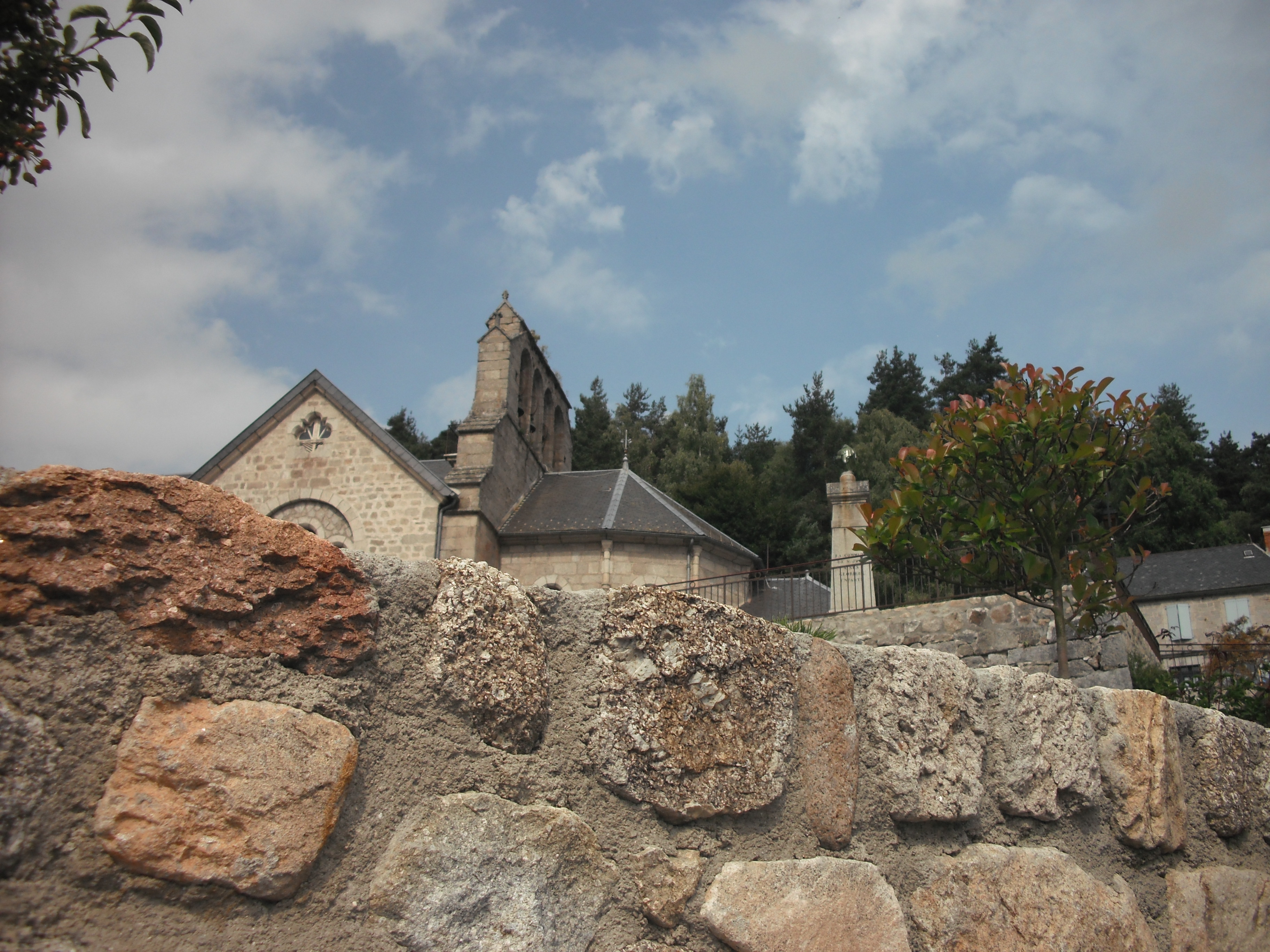
- The church in Saint-Just
- Location of Saint-Just
- Location within France Location within Auvergne-Rhône-Alpes
- Coordinates: 44°53′29″N 3°12′34″E
- Country: France
- Region: Auvergne-Rhône-Alpes
- Department: Cantal
- Arrondissement: Saint-Flour
- Canton: Neuvéglise
- Commune: Val-d'Arcomie
- Area^{1}: 17.06 km^{2} (6.59 sq mi)
- Elevation: 880 m (2,890 ft)
- Highest elevation: 1,087 m (3,566 ft)
- Lowest elevation: 868 m (2,848 ft)
- Population (2019): 191
  - Density: 11.2/km^{2} (29.0/sq mi)
- Time zone: UTC+01:00 (CET)
  - Summer (DST): UTC+02:00 (CEST)
- Postal code: 15320
- ^{1} French Land Register data, which excludes lakes, ponds, glaciers > 1 km^{2} (0.386 sq mi or 247 acres) and river estuaries.

Saint-Just (French pronunciation: [sɛ̃ ʒy(st)]; Auvergnat: Sant Just) is a former commune in the Cantal department in south-central France. On 1 January 2016, it was merged into the new commune Val-d'Arcomie.

== Population ==
Historical population

Year	Pop.	±% p.a.
1793	723	—
1821	709	−0.07%
1846	624	−0.51%
1872	570	−0.35%
1901	530	−0.25%
1926	462	−0.55%
1946	391	−0.83%
1962	362	−0.48%

Year	Pop.	±% p.a.
1968	299	−3.14%
1975	286	−0.63%
1982	271	−0.77%
1990	248	−1.10%
1999	222	−1.22%
2006	209	−0.86%
2019	191	−0.69%

Source: EHESS and INSEE (2019)

== See also ==
- Communes of the Cantal department
