= Château d'Alleuze =

Castle in Alleuze, France

Coordinates: 44°57′22″N 3°5′27″E

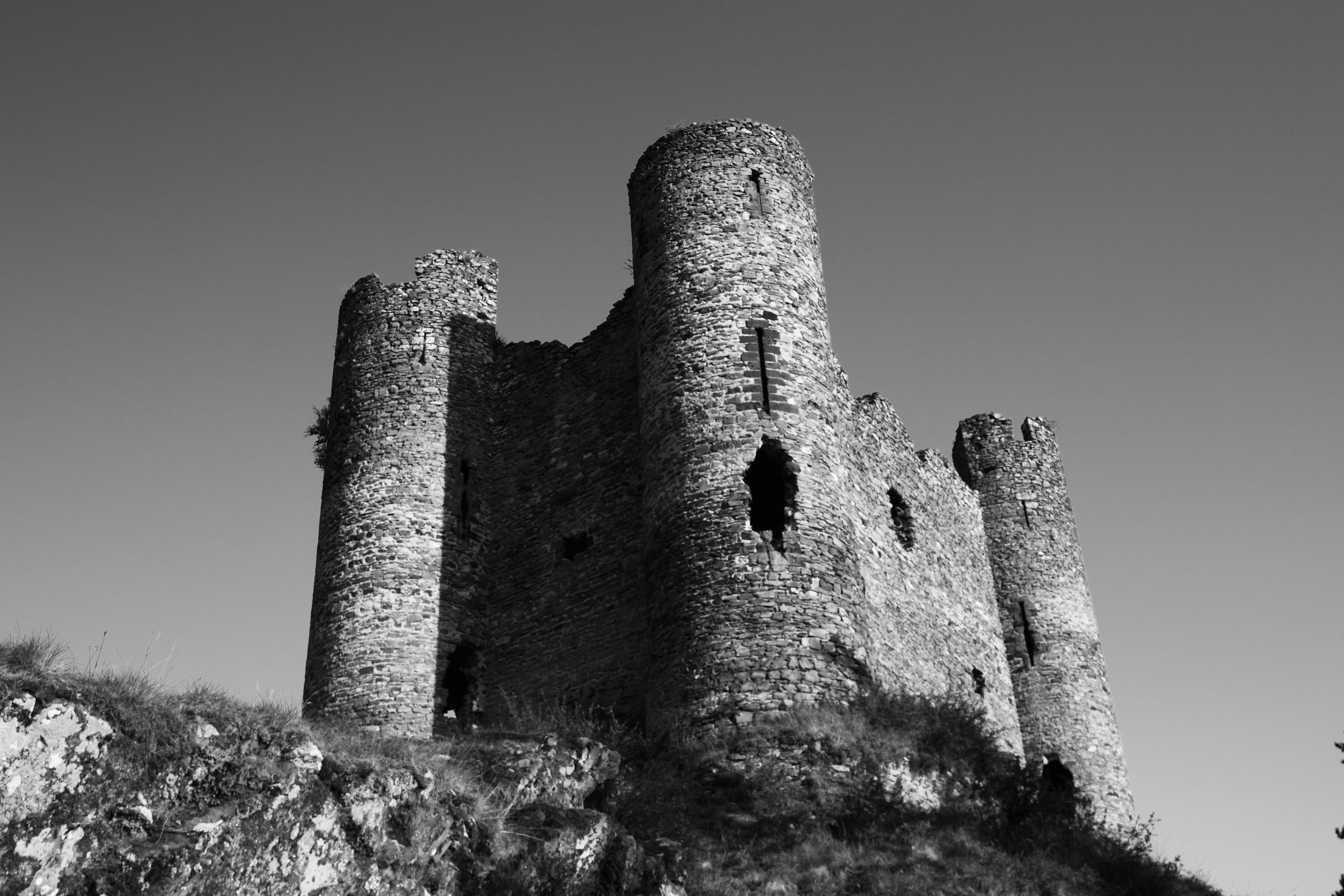
Château d'Alleuze

The Château d'Alleuze is a ruined castle situated in the commune of Alleuze, in the Cantal département of France.

Built in the 13th century by the constables of Auvergne, it belonged to the bishops of Clermont. During the Hundred Years War it was seized for the English by Bernard de Garlan. For seven years, he sowed terror throughout the region, pillaging and holding to ransom. To avoid troubles from any Garlan successors, the inhabitants of Saint-Flour burned down the castle in 1405. Monseigneur De la Tour, owner of the castle, was very upset with this gesture, and obliged the Sanflorains to rebuild it on the original plan. It was taken by Huguenots in 1575. The towers were used as jails by the bishops of Clermont.

The castle is built on a square plan, with round towers in each corner, characteristic of the 14th century. It includes a chapel, Saint-Illide, built in the 13th and 15th centuries.

Today, the edifice is maintained as a ruin and has been listed, along with the chapel, since 1927 as a monument historique by the French Ministry of Culture. According to the Michelin Green Guide to the Auvergne and Rhône Valley, which rates it as two stars ("worth a detour"), "There can scarcely be another beauty spot in the Auvergne as romantic as the site of this castle."

== Gallery ==
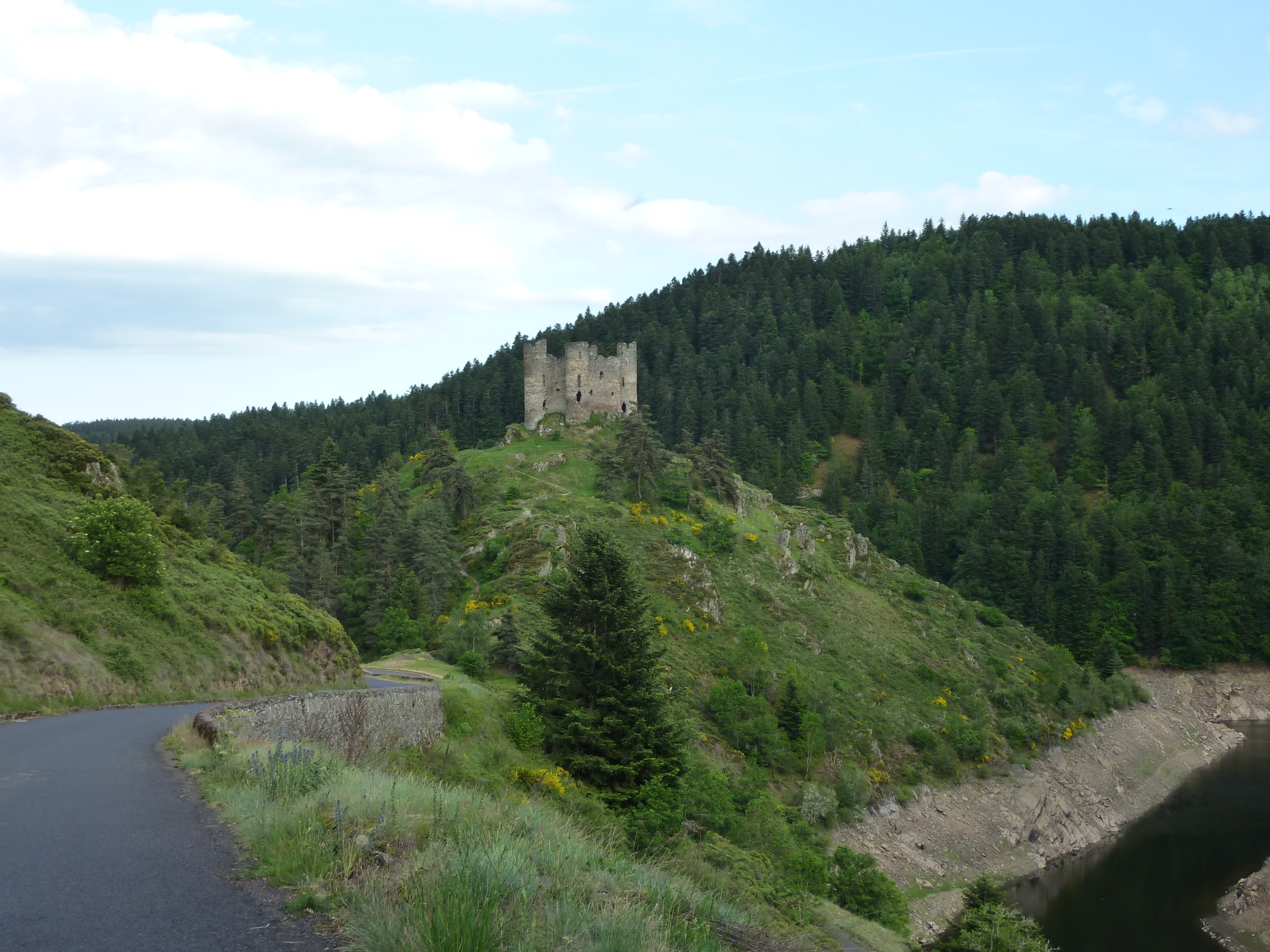
Truyère river and Château d'Alleuze

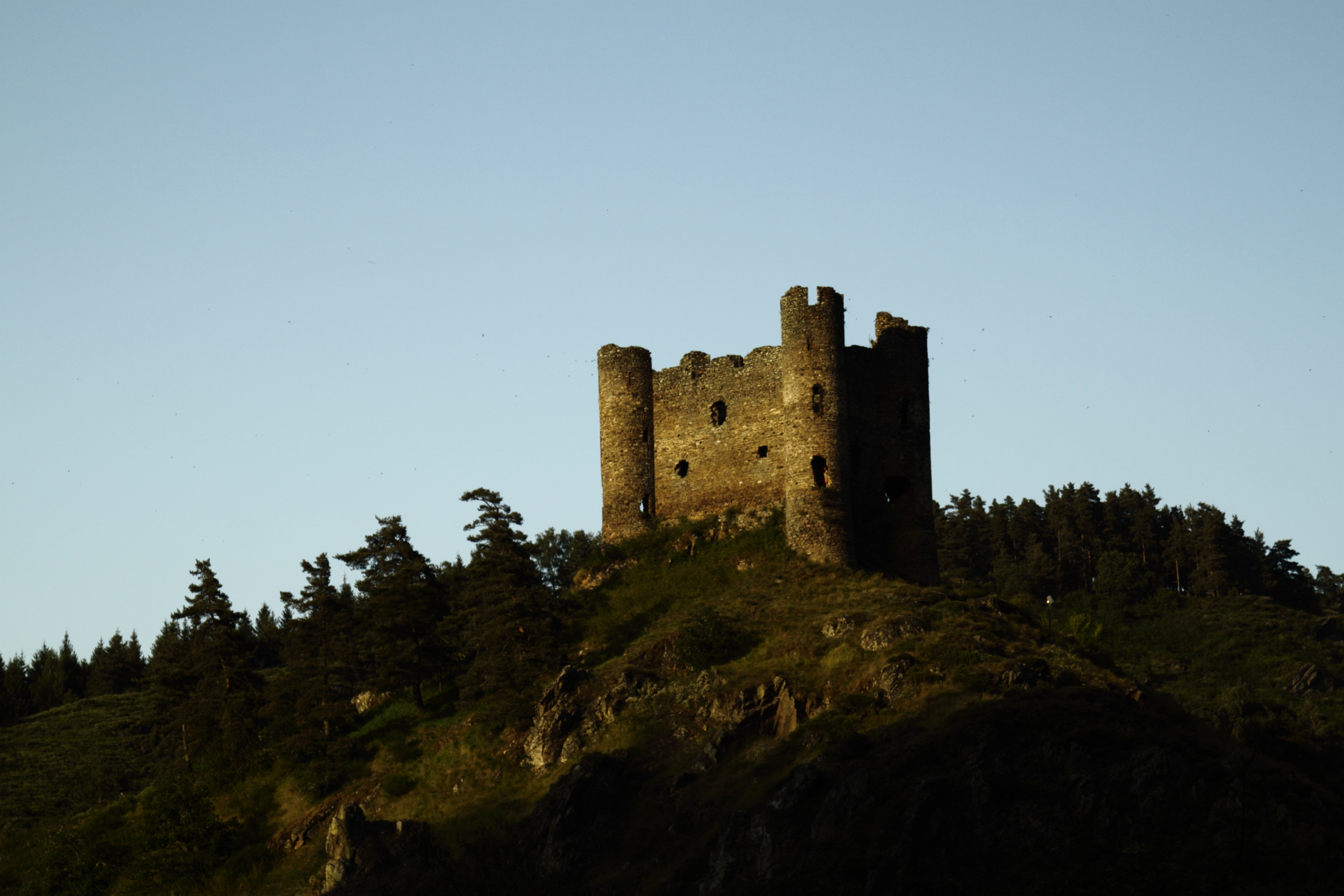

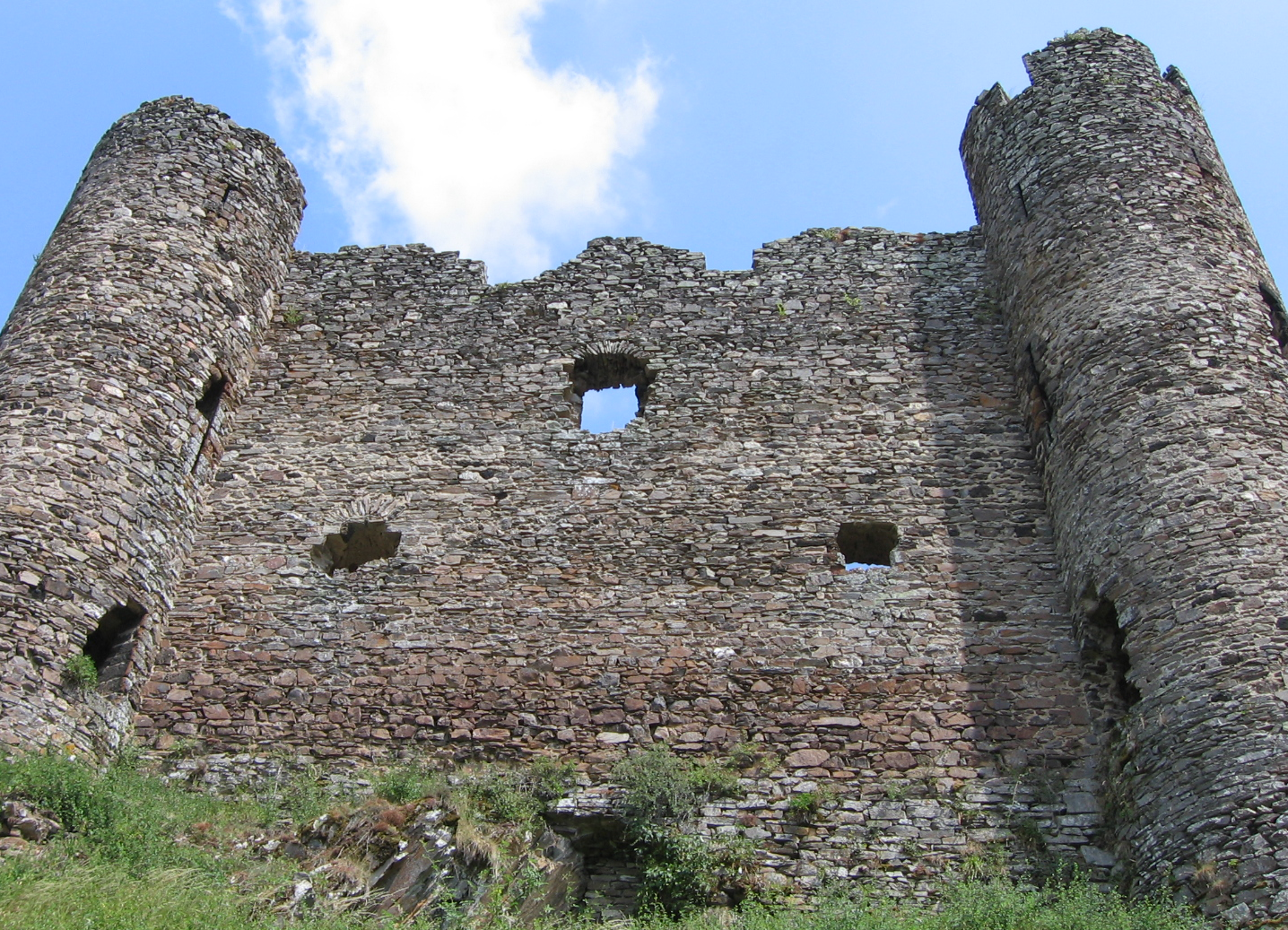

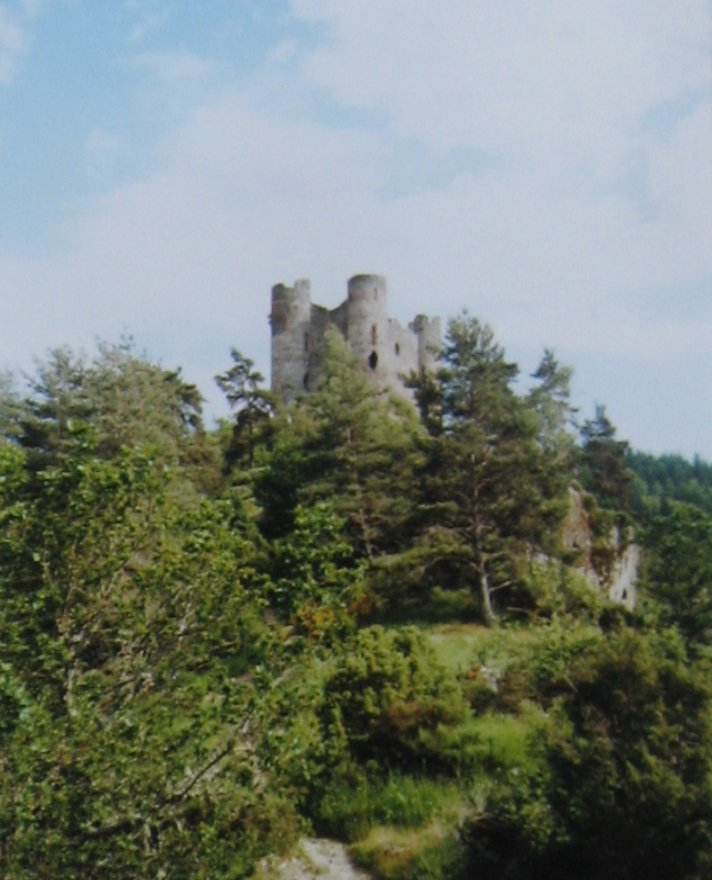

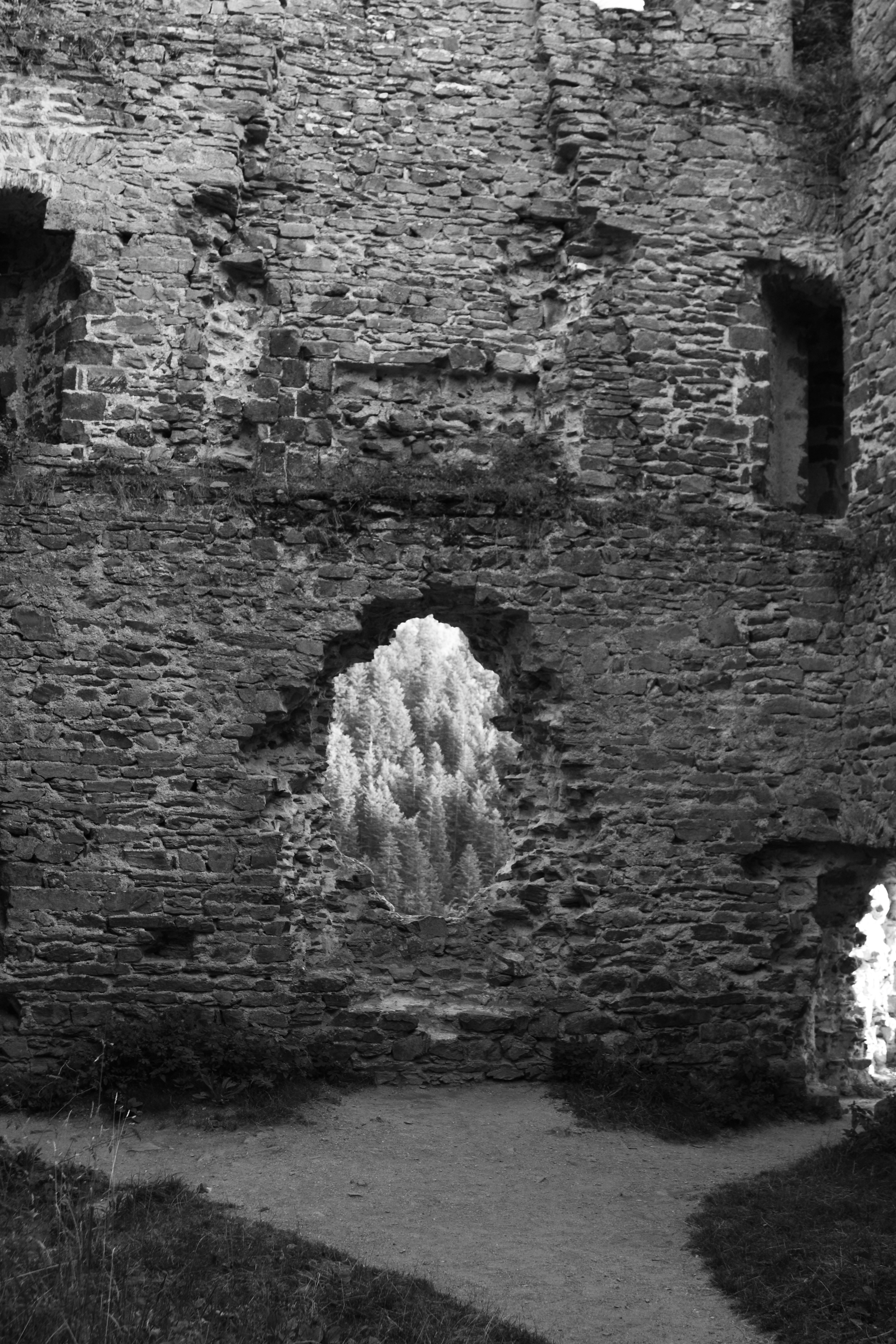
interior

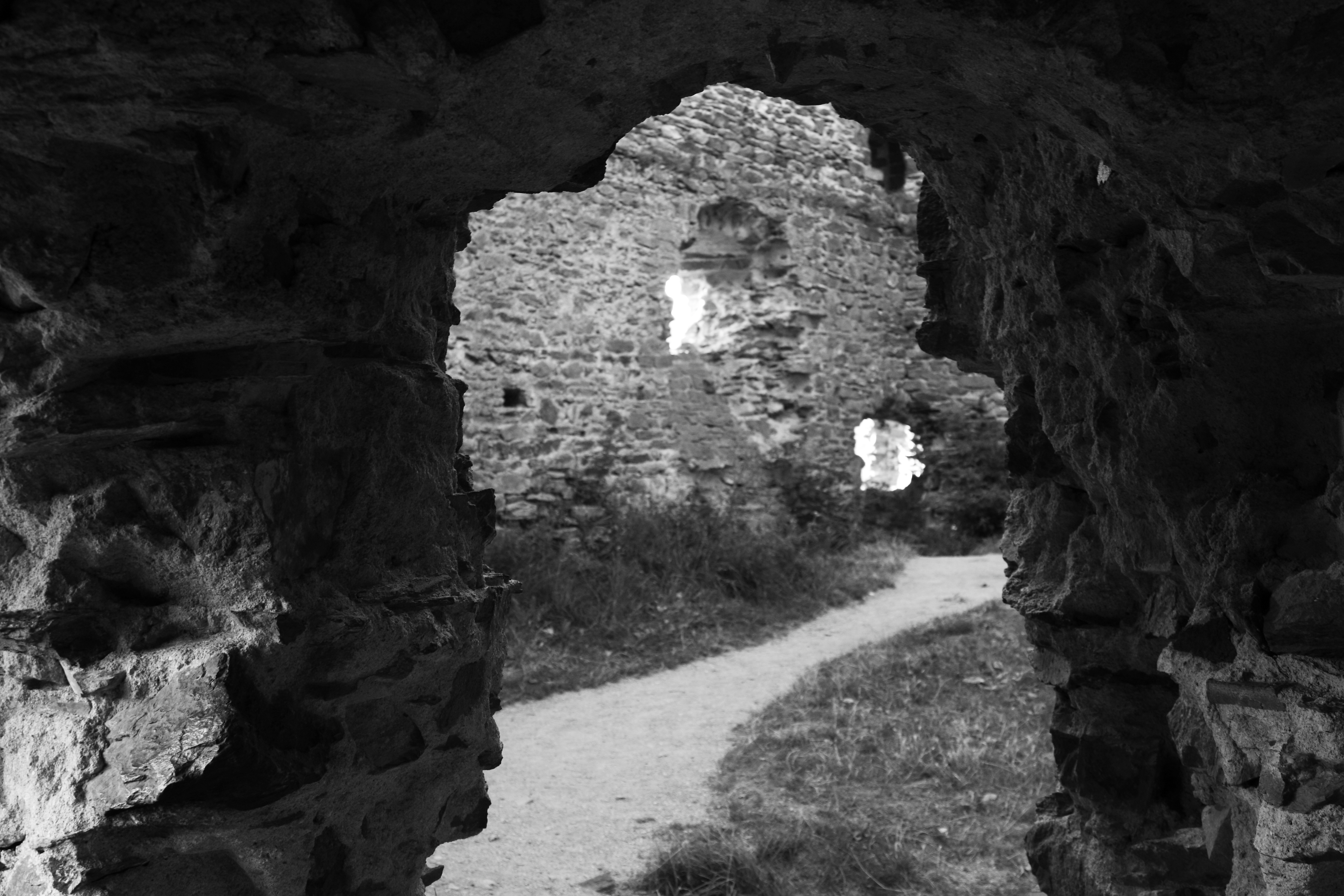
interior

== See also ==
List of castles in France
