= Sériers =

- Part of Neuvéglise-sur-Truyère
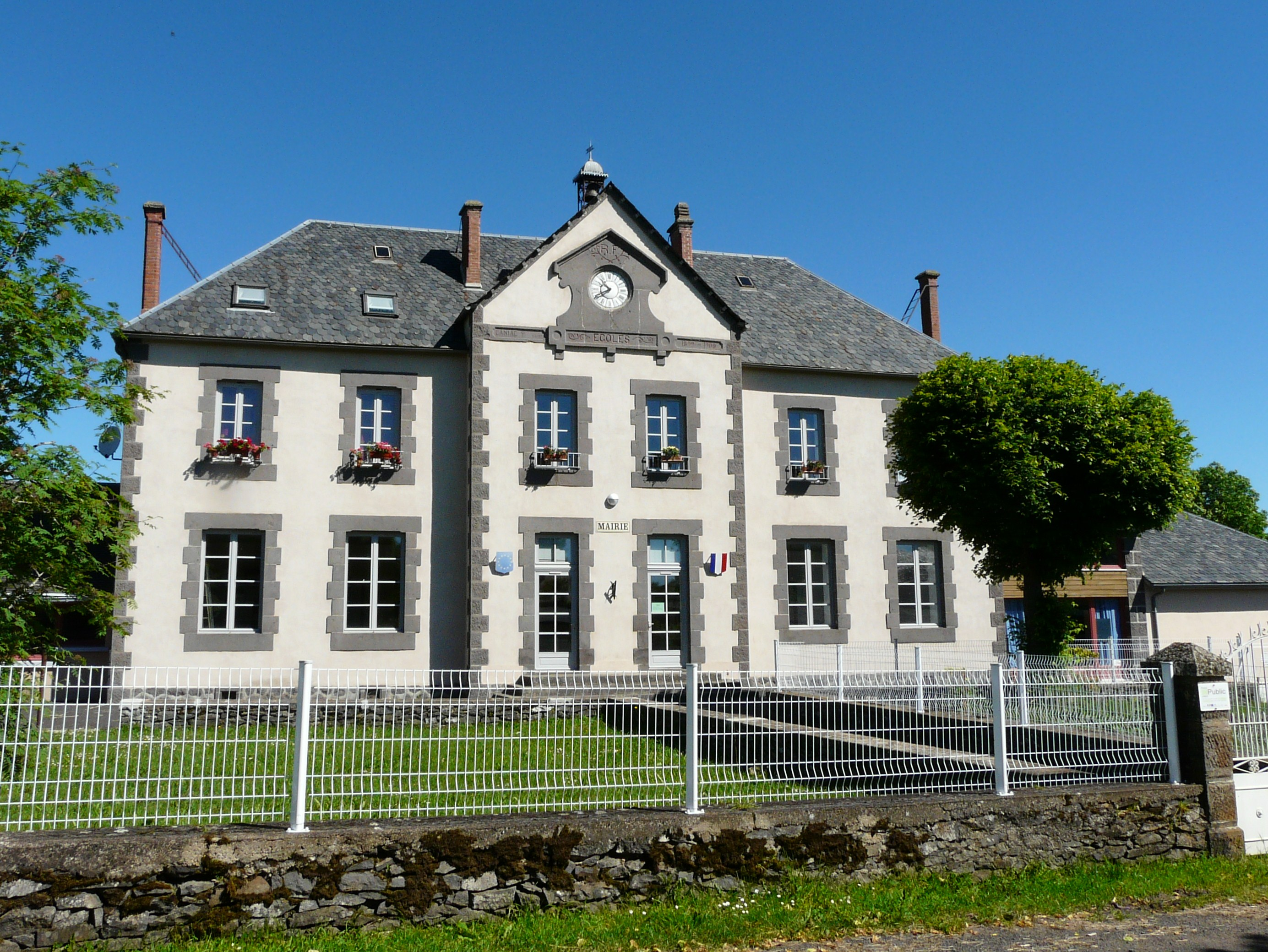
- Town hall
- Location of Sériers
- Location within France Location within Auvergne-Rhône-Alpes
- Coordinates: 44°58′37″N 3°02′25″E
- Country: France
- Region: Auvergne-Rhône-Alpes
- Department: Cantal
- Arrondissement: Saint-Flour
- Canton: Saint-Flour-2
- Commune: Neuvéglise-sur-Truyère
- Area^{1}: 12.62 km^{2} (4.87 sq mi)
- Elevation: 1,000 m (3,300 ft)
- Highest elevation: 1,016 m (3,333 ft)
- Lowest elevation: 757 m (2,484 ft)
- Population (2023): 146
  - Density: 11.6/km^{2} (30.0/sq mi)
- Time zone: UTC+01:00 (CET)
  - Summer (DST): UTC+02:00 (CEST)
- Postal code: 15100
- ^{1} French Land Register data, which excludes lakes, ponds, glaciers > 1 km^{2} (0.386 sq mi or 247 acres) and river estuaries.

Sériers (French pronunciation: [seʁje]; Auvergnat: Cerièrs) is a former commune in the Cantal department in south-central France. On 1 January 2017, it was merged into the new commune Neuvéglise-sur-Truyère.

== See also ==
- Communes of the Cantal department
