= Val-d'Arcomie =

Commune in Auvergne-Rhône-Alpes, France

- Commune
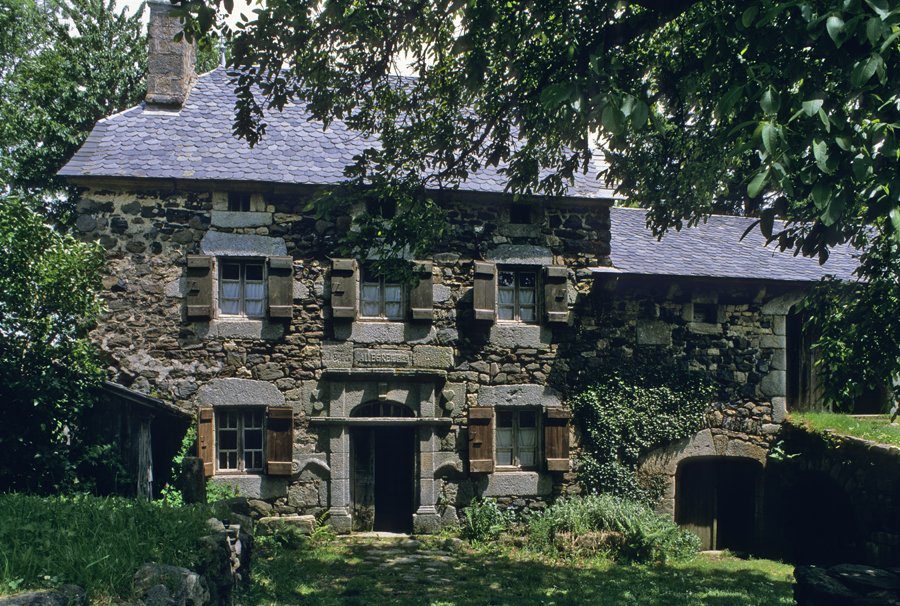
- Allègre farm, in the village of Loubaresse
- Location of Val-d'Arcomie
- Location within France Location within Auvergne-Rhône-Alpes
- Coordinates: 44°56′02″N 3°12′40″E
- Country: France
- Region: Auvergne-Rhône-Alpes
- Department: Cantal
- Arrondissement: Saint-Flour
- Canton: Neuvéglise-sur-Truyère

Government
  - Mayor (2020–2026): Romuald Rivière
- Area^{1}: 86.27 km^{2} (33.31 sq mi)
- Population (2023): 922
  - Density: 10.7/km^{2} (27.7/sq mi)
- Time zone: UTC+01:00 (CET)
  - Summer (DST): UTC+02:00 (CEST)
- INSEE/Postal code: 15108 /15320
- ^{1} French Land Register data, which excludes lakes, ponds, glaciers > 1 km^{2} (0.386 sq mi or 247 acres) and river estuaries.

Val-d'Arcomie (French pronunciation: [val daʁkɔmi]; Auvergnat: Val d'Arcòmia) is a commune in the Cantal department of southern France. The municipality was established on 1 January 2016 and consists of the former communes of Loubaresse, Faverolles, Saint-Just and Saint-Marc.

== See also ==
- Communes of the Cantal department
