= Faverolles, Cantal =

Faverolles
- Part of Val-d'Arcomie
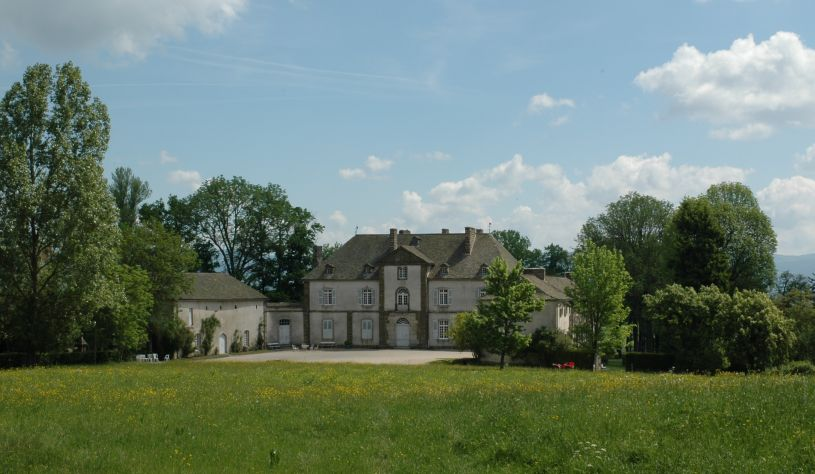
- The Château du Chassan, in Faverolles
- Location of Faverolles
- Location within France Location within Auvergne-Rhône-Alpes
- Coordinates: 44°56′30″N 3°08′49″E
- Country: France
- Region: Auvergne-Rhône-Alpes
- Department: Cantal
- Arrondissement: Saint-Flour
- Canton: Neuvéglise
- Commune: Val-d'Arcomie
- Area^{1}: 32.19 km^{2} (12.43 sq mi)
- Elevation: 945 m (3,100 ft)
- Highest elevation: 1,066 m (3,497 ft)
- Lowest elevation: 733 m (2,405 ft)
- Population (2019): 291
  - Density: 9.04/km^{2} (23.4/sq mi)
- Time zone: UTC+01:00 (CET)
  - Summer (DST): UTC+02:00 (CEST)
- Postal code: 15320
- ^{1} French Land Register data, which excludes lakes, ponds, glaciers > 1 km^{2} (0.386 sq mi or 247 acres) and river estuaries.

Faverolles (French pronunciation: [favʁɔl]; Auvergnat: Favairòlas) is a former commune in the Cantal department in south-central France. On 1 January 2016, it was merged into the new commune Val-d'Arcomie.

== Population ==
Historical population
Year	Pop.	±% p.a.
1962	634	—
1968	549	−2.37%
1975	502	−1.27%
1982	441	−1.83%
1990	378	−1.91%
1999	334	−1.37%
2019	291	−0.69%
Source: EHESS and INSEE (2019)

== See also ==
- Lac de Grandval
- Communes of the Cantal department
