= Fridefont =

Commune in Auvergne-Rhône-Alpes, France

- Commune
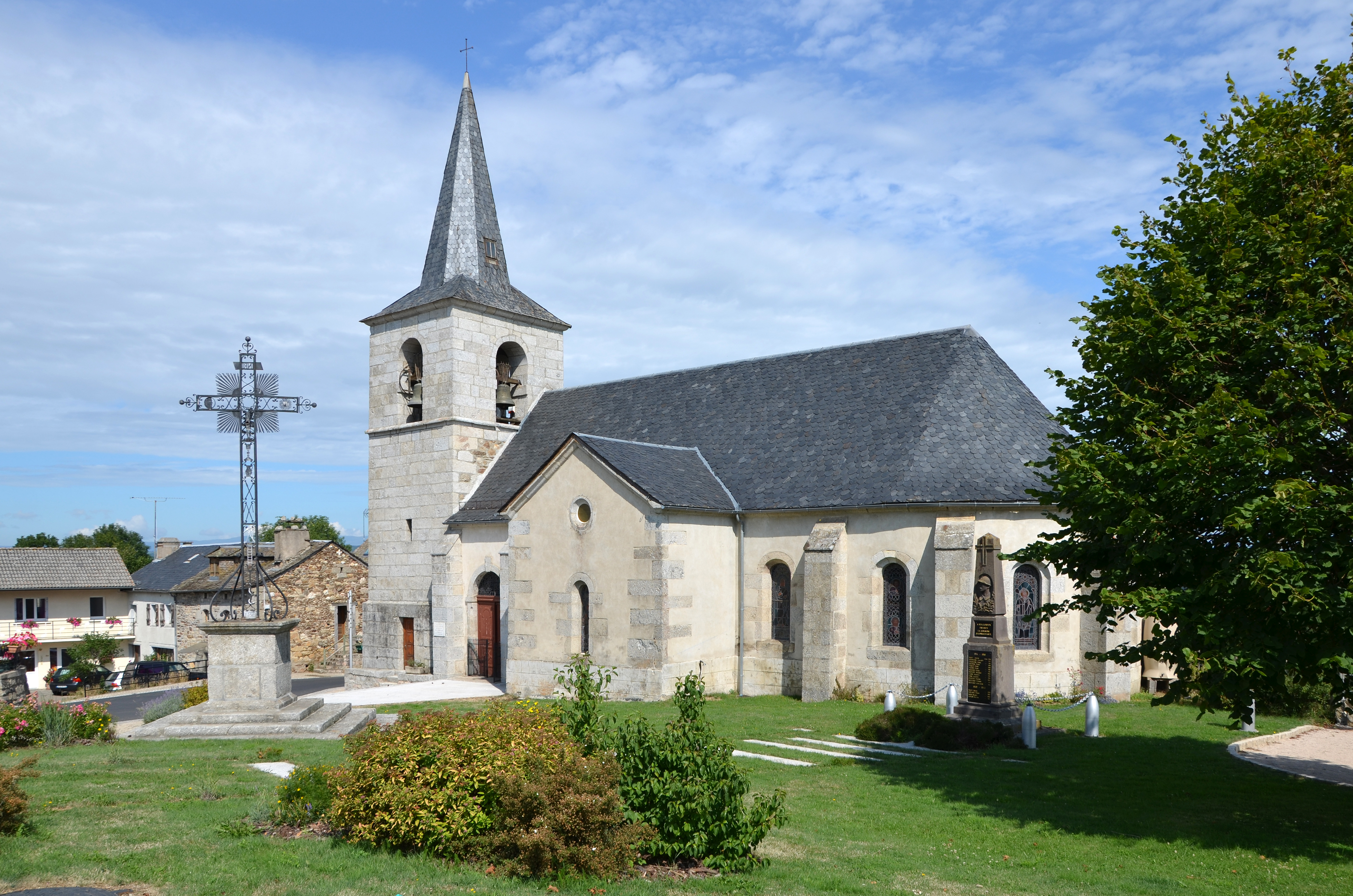
- The church in Fridefont

- Coat of arms
- Location of Fridefont
- Location within France Location within Auvergne-Rhône-Alpes
- Coordinates: 44°54′07″N 3°05′15″E
- Country: France
- Region: Auvergne-Rhône-Alpes
- Department: Cantal
- Arrondissement: Saint-Flour
- Canton: Neuvéglise-sur-Truyère
- Intercommunality: Saint-Flour Communauté

Government
  - Mayor (2020–2026): Pierre Chassang
- Area^{1}: 13.96 km^{2} (5.39 sq mi)
- Elevation: 950 m (3,120 ft)
- Highest elevation: 956 m (3,136 ft)
- Lowest elevation: 660 m (2,170 ft)
- Population (2023): 103
  - Density: 7.38/km^{2} (19.1/sq mi)
- Time zone: UTC+01:00 (CET)
  - Summer (DST): UTC+02:00 (CEST)
- INSEE/Postal code: 15073 /15110
- ^{1} French Land Register data, which excludes lakes, ponds, glaciers > 1 km^{2} (0.386 sq mi or 247 acres) and river estuaries.

Fridefont (French pronunciation: [fʁidfɔ̃]; Occitan: Freidafònt) is a commune in the Cantal department in south-central France.

== Population ==
Historical population
Year	Pop.	±% p.a.
1968	148	—
1975	131	−1.73%
1982	124	−0.78%
1990	126	+0.20%
1999	134	+0.69%
2007	123	−1.06%
2012	98	−4.44%
2017	103	+1.00%
2023	103	+0.00%
Source: INSEE

== See also ==
- Lac de Grandval
- Communes of the Cantal department
