= Lucey, Côte-d'Or =

Lucey
- Commune
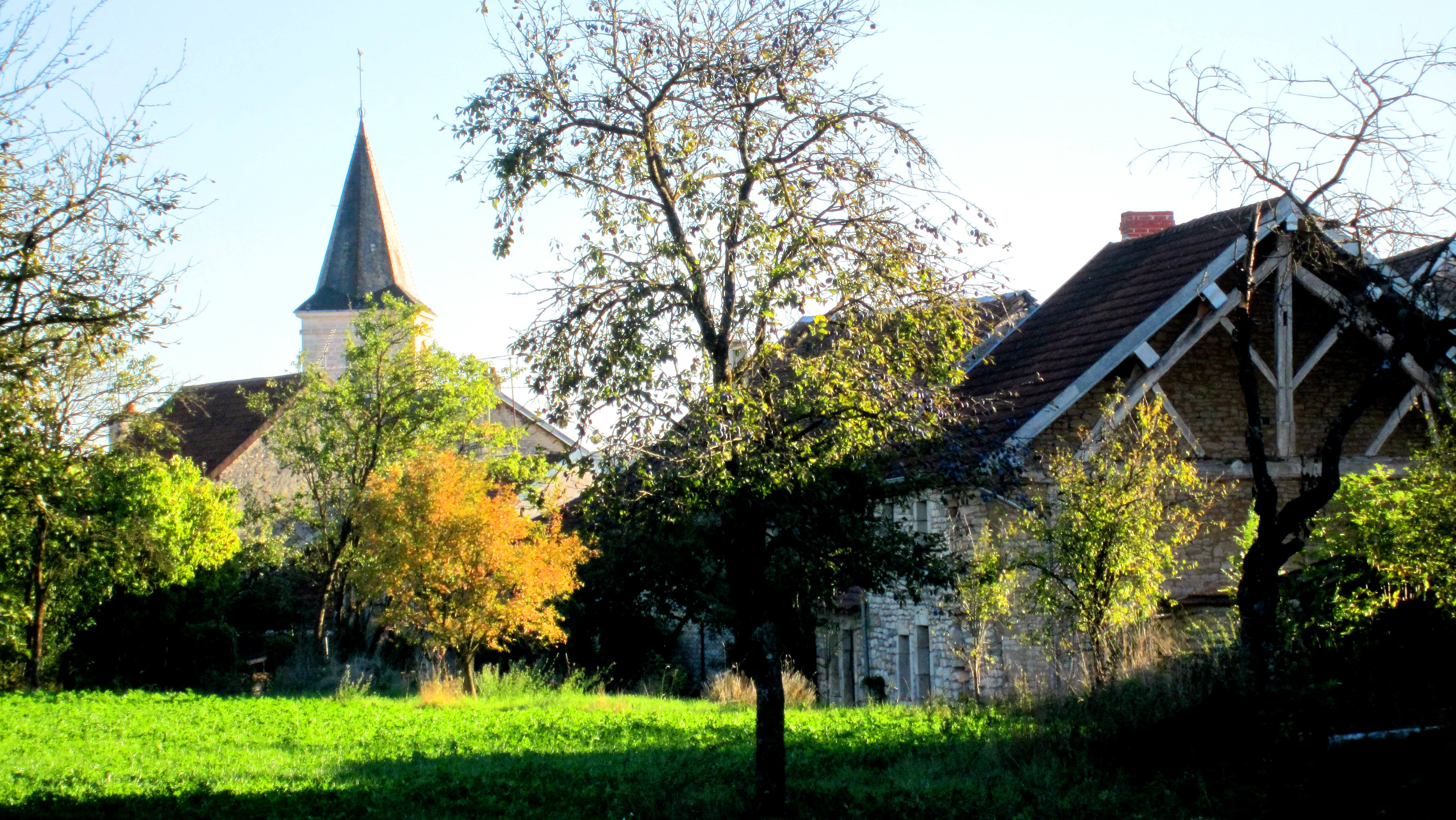
- A general view of Lucey

- Coat of arms
- Location of Lucey
- Location within France Location within Bourgogne-Franche-Comté
- Coordinates: 47°51′12″N 4°51′45″E
- Country: France
- Region: Bourgogne-Franche-Comté
- Department: Côte-d'Or
- Arrondissement: Montbard
- Canton: Châtillon-sur-Seine
- Intercommunality: Pays Châtillonnais

Government
  - Mayor (2020–2026): Alain Trexon
- Area^{1}: 18.68 km^{2} (7.21 sq mi)
- Elevation: 372 m (1,220 ft)
- Highest elevation: 417 m (1,368 ft)
- Lowest elevation: 293 m (961 ft)
- Population (2023): 56
  - Density: 3.0/km^{2} (7.8/sq mi)
- Time zone: UTC+01:00 (CET)
  - Summer (DST): UTC+02:00 (CEST)
- INSEE/Postal code: 21359 /21290
- ^{1} French Land Register data, which excludes lakes, ponds, glaciers > 1 km^{2} (0.386 sq mi or 247 acres) and river estuaries.

Lucey (French pronunciation: [lysɛ]) is a commune in the Côte-d'Or department in eastern France.

== Population ==
Historical population
Year	Pop.	±% p.a.
1968	78	—
1975	80	+0.36%
1982	73	−1.30%
1990	55	−3.48%
1999	61	+1.16%
2007	57	−0.84%
2012	56	−0.35%
2017	60	+1.39%
2023	56	−1.14%
Source: INSEE

== See also ==
- Communes of the Côte-d'Or department
