= Oradour, Cantal =

Oradour
- Part of Neuvéglise-sur-Truyère
- Coat of arms
- Location of Oradour
- Location within France Location within Auvergne-Rhône-Alpes
- Coordinates: 44°55′12″N 2°56′07″E
- Country: France
- Region: Auvergne-Rhône-Alpes
- Department: Cantal
- Arrondissement: Saint-Flour
- Canton: Saint-Flour-2
- Commune: Neuvéglise-sur-Truyère
- Area^{1}: 33.77 km^{2} (13.04 sq mi)
- Elevation: 940 m (3,080 ft)
- Highest elevation: 1,159 m (3,802 ft)
- Lowest elevation: 620 m (2,030 ft)
- Population (2023): 223
  - Density: 6.60/km^{2} (17.1/sq mi)
- Time zone: UTC+01:00 (CET)
  - Summer (DST): UTC+02:00 (CEST)
- Postal code: 15260
- ^{1} French Land Register data, which excludes lakes, ponds, glaciers > 1 km^{2} (0.386 sq mi or 247 acres) and river estuaries.

Oradour (French pronunciation: [ɔʁaduʁ]; Auvergnat: Orador) is a former commune in the département of Cantal in south-central France. On 1 January 2017, it was merged into the new commune Neuvéglise-sur-Truyère.

== See also ==
- Communes of the Cantal department
