= Loubaresse, Cantal =

Loubaresse
- Part of Val-d'Arcomie
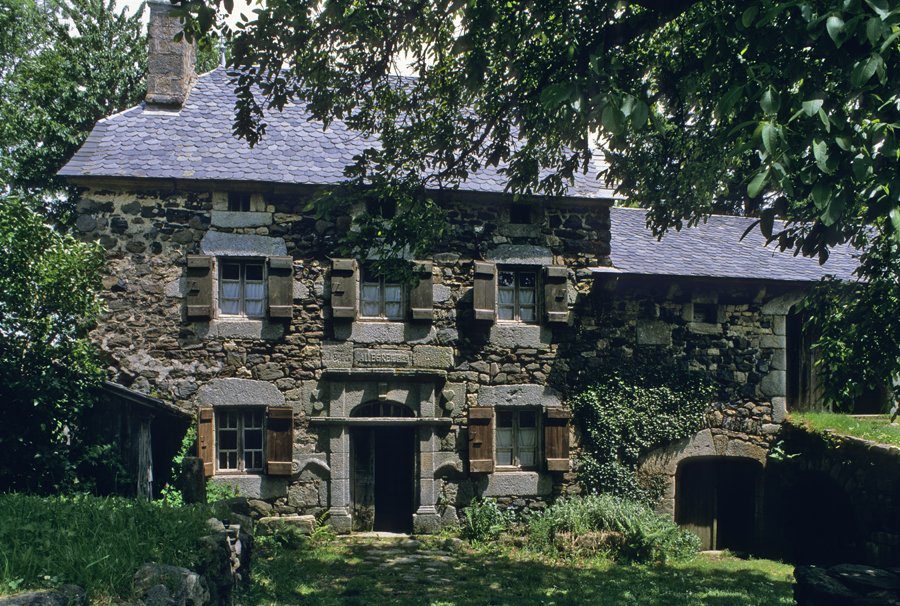
- The Allegre farm, in Loubaresse
- Location of Loubaresse
- Location within France Location within Auvergne-Rhône-Alpes
- Coordinates: 44°56′08″N 3°12′38″E
- Country: France
- Region: Auvergne-Rhône-Alpes
- Department: Cantal
- Arrondissement: Saint-Flour
- Canton: Neuvéglise
- Commune: Val-d'Arcomie
- Area^{1}: 28.24 km^{2} (10.90 sq mi)
- Elevation: 920 m (3,020 ft)
- Highest elevation: 996 m (3,268 ft)
- Lowest elevation: 726 m (2,382 ft)
- Population (2019): 427
  - Density: 15.1/km^{2} (39.2/sq mi)
- Time zone: UTC+01:00 (CET)
  - Summer (DST): UTC+02:00 (CEST)
- Postal code: 15320
- ^{1} French Land Register data, which excludes lakes, ponds, glaciers > 1 km^{2} (0.386 sq mi or 247 acres) and river estuaries.

Loubaresse (French pronunciation: [lubaʁɛs]; Auvergnat: Lobaressa) is a former municipality located in the Cantal department in Auvergne, southern France. On 1 January 2016, it was merged into the new commune Val-d'Arcomie.

== Population ==
Historical population
Year	Pop.	±% p.a.
1975	543	—
1982	443	−2.87%
1990	418	−0.72%
1999	434	+0.42%
2019	427	−0.08%
Source: EHESS and INSEE (2019)

== Geography ==
Municipality located in the Massif Central, in Margeride. It is one hour away from Clermont-Ferrand, and two hours away from Montpellier.

== History ==
In old French, Loubaresse means: village where wolves are crossing (corresponds to the Occitan word “lobaressa”, which means “wolves’ haunted place”.) The Chaliers “Lou Balax” ancient section is a part of Loubaresse, which can probably better explain the name's origin. The “Balax” means ditch, gorge, or ravine.

== Places and monuments ==
♦ Longevialle Castle, 17th century. Longevialle Castle was built around 1960 by Antoine Guerin Falcon de Longevialle, but it was probably inhabited from the 16th century. Until 1958, it was the fiefdom of the Falcon de Longevialle family. Over centuries, it was extended until he became the horseshoe-shaped building we know now, completed by two buildings which form an overhang on the principal line of the front of the castle. In 1958, because of the construction of the Grandval dam, the Longevialle family was expropriated, and those two buildings destroyed. So, some elements of decoration were removed with the owner's agreement. In 1961, the castle returned to the family because French national electricity company gave up the demolition of the principal building. Unfortunately, uninhabitable and isolated, it would be damaged by the years and the looters robbed the last paneling, and floorboards. In 1979, the Farmer's House (which will become the Margeride eco museum) managed by Guy Brun, offered to buy, restore and bring to life the castle. It received the prize “Masterpiece in danger” in 1980 for the restoration of the North wing and obtained a ranking in the Extra Inventory of Historical Monuments for the elevations, the roof, and the wonderful granite stairs. In 2000, the mixed federation Garabit-Grandval, the new owner, decided to sell the castle instead of setting up an important restoration campaign of the South wing of which roof was in danger of collapsing. Jean-Yves de Longevialle offered to buy the Castle in January 2001 and immediately took up the restoration program again. After the renovation of the frame and the roof, the owner is now looking for original pieces of decoration (Doors, paneling, chimneys) to restore the castle as it was in 1958, before the expropriation.

♦ The Garabit viaduct

♦ The Pierre Allegre farm, Margeride eco-museum

♦ The Pompignac dungeon

♦ The Torrette farm

== Personalities linked with the commune ==
♦ Bertrand Duguesclin

♦ Gustave Eiffel

♦ Henri-Georges Clouzot

== See also ==
- Communes of the Cantal department
