= Lavastrie =

- Part of Neuvéglise-sur-Truyère
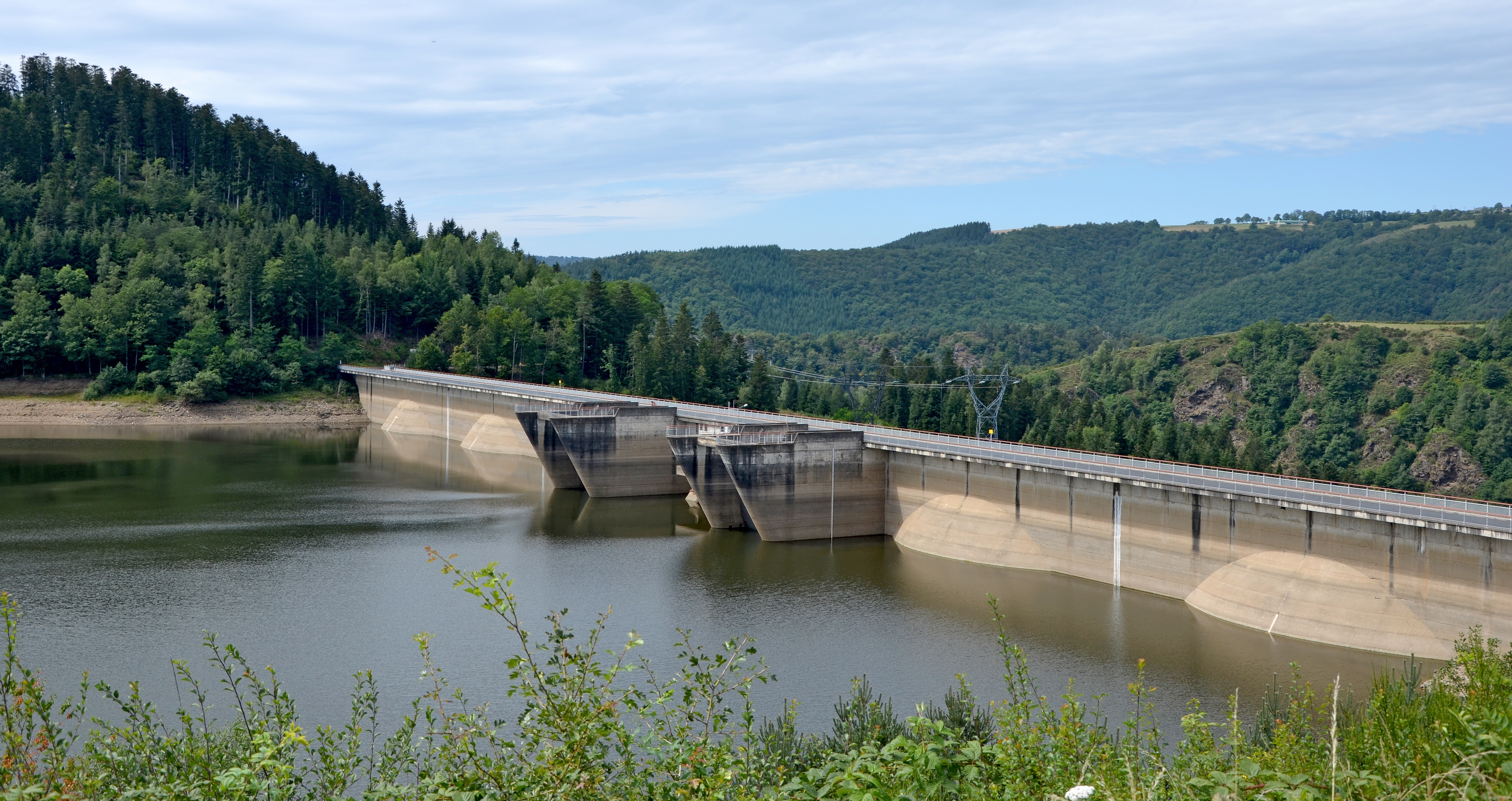
- The Grandval Dam, above Lavastrie
- Location of Lavastrie
- Location within France Location within Auvergne-Rhône-Alpes
- Coordinates: 44°56′10″N 3°02′35″E
- Country: France
- Region: Auvergne-Rhône-Alpes
- Department: Cantal
- Arrondissement: Saint-Flour
- Canton: Neuvéglise
- Commune: Neuvéglise-sur-Truyère
- Area^{1}: 24.14 km^{2} (9.32 sq mi)
- Elevation: 975 m (3,199 ft)
- Highest elevation: 1,042 m (3,419 ft)
- Lowest elevation: 660 m (2,170 ft)
- Population (2023): 255
  - Density: 10.6/km^{2} (27.4/sq mi)
- Time zone: UTC+01:00 (CET)
  - Summer (DST): UTC+02:00 (CEST)
- Postal code: 15260
- ^{1} French Land Register data, which excludes lakes, ponds, glaciers > 1 km^{2} (0.386 sq mi or 247 acres) and river estuaries.

Lavastrie (French pronunciation: [lavastʁi]; Auvergnat: La Vàstria) is a former commune in the Cantal department in south-central France. On 1 January 2017, it was merged into the new commune Neuvéglise-sur-Truyère.

== See also ==
- Lac de Grandval
- Communes of the Cantal department
