= Truyère =

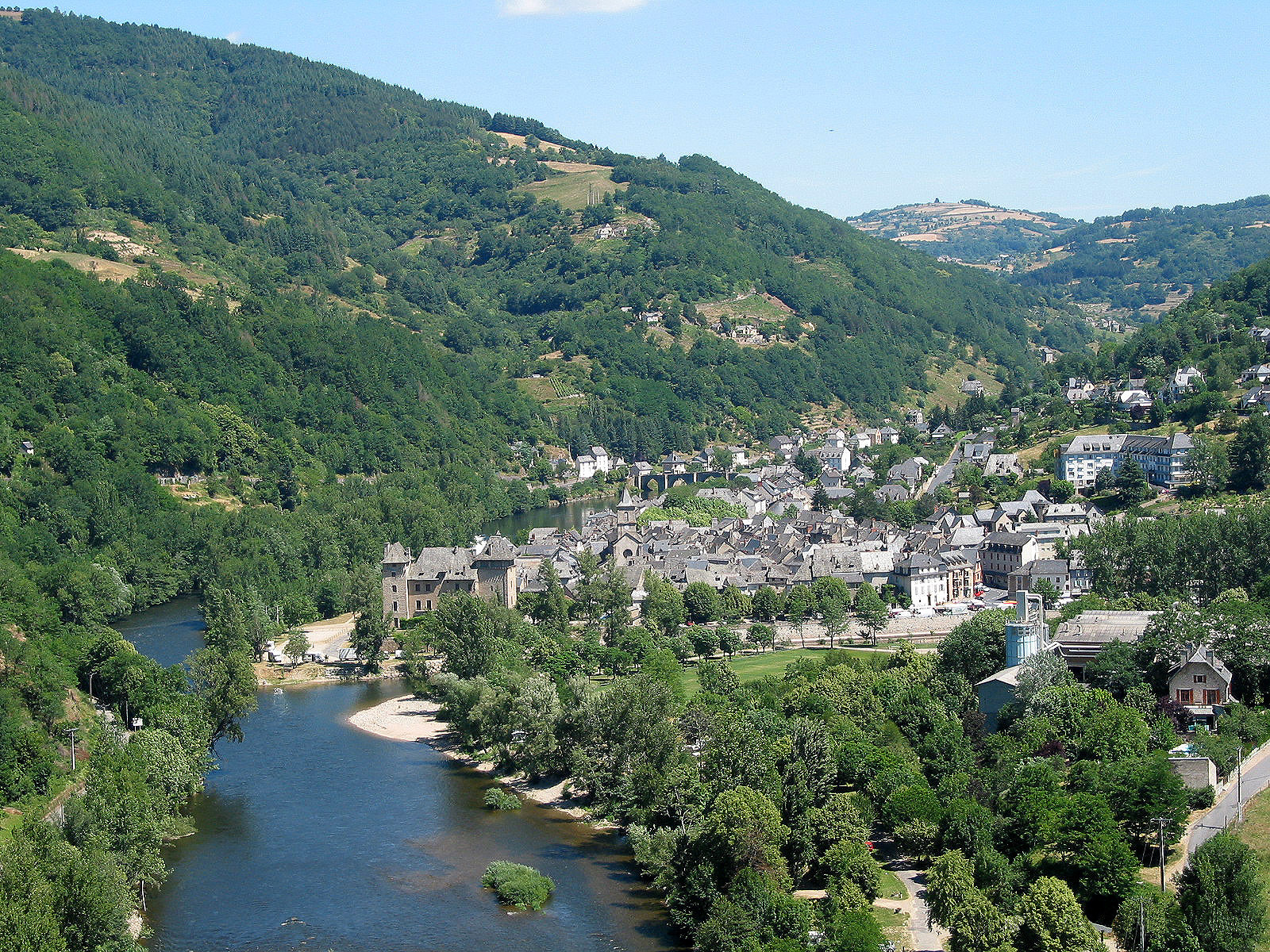
- The Truyère in Entraygues-sur-Truyère

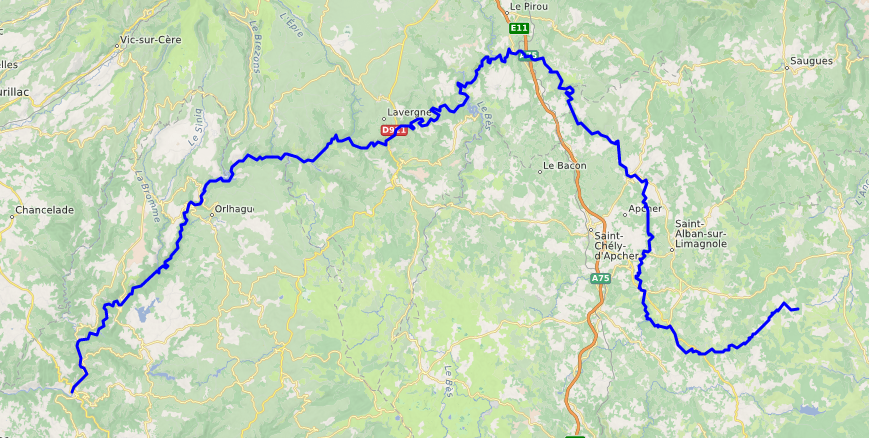

Location
- Country: France

Physical characteristics
- Source
  - location: Massif Central
  - elevation: 1,450 m (4,760 ft)
- Mouth
  - location: Lot
  - coordinates: 44°38′37″N 2°33′45″E
- Length: 167 km (104 mi)
- Basin size: 3,300 km^{2} (1,300 mi^{2})
- Discharge
  - average: 60 m^{3}/s (2,100 cu ft/s)

Basin features
- Progression: Lot→ Garonne→ Gironde estuary→ Atlantic Ocean
- Tributaries
  - left: Bès
  - right: Goul

The Truyère (French pronunciation: [tʁy.jɛːʁ]) is a 167-kilometre-long (104 mi) river in south-western France, right tributary of the Lot. Its source is in the south-western Massif Central, north of Mende. It flows generally west through the following départements and towns:

- Lozère: Le Malzieu-Ville
- Cantal
- Aveyron: Entraygues-sur-Truyère

The Truyère flows into the Lot in Entraygues-sur-Truyère. Its main tributaries are the Bès near Albaret-le-Comtal, the Goul near Saint-Hippolyte and the Selves near Campouriez.

The Truyère feeds several reservoirs, like the Lac de Grandval and the Lac de Barrage de Sarrans, to supply hydroelectricity.

The Garabit Viaduct, built by Gustave Eiffel, spans the Truyère near Ruynes-en-Margeride.

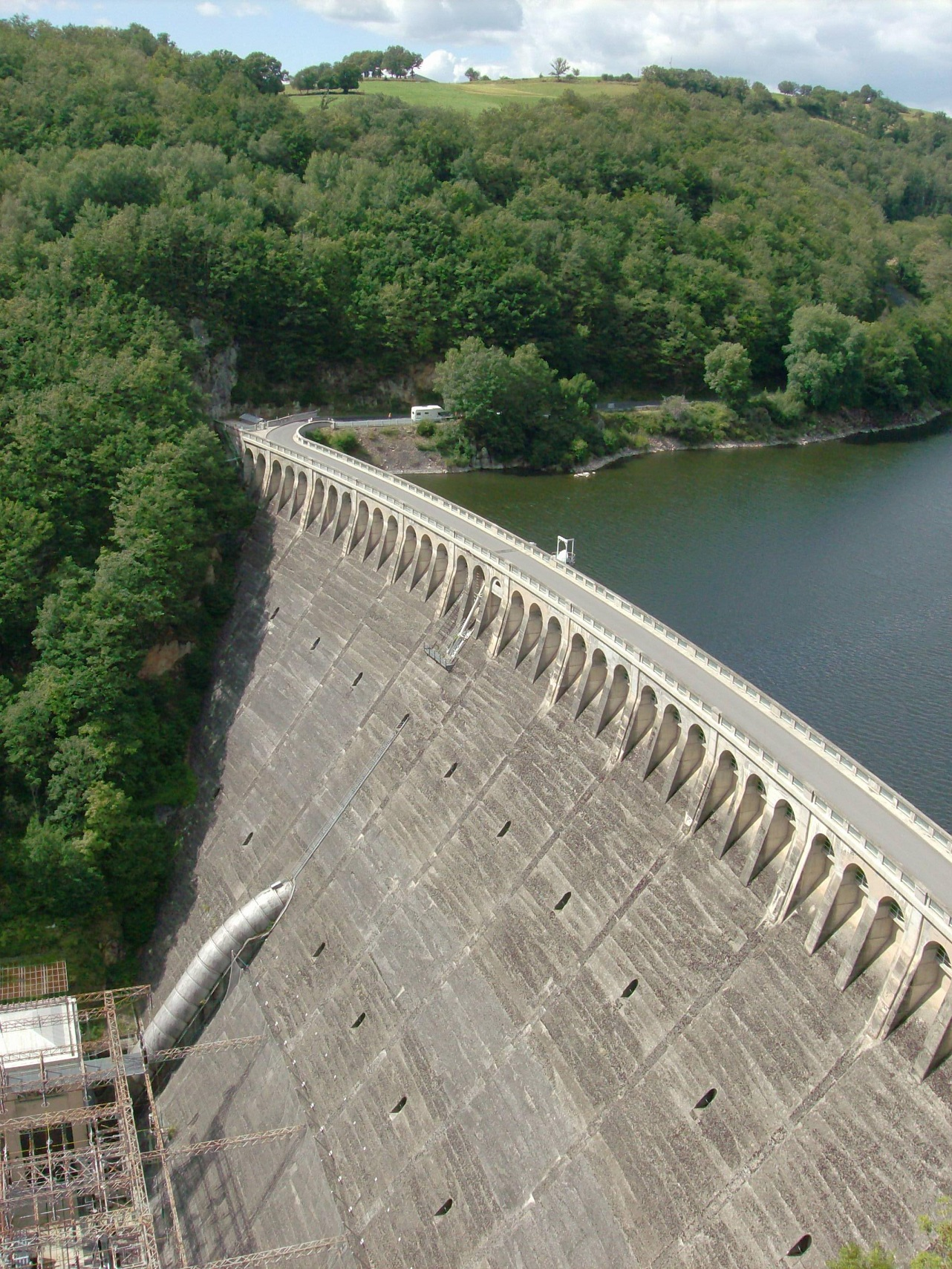
Sarrans hydroelectric dam

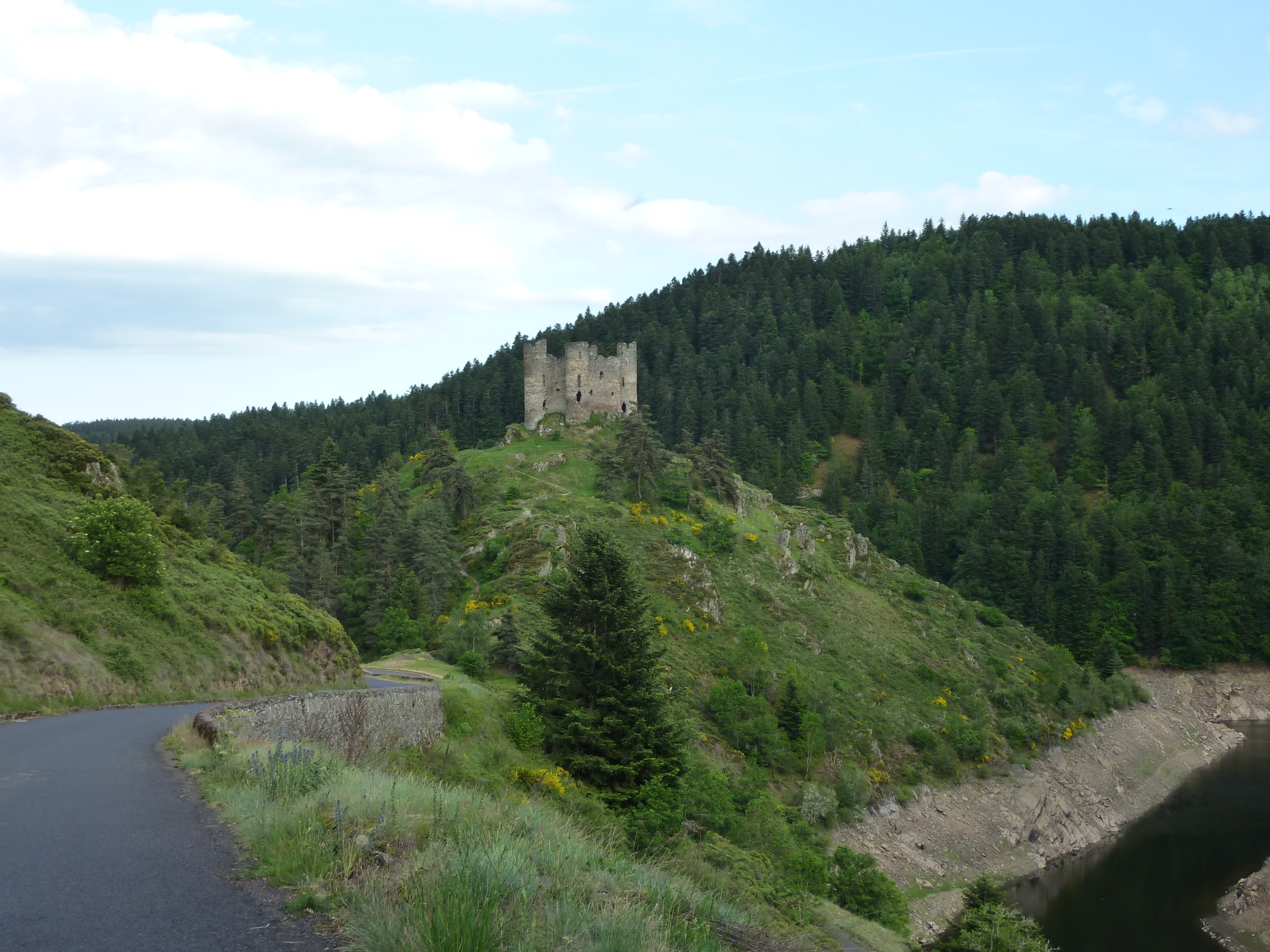
Truyère river and Château d'Alleuze

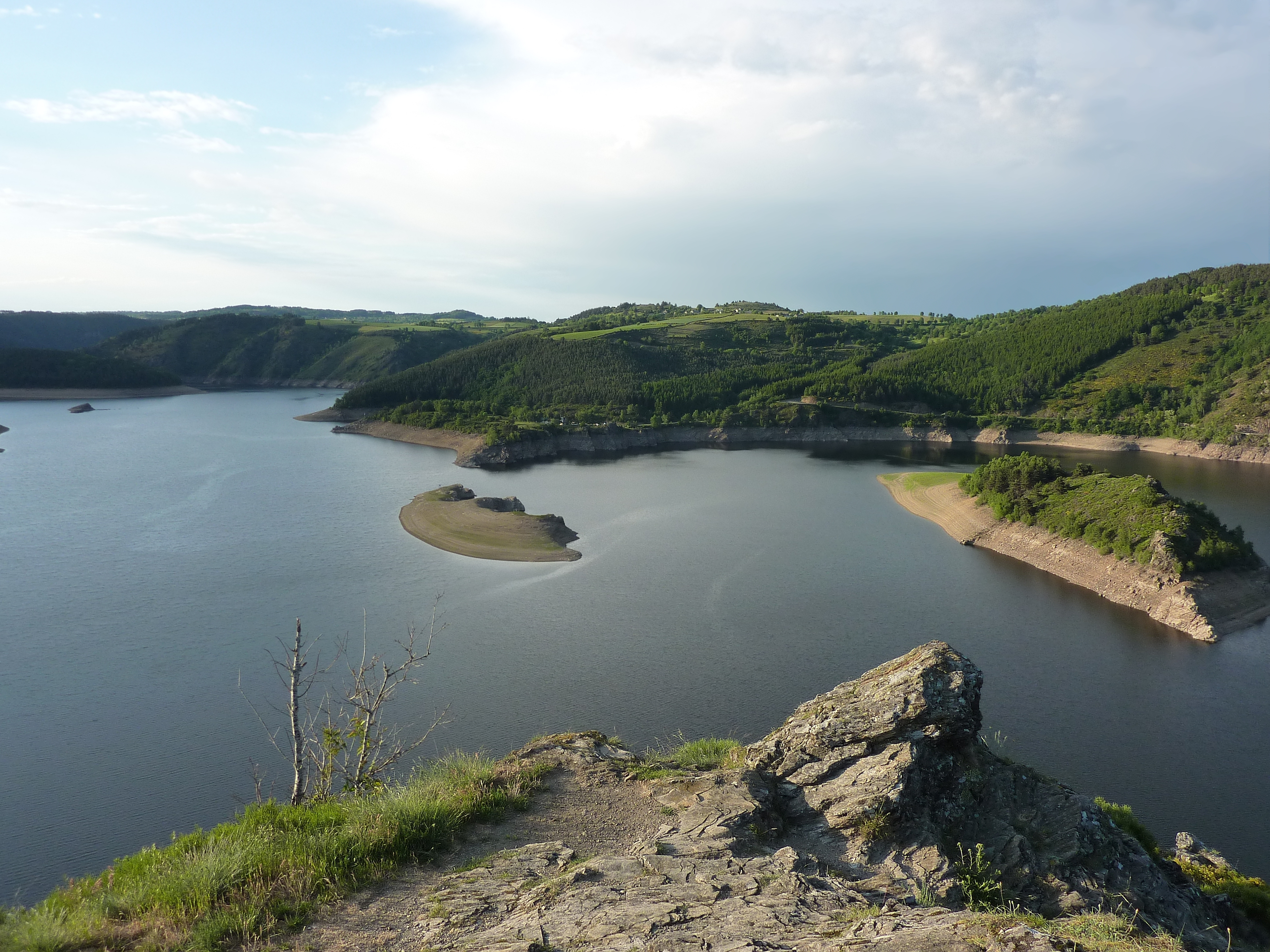
Truyère river at Lac de Grandval
