= Apchon =

Commune in Auvergne-Rhône-Alpes, France

- Commune
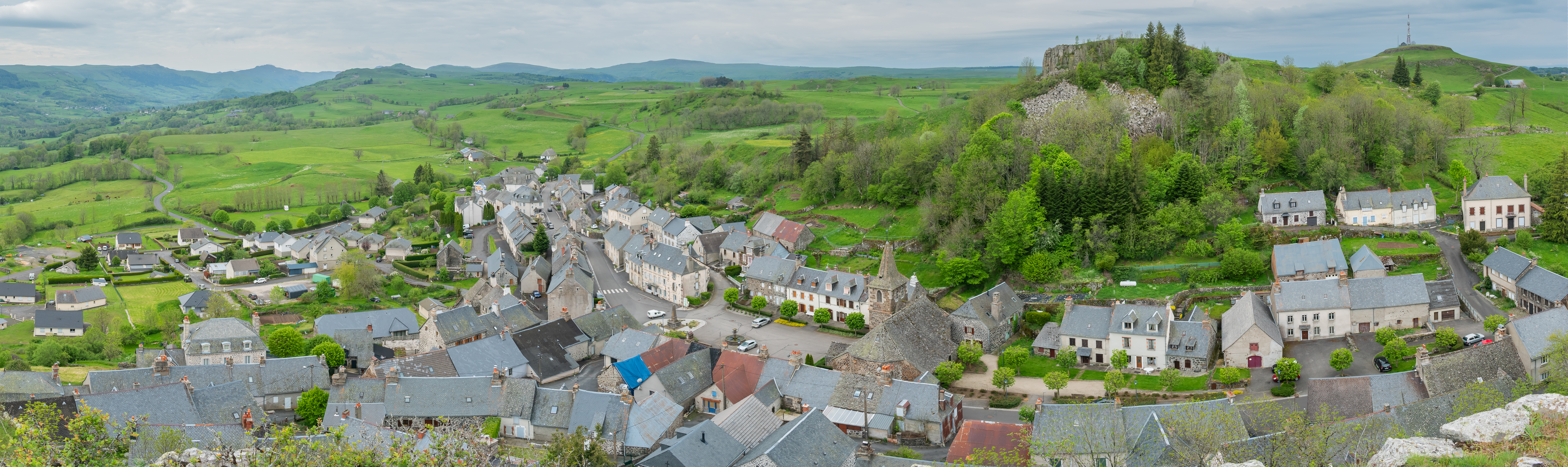
- A general view of Apchon, seen from the château

- Coat of arms
- Location of Apchon
- Location within France Location within Auvergne-Rhône-Alpes
- Coordinates: 45°15′00″N 2°41′41″E
- Country: France
- Region: Auvergne-Rhône-Alpes
- Department: Cantal
- Arrondissement: Mauriac
- Canton: Riom-ès-Montagnes
- Intercommunality: Pays Gentiane

Government
  - Mayor (2020–2026): Emeric Pouget
- Area^{1}: 12.43 km^{2} (4.80 sq mi)
- Elevation: 1,060 m (3,480 ft)
- Highest elevation: 1,143 m (3,750 ft)
- Lowest elevation: 833 m (2,733 ft)
- Population (2023): 177
  - Density: 14.2/km^{2} (36.9/sq mi)
- Time zone: UTC+01:00 (CET)
  - Summer (DST): UTC+02:00 (CEST)
- INSEE/Postal code: 15009 /15400
- ^{1} French Land Register data, which excludes lakes, ponds, glaciers > 1 km^{2} (0.386 sq mi or 247 acres) and river estuaries.

Apchon (French pronunciation: [apʃɔ̃]) is a commune in the Cantal department in the Auvergne region of south-central France.

== Geography ==
Apchon is located some 80 km south-west of Clermont-Ferrand, 25 km north-west of Murat, and 30 km south-east of Bort-les-Orgues. Access is by the D3 road from Riom-ès-Montagnes in the north-west passing through the north of the commune to Murat in the south-east. Access to the village is by the D49 which branches off the D3 north-east of the commune and passes through the village then south to Saint-Hippolyte. There is also the D249 from the village south-west to join the D263 south of Collandres. Apart from the village there are also the hamlets of La Ribeyre and La Vidal along the D3, and Brechailles on the north-east. Apart from some patches of forest in the north the commune is entirely farmland.

The Petite Rhue river flows from south to north through the commune and continues to join the Grande Rhue river at Coindre. The Ruisseau de Brechailles flows from the south-east to join the Petite Rhue north of the D3. The Ruisseau de Mazeyres rises in the south of the commune and flows into the Petite Rhue on the left bank. Several small streams rise in the west of the commune and flow north-west eventually joining and flowing into the Veronne.

=== Heraldry ===
Arms of Apchon	The official status of the blazon remains to be determined. Blazon: Sable, a cross of Or cantoned at 1 and 2 with a roundel the same; at 3 a battle-axe contourned Argent; at 4 a monk bald and bearded in Argent.

== Administration ==
List of successive mayors

From	To	Name
2001	2020	Pierre Pouget
2020	2026	Emeric Pouget

== Population ==
The inhabitants of the commune are known as Apchonnais or Apchonnaises in French.

Historical population
Year	Pop.	±% p.a.
1968	455	—
1975	352	−3.60%
1982	313	−1.66%
1990	257	−2.43%
1999	242	−0.67%
2007	207	−1.93%
2012	205	−0.19%
2017	186	−1.93%
2023	177	−0.82%
Source: INSEE

== Sites and monuments ==
The Château fort d'Apchon (12th century) is registered as an historical monument.

The Church contains several items that are registered as historical objects:

- An Altar, Retable, and Statue (17th century)
- An Altar, Retable, 2 Statues, and a Bust-Reliquary (17th century)
- An Altar, Retable, and 2 Group Sculptures (17th century)
- A Statue: Virgin and child (15th century)
- A Retable in the main Altar (18th century)
- 2 Sarcophagii (11th century)

=== Views of Apchon ===
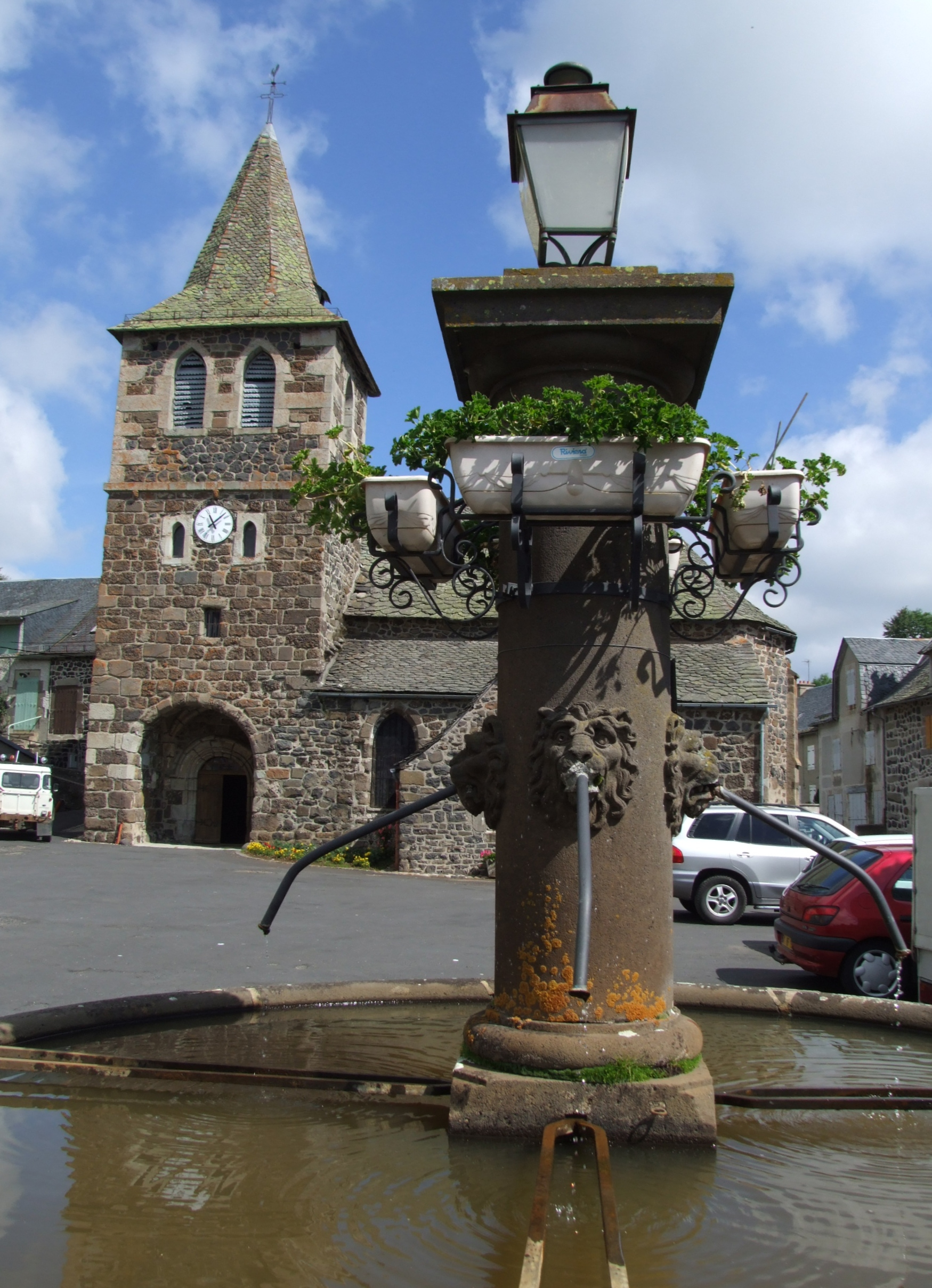
Parish church

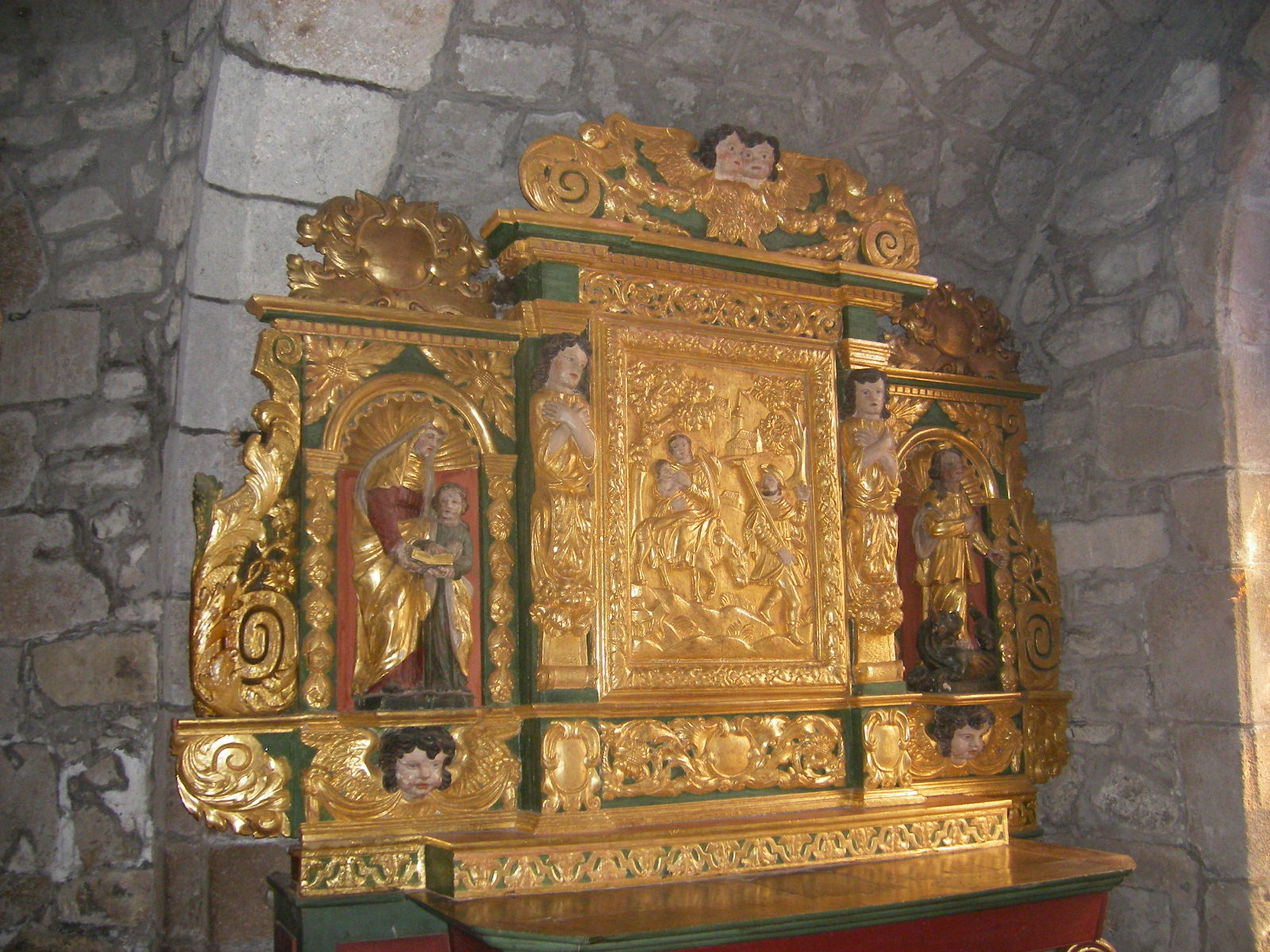
Church interior

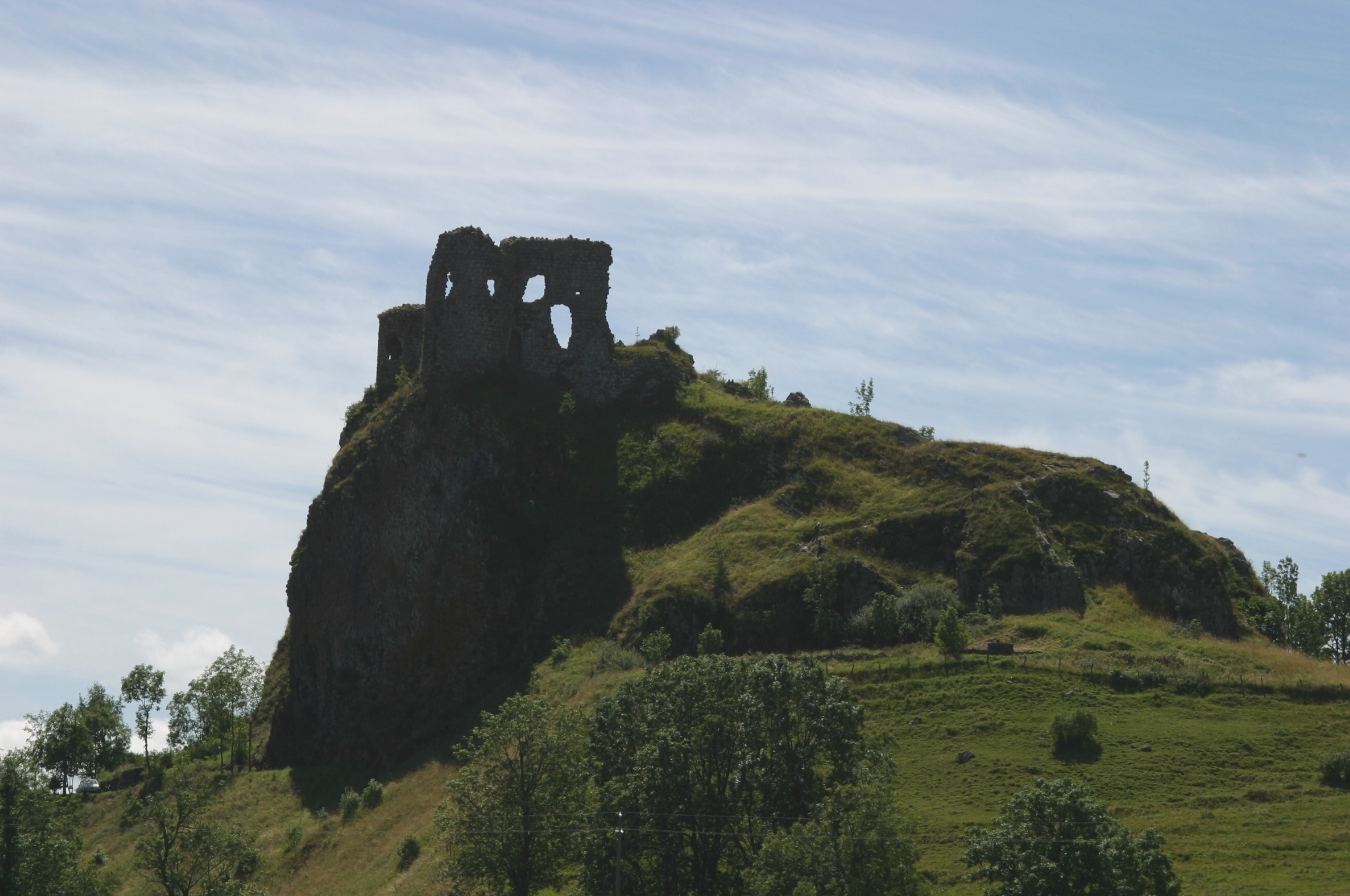
Ruins of the castle (built between 1408 and 1422)

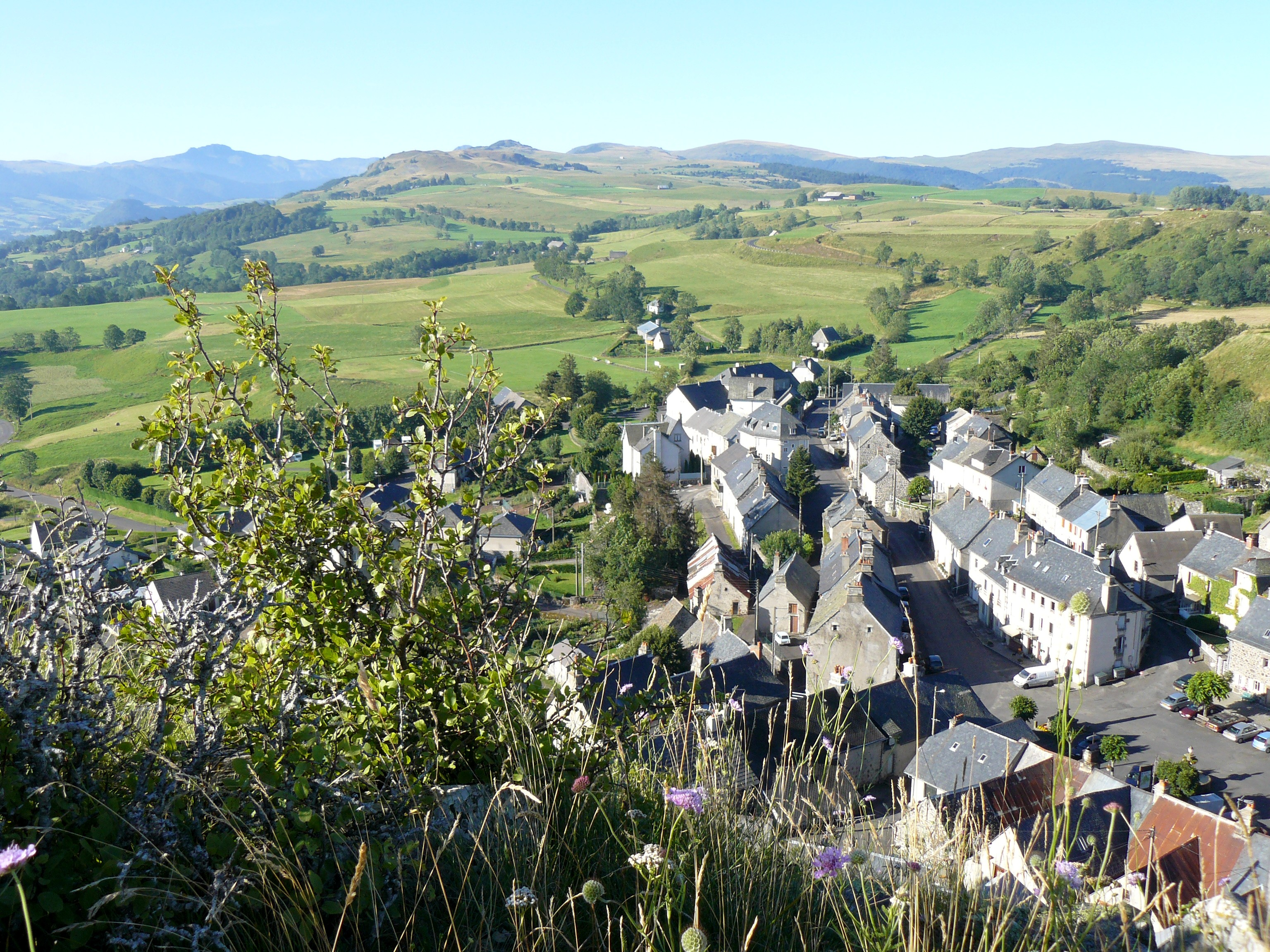
View of the village from the castle

== See also ==
- Communes of the Cantal department
