= Riom-ès-Montagnes =

Commune in Auvergne-Rhône-Alpes, France

- Commune
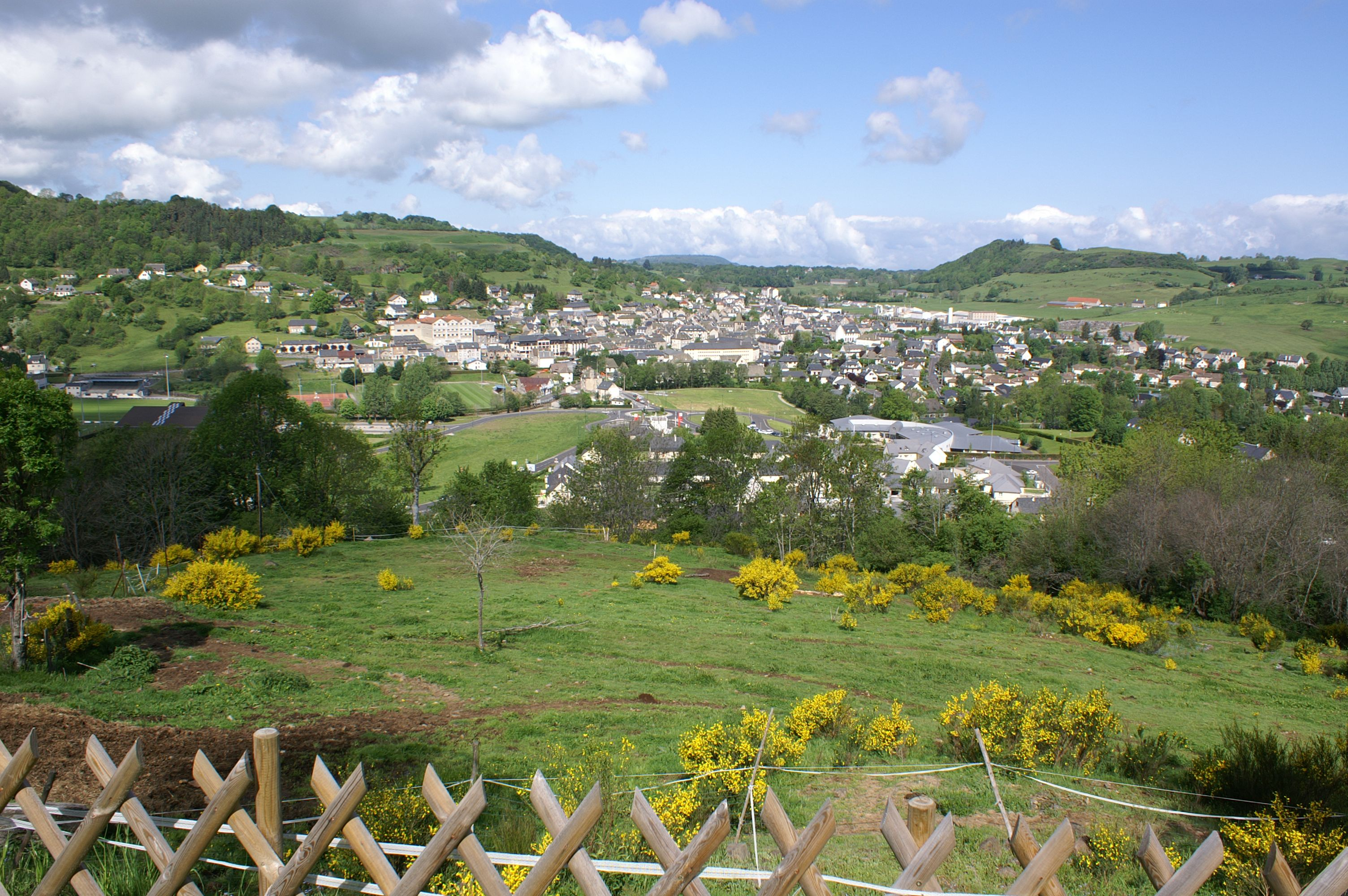
- A general view of Riom-ès-Montagnes

- Coat of arms
- Location of Riom-ès-Montagnes
- Location within France Location within Auvergne-Rhône-Alpes
- Coordinates: 45°16′59″N 2°39′38″E
- Country: France
- Region: Auvergne-Rhône-Alpes
- Department: Cantal
- Arrondissement: Mauriac
- Canton: Riom-ès-Montagnes
- Intercommunality: Pays Gentiane

Government
  - Mayor (2020–2026): François Boisset
- Area^{1}: 46.48 km^{2} (17.95 sq mi)
- Elevation: 840 m (2,760 ft)
- Highest elevation: 1,102 m (3,615 ft)
- Lowest elevation: 575 m (1,886 ft)
- Population (2023): 2,405
  - Density: 51.74/km^{2} (134.0/sq mi)
- Time zone: UTC+01:00 (CET)
  - Summer (DST): UTC+02:00 (CEST)
- INSEE/Postal code: 15162 /15400
- ^{1} French Land Register data, which excludes lakes, ponds, glaciers > 1 km^{2} (0.386 sq mi or 247 acres) and river estuaries.

Riom-ès-Montagnes (French pronunciation: [ʁjɔ̃ ɛs mɔ̃taɲ]; Occitan: Riòm de las Montanhas) is a commune in the department of Cantal, and the region of Auvergne-Rhône-Alpes, south-central France.

== Geography ==
=== Location ===
Main town of the "Pays Gentiane", the city is located northwest of the department of Cantal, in the heart of the regional natural park of Auvergne Volcanoes. Riom-ès-Montagnes is located between the Monts Dore and the Mounts of Cantal at an altitude of 840 meters. The name Riom is also used for a town away from the mountains in the Puy-de-Dome department in the Auvergne.The Riom name for the two towns goes back at least to Roman times - "Ricomagus" for Riom and "Rigomagus" for Riom-ḕs-Montagnes.

=== Hydrography ===
The Véronne river crosses Riom-ès-Montagnes. It flows into Petite Rhue, which marks the boundary between Riom-ès-Montagnes and the neighboring towns of Marchastel and Saint-Amandin.

The dam of Journiac is partly on the town, on the Petite Rhue at the limit with Saint-Amandin.

Other rivers crisscross the town as the brook of Grolle, the brook of Cheylat, the Soulou...

=== Climate ===
The climate is a mountain climate where there is a frequent presence of frost and snow in winter and in the summer days can be hot and sunny followed by cooler nights. Spring and autumn are characterized by an abundance of rainy days and the frequent presence of fog.

On average, Riom-ès-Montagnes experiences 110.3 days per year with a minimum temperature below 0 °C (32.0 °F), 6.3 days per year with a minimum temperature below −10 °C (14.0 °F), 7.7 days per year with a maximum temperature below 0 °C (32.0 °F), and 16.3 days per year with a maximum temperature above 30 °C (86.0 °F). The record high temperature was 39.9 °C (103.8 °F) on June 18, 2026, while the record low temperature was −19.0 °C (−2.2 °F) on February 5, 2012.

Climate data for Riom-ès-Montagnes (1991–2020 normals, extremes 2006–present)
Month	Jan	Feb	Mar	Apr	May	Jun	Jul	Aug	Sep	Oct	Nov	Dec	Year
Record high °C (°F)	19.8 (67.6)	24.5 (76.1)	25.0 (77.0)	26.5 (79.7)	32.0 (89.6)	39.9 (103.8)	38.5 (101.3)	38.0 (100.4)	33.9 (93.0)	30.3 (86.5)	26.0 (78.8)	20.1 (68.2)	39.9 (103.8)
Mean daily maximum °C (°F)	6.3 (43.3)	7.5 (45.5)	10.8 (51.4)	15.2 (59.4)	17.9 (64.2)	22.5 (72.5)	25.5 (77.9)	24.2 (75.6)	20.7 (69.3)	16.4 (61.5)	10.6 (51.1)	7.5 (45.5)	15.4 (59.8)
Daily mean °C (°F)	2.0 (35.6)	2.4 (36.3)	5.3 (41.5)	8.9 (48.0)	11.9 (53.4)	16.0 (60.8)	18.5 (65.3)	17.2 (63.0)	14.1 (57.4)	10.7 (51.3)	6.0 (42.8)	3.0 (37.4)	9.7 (49.4)
Mean daily minimum °C (°F)	−2.3 (27.9)	−2.8 (27.0)	−0.2 (31.6)	2.7 (36.9)	5.9 (42.6)	9.5 (49.1)	11.5 (52.7)	10.2 (50.4)	7.4 (45.3)	5.1 (41.2)	1.4 (34.5)	−1.4 (29.5)	3.9 (39.1)
Record low °C (°F)	−16.0 (3.2)	−19.0 (−2.2)	−11.5 (11.3)	−8.0 (17.6)	−3.5 (25.7)	1.0 (33.8)	3.0 (37.4)	2.0 (35.6)	−1.5 (29.3)	−8.0 (17.6)	−12.0 (10.4)	−18.5 (−1.3)	−19.0 (−2.2)
Average precipitation mm (inches)	99.7 (3.93)	90.2 (3.55)	87.5 (3.44)	108.6 (4.28)	113.0 (4.45)	89.5 (3.52)	85.3 (3.36)	92.5 (3.64)	102.5 (4.04)	108.1 (4.26)	125.1 (4.93)	119.4 (4.70)	1,221.4 (48.1)
Average precipitation days (≥ 1.0 mm)	13.1	11.9	11.3	12.4	12.7	10.4	9.3	9.3	9.5	11.6	13.6	13.7	138.8
Source: Meteociel

=== Transports ===
Once very used, rail transport is still active thanks to the Gentian express, touristic train that circulates in Haute-Auvergne, stops in Riom-ès-Montagnes station and partially takes the old line of Bort-les-Orgues to Neussargues. This line was inaugurated on July 5, 1908.

Louis Bonnet, creator of the "Auvergnat de Paris" was a forerunner in what is nowadays called "organized trips". In 1904, he created the trains that bear his name. Until 1939, they drove, at a reduced price, every spring and summer, compatriots in the country. A special atmosphere prevails in these wagons, as it should be between Auvergnats: Cabrette and snack, Bourrée on the platform at each stop. These trips will pass to Riom-ès-Montagnes in 1923.

Two axes intersect in the city, the axis Mauriac / Condat and the axis Bort-les-Orgues / Murat / Saint-Flour.

The national road 678 which went from Laguenne to La Sauvetat, through Mauriac, Riom-ès-Montagnes and Condat is downgraded to "departmental road 678" on the department of Cantal.

== Toponymy ==
The name originates from Gallic “rigomagos” meaning the king's market. From the Gallic word Rix or rig, the local "king", the one who probably perceived the market rights, accompanied by the Gallic word magos. The Gallic word “magos” first designated a field, then a fairground, a market and finally the village or city that develops around this market.

== History ==
Its creation dates back to the ancient Gallo-Roman era as evidenced by the very name of the city, the Gaulish "rigomagos" meaning the king's market.

- • February 1790: the Arbres and Châteauneuf are erected in common but are attached to Riom in 1836
- • 1836: the municipality of Riom changes its name to Riom-ès-Montagnes.
- • June 7, 1908: electrification of the town by Mr. Gratacap, engineer at Maurs
- • May 26, 1912: First tourist guide of the city
- • February 1920: creation of an initiative syndicate
- • 1924: revival of fairs thanks to the railway. The most famous is that of St. Michael.
- • 1925: industrial production of Auvergne Gentiane by Émile Refouvelet, ancestor of the Avèze.
- • 1938: the extension of the city causes problems of water supply and makes it necessary to give names to the streets.
- • May 30, 1970: creation of the Haut Cantal clinic. Currently rest home and postoperative care.
- • 1998: Creation of the Geneviève Champsaur center (reception of patients suffering from multiple sclerosis)
- • 2006: creation of a home and care facility for Alzheimer's
- • 2009: creation of a functional rehabilitation center for the rehabilitation of respiratory patients.

== Population and Society ==
=== Demography ===
Historical population
Year	Pop.	±% p.a.
1968	3,527	—
1975	3,624	+0.39%
1982	3,417	−0.84%
1990	3,225	−0.72%
1999	2,842	−1.39%
2007	2,761	−0.36%
2012	2,763	+0.01%
2017	2,513	−1.88%
2023	2,405	−0.73%
Source: INSEE

=== Cultural events and celebrations ===
Cultural Manifesations:

• Rally Gentiane, May

• Green Axis Festival, May

• Patronal Feast, 3rd weekend of June

• Festival Between Heaven and Earth, July

• Feast of gentian, July

• Book Fair, August

• Fête de la Rosière, weekend of August 15

• Festival of Bleu d'Auvergne, penultimate weekend of August

• Mycological days in Haute-Auvergne, October

• Christmas market, December

The Community of Communes of the Gentian Country, the Cultural Office of the Gentian Country, the Tourist Office of the Pays Gentiane, the municipal library and the community in general also organize several cultural events from September to June (concerts, theater, dance, exhibitions, sports competitions ...).

== Economy ==
The service sector employed 1335 people in 2012. Healthcare is the biggest employment sector (around 450 people). The town accounts above 100 merchants and artisans and the central administration employs around 100 people as well (Post office, Public Finance...)

=== Agriculture ===
Riom has about fifty farmers. Cattle breeding of the local Salers breed plays an important role.

=== Agri-food Sector ===
The production of Cantal and Bleu d'Auvergne is the main activity of the agri-food sector. The Riom Cheese Company is the leading company in this field which employs 180 people. More than half of Bleu d'Auvergne's production comes from Riom. The first dairy was opened in 1900 by Charles Seroude and from 1949 to 1958, The Laughing Cow will be manufactured there. The plant has about 1,000 farmers in the CFCU.

A brand of Gentiana Liquor, Avèze is produced locally and employs a few people.

Chemviron, has one of the three diatomite processing sites in France in Riom. This one is extracted from a quarry located on the territory of the commune of Virargues. The company of diatomites was created in 1923. In 1949, new development of this plant with its purchase by the ECSC. The company employs around fifty people in Riom.

== See also ==
- Communes of the Cantal department
