= Chateau de Tautal Bas =

Manor house in Auvergne, France

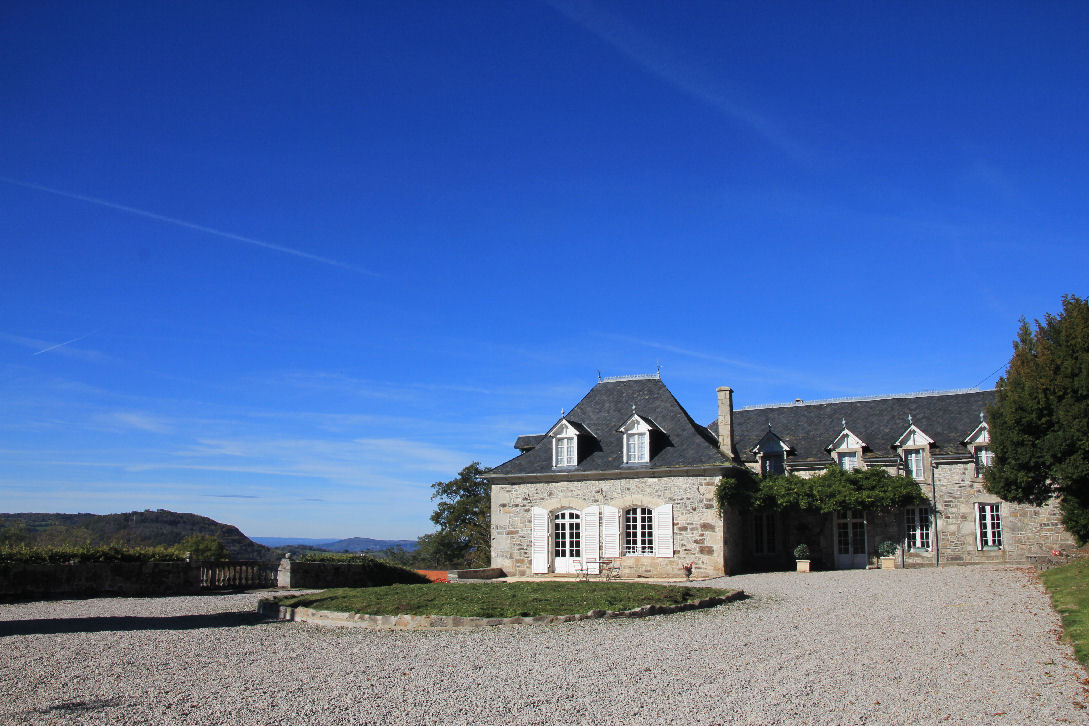
South Facade Tautal-Bas

Château de Tautal-Bas is a manor house in south-central France, in the department of Cantal, in the region of Auvergne. It was known also as Tautal-Soutro, its Occitan name, and in its vicinity another chateau can be found, Chateau de Tautal-Haut, formerly known as Tautal-Soubro. In medieval times, the area was likely the fief of a family known as Tautail, whose foundation could date back to the early 14th century (see references). The chateau is situated at an altitude of 850 metres, within the community of Valette, but it has stronger historical ties with the older village of Menet, which lies not far from the foot of the hill on which Tautal-Bas is built. Menet has a Romanesque style church, Église Saint-Pierre de Menet dated to the 12th century. The main house consists of several parts which differ in age, the front (South) part being the oldest, possibly 16th century, and the middle- and back (North) most likely younger. The house retains a significant part of its historical grounds, which - within their current perimeter - measure approximately 47 hectares or 117 acres. The grounds are bordered by the streams La Sumene to the West and Le Cheylat to the North of the house.
