= Le Vaulmier =

Commune in Auvergne-Rhône-Alpes, France

- Commune
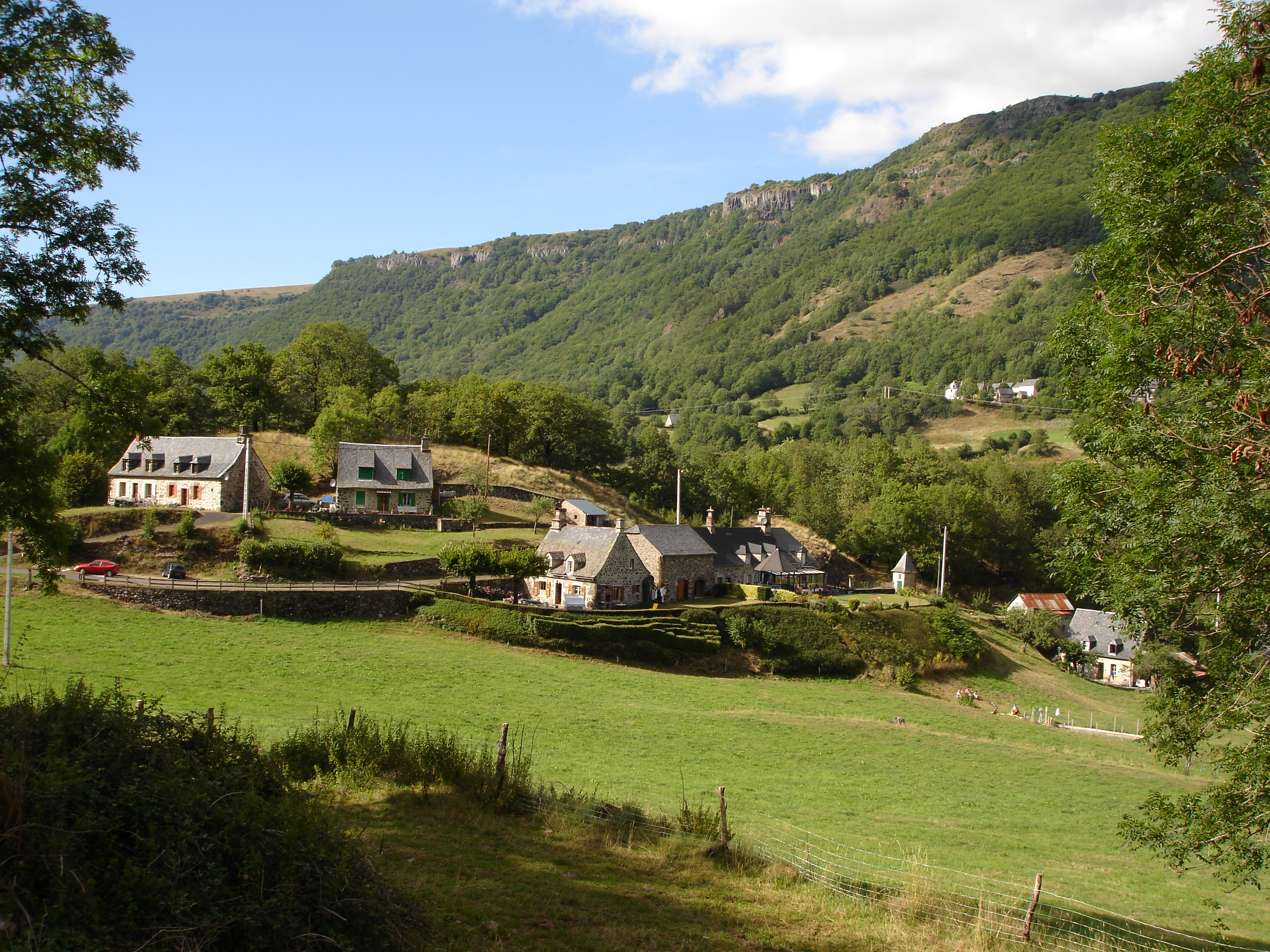
- The hamlet of Outre, in Vaulmier
- Location of Le Vaulmier
- Location within France Location within Auvergne-Rhône-Alpes
- Coordinates: 45°11′24″N 2°34′02″E
- Country: France
- Region: Auvergne-Rhône-Alpes
- Department: Cantal
- Arrondissement: Mauriac
- Canton: Riom-ès-Montagnes
- Intercommunality: Pays de Salers

Government
  - Mayor (2020–2026): Christian Fournier
- Area^{1}: 17.51 km^{2} (6.76 sq mi)
- Elevation: 840 m (2,760 ft)
- Highest elevation: 1,510 m (4,950 ft)
- Lowest elevation: 710 m (2,330 ft)
- Population (2023): 60
  - Density: 3.4/km^{2} (8.9/sq mi)
- Time zone: UTC+01:00 (CET)
  - Summer (DST): UTC+02:00 (CEST)
- INSEE/Postal code: 15249 /15380
- ^{1} French Land Register data, which excludes lakes, ponds, glaciers > 1 km^{2} (0.386 sq mi or 247 acres) and river estuaries.

Le Vaulmier (French pronunciation: [lə volmje]) is a commune in the Cantal department in south-central France.

== Population ==
Historical population
Year	Pop.	±% p.a.
1968	209	—
1975	158	−3.92%
1982	148	−0.93%
1990	114	−3.21%
1999	87	−2.96%
2007	85	−0.29%
2012	67	−4.65%
2017	71	+1.17%
2023	60	−2.77%
Source: INSEE

== See also ==
- Communes of the Cantal department
