= Trizac =

Commune in Auvergne-Rhône-Alpes, France

- Commune
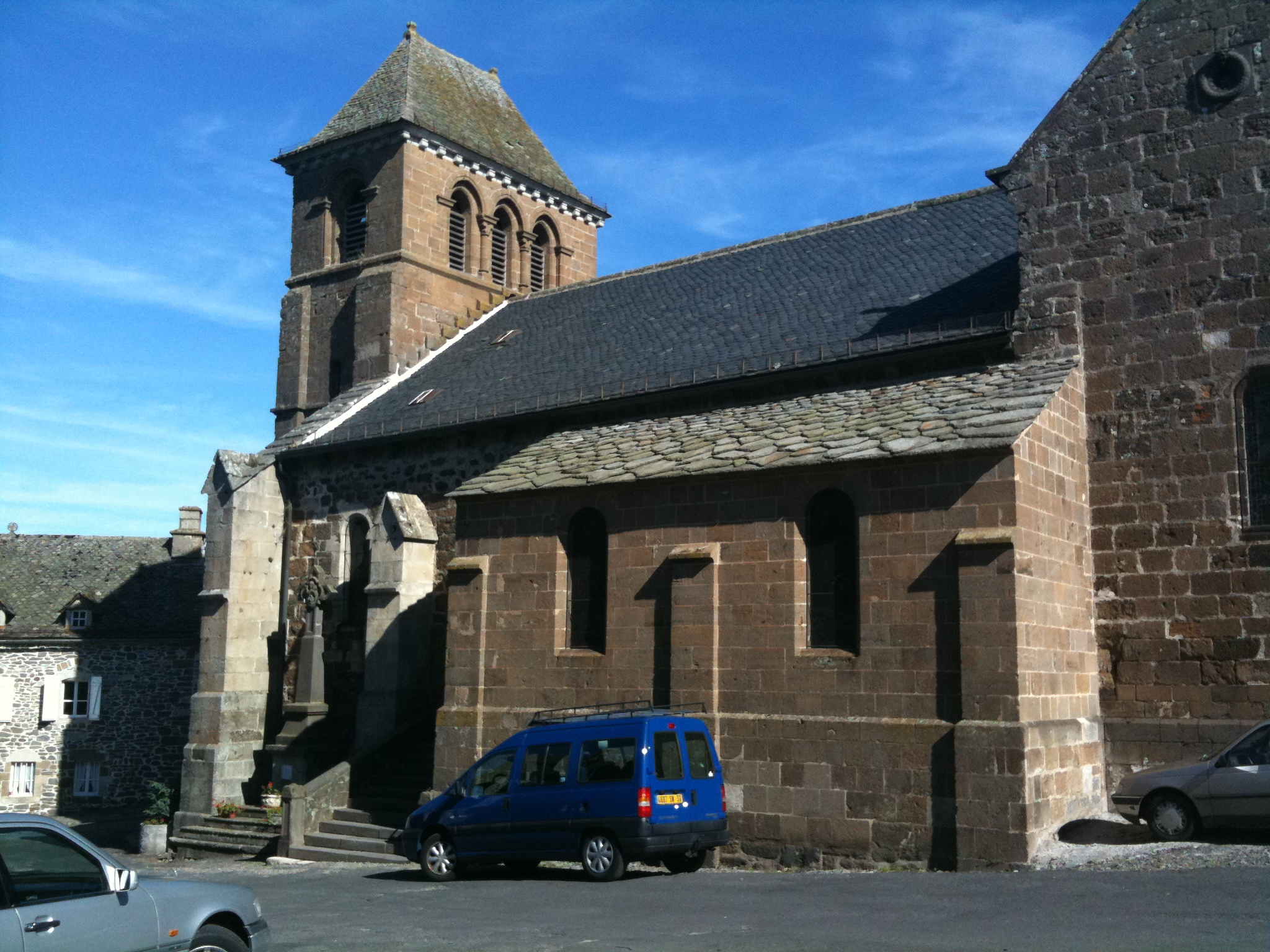
- The church in Trizac
- Location of Trizac
- Location within France Location within Auvergne-Rhône-Alpes
- Coordinates: 45°15′14″N 2°32′22″E
- Country: France
- Region: Auvergne-Rhône-Alpes
- Department: Cantal
- Arrondissement: Mauriac
- Canton: Riom-ès-Montagnes
- Intercommunality: Pays Gentiane

Government
  - Mayor (2020–2026): Louis Toty
- Area^{1}: 44.9 km^{2} (17.3 sq mi)
- Elevation: 960 m (3,150 ft)
- Highest elevation: 1,264 m (4,147 ft)
- Lowest elevation: 625 m (2,051 ft)
- Population (2023): 446
  - Density: 9.93/km^{2} (25.7/sq mi)
- Time zone: UTC+01:00 (CET)
  - Summer (DST): UTC+02:00 (CEST)
- INSEE/Postal code: 15243 /15400
- ^{1} French Land Register data, which excludes lakes, ponds, glaciers > 1 km^{2} (0.386 sq mi or 247 acres) and river estuaries.

Trizac (French pronunciation: [tʁizak]; Occitan: Trisac) is a commune in the Cantal department in south-central France.

== Population ==
Historical population
Year	Pop.	±% p.a.
1968	1,221	—
1975	1,070	−1.87%
1982	921	−2.12%
1990	754	−2.47%
1999	657	−1.52%
2007	576	−1.63%
2012	514	−2.25%
2017	513	−0.04%
2023	446	−2.31%
Source: INSEE

== See also ==
- Communes of the Cantal department
