= Lugarde =

Commune in Auvergne-Rhône-Alpes, France

- Commune
- Location of Lugarde
- Location within France Location within Auvergne-Rhône-Alpes
- Coordinates: 45°17′19″N 2°45′41″E
- Country: France
- Region: Auvergne-Rhône-Alpes
- Department: Cantal
- Arrondissement: Saint-Flour
- Canton: Riom-ès-Montagnes

Government
  - Mayor (2020–2026): Daniele Mandon
- Area^{1}: 13.43 km^{2} (5.19 sq mi)
- Elevation: 1,017 m (3,337 ft)
- Highest elevation: 1,165 m (3,822 ft)
- Lowest elevation: 753 m (2,470 ft)
- Population (2023): 117
  - Density: 8.71/km^{2} (22.6/sq mi)
- Time zone: UTC+01:00 (CET)
  - Summer (DST): UTC+02:00 (CEST)
- INSEE/Postal code: 15110 /15190
- ^{1} French Land Register data, which excludes lakes, ponds, glaciers > 1 km^{2} (0.386 sq mi or 247 acres) and river estuaries.

Lugarde (French pronunciation: [lyɡaʁd]; Occitan: Lugarda) is a commune in the Cantal department in south-central France.

== Population ==
Historical population
Year	Pop.	±% p.a.
1968	512	—
1975	379	−4.21%
1982	333	−1.83%
1990	219	−5.10%
1999	166	−3.03%
2007	163	−0.23%
2012	159	−0.50%
2017	145	−1.83%
2023	117	−3.51%
Source: INSEE

== See also ==
- Communes of the Cantal department
