= Montgreleix =

Commune in Auvergne-Rhône-Alpes, France

- Commune
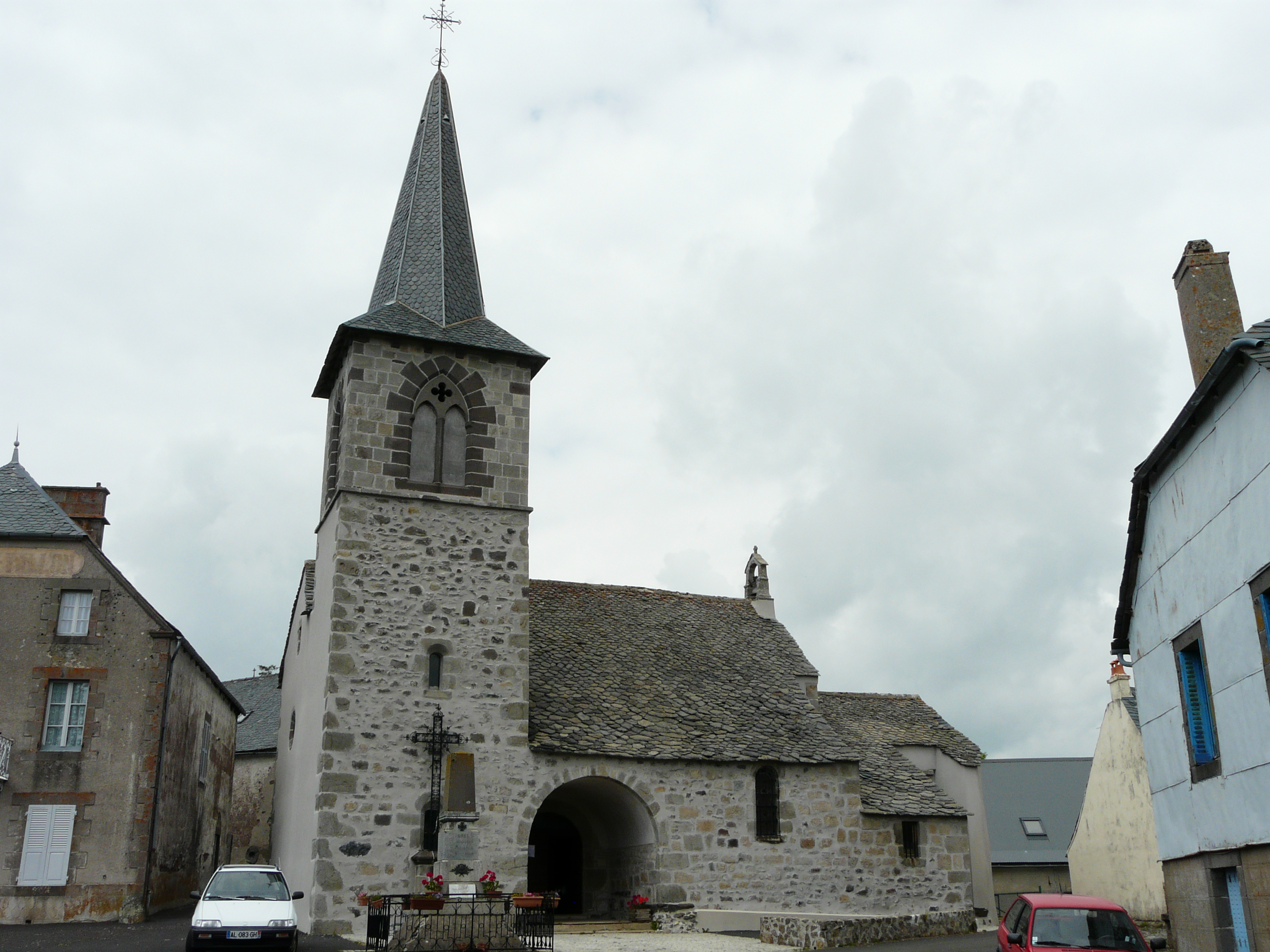
- The church of Saint-Laurent, in Montgreleix
- Location of Montgreleix
- Location within France Location within Auvergne-Rhône-Alpes
- Coordinates: 45°20′44″N 2°52′15″E
- Country: France
- Region: Auvergne-Rhône-Alpes
- Department: Cantal
- Arrondissement: Saint-Flour
- Canton: Riom-ès-Montagnes

Government
  - Mayor (2020–2026): Jean Mage
- Area^{1}: 17.63 km^{2} (6.81 sq mi)
- Elevation: 1,238 m (4,062 ft)
- Highest elevation: 1,426 m (4,678 ft)
- Lowest elevation: 1,036 m (3,399 ft)
- Population (2023): 31
  - Density: 1.8/km^{2} (4.6/sq mi)
- Time zone: UTC+01:00 (CET)
  - Summer (DST): UTC+02:00 (CEST)
- INSEE/Postal code: 15132 /15190
- ^{1} French Land Register data, which excludes lakes, ponds, glaciers > 1 km^{2} (0.386 sq mi or 247 acres) and river estuaries.

Montgreleix is a commune in the Cantal department in south-central France.

== Population ==
Historical population
Year	Pop.	±% p.a.
1968	116	—
1975	113	−0.37%
1982	91	−3.05%
1990	57	−5.68%
1999	67	+1.81%
2007	56	−2.22%
2012	38	−7.46%
2017	44	+2.98%
2023	31	−5.67%
Source: INSEE

== See also ==
- Communes of the Cantal department
