= Saint-Bonnet-de-Condat =

Commune in Auvergne-Rhône-Alpes, France

- Commune
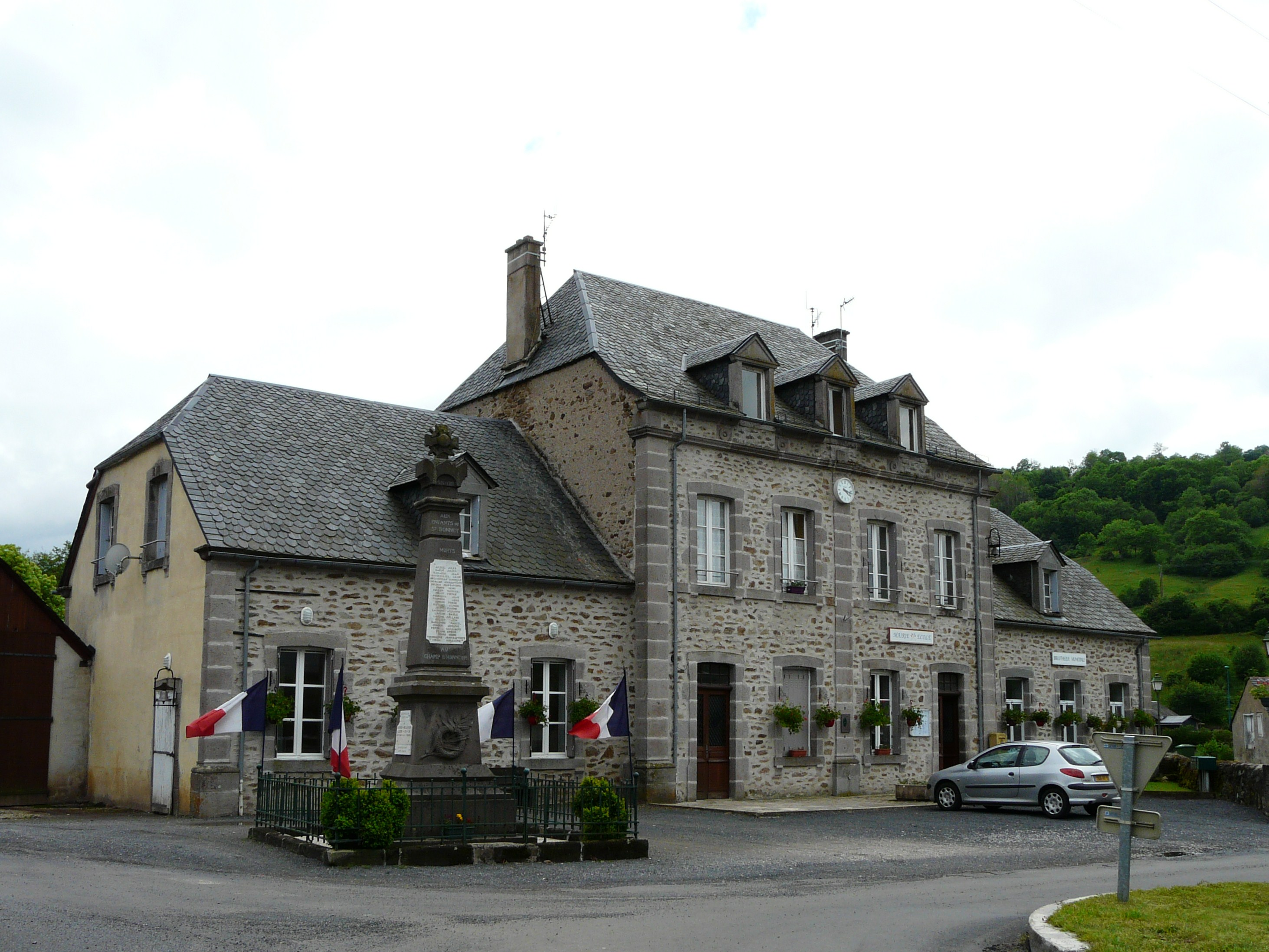
- Town hall
- Location of Saint-Bonnet-de-Condat
- Location within France Location within Auvergne-Rhône-Alpes
- Coordinates: 45°16′51″N 2°47′21″E
- Country: France
- Region: Auvergne-Rhône-Alpes
- Department: Cantal
- Arrondissement: Saint-Flour
- Canton: Riom-ès-Montagnes
- Intercommunality: Pays Gentiane

Government
  - Mayor (2020–2026): Jean-Paul Malbec
- Area^{1}: 17.32 km^{2} (6.69 sq mi)
- Elevation: 900 m (3,000 ft)
- Highest elevation: 1,146 m (3,760 ft)
- Lowest elevation: 799 m (2,621 ft)
- Population (2023): 113
  - Density: 6.52/km^{2} (16.9/sq mi)
- Time zone: UTC+01:00 (CET)
  - Summer (DST): UTC+02:00 (CEST)
- INSEE/Postal code: 15173 /15190
- ^{1} French Land Register data, which excludes lakes, ponds, glaciers > 1 km^{2} (0.386 sq mi or 247 acres) and river estuaries.

Saint-Bonnet-de-Condat (French pronunciation: [sɛ̃ bɔnɛ də kɔ̃da]; Auvergnat: Sant Bonet de Condat) is a commune in the Cantal department in south-central France.

== Population ==
Historical population
| Year | Pop. | ±% p.a. |
|---|---|---|
| 1968 | 406 | — |
| 1975 | 402 | −0.14% |
| 1982 | 363 | −1.45% |
| 1990 | 278 | −3.28% |
| 1999 | 177 | −4.89% |
| 2007 | 151 | −1.97% |
| 2012 | 99 | −8.10% |
| 2017 | 116 | +3.22% |
| 2023 | 113 | −0.44% |
Source: INSEE

== See also ==
- Communes of the Cantal department
