= Moussages =

Commune in Auvergne-Rhône-Alpes, France

- Commune
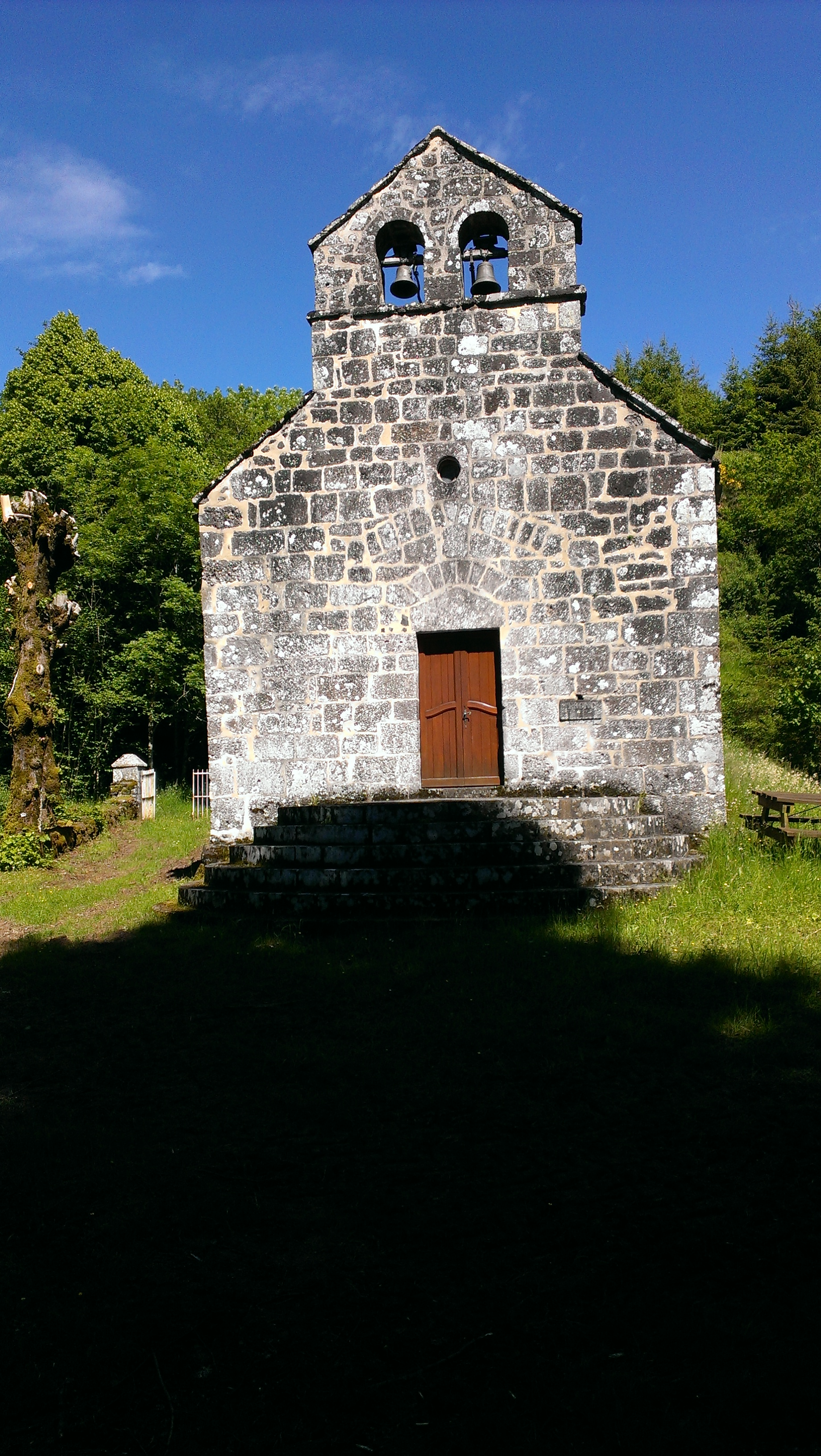
- The Chapel of Jailhac, in Moussages
- Location of Moussages
- Location within France Location within Auvergne-Rhône-Alpes
- Coordinates: 45°14′19″N 2°28′17″E
- Country: France
- Region: Auvergne-Rhône-Alpes
- Department: Cantal
- Arrondissement: Mauriac
- Canton: Riom-ès-Montagnes
- Intercommunality: Pays de Mauriac

Government
  - Mayor (2020–2026): Christian Vert
- Area^{1}: 19.03 km^{2} (7.35 sq mi)
- Elevation: 810 m (2,660 ft)
- Highest elevation: 1,003 m (3,291 ft)
- Lowest elevation: 549 m (1,801 ft)
- Population (2023): 247
  - Density: 13.0/km^{2} (33.6/sq mi)
- Time zone: UTC+01:00 (CET)
  - Summer (DST): UTC+02:00 (CEST)
- INSEE/Postal code: 15137 /15380
- ^{1} French Land Register data, which excludes lakes, ponds, glaciers > 1 km^{2} (0.386 sq mi or 247 acres) and river estuaries.

Moussages (French pronunciation: [musaʒ]; Occitan: Moçajas) is a commune in the Cantal department in south-central France.

== Population ==
Historical population
Year	Pop.	±% p.a.
1968	502	—
1975	418	−2.58%
1982	378	−1.43%
1990	319	−2.10%
1999	293	−0.94%
2007	266	−1.20%
2012	272	+0.45%
2017	273	+0.07%
2023	247	−1.65%
Source: INSEE

== See also ==
- Communes of the Cantal department
