= Auzers =

Commune in Auvergne-Rhône-Alpes, France

- Commune
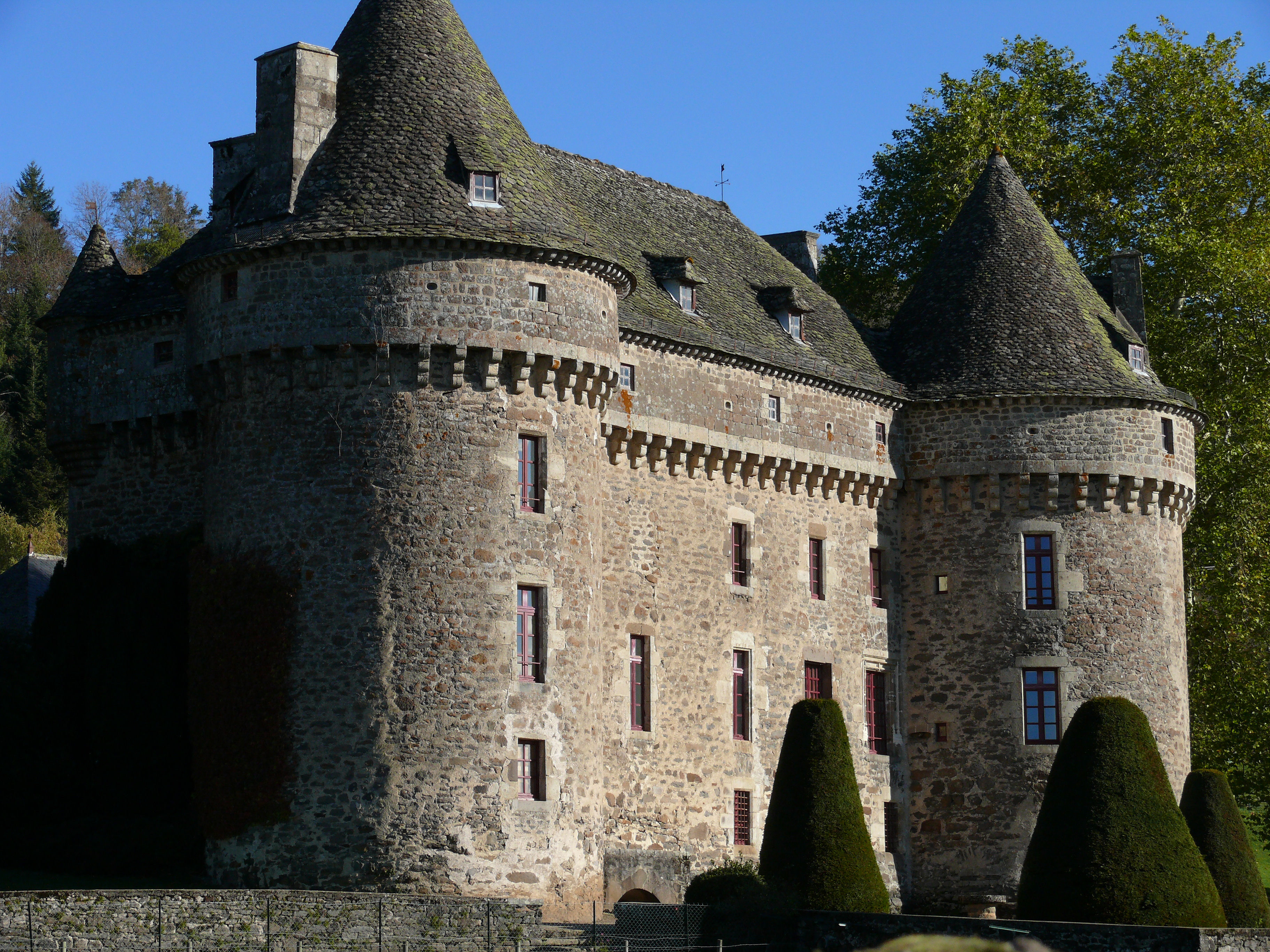
- Chateau
- Location of Auzers
- Location within France Location within Auvergne-Rhône-Alpes
- Coordinates: 45°15′54″N 2°27′34″E
- Country: France
- Region: Auvergne-Rhône-Alpes
- Department: Cantal
- Arrondissement: Mauriac
- Canton: Riom-ès-Montagnes
- Intercommunality: CC Pays Mauriac

Government
  - Mayor (2021–2026): Jacques Bresson
- Area^{1}: 19.27 km^{2} (7.44 sq mi)
- Elevation: 750 m (2,460 ft)
- Highest elevation: 908 m (2,979 ft)
- Lowest elevation: 440 m (1,440 ft)
- Population (2023): 159
  - Density: 8.25/km^{2} (21.4/sq mi)
- Time zone: UTC+01:00 (CET)
  - Summer (DST): UTC+02:00 (CEST)
- INSEE/Postal code: 15015 /15240
- ^{1} French Land Register data, which excludes lakes, ponds, glaciers > 1 km^{2} (0.386 sq mi or 247 acres) and river estuaries.

Auzers is a commune in the Cantal department in south-central France.

== Population ==
Historical population
Year	Pop.	±% p.a.
1968	431	—
1975	388	−1.49%
1982	331	−2.24%
1990	252	−3.35%
1999	236	−0.73%
2007	208	−1.57%
2012	179	−2.96%
2017	166	−1.50%
2023	159	−0.72%
Source: INSEE

== See also ==
- Communes of the Cantal department
