= Canton of Riom-ès-Montagnes =

Coordinates: 45.28°N 2.66°E

- Canton
- Situation of the canton of Riom-ès-Montagnes in the department of Cantal
- Country: France
- Region: Auvergne-Rhône-Alpes
- Department: Cantal
- No. of communes: {{{nbcomm}}}
- Population (2023): 7,400
- INSEE code: 1510

The canton of Riom-ès-Montagnes is an administrative division of the Cantal department, southern France. Its borders were modified at the French canton reorganisation which came into effect in March 2015. Its seat is in Riom-ès-Montagnes.

It consists of the following communes:

1. Apchon
2. Auzers
3. Chanterelle
4. Collandres
5. Condat
6. Le Falgoux
7. Lugarde
8. Marcenat
9. Marchastel
10. Méallet
11. Menet
12. Montboudif
13. Montgreleix
14. Moussages
15. Riom-ès-Montagnes
16. Saint-Amandin
17. Saint-Bonnet-de-Condat
18. Saint-Étienne-de-Chomeil
19. Saint-Hippolyte
20. Saint-Vincent-de-Salers
21. Trizac
22. Valette
23. Le Vaulmier
