= Valette, Cantal =

Commune in Auvergne-Rhône-Alpes, France

Valette
- Commune
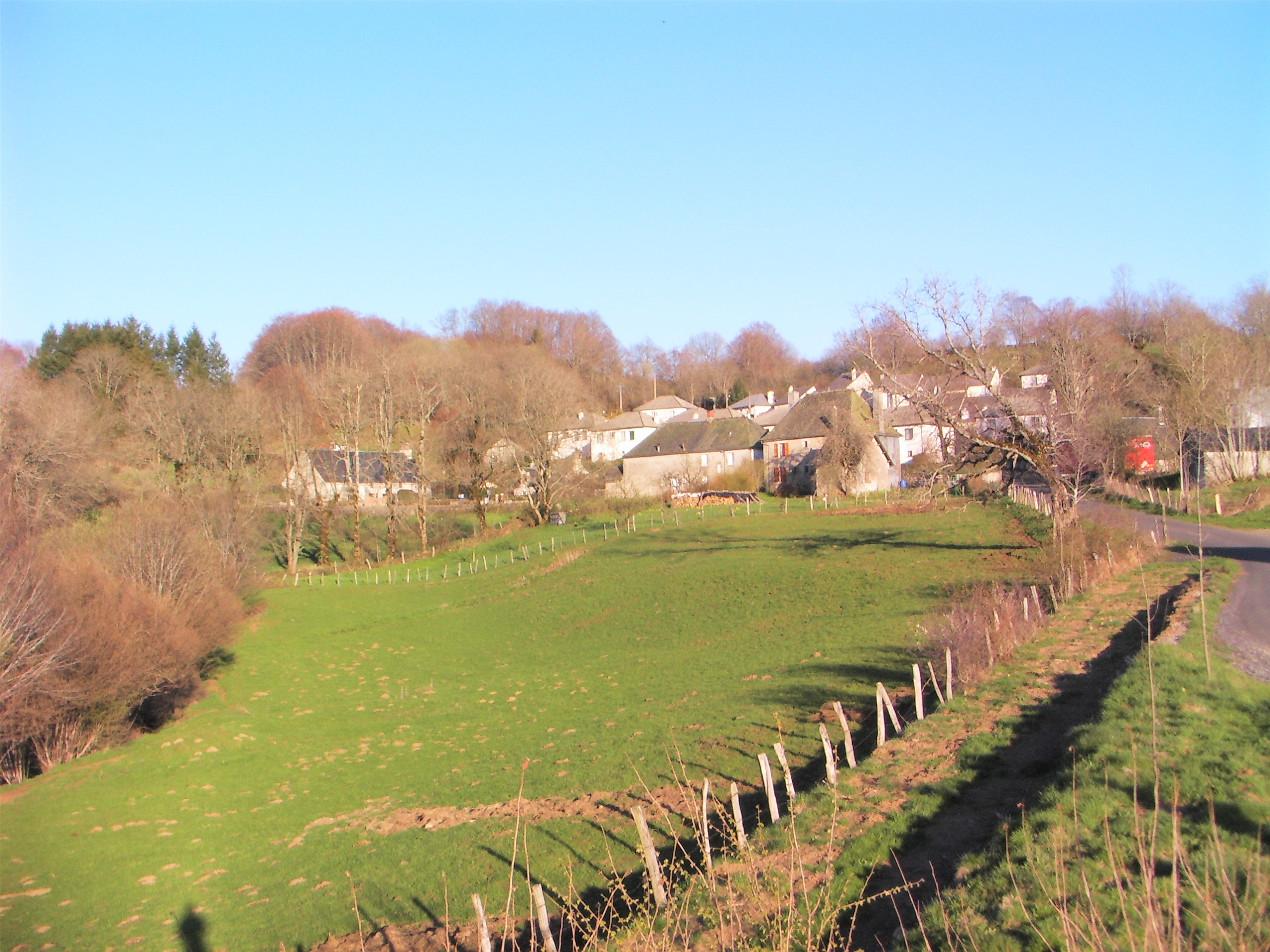
- A general view of Valette
- Location of Valette
- Location within France Location within Auvergne-Rhône-Alpes
- Coordinates: 45°16′07″N 2°36′14″E
- Country: France
- Region: Auvergne-Rhône-Alpes
- Department: Cantal
- Arrondissement: Mauriac
- Canton: Riom-ès-Montagnes
- Intercommunality: Pays Gentiane

Government
  - Mayor (2020–2026): Valérie Cabecas Roquier
- Area^{1}: 14.9 km^{2} (5.8 sq mi)
- Elevation: 892 m (2,927 ft)
- Highest elevation: 1,133 m (3,717 ft)
- Lowest elevation: 677 m (2,221 ft)
- Population (2023): 236
  - Density: 15.8/km^{2} (41.0/sq mi)
- Time zone: UTC+01:00 (CET)
  - Summer (DST): UTC+02:00 (CEST)
- INSEE/Postal code: 15246 /15400
- ^{1} French Land Register data, which excludes lakes, ponds, glaciers > 1 km^{2} (0.386 sq mi or 247 acres) and river estuaries.

Valette (French pronunciation: [valɛt]; Occitan: Valeta) is a commune in the Cantal department in south-central France.

== Population ==
Historical population
Year	Pop.	±% p.a.
1968	359	—
1975	289	−3.05%
1982	307	+0.87%
1990	284	−0.97%
1999	261	−0.93%
2007	259	−0.10%
2012	273	+1.06%
2017	228	−3.54%
2023	236	+0.58%
Source: INSEE

== See also ==
- Communes of the Cantal department
