= Menet =

Commune in Auvergne-Rhône-Alpes, France

- Commune
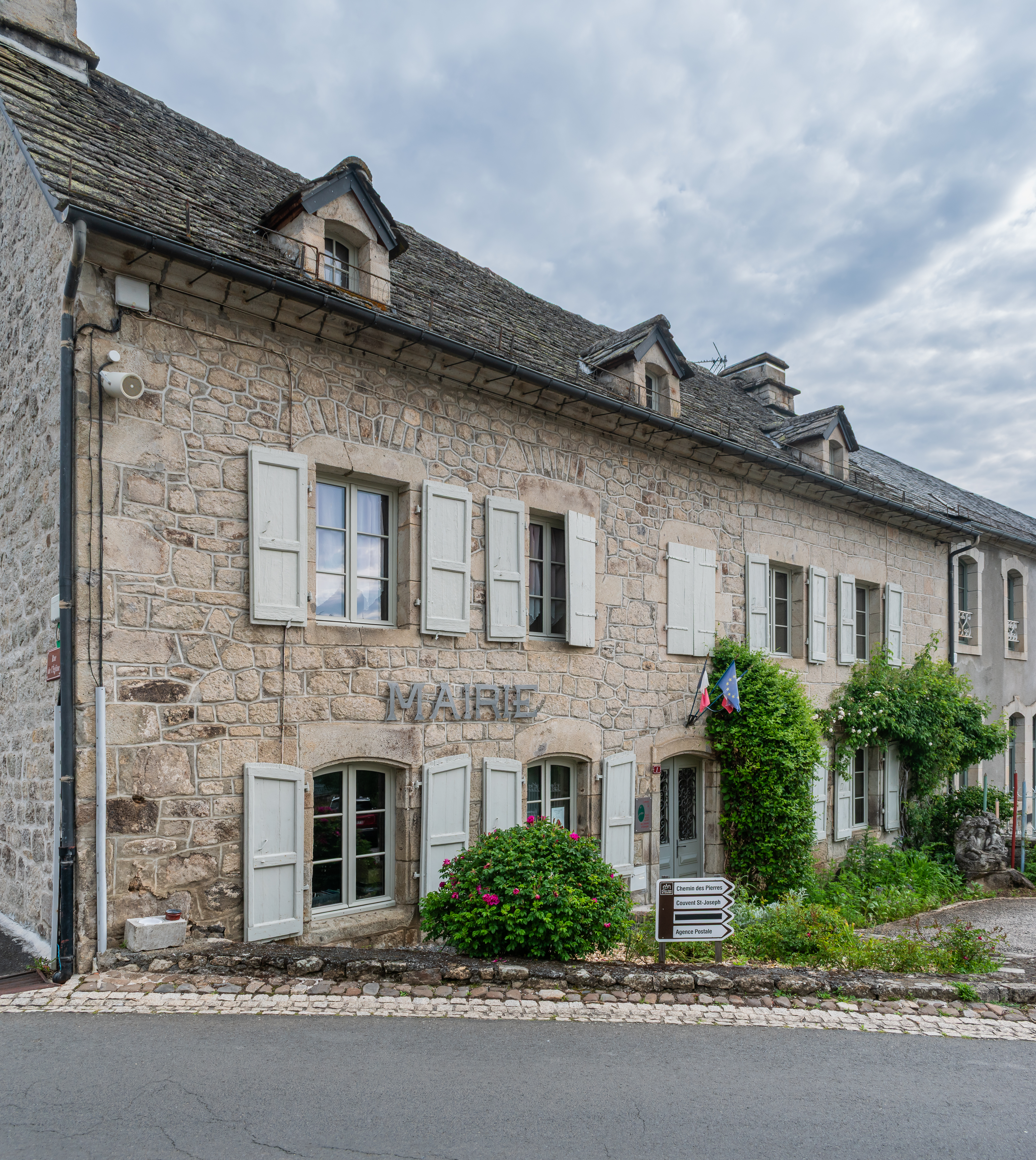
- The town hall of Menet
- Location of Menet
- Location within France Location within Auvergne-Rhône-Alpes
- Coordinates: 45°17′51″N 2°35′03″E
- Country: France
- Region: Auvergne-Rhône-Alpes
- Department: Cantal
- Arrondissement: Mauriac
- Canton: Riom-ès-Montagnes
- Intercommunality: Pays Gentiane

Government
  - Mayor (2020–2026): Jean-Louis Marandon
- Area^{1}: 29.86 km^{2} (11.53 sq mi)
- Elevation: 715 m (2,346 ft)
- Highest elevation: 980 m (3,220 ft)
- Lowest elevation: 579 m (1,900 ft)
- Population (2023): 521
  - Density: 17.4/km^{2} (45.2/sq mi)
- Time zone: UTC+01:00 (CET)
  - Summer (DST): UTC+02:00 (CEST)
- INSEE/Postal code: 15124 /15400
- ^{1} French Land Register data, which excludes lakes, ponds, glaciers > 1 km^{2} (0.386 sq mi or 247 acres) and river estuaries.

Menet (French pronunciation: [mənɛ]; Occitan: Marc) is a commune in the Cantal department in south-central France.

The village is noteworthy for its twelfth century Romanesque Church of St Peter, and for its small lake.

== Population ==
Historical population
Year	Pop.	±% p.a.
1968	819	—
1975	653	−3.18%
1982	653	+0.00%
1990	622	−0.61%
1999	580	−0.77%
2007	511	−1.57%
2012	520	+0.35%
2017	555	+1.31%
2023	521	−1.05%
Source: INSEE

== See also ==
- Communes of the Cantal department
