= Marchastel, Cantal =

Commune in Auvergne-Rhône-Alpes, France

Marchastel
- Commune
- Location of Marchastel
- Location within France Location within Auvergne-Rhône-Alpes
- Coordinates: 45°17′02″N 2°43′33″E
- Country: France
- Region: Auvergne-Rhône-Alpes
- Department: Cantal
- Arrondissement: Saint-Flour
- Canton: Riom-ès-Montagnes
- Intercommunality: Pays Gentiane

Government
  - Mayor (2020–2026): Jean-Maurice Emorine
- Area^{1}: 22.92 km^{2} (8.85 sq mi)
- Elevation: 929 m (3,048 ft)
- Highest elevation: 1,176 m (3,858 ft)
- Lowest elevation: 769 m (2,523 ft)
- Population (2023): 131
  - Density: 5.72/km^{2} (14.8/sq mi)
- Time zone: UTC+01:00 (CET)
  - Summer (DST): UTC+02:00 (CEST)
- INSEE/Postal code: 15116 /15400
- ^{1} French Land Register data, which excludes lakes, ponds, glaciers > 1 km^{2} (0.386 sq mi or 247 acres) and river estuaries.

Marchastel (French pronunciation: [maʁʃastɛl]; Occitan: Marchastèl) is a commune in the Cantal department in south-central France.

== Population ==
Historical population
Year	Pop.	±% p.a.
1968	513	—
1975	410	−3.15%
1982	305	−4.14%
1990	216	−4.22%
1999	169	−2.69%
2007	165	−0.30%
2012	145	−2.55%
2017	154	+1.21%
2023	131	−2.66%
Source: INSEE

== See also ==
- Communes of the Cantal department
