= Saint-Amandin =

Commune in Auvergne-Rhône-Alpes, France

- Commune
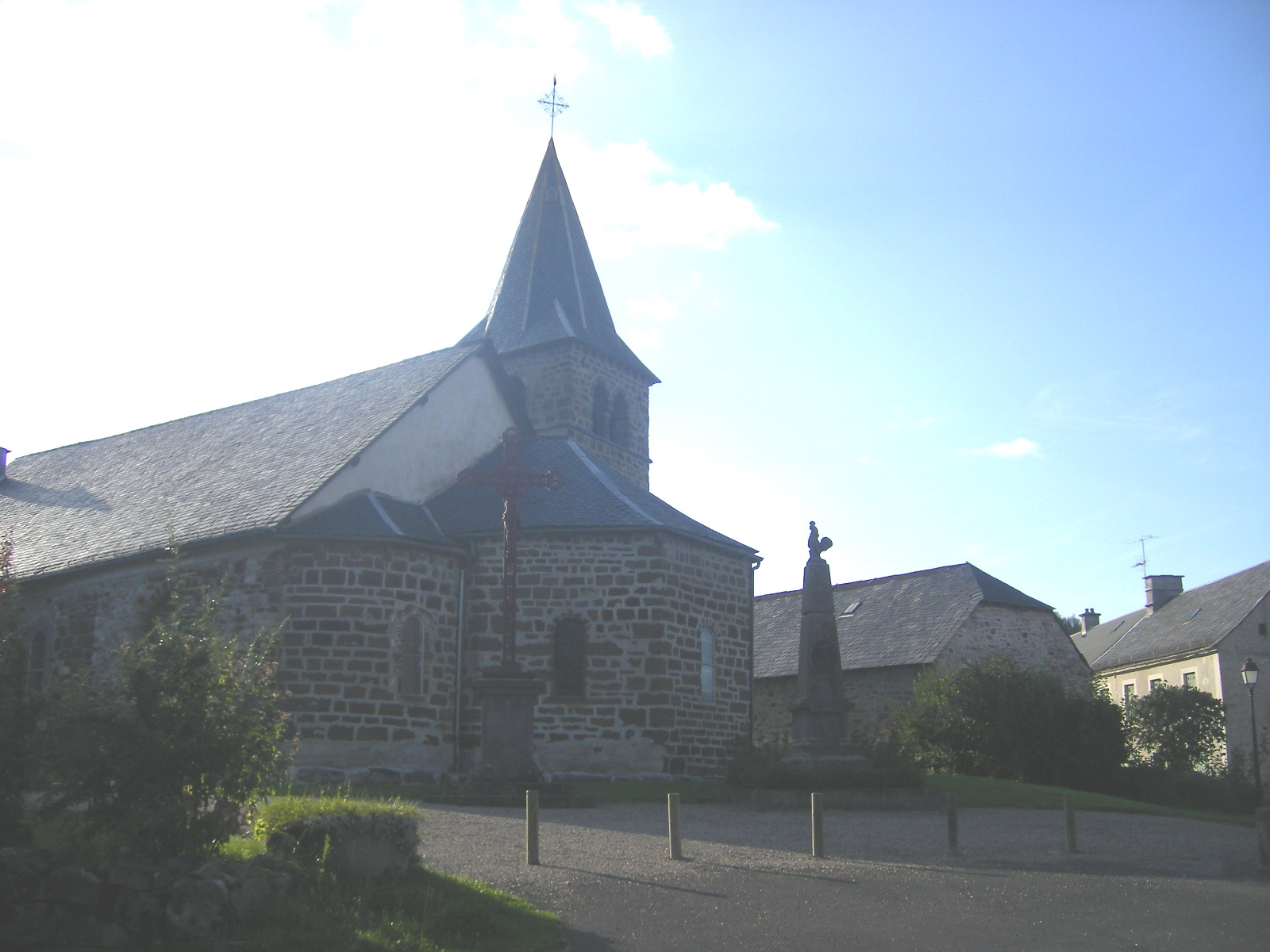
- The church and the war memorial
- Location of Saint-Amandin
- Location within France Location within Auvergne-Rhône-Alpes
- Coordinates: 45°20′38″N 2°41′44″E
- Country: France
- Region: Auvergne-Rhône-Alpes
- Department: Cantal
- Arrondissement: Saint-Flour
- Canton: Riom-ès-Montagnes
- Intercommunality: Pays Gentiane

Government
  - Mayor (2020–2026): Alexandre Favory
- Area^{1}: 31.89 km^{2} (12.31 sq mi)
- Elevation: 840 m (2,760 ft)
- Highest elevation: 1,072 m (3,517 ft)
- Lowest elevation: 577 m (1,893 ft)
- Population (2023): 225
  - Density: 7.06/km^{2} (18.3/sq mi)
- Time zone: UTC+01:00 (CET)
  - Summer (DST): UTC+02:00 (CEST)
- INSEE/Postal code: 15170 /15190
- ^{1} French Land Register data, which excludes lakes, ponds, glaciers > 1 km^{2} (0.386 sq mi or 247 acres) and river estuaries.

Saint-Amandin (French pronunciation: [sɛ̃.t‿amɑ̃dɛ̃]; Occitan: Senta Amandina) is a commune in the Cantal department in south-central France.

== Geography ==
The river Rhue forms all of the commune's northern border.

== Population ==
Historical population
| Year | Pop. | ±% p.a. |
|---|---|---|
| 1968 | 603 | — |
| 1975 | 422 | −4.97% |
| 1982 | 337 | −3.16% |
| 1990 | 284 | −2.12% |
| 1999 | 245 | −1.63% |
| 2007 | 241 | −0.21% |
| 2012 | 222 | −1.63% |
| 2017 | 231 | +0.80% |
| 2023 | 225 | −0.44% |
Source: INSEE

== See also ==
- Communes of the Cantal department
