= Collandres =

Commune in Auvergne-Rhône-Alpes, France

- Commune
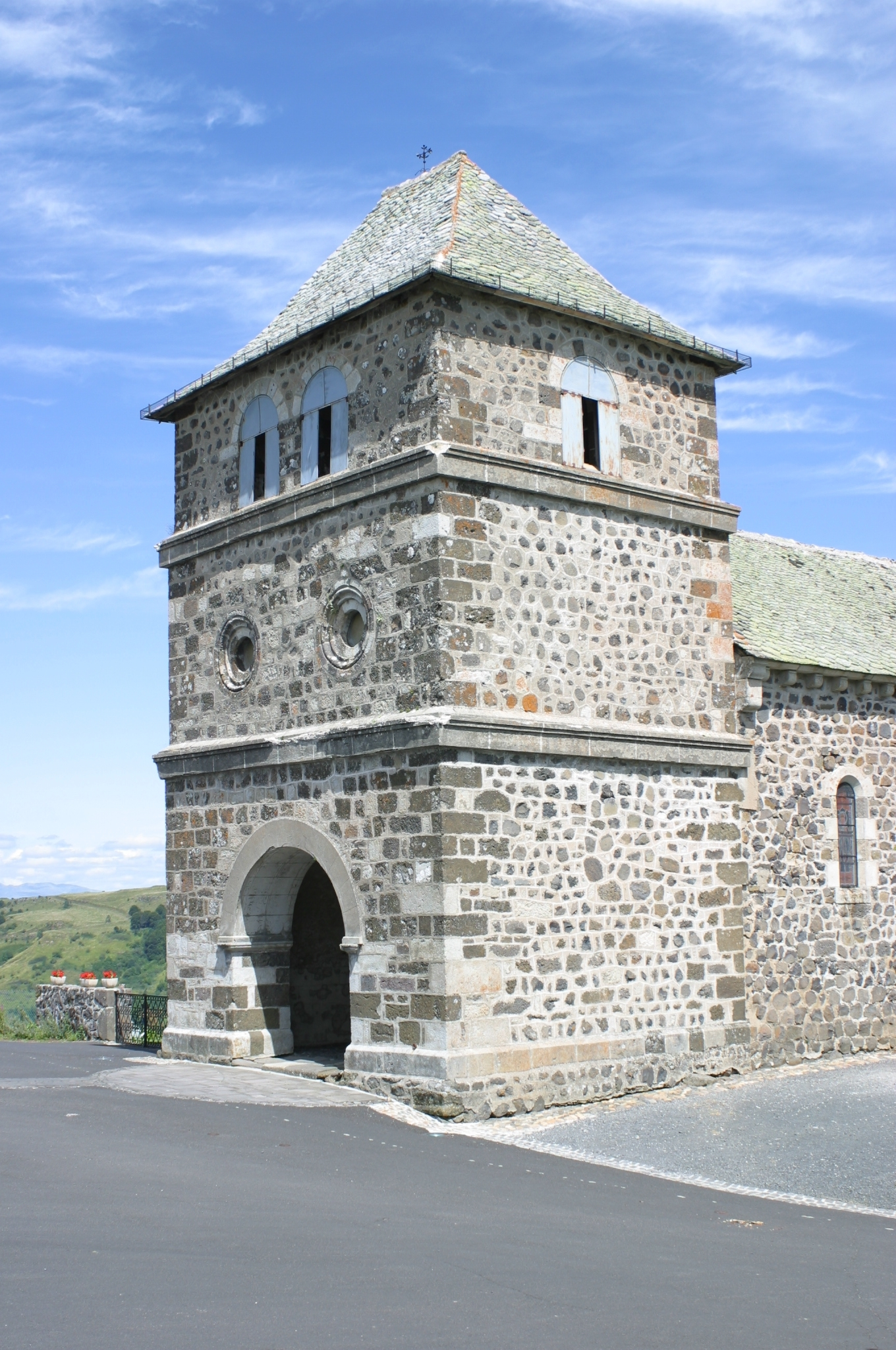
- The church in Collandres
- Location of Collandres
- Location within France Location within Auvergne-Rhône-Alpes
- Coordinates: 45°14′14″N 2°39′29″E
- Country: France
- Region: Auvergne-Rhône-Alpes
- Department: Cantal
- Arrondissement: Mauriac
- Canton: Riom-ès-Montagnes
- Intercommunality: Pays Gentiane

Government
  - Mayor (2020–2026): Charles Rodde
- Area^{1}: 43.32 km^{2} (16.73 sq mi)
- Elevation: 1,077 m (3,533 ft)
- Highest elevation: 1,540 m (5,050 ft)
- Lowest elevation: 896 m (2,940 ft)
- Population (2023): 155
  - Density: 3.58/km^{2} (9.27/sq mi)
- Time zone: UTC+01:00 (CET)
  - Summer (DST): UTC+02:00 (CEST)
- INSEE/Postal code: 15052 /15400
- ^{1} French Land Register data, which excludes lakes, ponds, glaciers > 1 km^{2} (0.386 sq mi or 247 acres) and river estuaries.

Collandres (French pronunciation: [kɔlɑ̃dʁ]; Occitan: Colandre) is a commune in the Cantal department in south-central France.

== Population ==
Historical population
Year	Pop.	±% p.a.
1968	414	—
1975	359	−2.02%
1982	322	−1.54%
1990	283	−1.60%
1999	223	−2.61%
2007	184	−2.37%
2012	159	−2.88%
2017	152	−0.90%
2023	155	+0.33%
Source: INSEE

== See also ==
- Communes of the Cantal department
