= Condat, Cantal =

Commune in Auvergne-Rhône-Alpes, France

Condat
- Commune
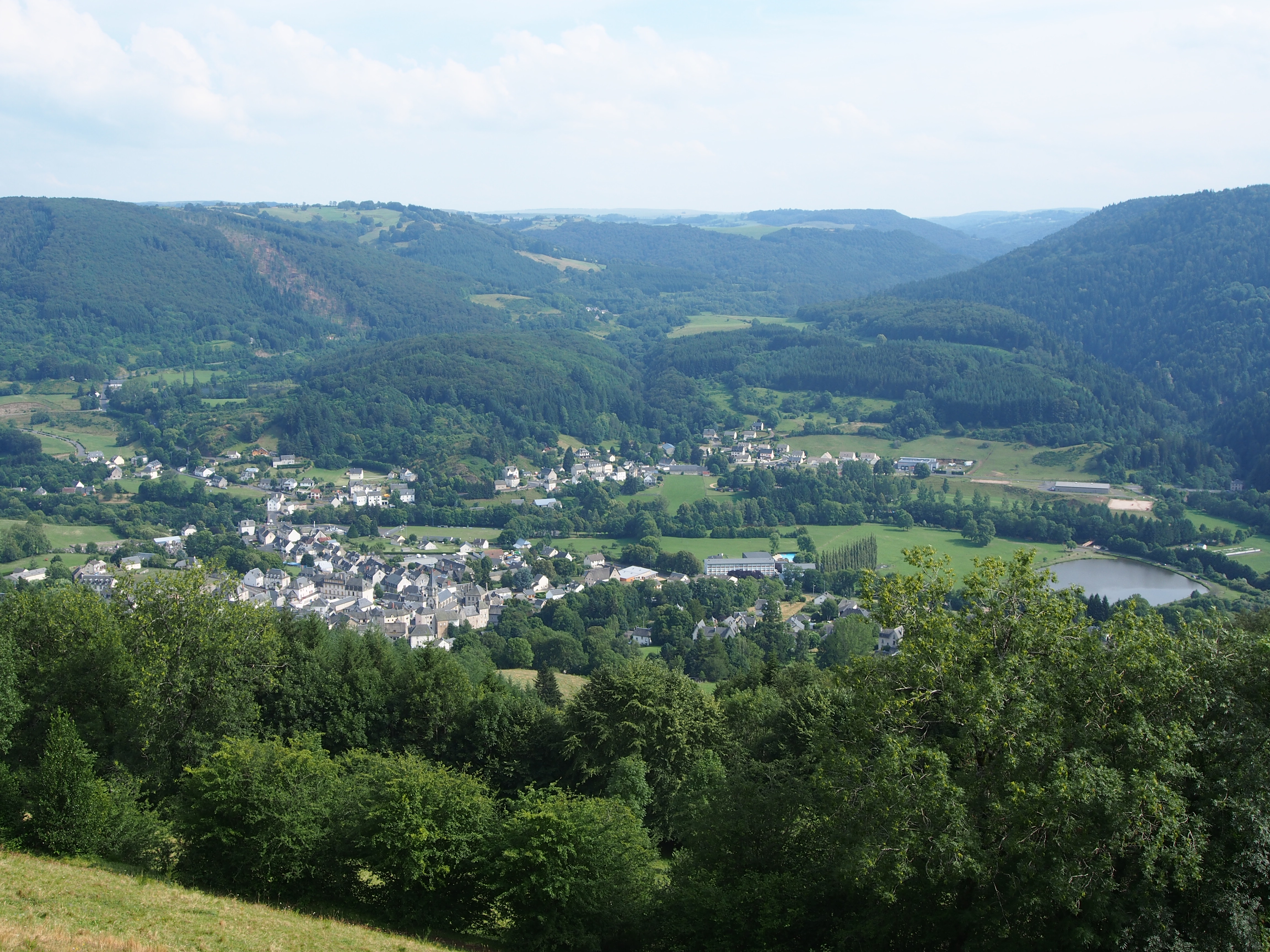
- A general view of Condat
- Location of Condat
- Location within France Location within Auvergne-Rhône-Alpes
- Coordinates: 45°20′30″N 2°45′27″E
- Country: France
- Region: Auvergne-Rhône-Alpes
- Department: Cantal
- Arrondissement: Saint-Flour
- Canton: Riom-ès-Montagnes

Government
  - Mayor (2020–2026): Jean Mage
- Area^{1}: 40.24 km^{2} (15.54 sq mi)
- Elevation: 700 m (2,300 ft)
- Highest elevation: 1,266 m (4,154 ft)
- Lowest elevation: 672 m (2,205 ft)
- Population (2023): 933
  - Density: 23.2/km^{2} (60.1/sq mi)
- Time zone: UTC+01:00 (CET)
  - Summer (DST): UTC+02:00 (CEST)
- INSEE/Postal code: 15054 /15190
- ^{1} French Land Register data, which excludes lakes, ponds, glaciers > 1 km^{2} (0.386 sq mi or 247 acres) and river estuaries.

Condat (French pronunciation: [kɔ̃da]) is a commune in the Cantal department in south-central France.

== Geography ==
The village lies in the southern part of the commune, on the right bank of the Rhue.

== Population ==
Historical population
Year	Pop.	±% p.a.
1968	1,592	—
1975	1,481	−1.03%
1982	1,438	−0.42%
1990	1,262	−1.62%
1999	1,121	−1.31%
2007	1,010	−1.29%
2012	1,025	+0.30%
2017	995	−0.59%
2023	933	−1.07%
Source: INSEE

== See also ==
- Communes of the Cantal department
