= Saint-Hippolyte, Cantal =

Commune in Auvergne-Rhône-Alpes, France

Saint-Hippolyte
- Commune
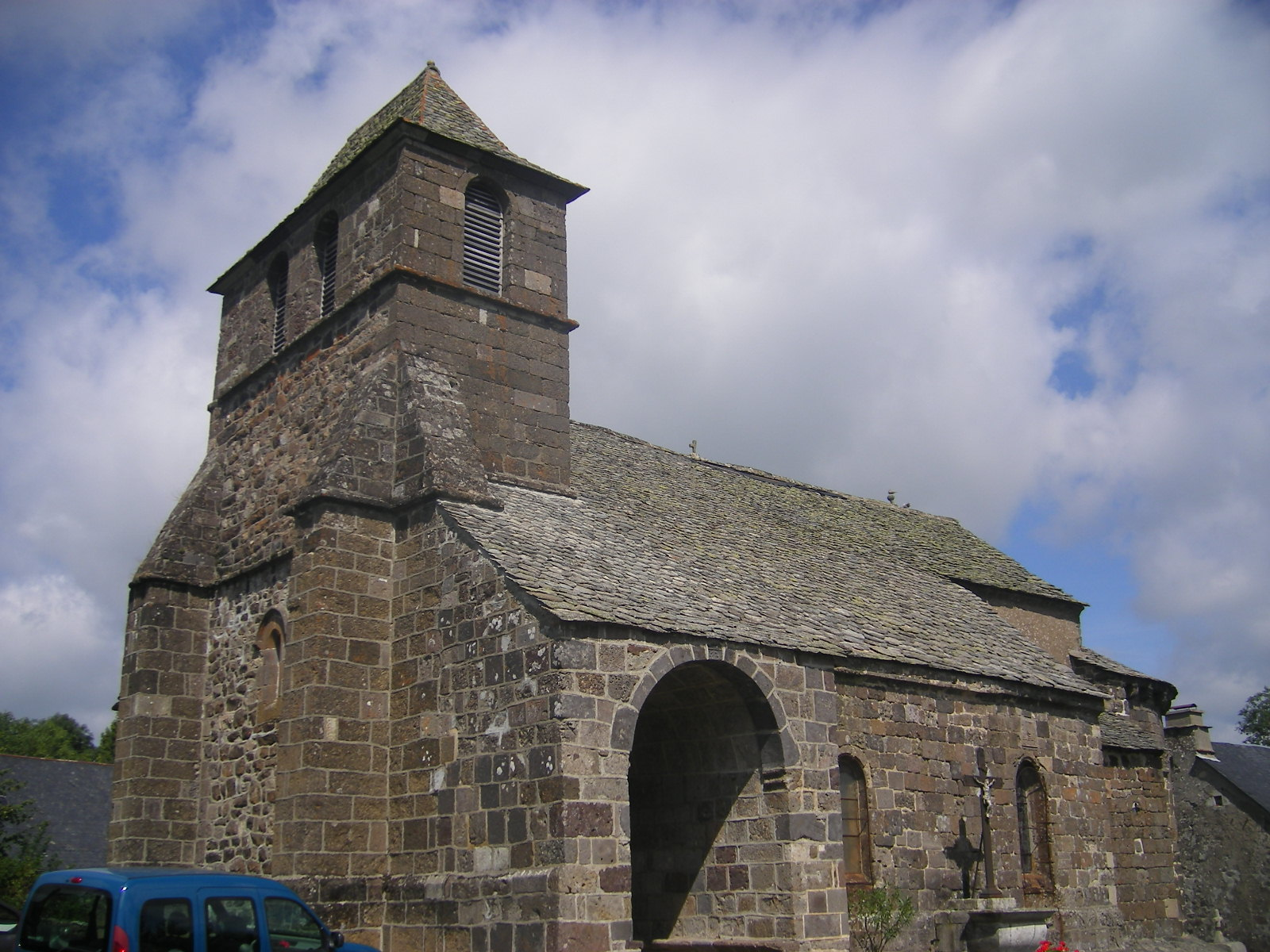
- The church in Saint-Hippolyte
- Location of Saint-Hippolyte
- Location within France Location within Auvergne-Rhône-Alpes
- Coordinates: 45°13′30″N 2°42′18″E
- Country: France
- Region: Auvergne-Rhône-Alpes
- Department: Cantal
- Arrondissement: Mauriac
- Canton: Riom-ès-Montagnes
- Intercommunality: Pays Gentiane

Government
  - Mayor (2020–2026): Blandine Van Dyk
- Area^{1}: 13.92 km^{2} (5.37 sq mi)
- Elevation: 1,000 m (3,300 ft)
- Highest elevation: 1,336 m (4,383 ft)
- Lowest elevation: 879 m (2,884 ft)
- Population (2023): 99
  - Density: 7.1/km^{2} (18/sq mi)
- Time zone: UTC+01:00 (CET)
  - Summer (DST): UTC+02:00 (CEST)
- INSEE/Postal code: 15190 /15400
- ^{1} French Land Register data, which excludes lakes, ponds, glaciers > 1 km^{2} (0.386 sq mi or 247 acres) and river estuaries.

Saint-Hippolyte (French pronunciation: [sɛ̃.t‿ipɔlit]; Auvergnat: Sanch Ipòlit) is a commune in the Cantal department in south-central France.

== Population ==
Historical population
Year	Pop.	±% p.a.
1968	235	—
1975	209	−1.66%
1982	149	−4.72%
1990	140	−0.78%
1999	122	−1.52%
2007	114	−0.84%
2012	103	−2.01%
2017	117	+2.58%
2023	99	−2.75%
Source: INSEE

== See also ==
- Communes of the Cantal department
