= Peter Graham (writer) =

British writer (1939–2020)

Peter John Graham
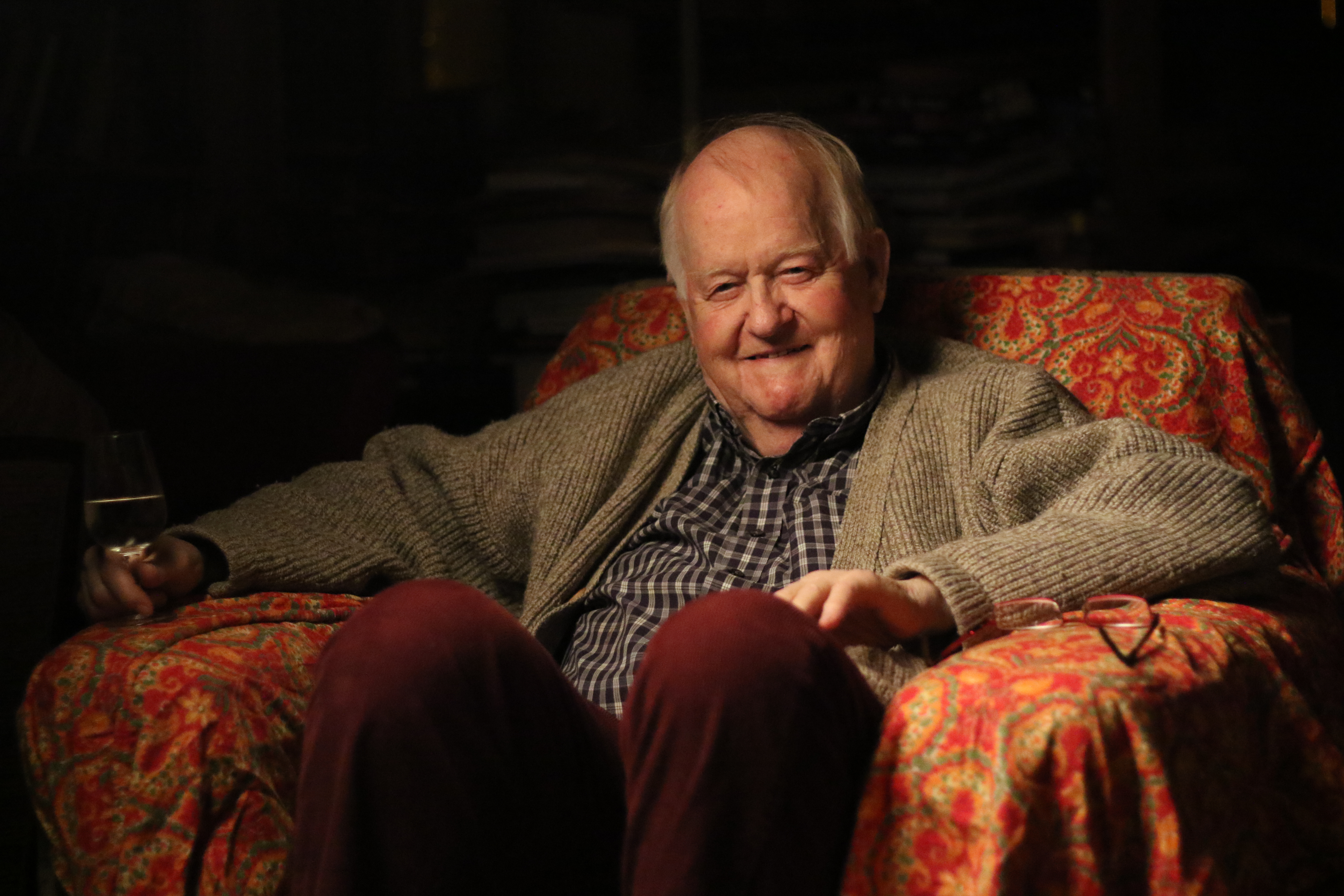
- Born: Peter John Graham; 8 December 1939; Newbury, Berkshire, England
- Died: 6 July 2020 (aged 80)
- Occupations: Writer, restaurant critic, translator, filmmaker

Peter John Graham (8 December 1939 – 6 July 2020) was a British writer, restaurant critic, translator and filmmaker based in France. He was the author of several books about film and about food, including A Dictionary of the Cinema (1964), The French New Wave (1968) and Mourjou: The Life and Food of an Auvergne Village (1998), which recounted the culinary life of the remote French village in which he lived for more than four decades.

== Early life ==
Graham was born on 8 December 1939 in Newbury, Berkshire, and grew up in London with his parents (Richard, an advertising copywriter, and Anne, née Scratchley, previously a ballet dancer) and sister Elizabeth. The seeds of Graham's love of France and film were sown early: his parents were keen Francophiles and his godmother a French film producer through whom he landed a role as an English schoolboy in Pierre Billon's feature film Au revoir M. Grock (1949).

== University years ==
Graham was educated at University College School, Hampstead, and King's College, Cambridge, where alongside a degree in French and classics he pursued his involvement in cinema by contributing reviews to Granta (of which he was editor in 1961–62), Cambridge Opinion, and other publications. In 1963 he published a vitriolic pamphlet on contemporary British cinema, The Abortive Renaissance: Why Are Good British Films So Bad?. At Cambridge, too, he made the first of his three short firms, A Shilling Life (1962–63), a fascinating document on early 1960s student life, featuring a cameo by future filmmaker Stephen Frears.

== Life in France: filmmaking, writing, translating ==
Graham moved to Paris in 1962, working as an English teacher and freelance translator. From the early 1970s to 2008, he worked for The Guardian Weekly, translating articles from Le Monde on a wide variety of subjects for a regular section in the paper. Throughout his life, he also translated several books on a range of topics, from film to food and psychoanalysis.

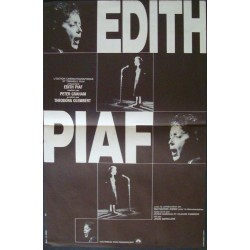
The original poster for Peter Graham's first French film Edith Piaf in 1968

His first French film was Edith Piaf (1968), a short documentary on the well-known French singer. This was followed by Au bout des fusils / At Gunpoint (1971), a semi-documentary exposé of scandalous hunting practices in the Sologne, a wooded area south of Orléans where he shared a house at the time. The film, part tribute to Jean Renoir's The Rules of the Game (1939) and its celebrated hunting scene, is notable for its cinematography by Polish director Walerian Borowczyk.

As well as his film reviews and festival reports for a variety of British publications, including The Guardian, the 1960s also saw the publication of two important books: the pioneering A Dictionary of the Cinema (Tantivy Press, 1964) and the anthology The New Wave (Secker & Warburg, 1968), published in an expanded edition as The French New Wave: Critical Landmarks by the British Film Institute in 2009, becoming a standard book for students and fans of the New Wave. At the time of his death, Graham was working with co-editor Ginette Vincendeau on a second, expanded edition of the book, published by Bloomsbury in 2022.

== Writing about food ==
In the 1970s Graham turned his long-standing devotion to food and good eating to profitable use, making a name for himself as a restaurant and food critic for The Guardian, The Sunday Times and the International Herald Tribune. For the last, he edited the International Herald Tribune Guide to Business Travel and Entertainment. He also contributed large chunks of text to the American Express Pocket Guide to Paris.

In 1978, he settled in what had once been a hotel-cum-café-cum-grocery store in the small village of Mourjou in the Auvergne, where he lived for the rest of his life. From there he pursued a number of food writing projects, beginning with Cuisine Niçoise: Recipes from a Mediterranean Kitchen (1983), a translation of recipes put together by the notorious mayor of Nice, Jacques Médecin. In 1988, he published the prize-winning Classic Cheese Cookery and, in 1998, Mourjou, The Life and Food of an Auvergne Village, a book that reflects both the author's expertise and his love for his village and its region: as he researched the history of Auvergne food, he also picked up many of his recipes from neighbouring farmers, bakers and pork butchers.

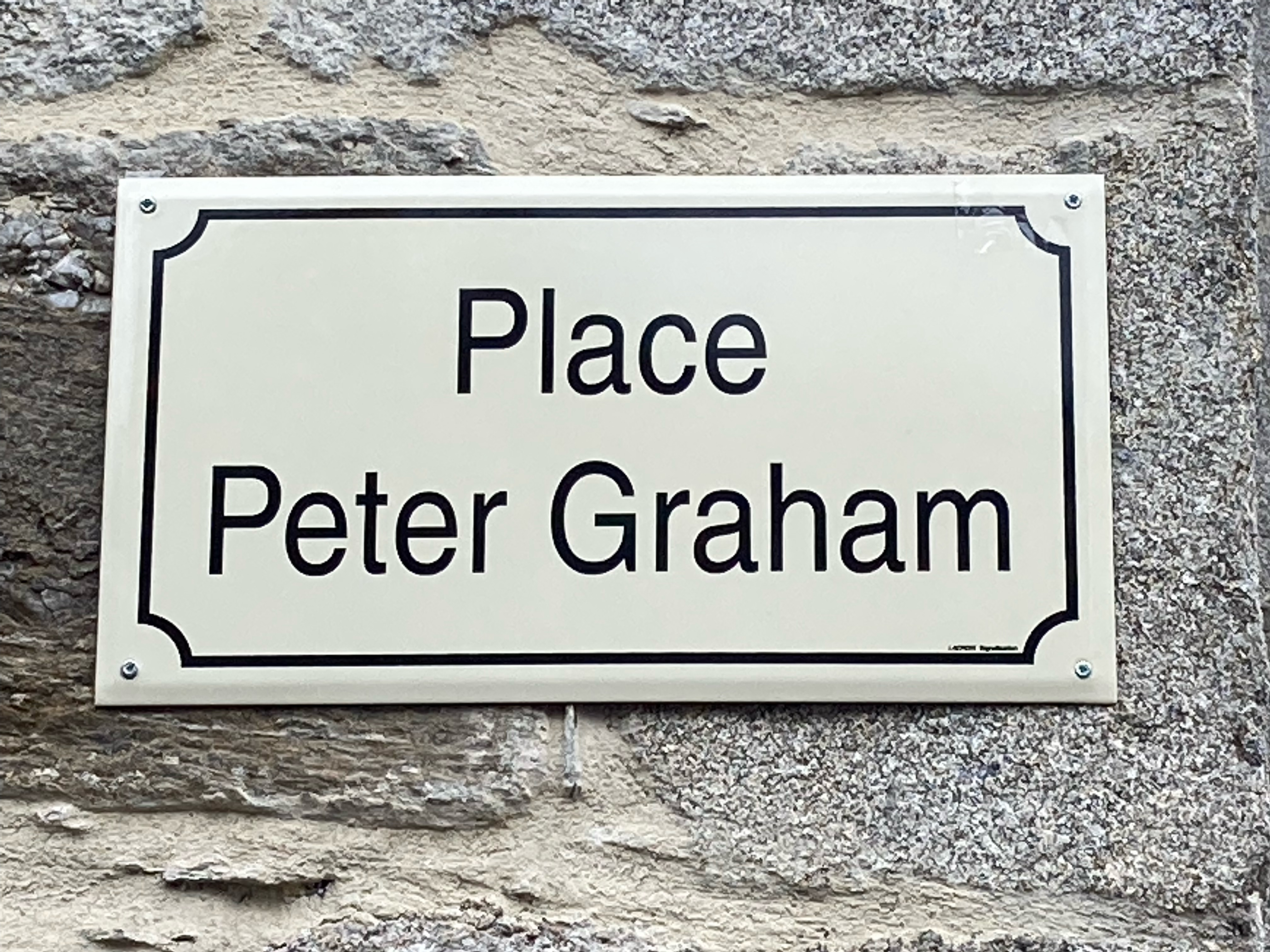
Photo by Simon Caulkin

In recent years, Graham wrote mainly for his culinary blog Chez Gram: his articles expertly exploring the meaning of the words used in French cooking. His writing was acknowledged in 2019 with a prize for his article on stockfish awarded by the state-funded tourist agency, Atout France.

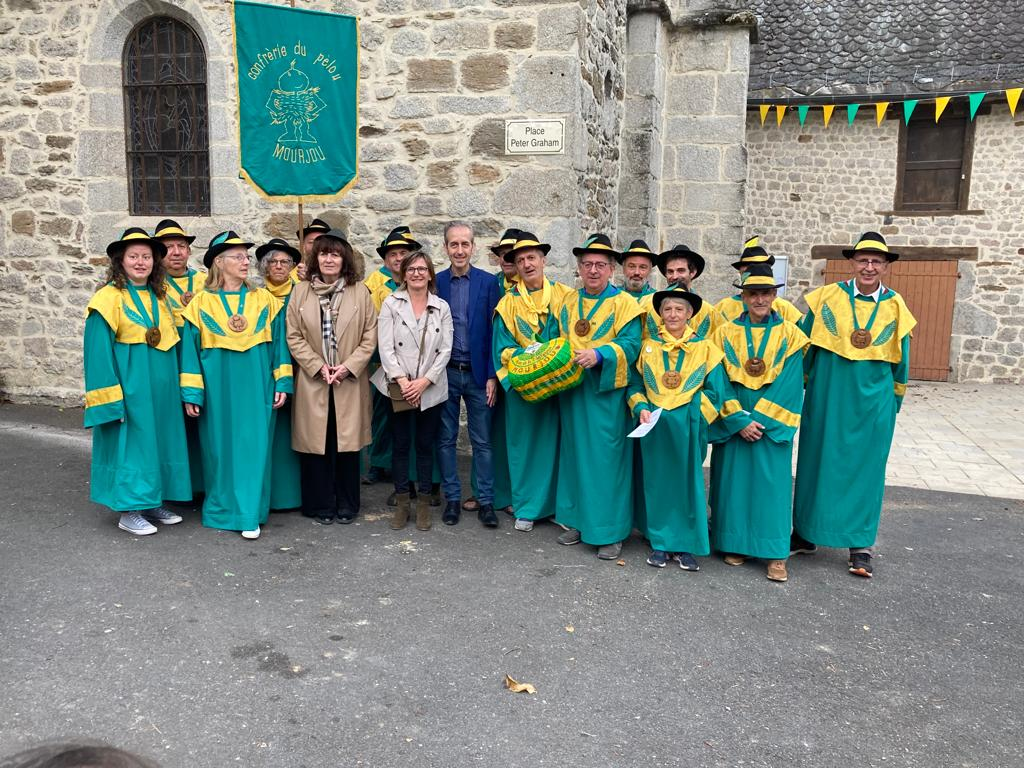
The inauguration of Place Peter Graham, with the Mayor and the Confrérie de la Châtaigne. Photo by Simon Caulkin

Graham played a founding part in the establishment of Mourjou's chestnut museum, the Maison de la Châtaigne. Housed in what had been Graham's barn, the museum is dedicated to celebrating and reviving the culture of a local speciality, Mourjou being set in the hilly, chestnut-covered area of La Châtaigneraie (Cantal). A tribute to his active local involvement, Graham officiated for many years as the first honorary Grand Maître de la Châtaigne.

On 23 October 2022, the square on which Graham lived in the village of Mourjou (now part of the Commune of Puycapel), Place de l'Eglise, was renamed Place Peter Graham, in a ceremony headed by the Mayor, M. François Danemans, during the annual Foire à la Châtaigne (Chestnut festival).

== Books ==
=== As author or editor ===
- The French New Wave: Critical Landmarks, with Ginette Vincendeau, new expanded edition, Bloomsbury, 2022.
- The French New Wave: Critical Landmarks, with Ginette Vincendeau, Palgrave, 2009 (originally published as The New Wave by Secker & Warburg in 1968).
- Mourjou: The Life and Food of an Auvergne Village, 1998, Viking, 230 pp. (French edition: Mourjou, traditions et recettes d'un village d’Auvergne, La Table Ronde, 2000).
- Classic Cheese Cookery, Penguin, 1988, 401 pp. – Winner of the 1988 André Simon Memorial Award.
- International Herald Tribune Guide to Business Travel and Entertainment: Europe, Thames & Hudson, 1983.
- A Dictionary of the Cinema, Tantivy Press, 1964, 160 pp.

=== As translator ===
- The Battle of the Sexes in French Cinema: 1930–1956, Noël Burch and Geneviève Sellier, Duke University Press, 2014.
- A Good Man in Evil Times, José-Alain Fralon, Carroll & Graf, 2001.
- Freud's Self-Analysis, Didier Anzieu, The Hogarth Press, 1986.
- Cuisine Niçoise: Recipes from a Mediterranean Kitchen, Jacques Médecin, Penguin, 1983.
- The Art of the Maya, Henri Stierlin, Evergreen, 1981.
- The Lost World of the Impressionists, Alice Bellony-Rewald, Weidenfeld & Nicolson, 1976.
- The Cinema of Luis Buñuel, Freddy Buache, Tantivy Press, 1973.
