= Saint-Santin-de-Maurs =

Commune in Auvergne-Rhône-Alpes, France

- Commune
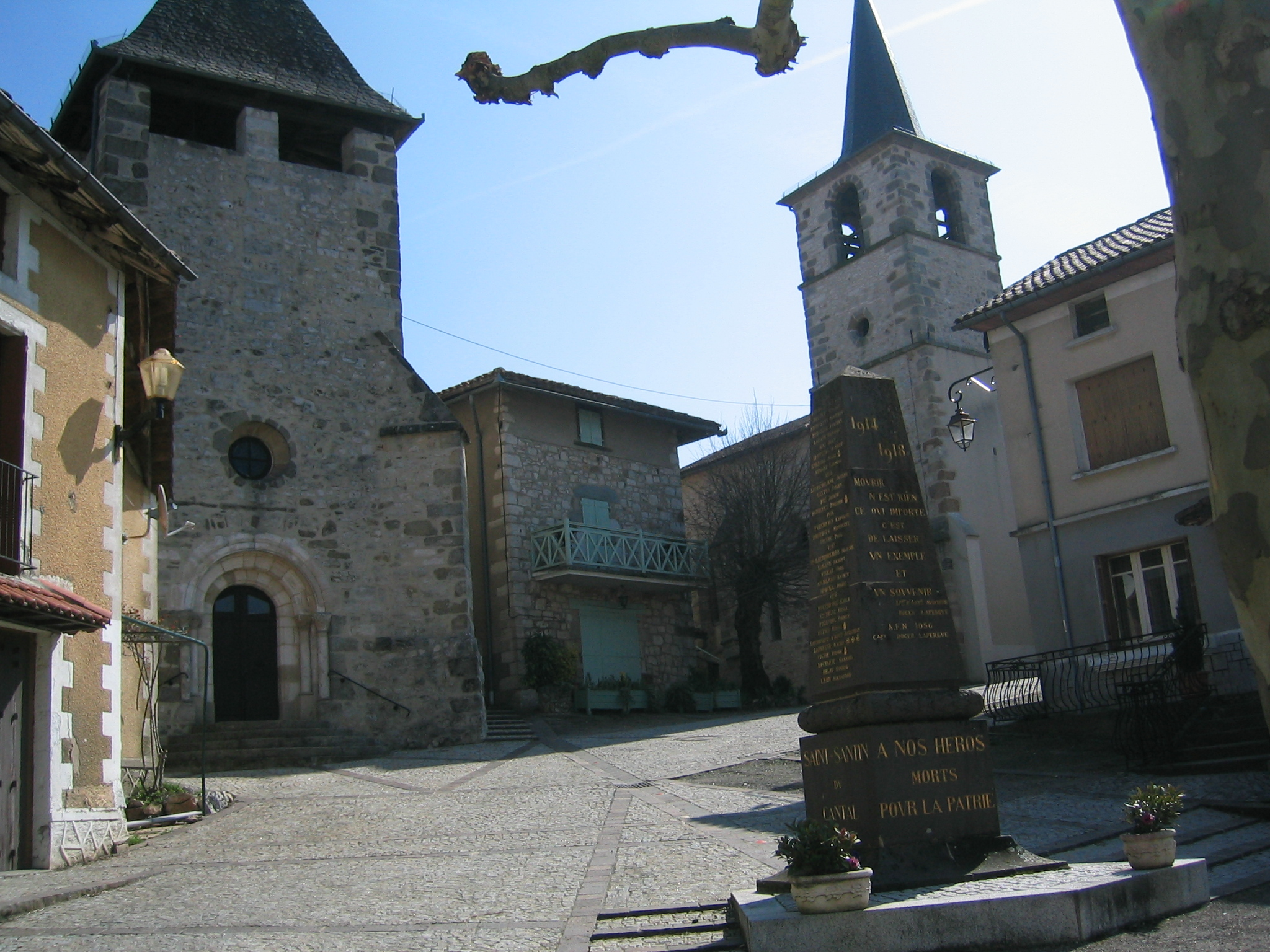
- The two churches in Saint-Santin-de-Maurs
- Location of Saint-Santin-de-Maurs
- Location within France Location within Auvergne-Rhône-Alpes
- Coordinates: 44°39′06″N 2°13′01″E
- Country: France
- Region: Auvergne-Rhône-Alpes
- Department: Cantal
- Arrondissement: Aurillac
- Canton: Maurs

Government
  - Mayor (2020–2026): Jean-Luc Broussal
- Area^{1}: 14.52 km^{2} (5.61 sq mi)
- Highest elevation: 487 m (1,598 ft)
- Lowest elevation: 233 m (764 ft)
- Population (2023): 366
  - Density: 25.2/km^{2} (65.3/sq mi)
- Time zone: UTC+01:00 (CET)
  - Summer (DST): UTC+02:00 (CEST)
- INSEE/Postal code: 15212 /15600
- ^{1} French Land Register data, which excludes lakes, ponds, glaciers > 1 km^{2} (0.386 sq mi or 247 acres) and river estuaries.

Saint-Santin-de-Maurs (French pronunciation: [sɛ̃ sɑ̃tɛ̃ də mɔʁs], literally Saint-Santin of Maurs; Languedocien: Sant Santin de Maurs) is a commune in the Cantal department in south-central France.

Since the French revolution, the town of Saint-Santin has been split in two communes in two different departments, Saint-Santin d'Aveyron in the department of Aveyron and Saint-Santin-de-Maurs.

== Population ==
Historical population
Year	Pop.	±% p.a.
1968	382	—
1975	401	+0.70%
1982	407	+0.21%
1990	397	−0.31%
1999	340	−1.71%
2007	340	+0.00%
2012	377	+2.09%
2017	356	−1.14%
2023	366	+0.46%
Source: INSEE

== See also ==
- Communes of the Cantal department
