= Saint Flora =

Saint Flora or St. Flora may refer to:

- Flora of Beaulieu, French Saint
- Flora of Córdoba, Spanish Saint
