= Saint-Étienne-de-Maurs =

Commune in Auvergne-Rhône-Alpes, France

- Commune
- Location of Saint-Étienne-de-Maurs
- Location within France Location within Auvergne-Rhône-Alpes
- Coordinates: 44°43′02″N 2°12′27″E
- Country: France
- Region: Auvergne-Rhône-Alpes
- Department: Cantal
- Arrondissement: Aurillac
- Canton: Maurs

Government
  - Mayor (2020–2026): Michel Fel
- Area^{1}: 17.27 km^{2} (6.67 sq mi)
- Elevation: 262 m (860 ft)
- Highest elevation: 550 m (1,800 ft)
- Lowest elevation: 252 m (827 ft)
- Population (2023): 763
  - Density: 44.2/km^{2} (114/sq mi)
- Time zone: UTC+01:00 (CET)
  - Summer (DST): UTC+02:00 (CEST)
- INSEE/Postal code: 15184 /15600
- ^{1} French Land Register data, which excludes lakes, ponds, glaciers > 1 km^{2} (0.386 sq mi or 247 acres) and river estuaries.

Saint-Étienne-de-Maurs (French pronunciation: [sɛ̃.t‿etjɛn də mɔʁs], literally Saint-Étienne of Maurs; Languedocien: Sant Estève de Maurs) is a commune in the Cantal department in south-central France.

== Population ==
Historical population
Year	Pop.	±% p.a.
1968	516	—
1975	525	+0.25%
1982	658	+3.28%
1990	674	+0.30%
1999	622	−0.89%
2007	732	+2.06%
2012	792	+1.59%
2017	784	−0.20%
2023	763	−0.45%
Source: INSEE

== See also ==
- Communes of the Cantal department
