= Saint-Constant, Cantal =

Saint-Constant
- Part of Saint-Constant-Fournoulès
- Location of Saint-Constant
- Location within France Location within Auvergne-Rhône-Alpes
- Coordinates: 44°41′08″N 2°13′55″E
- Country: France
- Region: Auvergne-Rhône-Alpes
- Department: Cantal
- Arrondissement: Aurillac
- Canton: Maurs
- Commune: Saint-Constant-Fournoulès
- Area^{1}: 21.8 km^{2} (8.4 sq mi)
- Elevation: 256 m (840 ft)
- Highest elevation: 524 m (1,719 ft)
- Lowest elevation: 251 m (823 ft)
- Population (2022): 507
  - Density: 23.3/km^{2} (60.2/sq mi)
- Time zone: UTC+01:00 (CET)
  - Summer (DST): UTC+02:00 (CEST)
- Postal code: 15600
- ^{1} French Land Register data, which excludes lakes, ponds, glaciers > 1 km^{2} (0.386 sq mi or 247 acres) and river estuaries.

Saint-Constant (French pronunciation: [sɛ̃ kɔ̃stɑ̃]; Languedocien: Sant Constant) is a former commune in the Cantal department in south-central France. On 1 January 2016, it was merged into the new commune Saint-Constant-Fournoulès.

== Population ==
Historical population

Year	Pop.	±% p.a.
1793	896	—
1800	926	+0.47%
1806	957	+0.55%
1821	902	−0.39%
1831	1,022	+1.26%
1836	1,112	+1.70%
1841	1,141	+0.52%
1846	1,220	+1.35%
1851	1,193	−0.45%
1856	1,127	−1.13%
1861	1,100	−0.48%
1866	1,088	−0.22%
1872	1,089	+0.02%
1876	1,049	−0.93%
1881	1,011	−0.74%
1886	1,024	+0.26%
1891	1,062	+0.73%
1896	978	−1.63%

Year	Pop.	±% p.a.
1901	927	−1.07%
1906	942	+0.32%
1911	905	−0.80%
1921	842	−0.72%
1926	796	−1.12%
1931	780	−0.41%
1936	786	+0.15%
1946	786	+0.00%
1954	777	−0.14%
1962	727	−0.83%
1968	704	−0.53%
1975	703	−0.02%
1982	689	−0.29%
1990	659	−0.55%
1999	553	−1.93%
2006	594	+1.03%
2022	507	−0.98%

Source: EHESS and INSEE (2022)

== See also ==
- Communes of the Cantal department
