= Quézac =

Quézac is the name of two communes in France:

- Quézac, in the Cantal department
- Quézac, in the Lozère department
