= Fournoulès =

Commune in Cantal, France

- Part of Saint-Constant-Fournoulès
- Location of Fournoulès
- Location within France Location within Auvergne-Rhône-Alpes
- Coordinates: 44°40′37″N 2°16′38″E
- Country: France
- Region: Auvergne-Rhône-Alpes
- Department: Cantal
- Arrondissement: Aurillac
- Canton: Maurs
- Commune: Saint-Constant-Fournoulès
- Area^{1}: 7.18 km^{2} (2.77 sq mi)
- Elevation: 400 m (1,300 ft)
- Highest elevation: 604 m (1,982 ft)
- Lowest elevation: 291 m (955 ft)
- Population (2023): 57
  - Density: 7.9/km^{2} (21/sq mi)
- Time zone: UTC+01:00 (CET)
  - Summer (DST): UTC+02:00 (CEST)
- Postal code: 15600
- ^{1} French Land Register data, which excludes lakes, ponds, glaciers > 1 km^{2} (0.386 sq mi or 247 acres) and river estuaries.

Fournoulès (French pronunciation: [fuʁnulɛs]; Languedocien: Fornolés) is a former commune in the département of Cantal in south-central France. On 1 January 2016, it was merged into the new commune Saint-Constant-Fournoulès.

== See also ==
- Communes of the Cantal department
