= Saint-Constant-Fournoulès =

Commune in Auvergne-Rhône-Alpes, France

- Commune
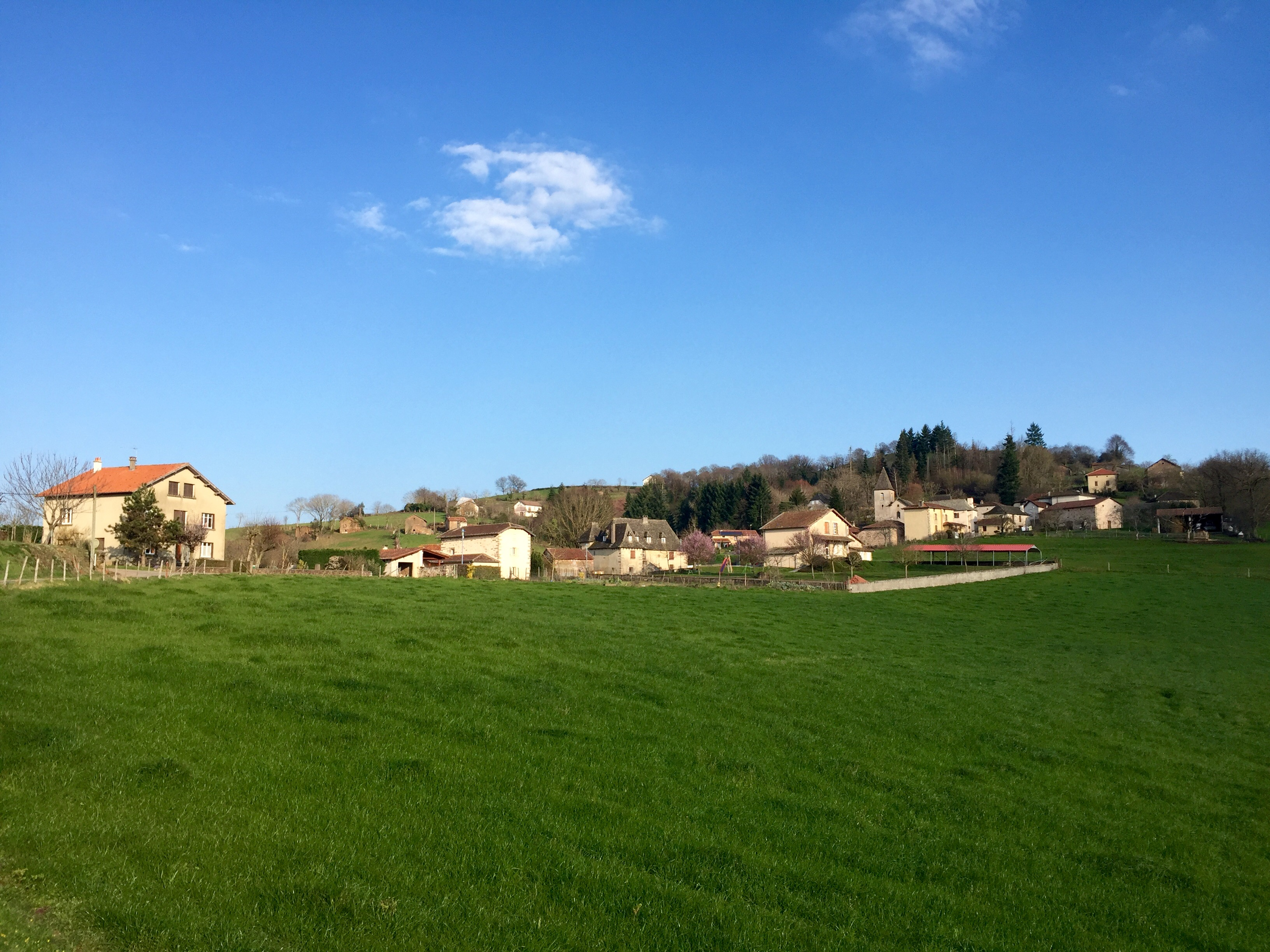
- A general view of Fournoulès
- Location of Saint-Constant-Fournoulès
- Location within France Location within Auvergne-Rhône-Alpes
- Coordinates: 44°41′06″N 2°13′52″E
- Country: France
- Region: Auvergne-Rhône-Alpes
- Department: Cantal
- Arrondissement: Aurillac
- Canton: Maurs

Government
  - Mayor (2020–2026): François Barrierre
- Area^{1}: 28.98 km^{2} (11.19 sq mi)
- Population (2023): 579
  - Density: 20.0/km^{2} (51.7/sq mi)
- Time zone: UTC+01:00 (CET)
  - Summer (DST): UTC+02:00 (CEST)
- INSEE/Postal code: 15181 /15600
- ^{1} French Land Register data, which excludes lakes, ponds, glaciers > 1 km^{2} (0.386 sq mi or 247 acres) and river estuaries.

Saint-Constant-Fournoulès (French pronunciation: [sɛ̃ kɔ̃stɑ̃ fuʁnulɛs]; Languedocien: Sant Constant e Fornolés) is a commune in the Cantal department of southern France. The municipality was established on 1 January 2016 and consists of the former communes of Saint-Constant and Fournoulès.

== See also ==
- Communes of the Cantal department
