= Leynhac =

Commune in Auvergne-Rhône-Alpes, France

- Commune
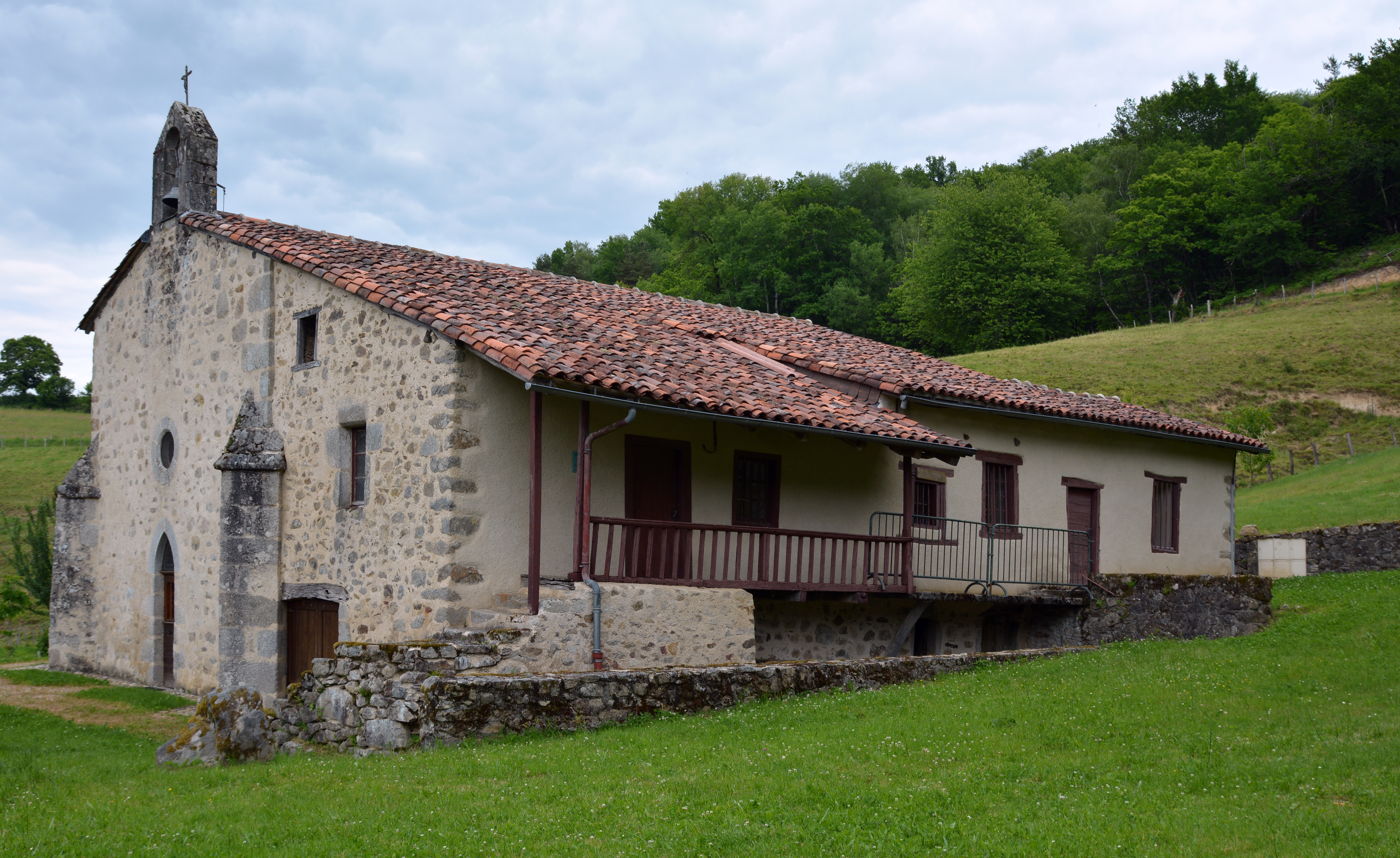
- The priory of Our Lady of the Bridge
- Location of Leynhac
- Location within France Location within Auvergne-Rhône-Alpes
- Coordinates: 44°44′28″N 2°18′03″E
- Country: France
- Region: Auvergne-Rhône-Alpes
- Department: Cantal
- Arrondissement: Aurillac
- Canton: Maurs
- Intercommunality: Châtaigneraie Cantalienne

Government
  - Mayor (2020–2026): Laurent Picarougne
- Area^{1}: 27.68 km^{2} (10.69 sq mi)
- Elevation: 480 m (1,570 ft)
- Highest elevation: 652 m (2,139 ft)
- Lowest elevation: 275 m (902 ft)
- Population (2023): 297
  - Density: 10.7/km^{2} (27.8/sq mi)
- Time zone: UTC+01:00 (CET)
  - Summer (DST): UTC+02:00 (CEST)
- INSEE/Postal code: 15104 /15600
- ^{1} French Land Register data, which excludes lakes, ponds, glaciers > 1 km^{2} (0.386 sq mi or 247 acres) and river estuaries.

Leynhac is a commune in the Cantal department in south-central France.

== Population ==
Historical population
Year	Pop.	±% p.a.
1968	656	—
1975	609	−1.06%
1982	518	−2.29%
1990	441	−1.99%
1999	386	−1.47%
2007	359	−0.90%
2012	361	+0.11%
2017	343	−1.02%
2023	297	−2.37%
Source: INSEE

== See also ==
- Communes of the Cantal department
