= Marcolès =

Commune in Auvergne-Rhône-Alpes, France

- Commune
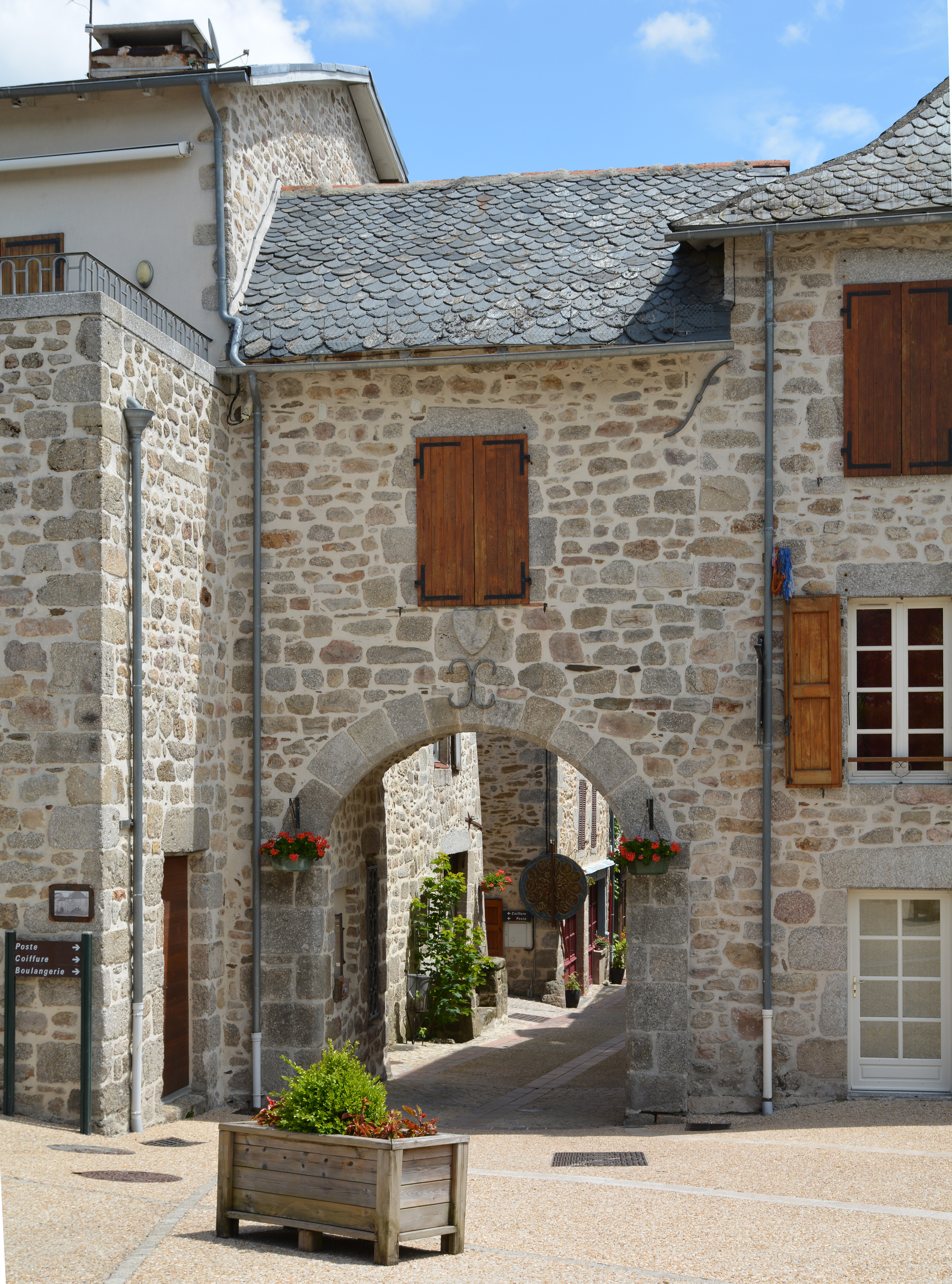
- The village gate

- Coat of arms
- Location of Marcolès
- Location within France Location within Auvergne-Rhône-Alpes
- Coordinates: 44°46′59″N 2°21′13″E
- Country: France
- Region: Auvergne-Rhône-Alpes
- Department: Cantal
- Arrondissement: Aurillac
- Canton: Maurs

Government
  - Mayor (2020–2026): Christian Montin
- Area^{1}: 52.89 km^{2} (20.42 sq mi)
- Elevation: 710 m (2,330 ft)
- Highest elevation: 828 m (2,717 ft)
- Lowest elevation: 427 m (1,401 ft)
- Population (2023): 600
  - Density: 11/km^{2} (29/sq mi)
- Time zone: UTC+01:00 (CET)
  - Summer (DST): UTC+02:00 (CEST)
- INSEE/Postal code: 15117 /15220
- ^{1} French Land Register data, which excludes lakes, ponds, glaciers > 1 km^{2} (0.386 sq mi or 247 acres) and river estuaries.

Marcolès (French pronunciation: [maʁkɔlɛs]; Occitan: Marcolés) is a commune in the Cantal department in south-central France.

== Population ==
Historical population
Year	Pop.	±% p.a.
1968	807	—
1975	721	−1.60%
1982	654	−1.38%
1990	622	−0.63%
1999	577	−0.83%
2007	608	+0.66%
2012	594	−0.46%
2017	595	+0.03%
2023	600	+0.14%
Source: INSEE

== See also ==
- Communes of the Cantal department
