= Rouziers =

Commune in Auvergne-Rhône-Alpes, France

- Commune
- Location of Rouziers
- Location within France Location within Auvergne-Rhône-Alpes
- Coordinates: 44°47′39″N 2°12′34″E
- Country: France
- Region: Auvergne-Rhône-Alpes
- Department: Cantal
- Arrondissement: Aurillac
- Canton: Maurs

Government
  - Mayor (2020–2026): Denis Vieyres
- Area^{1}: 8.61 km^{2} (3.32 sq mi)
- Elevation: 538 m (1,765 ft)
- Highest elevation: 594 m (1,949 ft)
- Lowest elevation: 349 m (1,145 ft)
- Population (2023): 107
  - Density: 12.4/km^{2} (32.2/sq mi)
- Time zone: UTC+01:00 (CET)
  - Summer (DST): UTC+02:00 (CEST)
- INSEE/Postal code: 15167 /15600
- ^{1} French Land Register data, which excludes lakes, ponds, glaciers > 1 km^{2} (0.386 sq mi or 247 acres) and river estuaries.

Rouziers (French pronunciation: [ʁuzje]; Occitan: Rogièr) is a commune in the Cantal department in south-central France.

== Population ==
Historical population
Year	Pop.	±% p.a.
1968	193	—
1975	185	−0.60%
1982	142	−3.71%
1990	119	−2.18%
1999	122	+0.28%
2007	129	+0.70%
2012	133	+0.61%
2017	121	−1.87%
2023	107	−2.03%
Source: INSEE

== See also ==
- Communes of the Cantal department
