= Saint-Antoine, Cantal =

Commune in Auvergne-Rhône-Alpes, France

Saint-Antoine
- Commune
- Location of Saint-Antoine
- Location within France Location within Auvergne-Rhône-Alpes
- Coordinates: 44°45′05″N 2°20′18″E
- Country: France
- Region: Auvergne-Rhône-Alpes
- Department: Cantal
- Arrondissement: Aurillac
- Canton: Maurs

Government
  - Mayor (2020–2026): Claude Robert
- Area^{1}: 7.22 km^{2} (2.79 sq mi)
- Elevation: 700 m (2,300 ft)
- Highest elevation: 702 m (2,303 ft)
- Lowest elevation: 485 m (1,591 ft)
- Population (2023): 84
  - Density: 12/km^{2} (30/sq mi)
- Time zone: UTC+01:00 (CET)
  - Summer (DST): UTC+02:00 (CEST)
- INSEE/Postal code: 15172 /15220
- ^{1} French Land Register data, which excludes lakes, ponds, glaciers > 1 km^{2} (0.386 sq mi or 247 acres) and river estuaries.

Saint-Antoine (French pronunciation: [sɛ̃.t‿ɑ̃twan]; Occitan: Sant Antòni) is a commune in the Cantal department in south-central France.

== Population ==
Historical population
Year	Pop.	±% p.a.
1968	160	—
1975	132	−2.71%
1982	145	+1.35%
1990	135	−0.89%
1999	133	−0.17%
2007	120	−1.28%
2012	118	−0.34%
2017	106	−2.12%
2023	84	−3.80%
Source: INSEE

== See also ==
- Communes of the Cantal department
