= Calvinet =

- Part of Puycapel
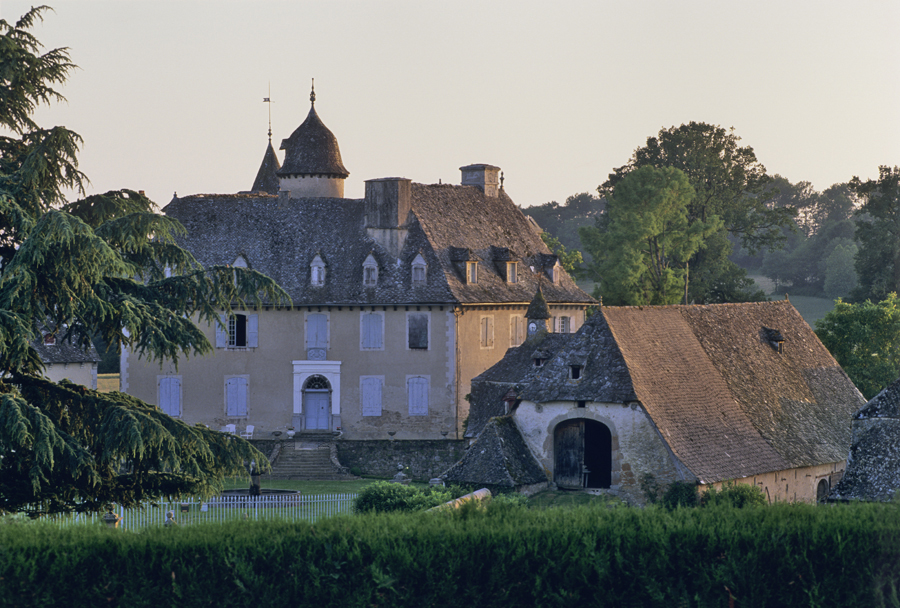
- Chateau of la Mothe

- Coat of arms
- Location of Calvinet
- Location within France Location within Auvergne-Rhône-Alpes
- Coordinates: 44°43′07″N 2°21′30″E
- Country: France
- Region: Auvergne-Rhône-Alpes
- Department: Cantal
- Arrondissement: Aurillac
- Canton: Arpajon-sur-Cère
- Commune: Puycapel
- Area^{1}: 13.73 km^{2} (5.30 sq mi)
- Elevation: 600 m (2,000 ft)
- Highest elevation: 742 m (2,434 ft)
- Lowest elevation: 452 m (1,483 ft)
- Population (2023): 428
  - Density: 31.2/km^{2} (80.7/sq mi)
- Time zone: UTC+01:00 (CET)
  - Summer (DST): UTC+02:00 (CEST)
- Postal code: 15340
- ^{1} French Land Register data, which excludes lakes, ponds, glaciers > 1 km^{2} (0.386 sq mi or 247 acres) and river estuaries.

Calvinet (French pronunciation: [kalvinɛ]) is a former commune in the Cantal department in south-central France. On 1 January 2019, it was merged into the new commune Puycapel.

== See also ==
- Communes of the Cantal department
