= Mourjou =

- Part of Puycapel
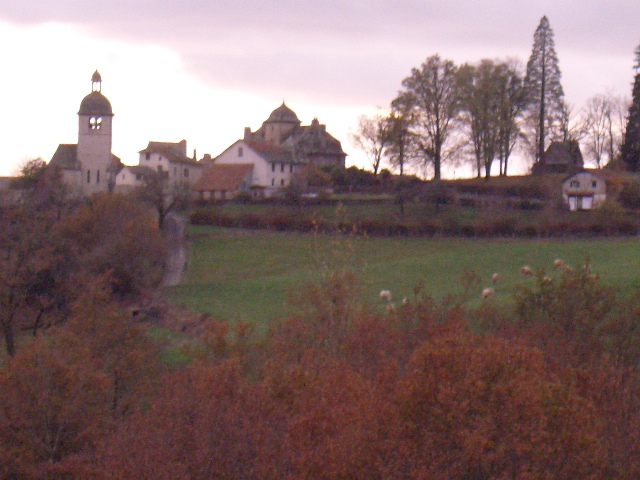
- Mourjou seen from Jalenques, during an autumn evening
- Location of Mourjou
- Location within France Location within Auvergne-Rhône-Alpes
- Coordinates: 44°41′29″N 2°19′48″E
- Country: France
- Region: Auvergne-Rhône-Alpes
- Department: Cantal
- Arrondissement: Aurillac
- Canton: Maurs
- Commune: Puycapel
- Area^{1}: 29.99 km^{2} (11.58 sq mi)
- Elevation: 480 m (1,570 ft)
- Highest elevation: 663 m (2,175 ft)
- Lowest elevation: 294 m (965 ft)
- Population (2023): 289
  - Density: 9.64/km^{2} (25.0/sq mi)
- Time zone: UTC+01:00 (CET)
  - Summer (DST): UTC+02:00 (CEST)
- Postal code: 15340
- ^{1} French Land Register data, which excludes lakes, ponds, glaciers > 1 km^{2} (0.386 sq mi or 247 acres) and river estuaries.

Mourjou (French pronunciation: [muʁʒu]; Languedocien: Morjon, or Morjó) is a former commune in the Cantal department in south-central France. On 1 January 2019, it was merged into the new commune Puycapel. A chestnut fair is held annually during the third weekend of October.

The village is home to the Maison de la Chataigne, a museum dedicated to the chestnut: its history, its cultivation and harvesting, and its consumption. It is open from June to September every day of the week in the afternoon, except Monday.

== See also ==
- Communes of the Cantal department
