= Montmurat =

Commune in Auvergne-Rhône-Alpes, France

- Commune
- Location of Montmurat
- Location within France Location within Auvergne-Rhône-Alpes
- Coordinates: 44°37′48″N 2°12′06″E
- Country: France
- Region: Auvergne-Rhône-Alpes
- Department: Cantal
- Arrondissement: Aurillac
- Canton: Maurs

Government
  - Mayor (2020–2026): Gilbert Domergue
- Area^{1}: 5.07 km^{2} (1.96 sq mi)
- Elevation: 400 m (1,300 ft)
- Highest elevation: 418 m (1,371 ft)
- Lowest elevation: 235 m (771 ft)
- Population (2023): 134
  - Density: 26.4/km^{2} (68.5/sq mi)
- Time zone: UTC+01:00 (CET)
  - Summer (DST): UTC+02:00 (CEST)
- INSEE/Postal code: 15133 /15600
- ^{1} French Land Register data, which excludes lakes, ponds, glaciers > 1 km^{2} (0.386 sq mi or 247 acres) and river estuaries.

Montmurat (French pronunciation: [mɔ̃myʁa]) is a commune in the Cantal department in south-central France.

== Population ==
Historical population
Year	Pop.	±% p.a.
1968	136	—
1975	142	+0.62%
1982	148	+0.59%
1990	116	−3.00%
1999	133	+1.53%
2007	146	+1.17%
2012	129	−2.45%
2017	134	+0.76%
2023	134	+0.00%
Source: INSEE

== See also ==
- Communes of the Cantal department
