= Flora of Beaulieu =

14th-century French Hospitaller nun and Catholic saint

Saint Fleur of Issendolus
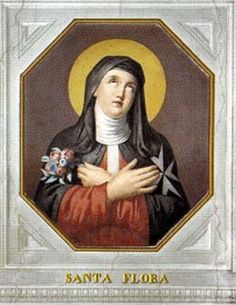
- Saint Fleur

Virgin and religious
- Born: c. 1300; Maurs, Auvergne, Kingdom of France
- Died: 1347; Hôpital-Beaulieu, Issendolus, Quercy, Kingdom of France
- Venerated in: Catholic Church
- Major shrine: Church of Saint-Julien, Issendolus
- Feast: 5 October

Fleur of Issendolus (Flor; died 1347), also known as Fleur of Beaulieu, Sainte Fleur, Saint Flora or Flora of Beaulieu, was a French Hospitaller nun at Hôpital-Beaulieu in Issendolus, in the former province of Quercy. She is venerated as a saint in the Catholic Church and her feast is observed on 5 October.

Fleur is one of the few medieval female saints associated with the Order of Saint John of Jerusalem. Her medieval hagiographic dossier presents her as a visionary and Eucharistic mystic with a Passion-centered spirituality. More than a hundred miracles were attributed to her. Her local cult is attested by the late fourteenth century, although formal recognition by the Catholic Church came only in the nineteenth century.

== Name and sources ==
The medieval vernacular vita gives her name as Flor, in the Quercy form of Occitan. The French forms Fleur and Flore, and the English or Latinised form Flora, derive from this name. Some later devotional sources refer to her as Fleur de Corbie and identify her parents as Pons de Corbie and Melhors de Merle. Modern scholars treat these family names cautiously, since the medieval vita itself gives only the parents' first names and Fleur's place of birth.

Fleur is known principally through a medieval hagiographic dossier consisting of a life and a collection of miracles. The original Latin vita, traditionally attributed to her anonymous confessor, has not survived. A fifteenth-century Occitan version was preserved under the title Vida e miracles de sancta Flor.

The earliest printed account of Fleur appears in the work of the Italian Hospitaller historian Giacomo Bosio. In 1631 Jean Baudoin published a French adaptation of Bosio's collection of saints' lives of the Order of Saint John, including an account of Saint Flora and an engraving depicting her. The Occitan text was copied in 1667 by Jean-François de Doat together with a French translation, and survives in the Collection Doat of the Bibliothèque nationale de France.

In the early modern period, much tradition depended on a free Latin rearrangement by Hugues Amadieu, curé of Saint-Urcisse of Cahors and former confessor of the nuns of Beaulieu. This version was used by the Bollandists in the Acta Sanctorum. The Occitan text was edited and published by the philologist Clovis Brunel in 1946 and reviewed by Jacques Monfrin in 1948. Many modern accounts continued to repeat unsupported legends, chronological errors and genealogical assumptions even after Brunel's edition became available. A critical edition of the Occitan text with notes and glossary was published by Francesca Gambino in 2008.

Fleur died in 1347. The precise day and circumstances of her death are not known. Later writers have sometimes confused the date of her death with 11 June, the day on which her relics were translated in 1360 to the church of Saint-Julien d'Issendolus, an error found in several later devotional accounts.

== Life ==
The medieval Vita states that Fleur was born at Maurs, in present-day Cantal, and that her parents were named Pons and Melhors. It describes her family as noble and says that her parents had ten children, three sons and seven daughters, of whom four daughters became religious women of the Order of Saint John at Beaulieu. Later traditions identify her father as Pons de Corbie and her mother as Melhors de Merle, but these details are not found in the medieval vita itself. Fleur's precise ancestry is unknown.

Fleur's date of birth is also uncertain. Traditional accounts give dates such as about 1300 or 1309, but these depend on later calculations and assumptions about her age at death. The medieval dossier states that she died in 1347 and that she had been in the monastery for at least twenty years and also records the translation of her relics on 11 June 1360. These indications show that she was present at Beaulieu by at least 1327, although she may have entered earlier, perhaps near the beginning of the fourteenth century.

According to the Vita, Fleur showed religious inclinations from childhood. She avoided games and frivolous conversation, remained close to her devout mother, learned to read so that she could say the Hours, and rejected the marriage planned by her father and relatives. Hagiographic tradition says that she entered religious life at about the age of fourteen. She became a nun of the Order of Saint John of Jerusalem at Hôpital-Beaulieu, in the parish of Saint-Julien d'Issendolus and the diocese of Cahors.

Hôpital-Beaulieu stood on the route used by pilgrims travelling from Figeac to Rocamadour. It was not originally founded by the Order of Saint John. It was founded by Guibert de Thémines and his wife Aigline, probably in 1230s, and was given to the Hospitallers in 1259. In 1298 the house received statutes from Guillaume de Villaret, grand master of the order. The statutes fixed the maximum number of professed nuns at thirty-nine and listed thirty-five sisters, apparently the whole community at that date. Beaulieu was therefore one of the most important female Hospitaller houses in medieval France.

Although Catholic devotional sources associate Fleur with the care of the sick and pilgrims, the surviving hagiographic dossier does not show her personally engaged in nursing or in the active care of pilgrims. Her vita instead emphasizes the divine office, sacramental devotion, contemplation and mystical experience.

The vita portrays her early years at Beaulieu as spiritually difficult. She was troubled by the wealth of the house, fearing that material abundance was incompatible with religious poverty. A religious adviser reassured her that such resources could assist those not yet strong in the love of God. The same account describes Fleur as undergoing severe temptations and being misunderstood by other members of the community. Her weeping, ecstatic behavior and movements through the cloister led some sisters and visiting religious men to regard her as mad. The hagiographic narrative then presents her later visions and consolations as divine vindication.

Fleur died at Hôpital-Beaulieu in 1347.

== Spirituality ==
The Vita presents Fleur as a visionary and Eucharistic mystic. Her sanctity combines traditional hagiographic motifs, including noble birth, refusal of marriage, virginity, humility, obedience, abstinence and devotion to the divine office, with forms of affective spirituality characteristic of the later Middle Ages. Fleur's spiritual profile was marked by Franciscan inspiration, especially poverty, penitence and meditation on the Passion of Christ. Her unease at the prosperity of Beaulieu is one sign of this ideal.

Fleur's Passion-centered spirituality is a major theme of the vita. The wounded Christ is said to have appeared to her for about three months under the form of the angel painted before the parlour under the cloister roof. Montagnes compares this image to Franciscan representations of the seraph impressing the wounds of the Passion on Saint Francis. In Fleur's case, however, the suffering is described as inward: she seemed to carry the crucified Christ and the cross within herself, felt the cross pierce her body, and suffered especially in the right side, hands and feet, particularly on Fridays and during Holy Week.

The vita also links Fleur's spiritual life to the Eucharist. It says that she confessed daily and sometimes entered ecstasy after absolution or communion. During Mass, especially at the beginning of the Eucharistic prayer, she is said to have sensed the coming of the heavenly king; after communion she was often unable to return to her place without assistance from two sisters. Her visions are repeatedly connected with the liturgical year, including Christmas, Candlemas, Easter, Ascension, Pentecost, Marian feasts and the feast of Saint Cecilia.

The vita organizes her devotional life around seven themes: confession, the sacrament of the altar, the Passion, the divine office, the Incarnation and redemption, devotion to the saints, and the desire for heavenly glory. Her spiritual experience is described in strongly sensory language, emphasizing sweetness, melody, taste, smell, brightness and perfume. The text also gives unusual symbolic visions, including an angelic sword, a golden cup, a tree reaching from earth to heaven, an eagle with wings outstretched in the form of a cross, and a brilliant stone in which she contemplated the order of angels and the elect.

== Miracles and cult ==
The miracle collection edited by Brunel contains 109 numbered articles, although the final articles concern miracles performed during Fleur's lifetime. The posthumous miracles are not arranged in chronological, geographical or thematic order. On the basis of the few chronological markers, Montagnes dates the collection to the last third of the fifteenth century and sees it as evidence for a pilgrimage to Fleur's tomb at Hôpital-Beaulieu lasting about a century.

The miracle stories show sixty-nine clear healings, six safe childbirths, two conceptions granted to women seeking children, and one healing of spiritual affliction. Other miracles concerned protection from English troops or armed men during the Hundred Years' War. About fifteen miracles record suffering caused by the English and by armed men in Quercy, including pillage, capture, ransom, devastation of property and threats to fortified places. In this respect, her posthumous cult responded not only to illness but also to the insecurity of rural society during the Hundred Years' War. Fleur was also invoked for infectious diseases, fevers, pains, paralysis, wounds, fractures, accidents, blindness, deafness, muteness, neurological disorders including epilepsy, difficult childbirths and sterility.

The cult had a marked female dimension. In the miracle collection, women are favoured more often than men among the identifiable beneficiaries, and several cases concern pregnancy, childbirth or the survival of mother and child. Men of noble status, religious men and donors of the Hospital also appear among the beneficiaries.

Geographically, the cult was concentrated around Beaulieu. Most miracles occurred at the hospital itself or within about ten kilometers. A wider local zone extended to Gourdon, Fieux, Loubressac, Figeac, Corn and Faycelles, while more distant cases are recorded from Cahors, Montpellier, Maurs, Sarlat, Limoges, Saintes and Gascony. The distribution followed regional routes, especially the road from Figeac to Rocamadour.

Fleur is commemorated in the Catholic church on 5 October. Her cult has been especially associated with Issendolus, Maurs and the memory of the Hospitaller women of Beaulieu.

The saint’s relics were taken to the Hôpital-Beaulieu in 1360. In 1793, revolutionaries set fire to the hospital, desecrating and burning her relics. The skull and a tibia were saved. In 1866, the Bishop of Cahors had them placed in the church of Issendolus. A reliquary containing relics of Saint Fleur is preserved in the parish church of Saint-Julien at Issendolus. The object, an ostensorium-shaped reliquary in gilt metal and glass dating from the late nineteenth or early twentieth century, was listed as a French protected movable heritage object in 1984.

Formal recognition of Fleur's cult by the Catholic Church came in the nineteenth century. Her veneration was approved in 1852 by Pope Pius IX and she was inscribed in the Roman Martyrology with a feast day on 5 October. The process of recognition drew on the hagiographic tradition. transmitted through the Acta Sanctorum and on the continued local devotion at Issendolus and Maurs. Her beatification was proposed as a "confirmation of veneration" ("de confirmatione cultus").

== Bibliography ==
- Albe, Edmond (1941). "Les religieuses hospitalières de l'ordre de Saint-Jean de Jérusalem au diocèse de Cahors". Revue d'histoire de l'Église de France (in French). 27 (112): 180–220. doi:10.3406/rhef.1941.2921.
- Amadieu, Hugues (1715). "De beata Flora seu Flore" (PDF). Acta Sanctorum (in Latin). Vol. Junius VI, appendix. Antwerp: Société des Bollandistes. pp. 97–119.
- Baudoin, Jean (1631). "De la bienheurese Saincte Flore, Religieuse de l'Ordre de Sainct-Jean de Hierusalem". Les vies de saincts et des sainctes de l'Ordre de Sainct-Jean de Jérusalem, traduites de l'italien du sieur Bosio (in French). Paris. pp. 133–139.
- Brunel, Clovis (1946). "Vida e miracles de sancta Flor". Analecta Bollandiana (in Occitan). 64 (1–2). Brussels: Société des Bollandistes: 5–49. doi:10.1484/J.ABOL.4.02212.
- Bynum, Caroline Walker (1991). "Women Mystics and Eucharistic Devotion in the Thirteenth Century". Fragmentation and Redemption: Essays on Gender and the Human Body in Medieval Religion. New York: Zone Books. pp. 119–150. ISBN 978-0-942299-63-2.
- Bom, Myra Miranda (2012). Women in the Military Orders of the Crusades. The New Middle Ages. New York: Palgrave Macmillan. doi:10.1057/9781137088307. ISBN 978-0-230-11413-5.
- "Sainte Fleur (+1347)". Église catholique en France (in French). Conférence des évêques de France.
- Doat, Jean-François de (1667). "Vida e miracles de sancta Flor" (Document). Bibliothèque nationale de France. Collection Doat, ms. 123. See Lacarrière 1871
- Galimard Flavigny, Bertrand (2006). Histoire de l'Ordre de Malte (in French). Paris: Perrin. pp. 315–316. ISBN 978-2-262-02115-3.
- Gambino, Francesca (2008). "Vita e miracoli di santa Flora di Beaulieu. Edizione del testo provenzale con note e glossario". Zeitschrift für romanische Philologie (in Italian). 124 (3): 418–513. doi:10.1515/ZRPH.2008.046.
- Lacarrière, Cyprien (1871). Vie de sainte Flore ou Fleur : vierge de l'ordre de Saint-Jean de Jérusalem, à l'Hôpital-Beaulieu en Quercy, aujourd'hui l'Hôpital-Issendolus : diocèse de Cahors (Lot) : extrait des Bollandistes (in French) (2nd ed.). Cahors.
- L’Hermite-Leclercq, Paulette (2006). "Fleur de Beaulieu (d. 1347), Saint of the Hospital of Saint John of Jerusalem". In Luttrell, Anthony; Nicholson, Helen J. (eds.). Hospitaller Women in the Middle Ages. Ashgate. pp. 209–231. doi:10.4324/9781315253213-8. ISBN 978-1-315-25321-3.
- Mattalia, Yoan (2021). "Beaulieu, une maison féminine de l'Ordre de l'Hôpital de Saint-Jean de Jérusalem dans le diocèse de Cahors (XIIIe-XIVe siècles)". Annales du Midi (in French). 133 (315–316): 509–534. doi:10.3406/anami.2021.9100.
- Monfrin, Jacques (1948). "C. Brunel. Vida e miracles de sancta Flor. Bruxelles, 1946. Extrait des Analecta Bollandiana, t. LXIV, fasc. I et II, 1946". Bibliothèque de l'École des chartes (in French). 107 (1): 128–129.
- Montagnes, Bernard (2006). "Une sainte quercynoise de l'ordre de l'Hôpital : sainte Fleur († 1347)". Les ordres religieux militaires dans le Midi (XIIe-XIVe siècle). Cahiers de Fanjeaux (in French). Vol. 41. Toulouse: Éditions Privat. pp. 115–135. doi:10.3406/cafan.2006.1893.
- "Sainte Fleur". Nominis (in French). Conférence des évêques de France.
- "Reliquaire : sainte Fleur". POP: la plateforme ouverte du patrimoine (in French). Ministry of Culture (France). Palissy IM46206273.
- Association Patrimoine Matériel et Immatériel de l’Hôpital-Beaulieu, Issendolus et Ste Fleur (28 May 2023). "L'église saint Julien d'Issendolus". Patrimoine Issendolus (in French).
- "Sancta Flor: Premessa". Repertorio informatizzato dell’antica letteratura trobadorica e occitana (in Italian).
- "Día 5 de octubre". Martirologio Romano (in Spanish). Libreria Editrice Vaticana. 2004.
- Sabourdin-Perrin, Dominique (2025). Vie de sainte Fleur (in French). Salvator. ISBN 978-2-7067-3008-5.
