= Le Trioulou =

Commune in Auvergne-Rhône-Alpes, France

- Commune
- Location of Le Trioulou
- Location within France Location within Auvergne-Rhône-Alpes
- Coordinates: 44°40′10″N 2°11′19″E
- Country: France
- Region: Auvergne-Rhône-Alpes
- Department: Cantal
- Arrondissement: Aurillac
- Canton: Maurs

Government
  - Mayor (2020–2026): Geneviève Marquet
- Area^{1}: 5.87 km^{2} (2.27 sq mi)
- Elevation: 390 m (1,280 ft)
- Highest elevation: 403 m (1,322 ft)
- Lowest elevation: 234 m (768 ft)
- Population (2023): 95
  - Density: 16/km^{2} (42/sq mi)
- Time zone: UTC+01:00 (CET)
  - Summer (DST): UTC+02:00 (CEST)
- INSEE/Postal code: 15242 /15600
- ^{1} French Land Register data, which excludes lakes, ponds, glaciers > 1 km^{2} (0.386 sq mi or 247 acres) and river estuaries.

Le Trioulou (French pronunciation: [lə tʁijulu]) is a commune in the Cantal department in south-central France.

== Population ==
Historical population
Year	Pop.	±% p.a.
1968	191	—
1975	165	−2.07%
1982	138	−2.52%
1990	127	−1.03%
1999	99	−2.73%
2007	95	−0.51%
2012	99	+0.83%
2017	103	+0.80%
2023	95	−1.34%
Source: INSEE

== See also ==
- Communes of the Cantal department
