= Vitrac, Cantal =

Commune in Auvergne-Rhône-Alpes, France

Vitrac
- Commune
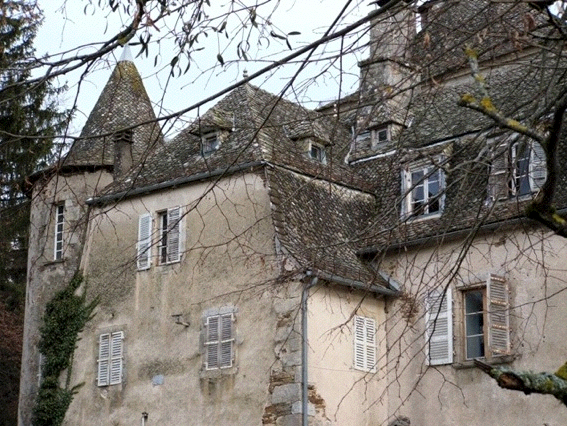
- The Chateau de Fargues, in Vitrac
- Location of Vitrac
- Location within France Location within Auvergne-Rhône-Alpes
- Coordinates: 44°48′58″N 2°18′56″E
- Country: France
- Region: Auvergne-Rhône-Alpes
- Department: Cantal
- Arrondissement: Aurillac
- Canton: Maurs

Government
  - Mayor (2020–2026): Marie-Paule Bouquier
- Area^{1}: 17.88 km^{2} (6.90 sq mi)
- Elevation: 550 m (1,800 ft)
- Highest elevation: 786 m (2,579 ft)
- Lowest elevation: 444 m (1,457 ft)
- Population (2023): 268
  - Density: 15.0/km^{2} (38.8/sq mi)
- Time zone: UTC+01:00 (CET)
  - Summer (DST): UTC+02:00 (CEST)
- INSEE/Postal code: 15264 /15220
- ^{1} French Land Register data, which excludes lakes, ponds, glaciers > 1 km^{2} (0.386 sq mi or 247 acres) and river estuaries.

Vitrac (French pronunciation: [vitʁak]) is a commune in the Cantal department in south-central France.

== Population ==
Historical population
Year	Pop.	±% p.a.
1968	409	—
1975	404	−0.18%
1982	347	−2.15%
1990	294	−2.05%
1999	277	−0.66%
2007	294	+0.75%
2012	269	−1.76%
2017	265	−0.30%
2023	268	+0.19%
Source: INSEE

== See also ==
- Communes of the Cantal department
