= Saint-Julien-de-Toursac =

Commune in Auvergne-Rhône-Alpes, France

- Commune
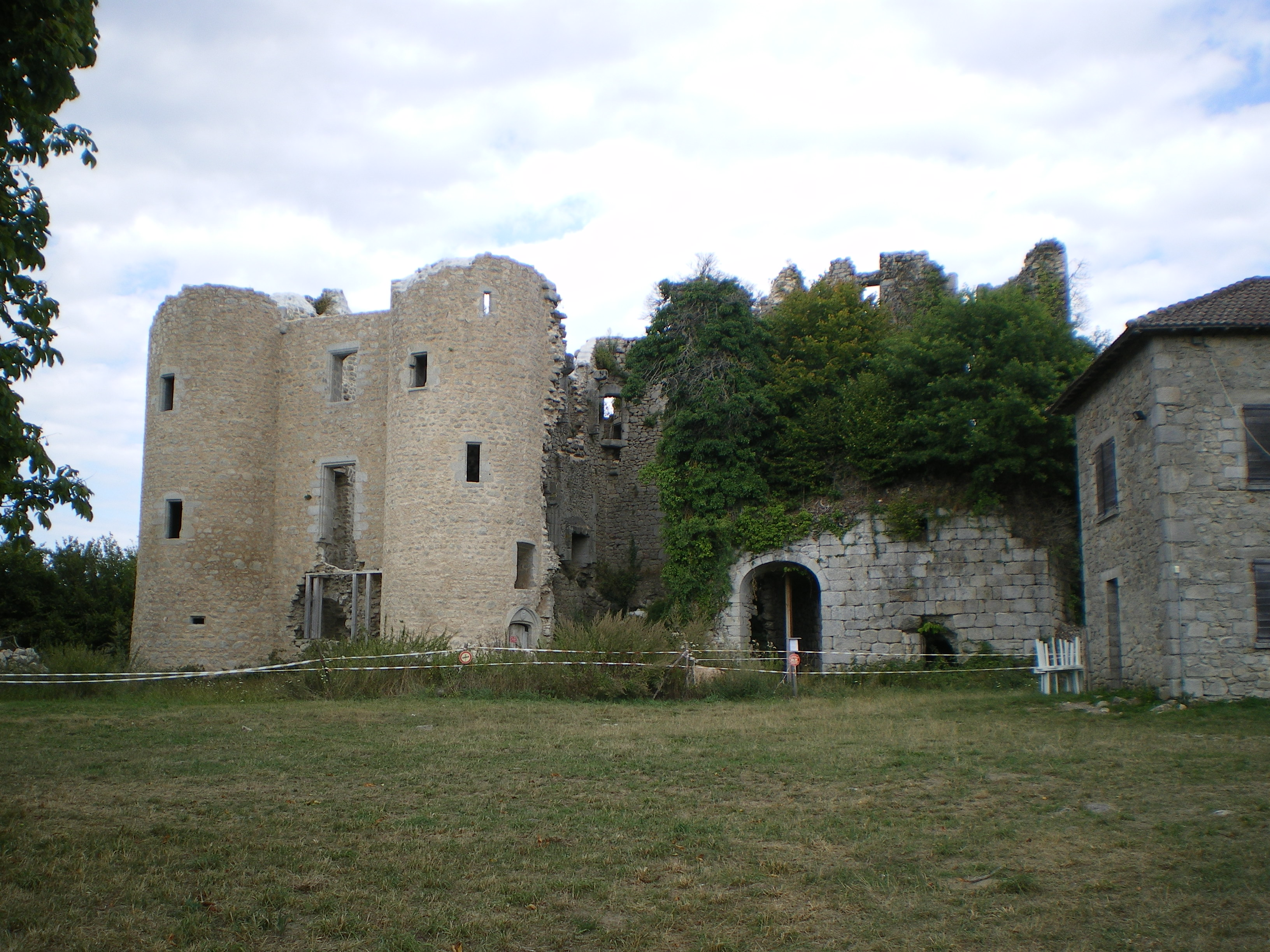
- Ruins of the Chateau of Naucaze
- Location of Saint-Julien-de-Toursac
- Location within France Location within Auvergne-Rhône-Alpes
- Coordinates: 44°46′29″N 2°12′37″E
- Country: France
- Region: Auvergne-Rhône-Alpes
- Department: Cantal
- Arrondissement: Aurillac
- Canton: Maurs

Government
  - Mayor (2020–2026): Denis Sabot
- Area^{1}: 9.44 km^{2} (3.64 sq mi)
- Elevation: 498 m (1,634 ft)
- Highest elevation: 582 m (1,909 ft)
- Lowest elevation: 270 m (890 ft)
- Population (2023): 103
  - Density: 10.9/km^{2} (28.3/sq mi)
- Time zone: UTC+01:00 (CET)
  - Summer (DST): UTC+02:00 (CEST)
- INSEE/Postal code: 15194 /15600
- ^{1} French Land Register data, which excludes lakes, ponds, glaciers > 1 km^{2} (0.386 sq mi or 247 acres) and river estuaries.

Saint-Julien-de-Toursac (French pronunciation: [sɛ̃ ʒyljɛ̃ də tuʁsak]; Languedocien: Sant Julien de Toursac) is a commune in the Cantal department in south-central France.

== Population ==
Historical population
Year	Pop.	±% p.a.
1968	183	—
1975	148	−2.99%
1982	115	−3.54%
1990	116	+0.11%
1999	105	−1.10%
2007	137	+3.38%
2012	135	−0.29%
2017	113	−3.50%
2023	103	−1.53%
Source: INSEE

== See also ==
- Communes of the Cantal department
