= Issendolus =

French commune

- Commune
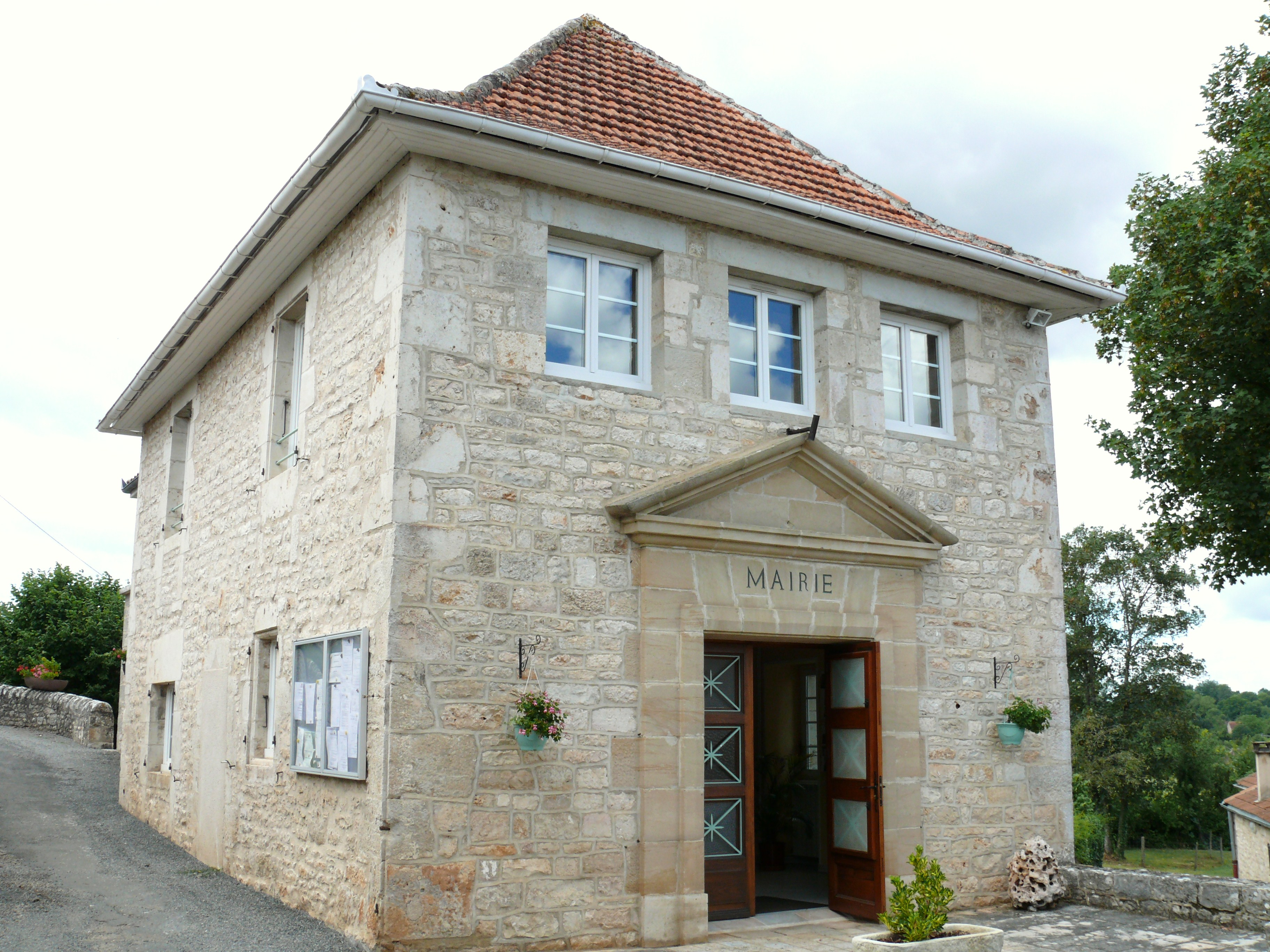
- The town hall in Issendolus

- Coat of arms
- Location of Issendolus
- Location within France Location within Occitanie
- Coordinates: 44°44′36″N 1°47′19″E
- Country: France
- Region: Occitania
- Department: Lot
- Arrondissement: Figeac
- Canton: Gramat
- Intercommunality: Grand-Figeac

Government
  - Mayor (2020–2026): Eric Dubarry
- Area^{1}: 18.91 km^{2} (7.30 sq mi)
- Elevation: 350 m (1,150 ft)
- Highest elevation: 373 m (1,224 ft)
- Lowest elevation: 300 m (980 ft)
- Population (2023): 529
  - Density: 28.0/km^{2} (72.5/sq mi)
- Time zone: UTC+01:00 (CET)
  - Summer (DST): UTC+02:00 (CEST)
- INSEE/Postal code: 46132 /46500
- ^{1} French Land Register data, which excludes lakes, ponds, glaciers > 1 km^{2} (0.386 sq mi or 247 acres) and river estuaries.

Issendolus is a commune in the Lot department in south-western France.

Saint Fleur of Issendolus (died 1347) was a French Hospitaller nun at Hôpital-Beaulieu in Issendolus.

== See also ==
- Communes of the Lot department
