= Roannes-Saint-Mary =

Commune in Auvergne-Rhône-Alpes, France

- Commune
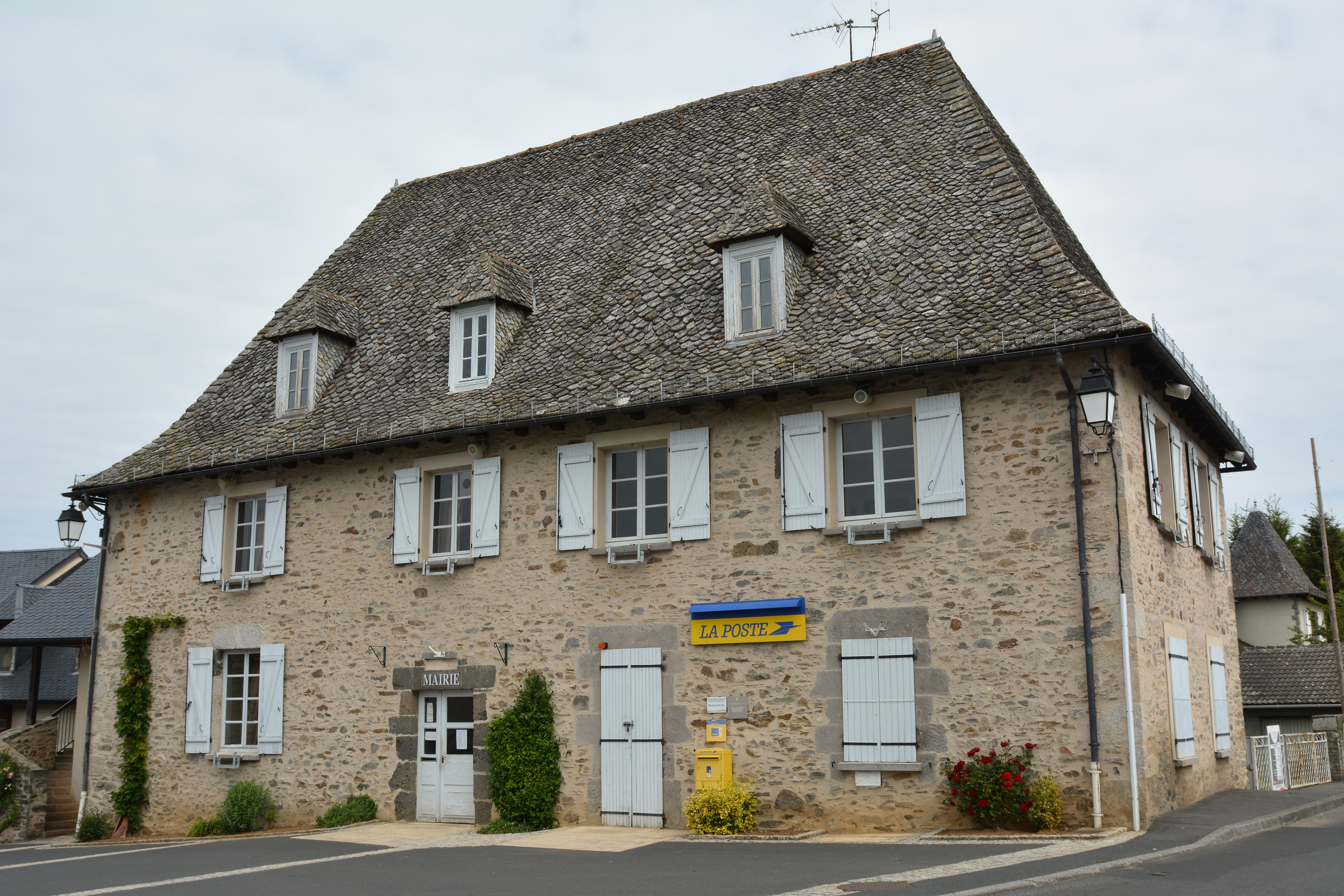
- The town hall in Roannes-Saint-Mary
- Location of Roannes-Saint-Mary
- Location within France Location within Auvergne-Rhône-Alpes
- Coordinates: 44°51′28″N 2°23′29″E
- Country: France
- Region: Auvergne-Rhône-Alpes
- Department: Cantal
- Arrondissement: Aurillac
- Canton: Maurs

Government
  - Mayor (2020–2026): Géraud Meral
- Area^{1}: 35.36 km^{2} (13.65 sq mi)
- Elevation: 620 m (2,030 ft)
- Highest elevation: 804 m (2,638 ft)
- Lowest elevation: 560 m (1,840 ft)
- Population (2023): 1,101
  - Density: 31.14/km^{2} (80.64/sq mi)
- Time zone: UTC+01:00 (CET)
  - Summer (DST): UTC+02:00 (CEST)
- INSEE/Postal code: 15163 /15220
- ^{1} French Land Register data, which excludes lakes, ponds, glaciers > 1 km^{2} (0.386 sq mi or 247 acres) and river estuaries.

Roannes-Saint-Mary (French pronunciation: [ʁɔan sɛ̃ maʁi]; Occitan: Roana de Sant Mari) is a commune in the Cantal department in south-central France.

== Population ==
Historical population
Year	Pop.	±% p.a.
1968	780	—
1975	756	−0.45%
1982	928	+2.97%
1990	939	+0.15%
1999	908	−0.37%
2007	960	+0.70%
2012	1,034	+1.50%
2017	1,088	+1.02%
2023	1,101	+0.20%
Source: INSEE

== See also ==
- Communes of the Cantal department
