= Saint-Mamet-la-Salvetat =

Commune in Auvergne-Rhône-Alpes, France

- Commune
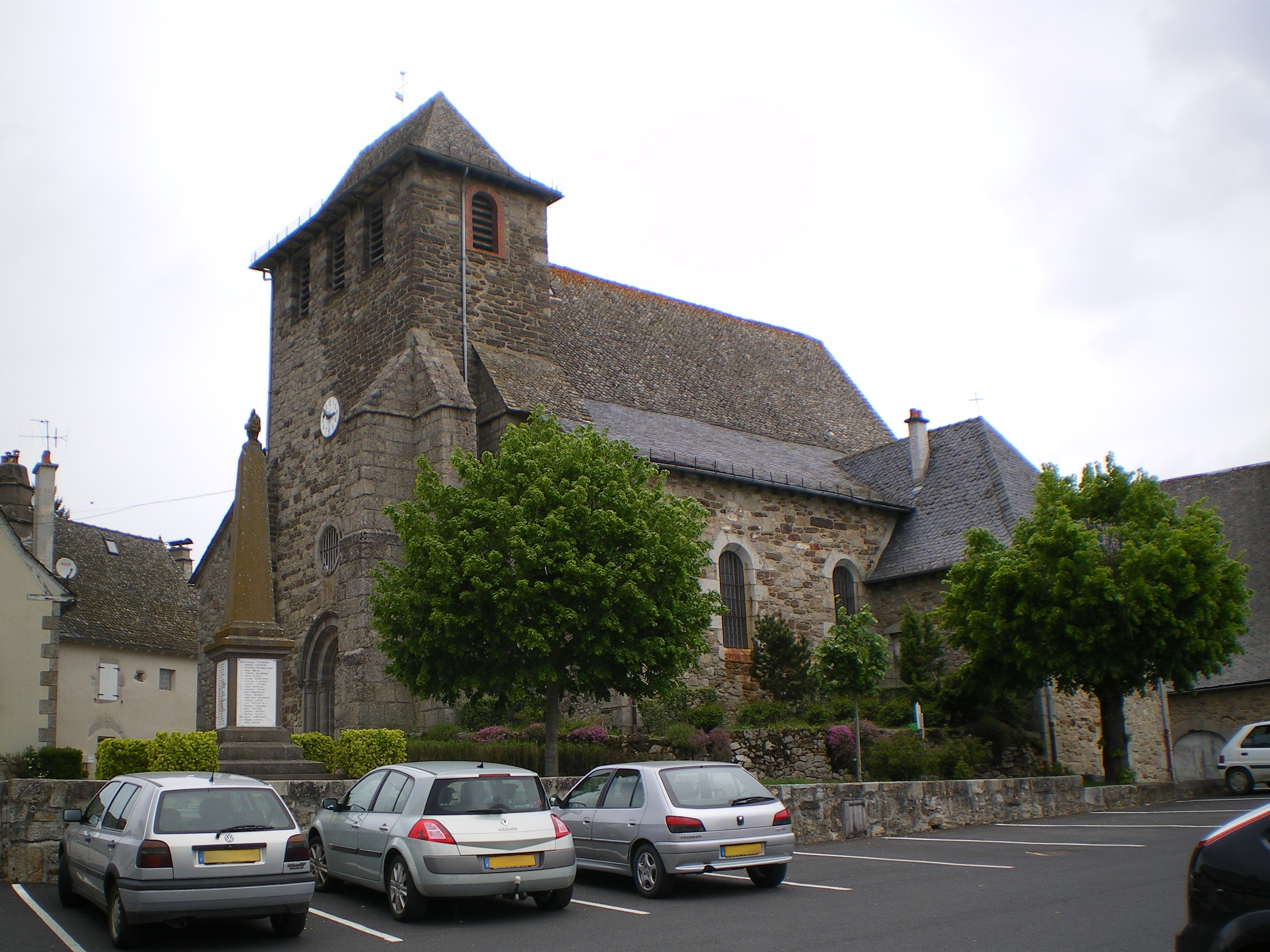
- The church in Saint-Mamet-la-Salvetat

- Coat of arms
- Location of Saint-Mamet-la-Salvetat
- Location within France Location within Auvergne-Rhône-Alpes
- Coordinates: 44°51′32″N 2°18′28″E
- Country: France
- Region: Auvergne-Rhône-Alpes
- Department: Cantal
- Arrondissement: Aurillac
- Canton: Maurs

Government
  - Mayor (2020–2026): Eric Fevrier
- Area^{1}: 51.49 km^{2} (19.88 sq mi)
- Elevation: 742 m (2,434 ft)
- Highest elevation: 790 m (2,590 ft)
- Lowest elevation: 499 m (1,637 ft)
- Population (2023): 1,527
  - Density: 29.66/km^{2} (76.81/sq mi)
- Time zone: UTC+01:00 (CET)
  - Summer (DST): UTC+02:00 (CEST)
- INSEE/Postal code: 15196 /15220
- ^{1} French Land Register data, which excludes lakes, ponds, glaciers > 1 km^{2} (0.386 sq mi or 247 acres) and river estuaries.

Saint-Mamet-la-Salvetat (French pronunciation: [sɛ̃ mamɛ la salvəta]; Languedocien: Sant Mamet e La Salvetat) is a commune in the Cantal department in south-central France.

== Population ==
Historical population
| Year | Pop. | ±% p.a. |
|---|---|---|
| 1968 | 1,153 | — |
| 1975 | 1,200 | +0.57% |
| 1982 | 1,236 | +0.42% |
| 1990 | 1,327 | +0.89% |
| 1999 | 1,321 | −0.05% |
| 2007 | 1,411 | +0.83% |
| 2012 | 1,574 | +2.21% |
| 2017 | 1,550 | −0.31% |
| 2023 | 1,527 | −0.25% |
Source: INSEE

== See also ==
- Communes of the Cantal department
