= Quézac, Cantal =

Commune in Auvergne-Rhône-Alpes, France

Quézac
- Commune
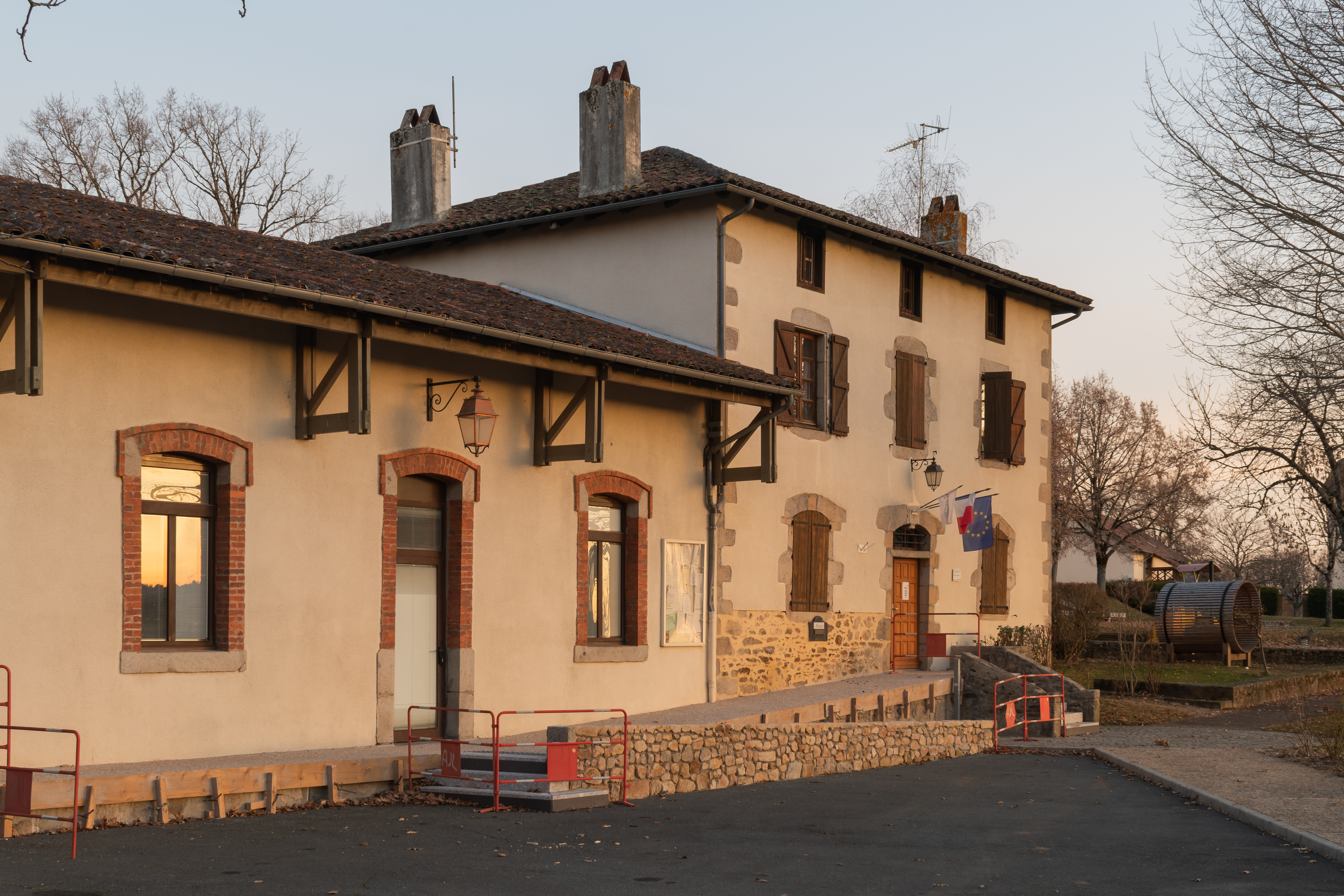
- Town hall of Quézac
- Location of Quézac
- Location within France Location within Auvergne-Rhône-Alpes
- Coordinates: 44°44′55″N 2°11′12″E
- Country: France
- Region: Auvergne-Rhône-Alpes
- Department: Cantal
- Arrondissement: Aurillac
- Canton: Maurs

Government
  - Mayor (2020–2026): Antoine Gimenez
- Area^{1}: 16.43 km^{2} (6.34 sq mi)
- Elevation: 478 m (1,568 ft)
- Highest elevation: 594 m (1,949 ft)
- Lowest elevation: 287 m (942 ft)
- Population (2023): 344
  - Density: 20.9/km^{2} (54.2/sq mi)
- Time zone: UTC+01:00 (CET)
  - Summer (DST): UTC+02:00 (CEST)
- INSEE/Postal code: 15157 /15600
- ^{1} French Land Register data, which excludes lakes, ponds, glaciers > 1 km^{2} (0.386 sq mi or 247 acres) and river estuaries.

Quézac (French pronunciation: [kezak]; Occitan: Quesac) is a French commune in the department of Cantal, located in the south-eastern region of Auvergne-Rhône-Alpes

== Population ==
Historical population
Year	Pop.	±% p.a.
1968	411	—
1975	430	+0.65%
1982	384	−1.60%
1990	350	−1.15%
1999	323	−0.89%
2007	333	+0.38%
2012	312	−1.29%
2017	339	+1.67%
2023	344	+0.24%
Source: INSEE

== History ==
During the 10th century, it was the seat of a Benedictine abbey.

== See also ==
- Communes of the Cantal department
