= Puycapel =

Commune in Auvergne-Rhône-Alpes, France

- Commune
- Location of Puycapel
- Location within France Location within Auvergne-Rhône-Alpes
- Coordinates: 44°43′07″N 2°21′30″E
- Country: France
- Region: Auvergne-Rhône-Alpes
- Department: Cantal
- Arrondissement: Aurillac
- Canton: Maurs
- Intercommunality: Châtaigneraie Cantalienne

Government
  - Mayor (2020–2026): François Danemans
- Area^{1}: 43.72 km^{2} (16.88 sq mi)
- Highest elevation: 742 m (2,434 ft)
- Lowest elevation: 294 m (965 ft)
- Population (2023): 717
  - Density: 16.4/km^{2} (42.5/sq mi)
- Time zone: UTC+01:00 (CET)
  - Summer (DST): UTC+02:00 (CEST)
- INSEE/Postal code: 15027 /15340
- ^{1} French Land Register data, which excludes lakes, ponds, glaciers > 1 km^{2} (0.386 sq mi or 247 acres) and river estuaries.

Puycapel (French pronunciation: [pɥikapɛl]) is a commune in the Cantal department in south-central France. It was established on 1 January 2019 by merger of the former communes of Calvinet and Mourjou.

== See also ==
- Communes of the Cantal department
