= Canton of Maurs =

Coordinates: 44.71°N 2.20°E

- Canton
- Situation of the canton of Maurs in the department of Cantal
- Country: France
- Region: Auvergne-Rhône-Alpes
- Department: Cantal
- No. of communes: {{{nbcomm}}}
- Population (2023): 11,319
- INSEE code: 1506

The canton of Maurs is an administrative division of the Cantal department, southern France. Its borders were modified at the French canton reorganisation which came into effect in March 2015. Its seat is in Maurs.

It consists of the following communes:

1. Boisset
2. Leynhac
3. Marcolès
4. Maurs
5. Montmurat
6. Puycapel
7. Quézac
8. Roannes-Saint-Mary
9. Rouziers
10. Saint-Antoine
11. Saint-Constant-Fournoulès
12. Saint-Étienne-de-Maurs
13. Saint-Julien-de-Toursac
14. Saint-Mamet-la-Salvetat
15. Saint-Santin-de-Maurs
16. Sansac-de-Marmiesse
17. Le Trioulou
18. Vitrac
