= Maurs =

Commune in Auvergne-Rhône-Alpes, France

- Commune
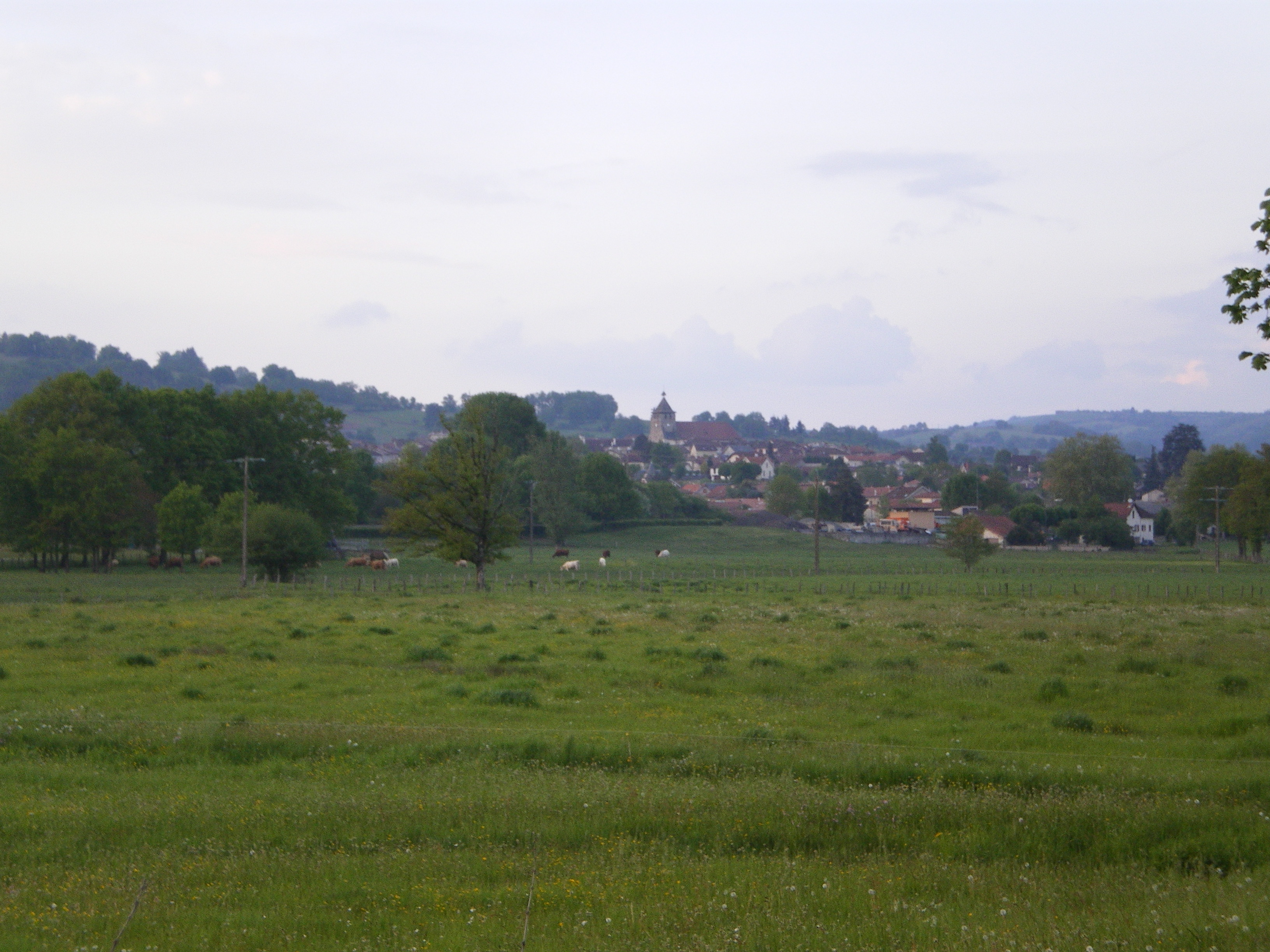
- A general view of Maurs

- Coat of arms
- Location of Maurs
- Location within France Location within Auvergne-Rhône-Alpes
- Coordinates: 44°42′41″N 2°11′56″E
- Country: France
- Region: Auvergne-Rhône-Alpes
- Department: Cantal
- Arrondissement: Aurillac
- Canton: Maurs

Government
  - Mayor (2020–2026): Florian Morelle
- Area^{1}: 30.84 km^{2} (11.91 sq mi)
- Elevation: 290 m (950 ft)
- Highest elevation: 551 m (1,808 ft)
- Lowest elevation: 237 m (778 ft)
- Population (2023): 2,174
  - Density: 70.49/km^{2} (182.6/sq mi)
- Time zone: UTC+01:00 (CET)
  - Summer (DST): UTC+02:00 (CEST)
- INSEE/Postal code: 15122 /15600
- ^{1} French Land Register data, which excludes lakes, ponds, glaciers > 1 km^{2} (0.386 sq mi or 247 acres) and river estuaries.

Maurs (French pronunciation: [mɔʁs]; Occitan: Maurç) is a commune in the south-central French department of Cantal.

== Population ==
Historical population
Year	Pop.	±% p.a.
1968	2,535	—
1975	2,566	+0.17%
1982	2,426	−0.80%
1990	2,350	−0.40%
1999	2,253	−0.47%
2007	2,265	+0.07%
2012	2,160	−0.94%
2017	2,144	−0.15%
2023	2,174	+0.23%
Source: INSEE

== See also ==
- Communes of the Cantal department
