= Andelat =

Commune in Auvergne-Rhône-Alpes, France

- Commune
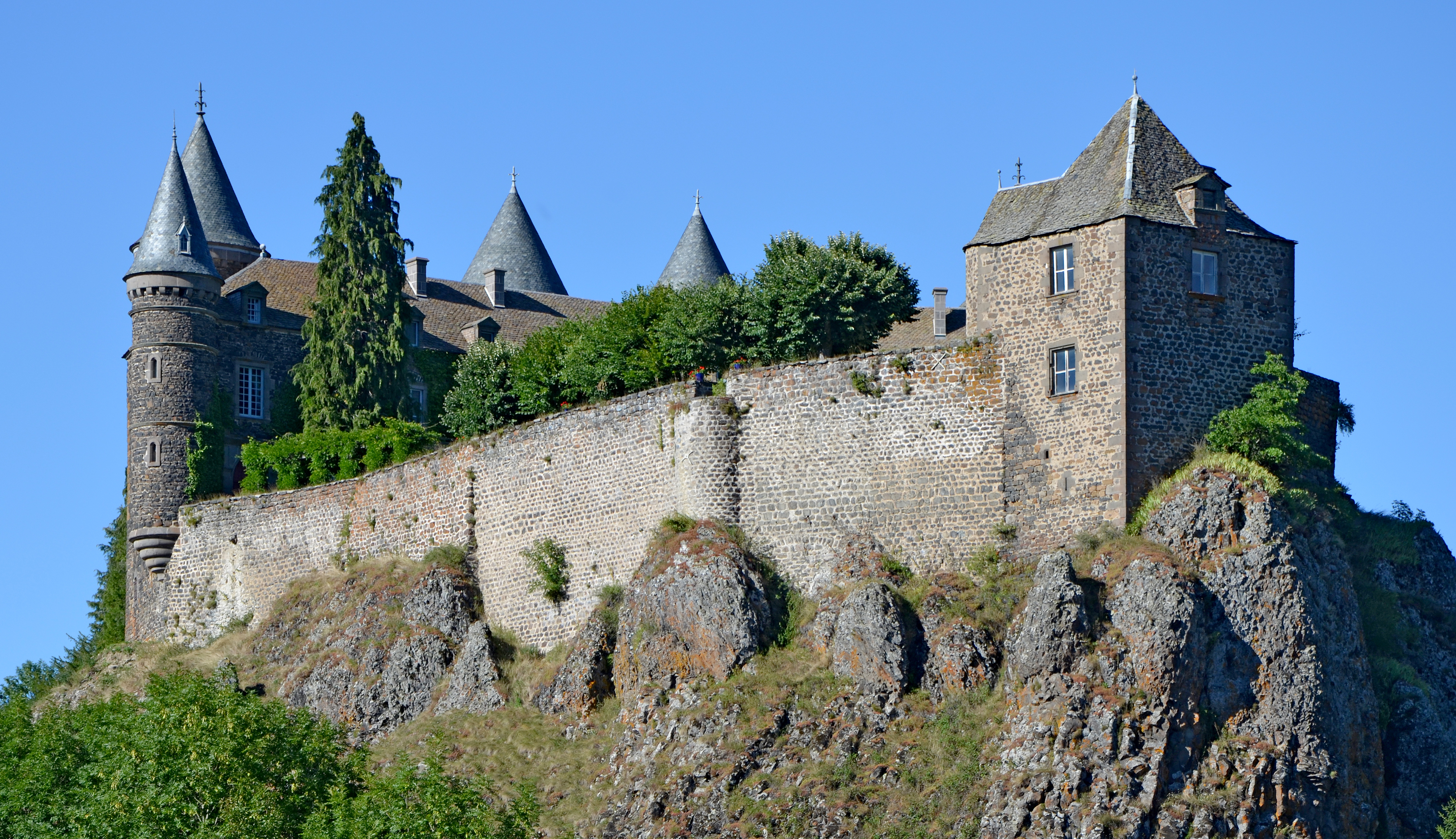
- The Château du Sailhant
- Location of Andelat
- Location within France Location within Auvergne-Rhône-Alpes
- Coordinates: 45°03′41″N 3°03′44″E
- Country: France
- Region: Auvergne-Rhône-Alpes
- Department: Cantal
- Arrondissement: Saint-Flour
- Canton: Saint-Flour-1
- Intercommunality: Saint-Flour Communauté

Government
  - Mayor (2020–2026): Daniel Miral
- Area^{1}: 21.05 km^{2} (8.13 sq mi)
- Elevation: 830 m (2,720 ft)
- Highest elevation: 1,083 m (3,553 ft)
- Lowest elevation: 796 m (2,612 ft)
- Population (2023): 468
  - Density: 22.2/km^{2} (57.6/sq mi)
- Time zone: UTC+01:00 (CET)
  - Summer (DST): UTC+02:00 (CEST)
- INSEE/Postal code: 15004 /15100
- ^{1} French Land Register data, which excludes lakes, ponds, glaciers > 1 km^{2} (0.386 sq mi or 247 acres) and river estuaries.

Andelat (French pronunciation: [ɑ̃dla]; Occitan: Andelac) is a commune in the Cantal department in the Auvergne region of south-central France.

== Geography ==
Andelat is located some 4 km north-west of Saint-Flour. It can be accessed by the D679 road which passes through the east of the commune going north from Saint-Flour to Talizat. The D40 road also goes north-west from Saint-Flour passing just south of the village and continuing north-west through the commune to Coltines. The D404 road also comes south from Talizat to intersect the D40 road in the commune then continues south to Roffiac. Andelat village can only be reached by small country roads from the D40 and the D679. There are a number of other villages and hamlets in the commune. These are: Barret, Pagros, Sebeuge, and Le Sailhant. Apart from a number of small forests (the Bois du Sailhant, Bois de Ferval, Les Bessieres) and some scattered areas of trees the commune is entirely farmland.

A railway line passes through the commune from Saint-Flour in the south east and continuing to the north.

The river Ander flows through the commune from west to east just south of the village and continues south-west to join the Truyère near Anglards-de-Saint-Flour. The Ruisseau de la Souche rises in the north of the commune and flows south-west to join Le Babory which flows from the north of the commune. The Ruisseau de Ferval also joins Le Babory further downstream. Le Babory continues south to join the Ander in the commune.

== History ==
Andelat was chosen by King John to be, since 1360, the seat of the Bailiwick of the Auvergne Mountains. He knew the name of the particular jurisdictions and made it subordinate to the Seneschal of Riom. The magistrates found that the village was unworthy of their offices and made it a traveling seat holding hearings in rented rooms at Chaudes-Aigues and Roffiac, and sometimes at the royal castle at Bredon, now in ruins, in the current commune of Albepierre-Bredons. The seat was transferred by François I in 1491 to Murat without reuniting it with its bailiwick and retained its name of Bailiwick of Andelat.

== Administration ==
List of Successive Mayors

From	To	Name	Party
2001	2008	Marc Bellot	
2008	2026	Daniel Miral	DVG

== Population ==
Historical population
Year	Pop.	±% p.a.
1968	343	—
1975	304	−1.71%
1982	325	+0.96%
1990	350	+0.93%
1999	335	−0.49%
2007	411	+2.59%
2012	449	+1.78%
2017	466	+0.75%
2023	468	+0.07%
Source: INSEE

== Sites and monuments ==
- The waterfall and Sailhant Castle
- The Saint Cirgue Church from the 12th, 13th, and 15th centuries

== See also ==
- Communes of the Cantal department
- Community of Communes of the Planèze website (in French)
