= Bonnac =

Bonnac may refer to the following communes in France:

- Bonnac, Ariège
- Bonnac, Cantal
- Bonnac-la-Côte
