= Lastic =

Lastic may refer to the following places in France:

- Lastic, Cantal, a commune in the Cantal department
- Lastic, Puy-de-Dôme, a commune in the Puy-de-Dôme department
