= Montchamp =

Montchamp is the name of two communes in France:

- Montchamp, Calvados, in the Calvados département
- Montchamp, Cantal, in the Cantal département
