= Auriac-l'Église =

Commune in Auvergne-Rhône-Alpes, France

- Commune
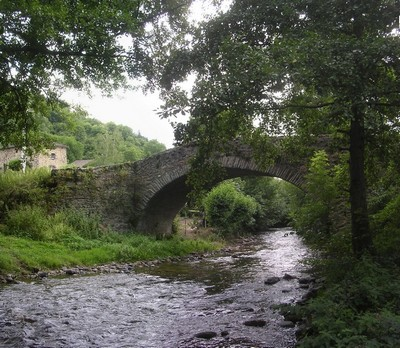
- The Sianne river
- Location of Auriac-l'Église
- Location within France Location within Auvergne-Rhône-Alpes
- Coordinates: 45°15′55″N 3°07′39″E
- Country: France
- Region: Auvergne-Rhône-Alpes
- Department: Cantal
- Arrondissement: Saint-Flour
- Canton: Saint-Flour-1
- Intercommunality: Hautes Terres Communauté

Government
  - Mayor (2020–2026): Vivien Batifoulier
- Area^{1}: 19.73 km^{2} (7.62 sq mi)
- Elevation: 650 m (2,130 ft)
- Highest elevation: 1,010 m (3,310 ft)
- Lowest elevation: 539 m (1,768 ft)
- Population (2023): 141
  - Density: 7.15/km^{2} (18.5/sq mi)
- Time zone: UTC+01:00 (CET)
  - Summer (DST): UTC+02:00 (CEST)
- INSEE/Postal code: 15013 /15500
- ^{1} French Land Register data, which excludes lakes, ponds, glaciers > 1 km^{2} (0.386 sq mi or 247 acres) and river estuaries.

Auriac-l'Église (French pronunciation: [oʁjak leɡliz]; Occitan: Auriac) is a commune in the Cantal department in the Auvergne region of south-central France.

== Gerography ==
Auriac-l'Église is located in the Sianne valley east of the Cézallier mountains some 20 km west of Brioude and 7 km north-west of Massiac. The northern and north-eastern border of the commune is also the border between Cantal and Haute-Loire departments. Access to the commune is by road D9 from Allanche in the south-west which passes through the north of the commune just north of the village and continues north, changing to road D20 at the border. The D21 comes from Massiac in the east changing to the D55 at the border and continuing through the village west to join the D9 west of the commune. The D355 goes south from the village to join the D21 which forms the southern border of the commune. Apart from the village there are the hamlets of Alagnon, Serre, Auriac Bas, and Chaselles. The commune is mixed forest on the slopes and farmland on the plain.

The Sianne river flows through the commune from south-west to north-east before it continues north to join the Alagnon west of Servières. Many tributaries join the Sianne in the commune including the Ruisseau de l'Église, the Ruisseau des Rifs, the Ruisseau de la Bastide, the Ruisseau de Gargaure, the Ruisseau de Fraissinet, The Ruisseau de Balain, and the Ruisseau de Larbounet.

== History ==
In 1855 Friar John Rives of the order of Friars of Saint-Viateur founded a communal school.

In 1899 Friar Camille Mizoule, teacher in Auriac-l'Église and author of La Bretagne à Vol d'oiseau (Brittany Bird Flight) (1898) as well as winner of the Muses armoricaines et Vendéennes award, published a book of poetic essays entitled Auvergne and Brittany.

In 1962 Alphonse Vinatié, (1924-2005), a teacher in the Auriac-l'Église public school and an archaeologist, discovered one of the largest necropolis in France: proto-historic burial mounds in Laurie.

== Administration ==
List of Successive Mayors

From	To	Name
2001	2014	André Glaize
2014	2026	Vivien Batifoulier

== Demography ==
Historical population

Year	Pop.	±% p.a.
1793	894	—
1800	675	−3.93%
1806	995	+6.68%
1821	1,184	+1.17%
1831	1,007	−1.61%
1836	1,060	+1.03%
1841	889	−3.46%
1846	928	+0.86%
1851	900	−0.61%
1856	848	−1.18%
1861	808	−0.96%
1866	777	−0.78%
1872	730	−1.03%
1876	748	+0.61%
1881	722	−0.71%
1886	769	+1.27%
1891	770	+0.03%
1896	724	−1.22%
1901	712	−0.33%

Year	Pop.	±% p.a.
1906	680	−0.92%
1911	642	−1.14%
1921	537	−1.77%
1926	541	+0.15%
1931	541	+0.00%
1936	570	+1.05%
1946	513	−1.05%
1954	503	−0.25%
1962	436	−1.77%
1968	364	−2.96%
1975	293	−3.05%
1982	251	−2.19%
1990	229	−1.14%
1999	209	−1.01%
2007	204	−0.30%
2012	184	−2.04%
2017	153	−3.62%
2023	141	−1.35%

Source: EHESS and INSEE

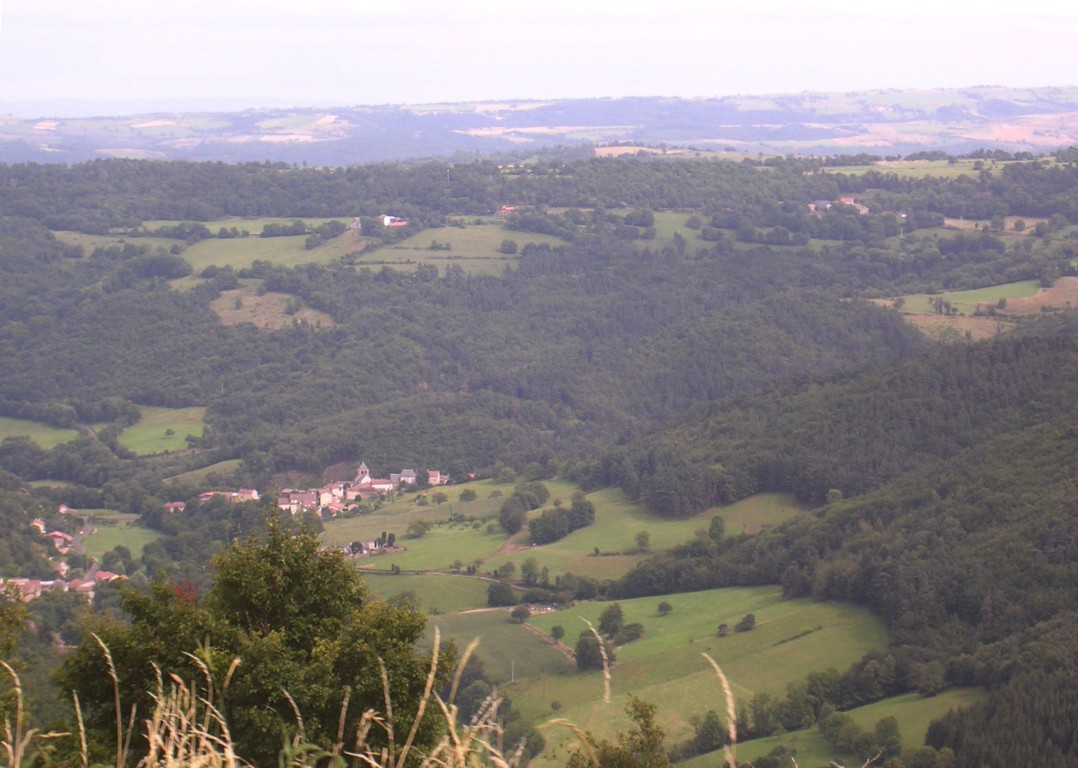
View over the commune

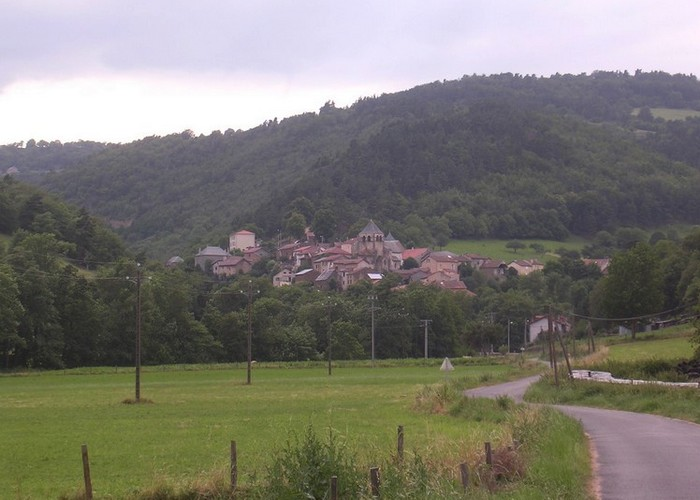
The approach to the village

== Culture and heritage ==
=== Civil heritage ===
- The Motte-and-bailey castle of Chavagnac
- The Dry stone terraces dating from the 19th century, they are located along the edge of the commune and are the remains of the former wine culture. They are called in the local language Pailhas.
- The Château de la Gironde, the remains from the 14th and 18th centuries.
- The Fortified Chateau of Pouzac, a ruined fortified chateau.
- The Old antimony mine, galleries at Riol hamlet.
- Old Houses
- Old ovens, one in the hamlet of Chazelles (demolished in 2002); one in the hamlet of Serre.
- Old Dovecote.
- Mills at Riol and Croze. In 1816 Father Jean-Baptiste Vigouroux (1816-1898) was born in the Riol Mill. He founded the first Catholic mission in New Caledonia in 1851 and, on 24 August 1853, signed the act of possession by France of New Caledonia.
- Gallo-Roman-style Bridge on the Sianne, built in 1897 at Vernède to access 7 properties.
- Sianne Camping ground, the municipal campground with 30 spots located next to the river: 0.76 hectares, 1 star.

=== Religious heritage ===
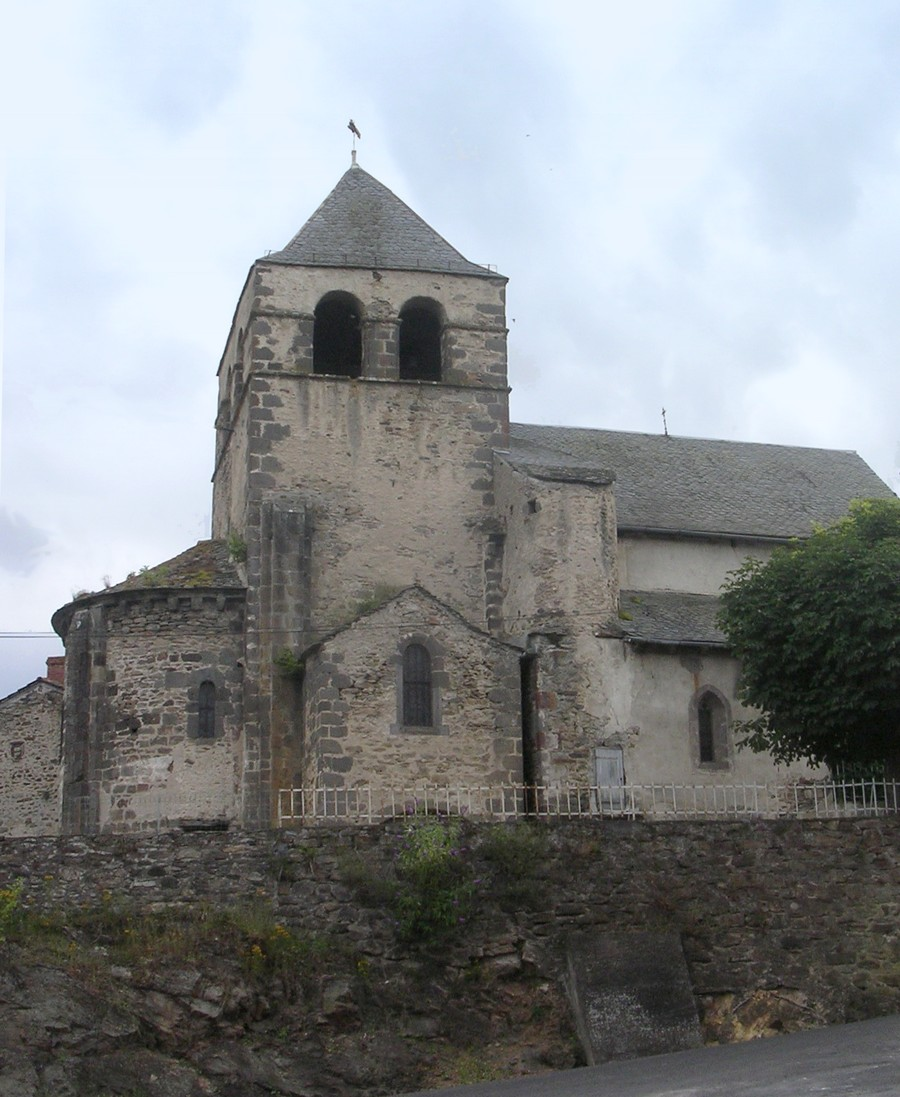
Church of Saint-Nicolas

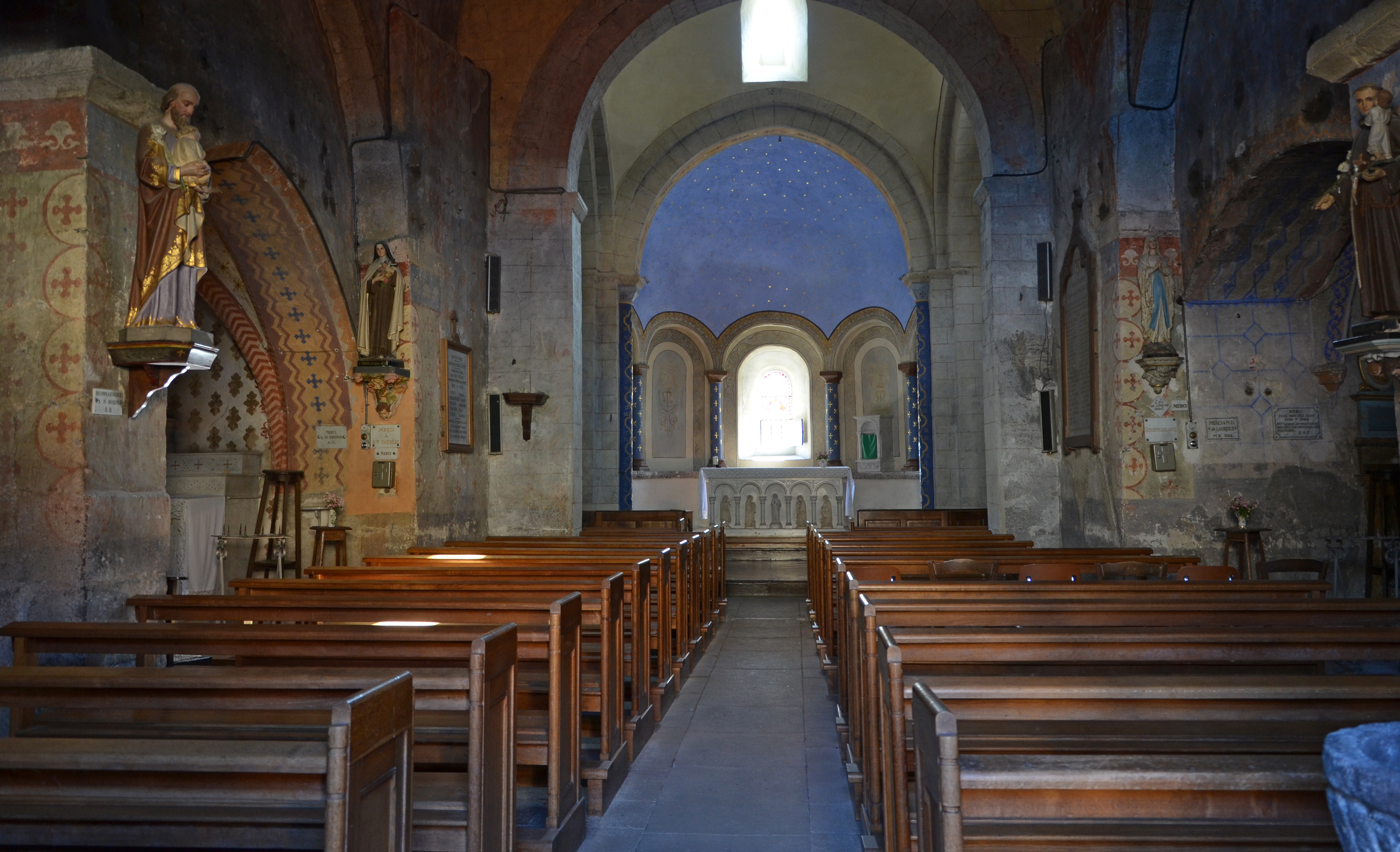
The Nave of the church

- The Church of Saint Nicolas (12th century) is registered as an historical monument.
- A Cross in the Church Square, placed there in 1899.

== Village life ==
- The Activity and Cultural Committee of Auriac-l’Église (CAC)

== Notable people linked to the commune ==
- Jean-Baptiste Vigouroux (1816-1898), ordained a priest in 1842, he joined the order of Marist missionaries in 1848. He founded the first Catholic mission in New Caledonia in 1851 and signed the act of possession for France of New Caledonia on 24 August 1853. Author of plans for the new small seminary of Saint-Flour. He died at Saint-Louis (New Caledonia) in 1898.
- Alphonse Vinatié (1924-2005). He was a teacher and amateur archaeologist. He conducted numerous excavations in northern Cantal and discovered several archaeological sites. A street in Auriac bears his name. He was a teacher in Auriac-l'Église from 1950 to 1963.

== See also ==
- Communes of the Cantal department

=== Bibliography ===
- Our Auvergne ancestors, Auvergne immigration to Brittany, Serge Duigou, Éditions Ressac, Quimper, 2004. (in French) [on the subject of the migratory movement from the Cézallier region towards Brittany in the 18th and 19th centuries - notably Auriac with Andraud, Bourse, Boyé, etc.]
