= Saint-Poncy =

Commune in Auvergne-Rhône-Alpes, France

- Commune
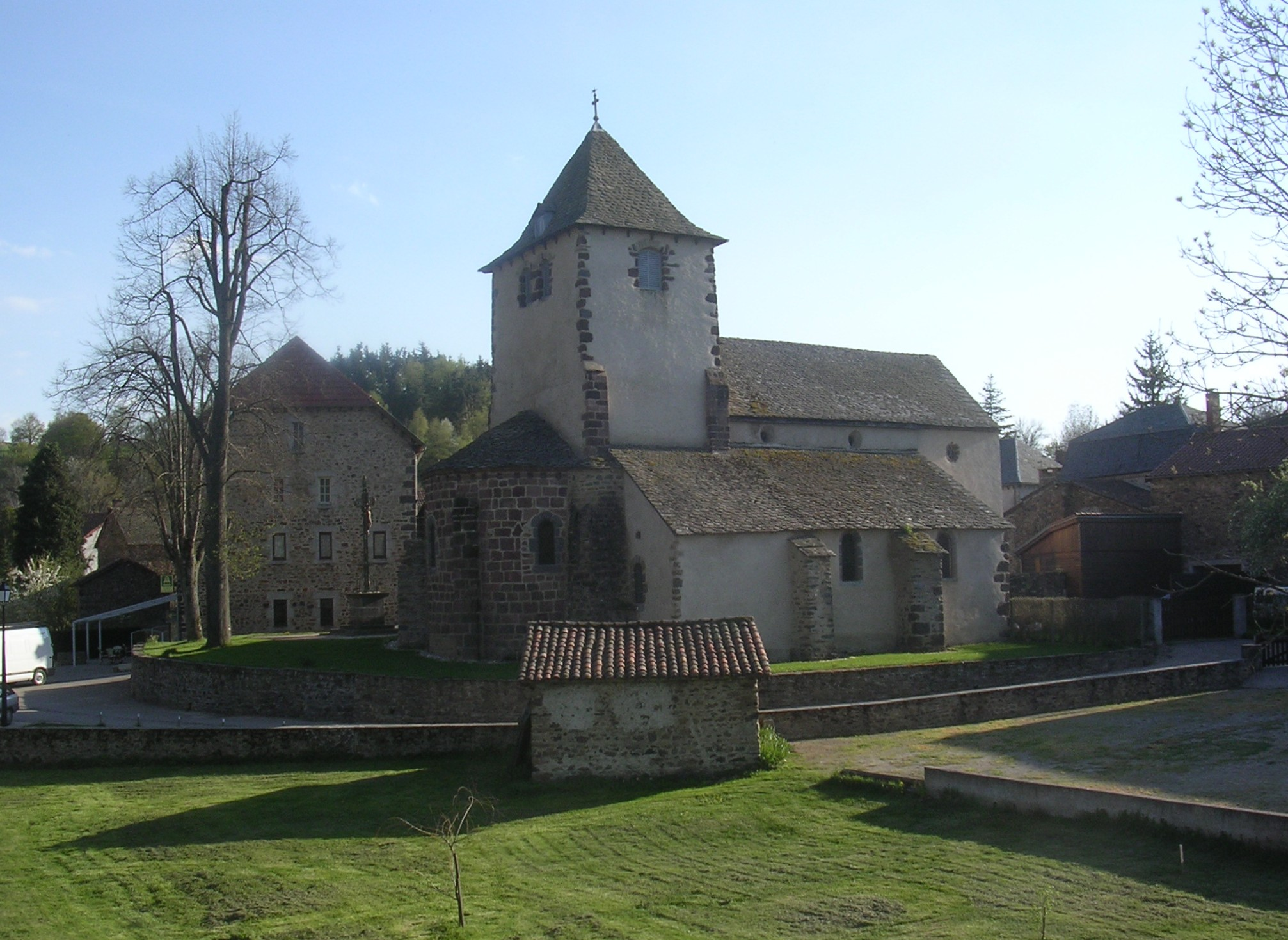
- The church in Saint-Poncy
- Location of Saint-Poncy
- Location within France Location within Auvergne-Rhône-Alpes
- Coordinates: 45°09′56″N 3°11′15″E
- Country: France
- Region: Auvergne-Rhône-Alpes
- Department: Cantal
- Arrondissement: Saint-Flour
- Canton: Saint-Flour-1

Government
  - Mayor (2020–2026): Roland Vernet
- Area^{1}: 40.37 km^{2} (15.59 sq mi)
- Elevation: 826 m (2,710 ft)
- Highest elevation: 1,065 m (3,494 ft)
- Lowest elevation: 599 m (1,965 ft)
- Population (2023): 339
  - Density: 8.40/km^{2} (21.7/sq mi)
- Time zone: UTC+01:00 (CET)
  - Summer (DST): UTC+02:00 (CEST)
- INSEE/Postal code: 15207 /15500
- ^{1} French Land Register data, which excludes lakes, ponds, glaciers > 1 km^{2} (0.386 sq mi or 247 acres) and river estuaries.

Saint-Poncy (French pronunciation: [sɛ̃ pɔ̃si]; Occitan: Sant Pònci) is a commune in the Cantal department in south-central France.

== Population ==
Historical population
Year	Pop.	±% p.a.
1968	473	—
1975	445	−0.87%
1982	418	−0.89%
1990	376	−1.31%
1999	341	−1.08%
2007	324	−0.64%
2012	334	+0.61%
2017	355	+1.23%
2023	339	−0.77%
Source: INSEE

== See also ==
- Communes of the Cantal department
