= Molompize =

Commune in Auvergne-Rhône-Alpes, France

- Commune
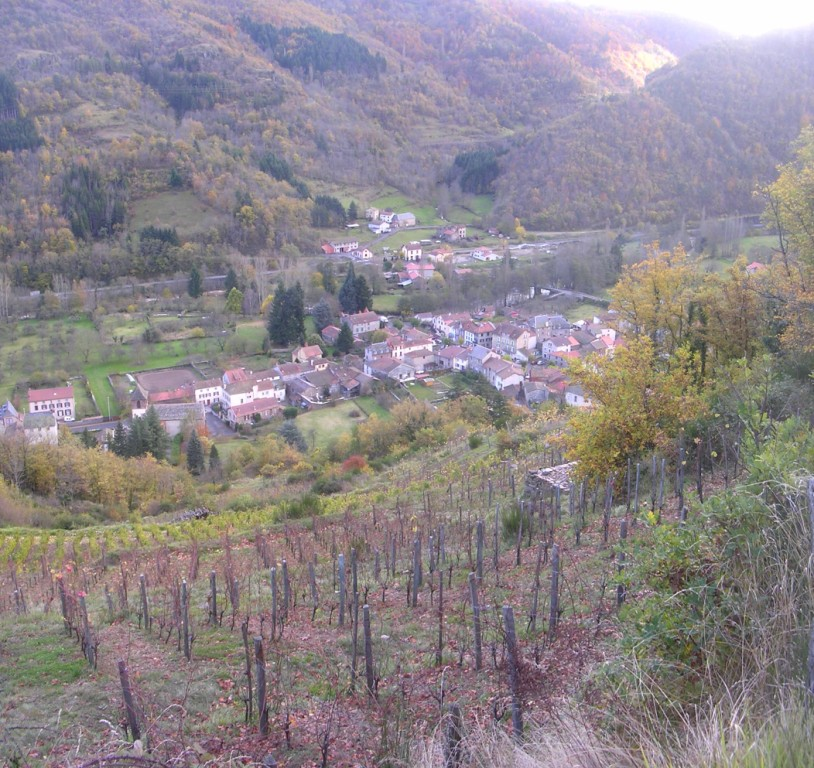
- Molopize and the Alagnon valley

- Coat of arms
- Location of Molompize
- Location within France Location within Auvergne-Rhône-Alpes
- Coordinates: 45°13′51″N 3°07′38″E
- Country: France
- Region: Auvergne-Rhône-Alpes
- Department: Cantal
- Arrondissement: Saint-Flour
- Canton: Saint-Flour-1

Government
  - Mayor (2020–2026): Philippe Leberichel
- Area^{1}: 17.12 km^{2} (6.61 sq mi)
- Elevation: 588 m (1,929 ft)
- Highest elevation: 997 m (3,271 ft)
- Lowest elevation: 549 m (1,801 ft)
- Population (2023): 270
  - Density: 16/km^{2} (41/sq mi)
- Time zone: UTC+01:00 (CET)
  - Summer (DST): UTC+02:00 (CEST)
- INSEE/Postal code: 15127 /15500
- ^{1} French Land Register data, which excludes lakes, ponds, glaciers > 1 km^{2} (0.386 sq mi or 247 acres) and river estuaries.

Molompize (French pronunciation: [mɔlɔ̃piz]; Occitan: Molompise) is a commune in the Cantal department in south-central France.

== Population ==
Historical population
Year	Pop.	±% p.a.
1968	484	—
1975	387	−3.14%
1982	407	+0.72%
1990	341	−2.19%
1999	285	−1.97%
2007	285	+0.00%
2012	310	+1.70%
2017	287	−1.53%
2023	270	−1.01%
Source: INSEE

== See also ==
- Communes of the Cantal department
