= Ferrières-Saint-Mary =

Commune in Auvergne-Rhône-Alpes, France

- Commune
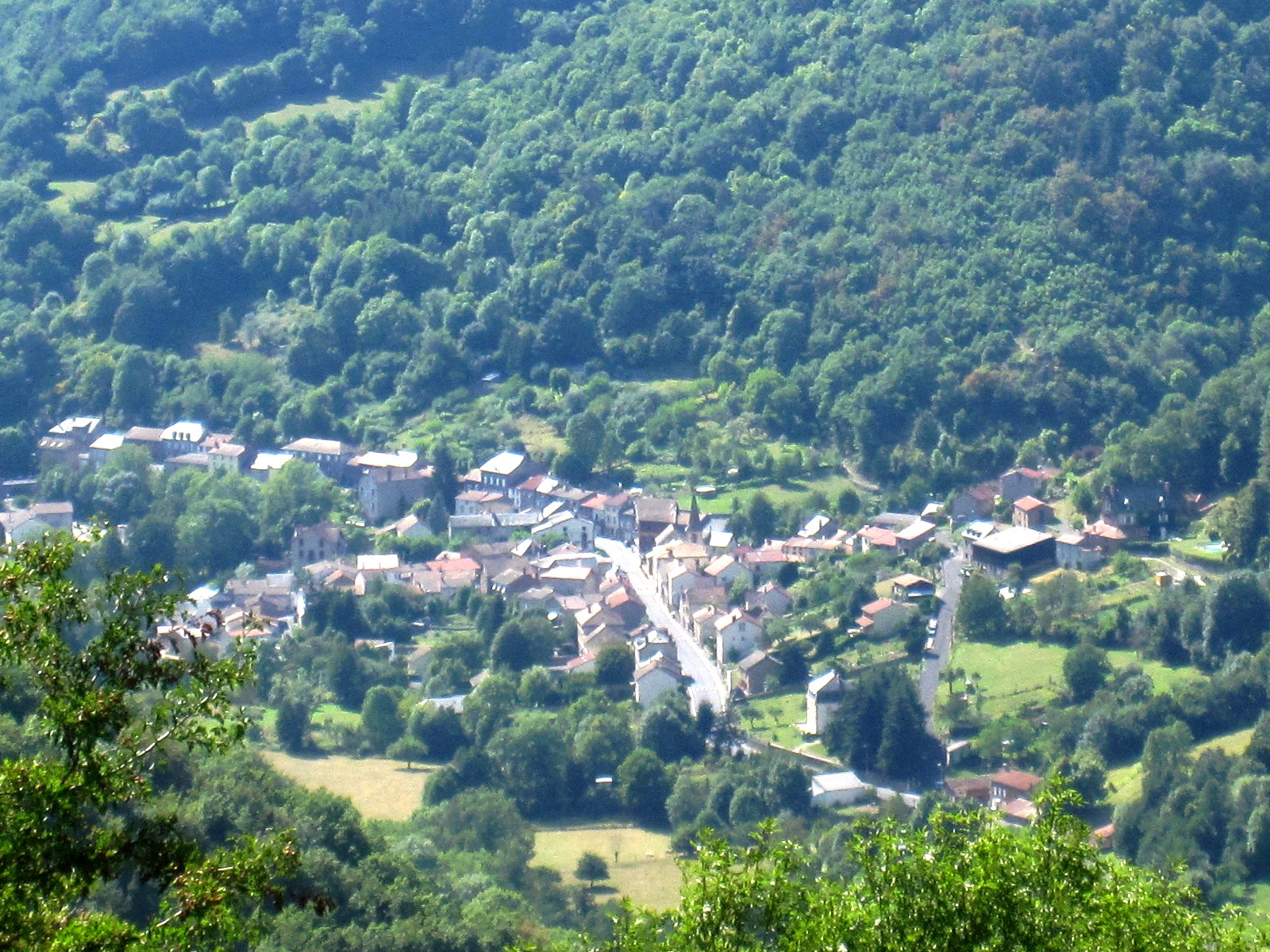
- A general view of Ferrières-Saint-Mary

- Coat of arms
- Location of Ferrières-Saint-Mary
- Location within France Location within Auvergne-Rhône-Alpes
- Coordinates: 45°11′02″N 3°03′32″E
- Country: France
- Region: Auvergne-Rhône-Alpes
- Department: Cantal
- Arrondissement: Saint-Flour
- Canton: Saint-Flour-1

Government
  - Mayor (2020–2026): Franck De Magalhaés
- Area^{1}: 19.17 km^{2} (7.40 sq mi)
- Elevation: 663 m (2,175 ft)
- Highest elevation: 1,178 m (3,865 ft)
- Lowest elevation: 633 m (2,077 ft)
- Population (2023): 235
  - Density: 12.3/km^{2} (31.7/sq mi)
- Time zone: UTC+01:00 (CET)
  - Summer (DST): UTC+02:00 (CEST)
- INSEE/Postal code: 15069 /15170
- ^{1} French Land Register data, which excludes lakes, ponds, glaciers > 1 km^{2} (0.386 sq mi or 247 acres) and river estuaries.

Ferrières-Saint-Mary (French pronunciation: [fɛʁjɛʁ sɛ̃ maʁi]; Occitan: Farreiras e Sant Mari) is a commune in the Cantal department in south-central France.

== Buildings ==
- Saint-Mary de Saint-Mary-le-Cros Church

== Population ==
Historical population
Year	Pop.	±% p.a.
1968	519	—
1975	476	−1.23%
1982	436	−1.25%
1990	402	−1.01%
1999	299	−3.24%
2007	250	−2.21%
2012	253	+0.24%
2017	245	−0.64%
2023	235	−0.69%
Source: INSEE

== See also ==
- Communes of the Cantal department
