= Vieillespesse =

Commune in Auvergne-Rhône-Alpes, France

- Commune
- Location of Vieillespesse
- Location within France Location within Auvergne-Rhône-Alpes
- Coordinates: 45°07′40″N 3°09′10″E
- Country: France
- Region: Auvergne-Rhône-Alpes
- Department: Cantal
- Arrondissement: Saint-Flour
- Canton: Saint-Flour-1
- Intercommunality: Saint-Flour

Government
  - Mayor (2020–2026): Agnès Amarger
- Area^{1}: 24.91 km^{2} (9.62 sq mi)
- Elevation: 962 m (3,156 ft)
- Highest elevation: 1,131 m (3,711 ft)
- Lowest elevation: 880 m (2,890 ft)
- Population (2023): 271
  - Density: 10.9/km^{2} (28.2/sq mi)
- Time zone: UTC+01:00 (CET)
  - Summer (DST): UTC+02:00 (CEST)
- INSEE/Postal code: 15259 /15500
- ^{1} French Land Register data, which excludes lakes, ponds, glaciers > 1 km^{2} (0.386 sq mi or 247 acres) and river estuaries.

Vieillespesse is a commune in the Cantal department in south-central France.

== Population ==
Historical population
| Year | Pop. | ±% p.a. |
|---|---|---|
| 1968 | 347 | — |
| 1975 | 317 | −1.28% |
| 1982 | 302 | −0.69% |
| 1990 | 254 | −2.14% |
| 1999 | 248 | −0.27% |
| 2007 | 253 | +0.25% |
| 2012 | 263 | +0.78% |
| 2017 | 248 | −1.17% |
| 2023 | 271 | +1.49% |
Source: INSEE

== See also ==
- Communes of the Cantal department
