= Saint-Mary de Saint-Mary-le-Cros Church =

Church located in Cantal, in France

Coordinates: 45°11′01″N 3°05′07″E

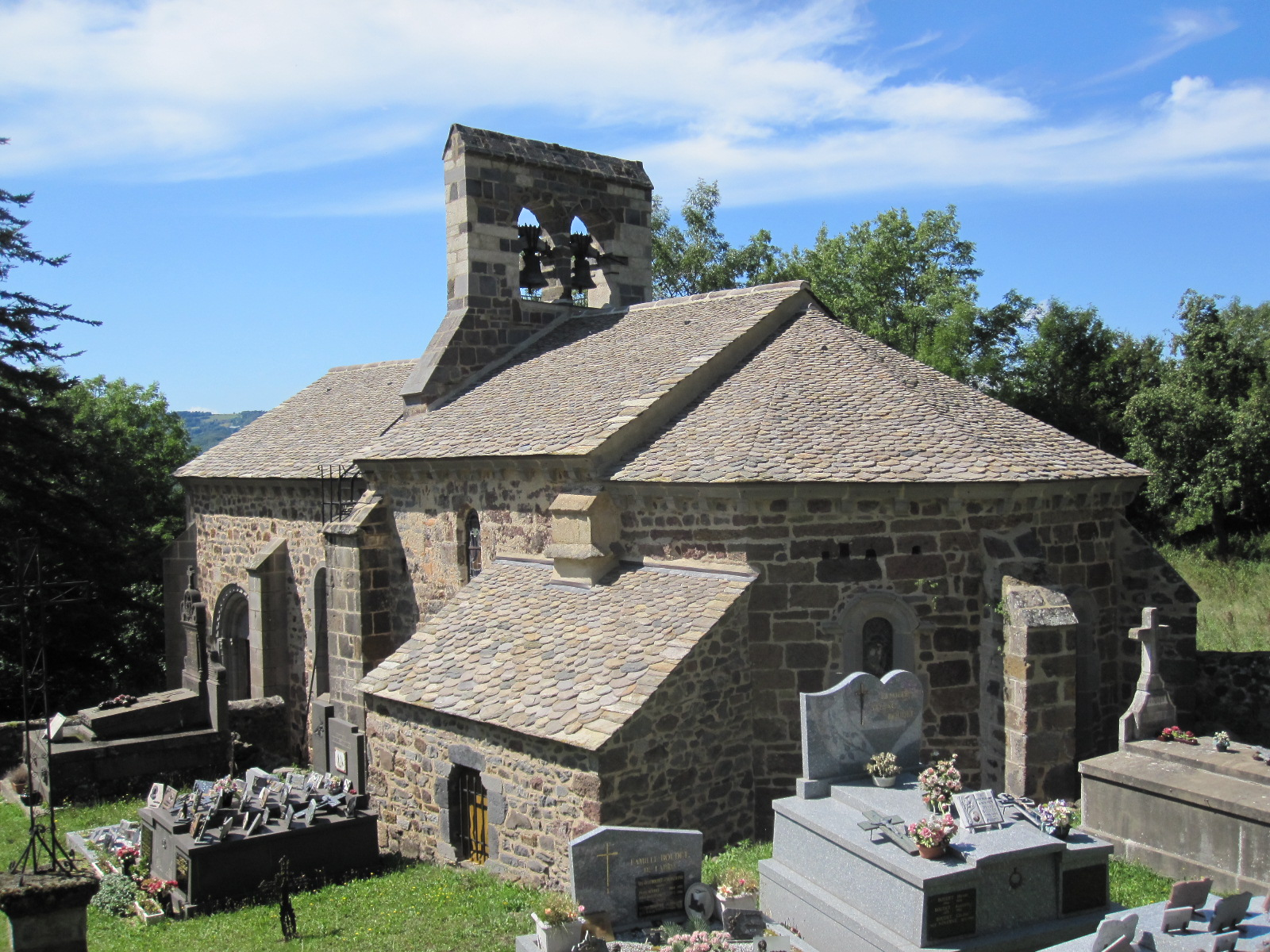
The church.

Saint-Mary de Saint-Mary-le-Cros Church is a French catholic church in the town of Ferrières-Saint-Mary in the Cantal.

== Location ==
The church overlooks the Alagnon river.
