= Leyvaux =

Commune in Auvergne-Rhône-Alpes, France

- Commune
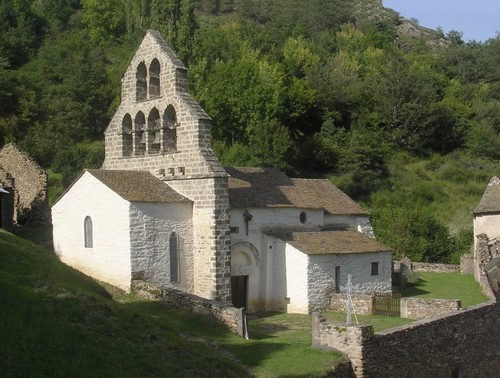
- The church in Leyvaux
- Location of Leyvaux
- Location within France Location within Auvergne-Rhône-Alpes
- Coordinates: 45°18′51″N 3°04′19″E
- Country: France
- Region: Auvergne-Rhône-Alpes
- Department: Cantal
- Arrondissement: Saint-Flour
- Canton: Saint-Flour-1

Government
  - Mayor (2020–2026): Bernard Pagenel
- Area^{1}: 14.95 km^{2} (5.77 sq mi)
- Elevation: 800 m (2,600 ft)
- Highest elevation: 1,106 m (3,629 ft)
- Lowest elevation: 615 m (2,018 ft)
- Population (2023): 37
  - Density: 2.5/km^{2} (6.4/sq mi)
- Time zone: UTC+01:00 (CET)
  - Summer (DST): UTC+02:00 (CEST)
- INSEE/Postal code: 15105 /43450
- ^{1} French Land Register data, which excludes lakes, ponds, glaciers > 1 km^{2} (0.386 sq mi or 247 acres) and river estuaries.

Leyvaux (French pronunciation: [levo]; Occitan: Las Vaus) is a commune in the Cantal department in south-central France.

== Population ==
Historical population
Year	Pop.	±% p.a.
1968	98	—
1975	73	−4.12%
1982	57	−3.47%
1990	50	−1.62%
1999	36	−3.58%
2007	29	−2.67%
2012	35	+3.83%
2017	37	+1.12%
2023	37	+0.00%
Source: INSEE

== See also ==
- Communes of the Cantal department
