= Canton of Saint-Flour-1 =

Coordinates: 45.04°N 3.10°E

- Canton
- Situation of the canton of Saint-Flour-1 in the department of Cantal
- Country: France
- Region: Auvergne-Rhône-Alpes
- Department: Cantal
- No. of communes: {{{nbcomm}}}
- Population (2023): 8,811
- INSEE code: 1511

The canton of Saint-Flour-1 is an administrative division of the Cantal department, southern France. It was created at the French canton reorganisation which came into effect in March 2015. Its seat is in Saint-Flour.

It consists of the following communes:

1. Andelat
2. Auriac-l'Église
3. Bonnac
4. La Chapelle-Laurent
5. Coltines
6. Coren
7. Ferrières-Saint-Mary
8. Lastic
9. Laurie
10. Leyvaux
11. Massiac
12. Mentières
13. Molèdes
14. Molompize
15. Montchamp
16. Rézentières
17. Roffiac
18. Saint-Flour (partly)
19. Saint-Mary-le-Plain
20. Saint-Poncy
21. Talizat
22. Tiviers
23. Valjouze
24. Vieillespesse
