= La Chapelle-Laurent =

Commune in Auvergne-Rhône-Alpes, France

- Commune
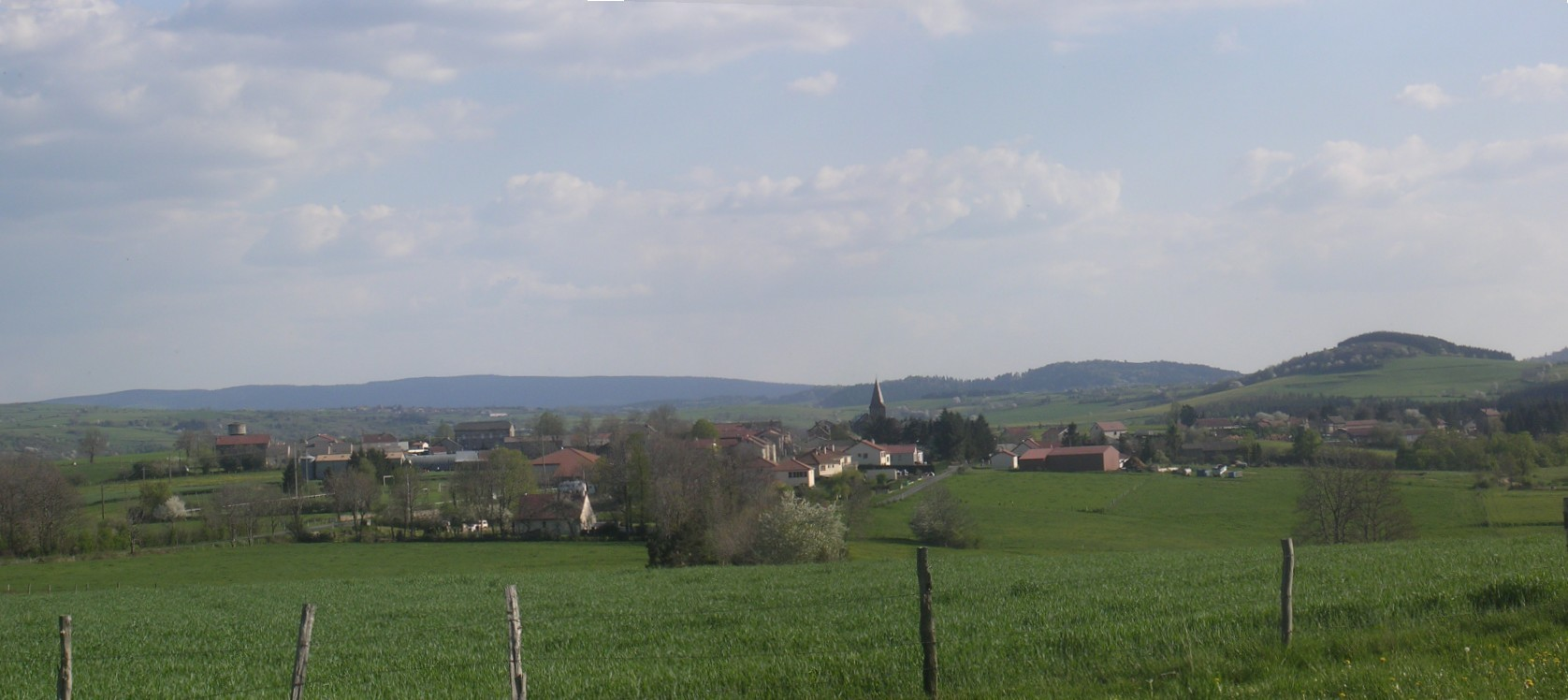
- A general view of La Chapelle-Laurent
- Location of La Chapelle-Laurent
- Location within France Location within Auvergne-Rhône-Alpes
- Coordinates: 45°10′43″N 3°14′40″E
- Country: France
- Region: Auvergne-Rhône-Alpes
- Department: Cantal
- Arrondissement: Saint-Flour
- Canton: Saint-Flour-1

Government
  - Mayor (2020–2026): Georges Ceytre
- Area^{1}: 26.09 km^{2} (10.07 sq mi)
- Highest elevation: 1,060 m (3,480 ft)
- Lowest elevation: 623 m (2,044 ft)
- Population (2023): 234
  - Density: 8.97/km^{2} (23.2/sq mi)
- Time zone: UTC+01:00 (CET)
  - Summer (DST): UTC+02:00 (CEST)
- INSEE/Postal code: 15042 /15500
- ^{1} French Land Register data, which excludes lakes, ponds, glaciers > 1 km^{2} (0.386 sq mi or 247 acres) and river estuaries.

La Chapelle-Laurent (French pronunciation: [la ʃapɛl loʁɑ̃]; Occitan: La Chapèla Laurenç) is a commune in the Cantal department in south-central France.

== Population ==
Historical population
Year	Pop.	±% p.a.
1968	485	—
1975	453	−0.97%
1982	414	−1.28%
1990	399	−0.46%
1999	382	−0.48%
2007	339	−1.48%
2012	319	−1.21%
2017	261	−3.93%
2023	234	−1.80%
Source: INSEE

== See also ==
- Communes of the Cantal department
