= Montchamp, Cantal =

Commune in Auvergne-Rhône-Alpes, France

Montchamp
- Commune
- Location of Montchamp
- Location within France Location within Auvergne-Rhône-Alpes
- Coordinates: 45°04′17″N 3°12′12″E
- Country: France
- Region: Auvergne-Rhône-Alpes
- Department: Cantal
- Arrondissement: Saint-Flour
- Canton: Saint-Flour-1
- Intercommunality: Saint-Flour Communauté

Government
  - Mayor (2020–2026): Jean-Paul Resche
- Area^{1}: 15.9 km^{2} (6.1 sq mi)
- Elevation: 1,090 m (3,580 ft)
- Highest elevation: 1,174 m (3,852 ft)
- Lowest elevation: 946 m (3,104 ft)
- Population (2023): 137
  - Density: 8.62/km^{2} (22.3/sq mi)
- Time zone: UTC+01:00 (CET)
  - Summer (DST): UTC+02:00 (CEST)
- INSEE/Postal code: 15130 /15100
- ^{1} French Land Register data, which excludes lakes, ponds, glaciers > 1 km^{2} (0.386 sq mi or 247 acres) and river estuaries.

Montchamp (French pronunciation: [mɔ̃ʃɑ̃]; Occitan: Montchalm) is a commune in the Cantal department in south-central France.

== Population ==
Historical population
Year	Pop.	±% p.a.
1968	213	—
1975	168	−3.33%
1982	153	−1.33%
1990	147	−0.50%
1999	124	−1.87%
2007	131	+0.69%
2012	135	+0.60%
2017	136	+0.15%
2023	137	+0.12%
Source: INSEE

== See also ==
- Communes of the Cantal department
