= Bonnac, Cantal =

Commune in Auvergne-Rhône-Alpes, France

Bonnac
- Commune
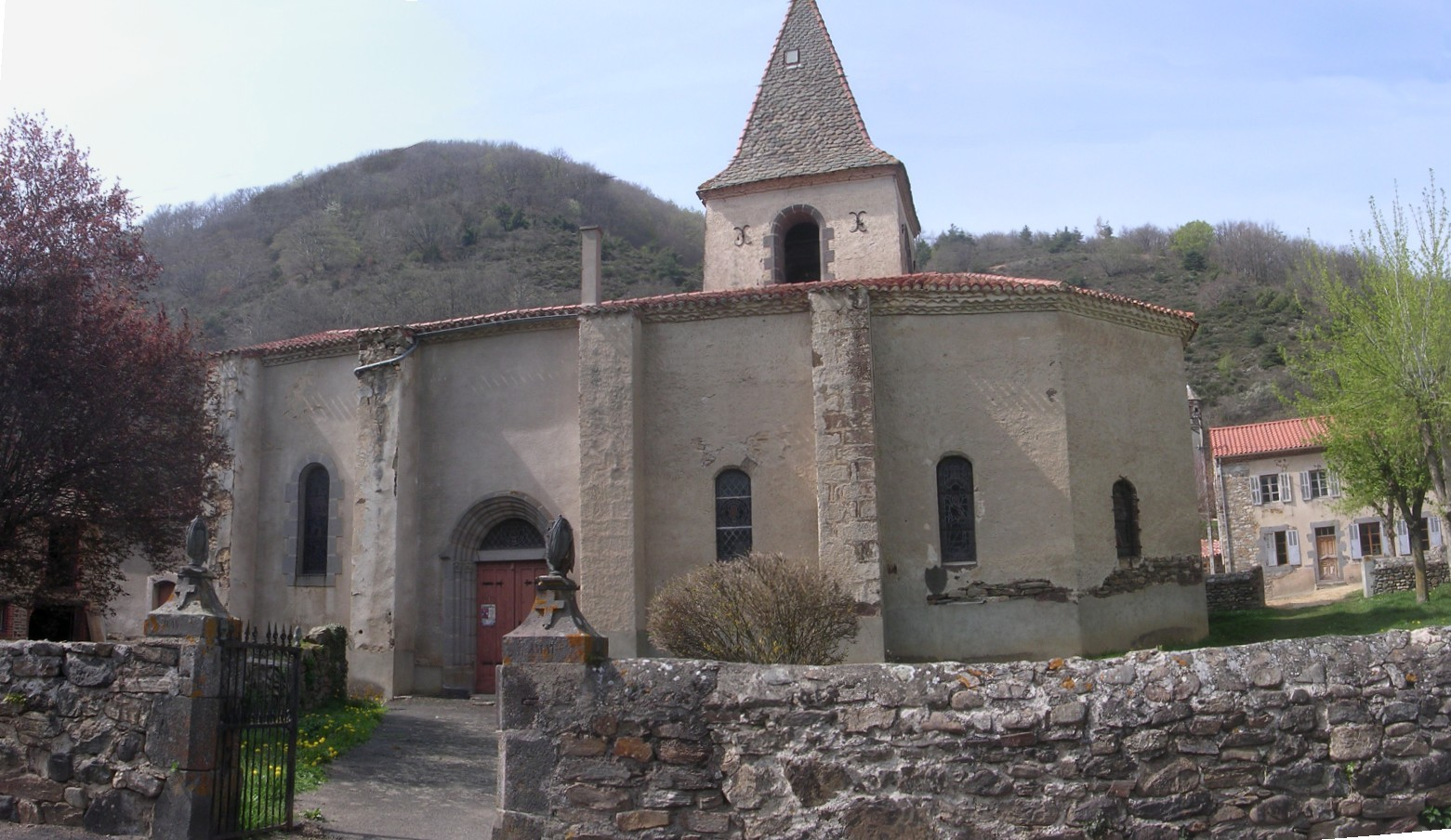
- The church in Bonnac

- Coat of arms
- Location of Bonnac
- Location within France Location within Auvergne-Rhône-Alpes
- Coordinates: 45°12′31″N 3°09′33″E
- Country: France
- Region: Auvergne-Rhône-Alpes
- Department: Cantal
- Arrondissement: Saint-Flour
- Canton: Saint-Flour-1
- Intercommunality: Hautes Terres

Government
  - Mayor (2020–2026): Marie-Claire Tuffery
- Area^{1}: 22.6 km^{2} (8.7 sq mi)
- Elevation: 680 m (2,230 ft)
- Highest elevation: 1,007 m (3,304 ft)
- Lowest elevation: 560 m (1,840 ft)
- Population (2023): 158
  - Density: 6.99/km^{2} (18.1/sq mi)
- Time zone: UTC+01:00 (CET)
  - Summer (DST): UTC+02:00 (CEST)
- INSEE/Postal code: 15022 /15500
- ^{1} French Land Register data, which excludes lakes, ponds, glaciers > 1 km^{2} (0.386 sq mi or 247 acres) and river estuaries.

Bonnac (French pronunciation: [bɔnak]) is a commune in the Cantal department in south-central France.

== Population ==
Historical population
Year	Pop.	±% p.a.
1968	277	—
1975	234	−2.38%
1982	175	−4.07%
1990	170	−0.36%
1999	158	−0.81%
2007	150	−0.65%
2012	170	+2.53%
2017	164	−0.72%
2023	158	−0.62%
Source: INSEE

== See also ==
- Communes of the Cantal department
