= Lastic, Cantal =

Commune in Auvergne-Rhône-Alpes, France

Lastic
- Commune
- Location of Lastic
- Location within France Location within Auvergne-Rhône-Alpes
- Coordinates: 45°06′49″N 3°12′39″E
- Country: France
- Region: Auvergne-Rhône-Alpes
- Department: Cantal
- Arrondissement: Saint-Flour
- Canton: Saint-Flour-1
- Intercommunality: Saint-Flour Communauté

Government
  - Mayor (2020–2026): Serge Talamandier
- Area^{1}: 10.47 km^{2} (4.04 sq mi)
- Elevation: 1,140 m (3,740 ft)
- Highest elevation: 1,143 m (3,750 ft)
- Lowest elevation: 985 m (3,232 ft)
- Population (2023): 109
  - Density: 10.4/km^{2} (27.0/sq mi)
- Time zone: UTC+01:00 (CET)
  - Summer (DST): UTC+02:00 (CEST)
- INSEE/Postal code: 15097 /15500
- ^{1} French Land Register data, which excludes lakes, ponds, glaciers > 1 km^{2} (0.386 sq mi or 247 acres) and river estuaries.

Lastic (French pronunciation: [lastik]; Occitan: Lastic) is a commune in the Cantal department in south-central France.

== Population ==
Historical population
Year	Pop.	±% p.a.
1968	217	—
1975	190	−1.88%
1982	159	−2.51%
1990	135	−2.02%
1999	130	−0.42%
2007	115	−1.52%
2012	111	−0.71%
2017	122	+1.91%
2023	109	−1.86%
Source: INSEE

== See also ==
- Communes of the Cantal department
