= Laurie, Cantal =

Commune in Auvergne-Rhône-Alpes, France

Laurie
- Commune
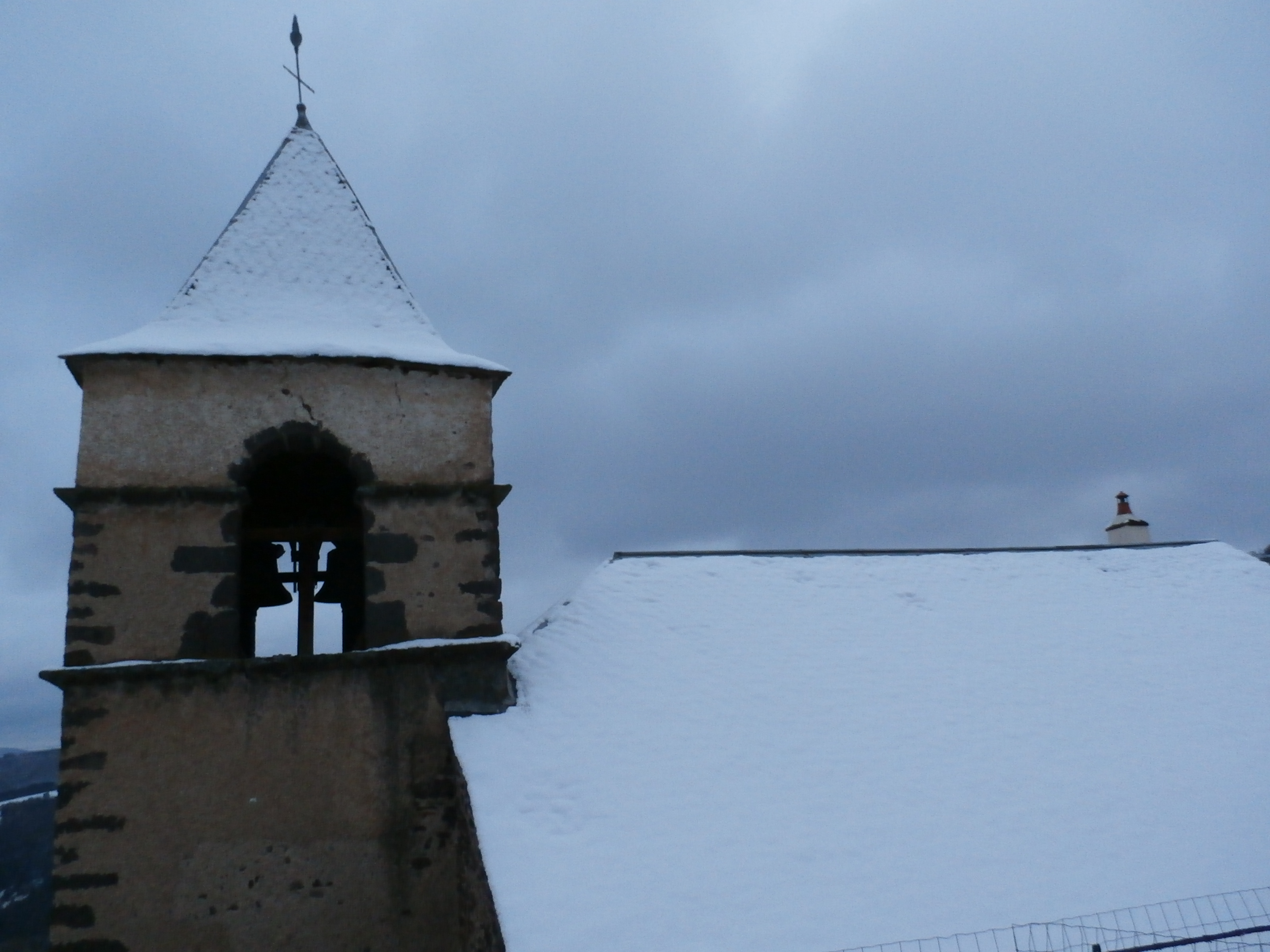
- The church in the snow
- Location of Laurie
- Location within France Location within Auvergne-Rhône-Alpes
- Coordinates: 45°16′39″N 3°06′04″E
- Country: France
- Region: Auvergne-Rhône-Alpes
- Department: Cantal
- Arrondissement: Saint-Flour
- Canton: Saint-Flour-1
- Intercommunality: Hautes Terres

Government
  - Mayor (2020–2026): Robert Jouve
- Area^{1}: 19.23 km^{2} (7.42 sq mi)
- Elevation: 840 m (2,760 ft)
- Highest elevation: 1,200 m (3,900 ft)
- Lowest elevation: 649 m (2,129 ft)
- Population (2023): 84
  - Density: 4.4/km^{2} (11/sq mi)
- Time zone: UTC+01:00 (CET)
  - Summer (DST): UTC+02:00 (CEST)
- INSEE/Postal code: 15098 /15500
- ^{1} French Land Register data, which excludes lakes, ponds, glaciers > 1 km^{2} (0.386 sq mi or 247 acres) and river estuaries.

Laurie (French pronunciation: [loʁi]; Occitan: Làuria) is a commune in the Cantal department in south-central France.

== Population ==
Historical population
Year	Pop.	±% p.a.
1968	200	—
1975	165	−2.71%
1982	160	−0.44%
1990	139	−1.74%
1999	117	−1.90%
2007	91	−3.09%
2012	103	+2.51%
2017	91	−2.45%
2023	84	−1.33%
Source: INSEE

== See also ==
- Communes of the Cantal department
