= Talizat =

Commune in Auvergne-Rhône-Alpes, France

- Commune
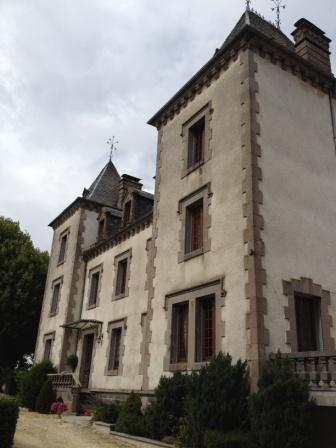
- The Château de Vernières, in Talizat
- Location of Talizat
- Location within France Location within Auvergne-Rhône-Alpes
- Coordinates: 45°06′53″N 3°02′52″E
- Country: France
- Region: Auvergne-Rhône-Alpes
- Department: Cantal
- Arrondissement: Saint-Flour
- Canton: Saint-Flour-1
- Intercommunality: Saint-Flour Communauté

Government
  - Mayor (2020–2026): Jean-Charles Fayon
- Area^{1}: 37.62 km^{2} (14.53 sq mi)
- Elevation: 943 m (3,094 ft)
- Highest elevation: 1,162 m (3,812 ft)
- Lowest elevation: 700 m (2,300 ft)
- Population (2023): 592
  - Density: 15.7/km^{2} (40.8/sq mi)
- Time zone: UTC+01:00 (CET)
  - Summer (DST): UTC+02:00 (CEST)
- INSEE/Postal code: 15231 /15170
- Website: https://talizat.fr
- ^{1} French Land Register data, which excludes lakes, ponds, glaciers > 1 km^{2} (0.386 sq mi or 247 acres) and river estuaries.

Talizat (French pronunciation: [taliza]; Occitan: Talisac) is a commune in the Cantal department in south-central France.

== Population ==
Historical population
Year	Pop.	±% p.a.
1968	731	—
1975	697	−0.68%
1982	635	−1.32%
1990	637	+0.04%
1999	592	−0.81%
2007	556	−0.78%
2012	594	+1.33%
2017	581	−0.44%
2023	592	+0.31%
Source: INSEE

== See also ==
- Communes of the Cantal department
