= Coltines =

Commune in Auvergne-Rhône-Alpes, France

- Commune
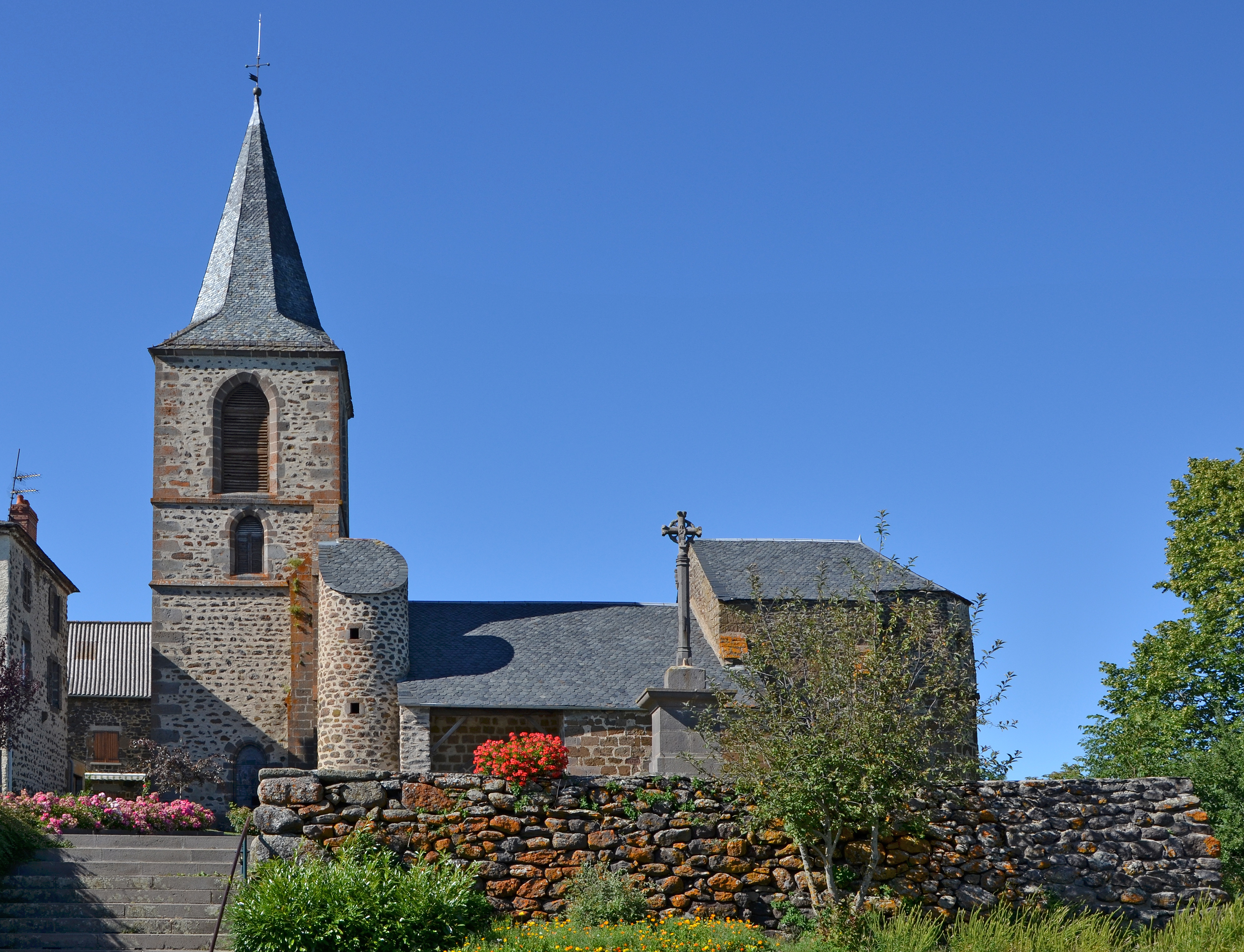
- The church in Coltines
- Location of Coltines
- Location within France Location within Auvergne-Rhône-Alpes
- Coordinates: 45°05′39″N 2°59′19″E
- Country: France
- Region: Auvergne-Rhône-Alpes
- Department: Cantal
- Arrondissement: Saint-Flour
- Canton: Saint-Flour-1
- Intercommunality: Saint-Flour Communauté

Government
  - Mayor (2020–2026): Didier Amarger
- Area^{1}: 19.02 km^{2} (7.34 sq mi)
- Elevation: 943 m (3,094 ft)
- Highest elevation: 1,010 m (3,310 ft)
- Lowest elevation: 913 m (2,995 ft)
- Population (2023): 427
  - Density: 22.5/km^{2} (58.1/sq mi)
- Time zone: UTC+01:00 (CET)
  - Summer (DST): UTC+02:00 (CEST)
- INSEE/Postal code: 15053 /15170
- ^{1} French Land Register data, which excludes lakes, ponds, glaciers > 1 km^{2} (0.386 sq mi or 247 acres) and river estuaries.

Coltines (French pronunciation: [kɔltin]; Occitan: Coltinas) is a commune in the Cantal department in south-central France.

== Population ==
Historical population
Year	Pop.	±% p.a.
1968	312	—
1975	298	−0.65%
1982	314	+0.75%
1990	358	+1.65%
1999	404	+1.35%
2007	422	+0.55%
2012	450	+1.29%
2017	454	+0.18%
2023	427	−1.02%
Source: INSEE

== See also ==
- Communes of the Cantal department
