= Roffiac =

Commune in Auvergne-Rhône-Alpes, France

- Commune
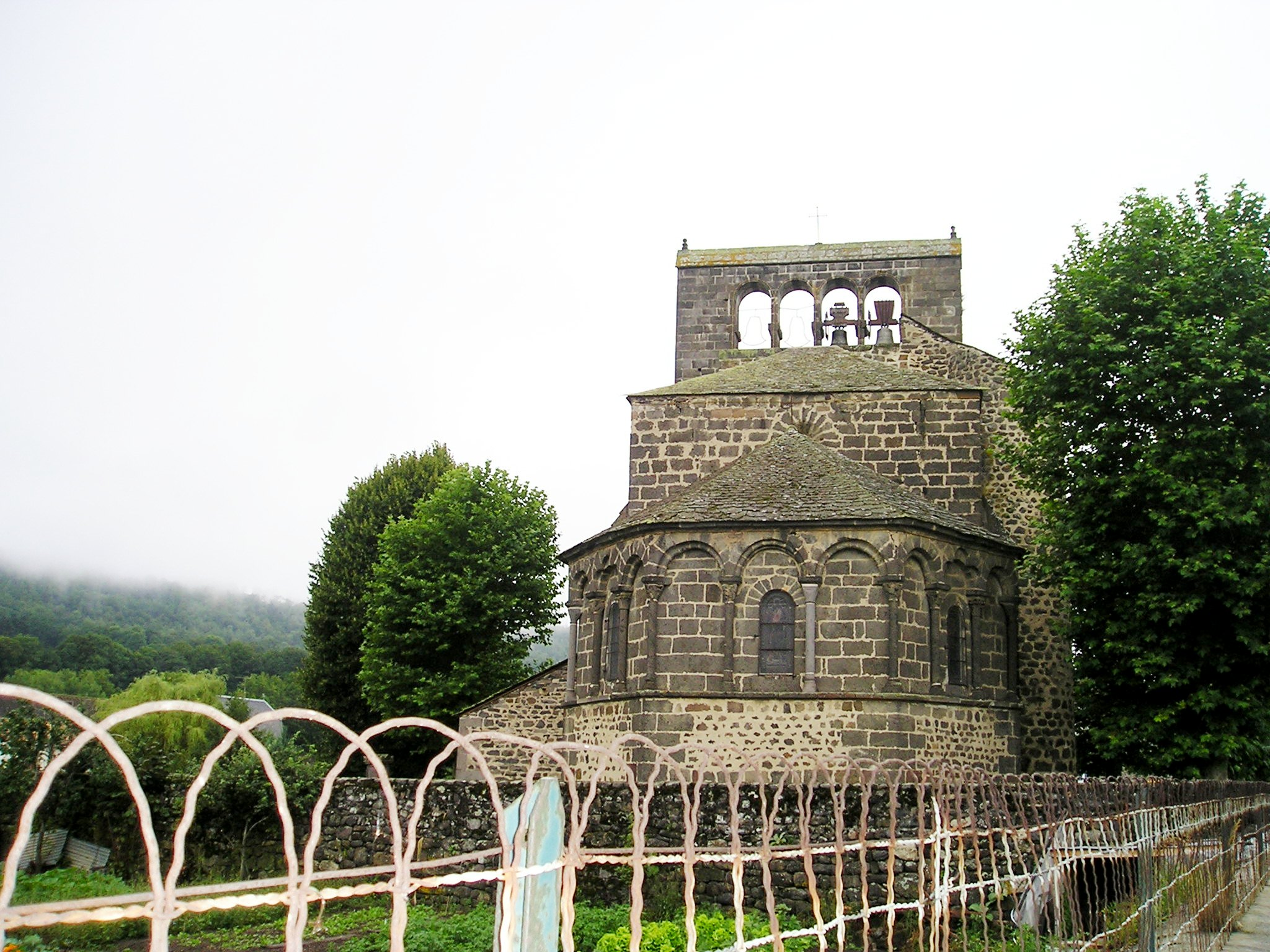
- The Church of Saint-Gal, in Roffiac
- Location of Roffiac
- Location within France Location within Auvergne-Rhône-Alpes
- Coordinates: 45°03′12″N 3°02′19″E
- Country: France
- Region: Auvergne-Rhône-Alpes
- Department: Cantal
- Arrondissement: Saint-Flour
- Canton: Saint-Flour-1
- Intercommunality: Saint-Flour

Government
  - Mayor (2020–2026): Ghislaine Delrieu
- Area^{1}: 21.26 km^{2} (8.21 sq mi)
- Highest elevation: 1,006 m (3,301 ft)
- Lowest elevation: 815 m (2,674 ft)
- Population (2023): 561
  - Density: 26.4/km^{2} (68.3/sq mi)
- Time zone: UTC+01:00 (CET)
  - Summer (DST): UTC+02:00 (CEST)
- INSEE/Postal code: 15164 /15100
- ^{1} French Land Register data, which excludes lakes, ponds, glaciers > 1 km^{2} (0.386 sq mi or 247 acres) and river estuaries.

Roffiac (French pronunciation: [ʁɔfjak]; Occitan: Rofiac) is a commune in the Cantal department in south-central France.

== Population ==
Historical population
Year	Pop.	±% p.a.
1968	421	—
1975	406	−0.52%
1982	459	+1.77%
1990	558	+2.47%
1999	563	+0.10%
2007	577	+0.31%
2012	597	+0.68%
2017	615	+0.60%
2023	561	−1.52%
Source: INSEE

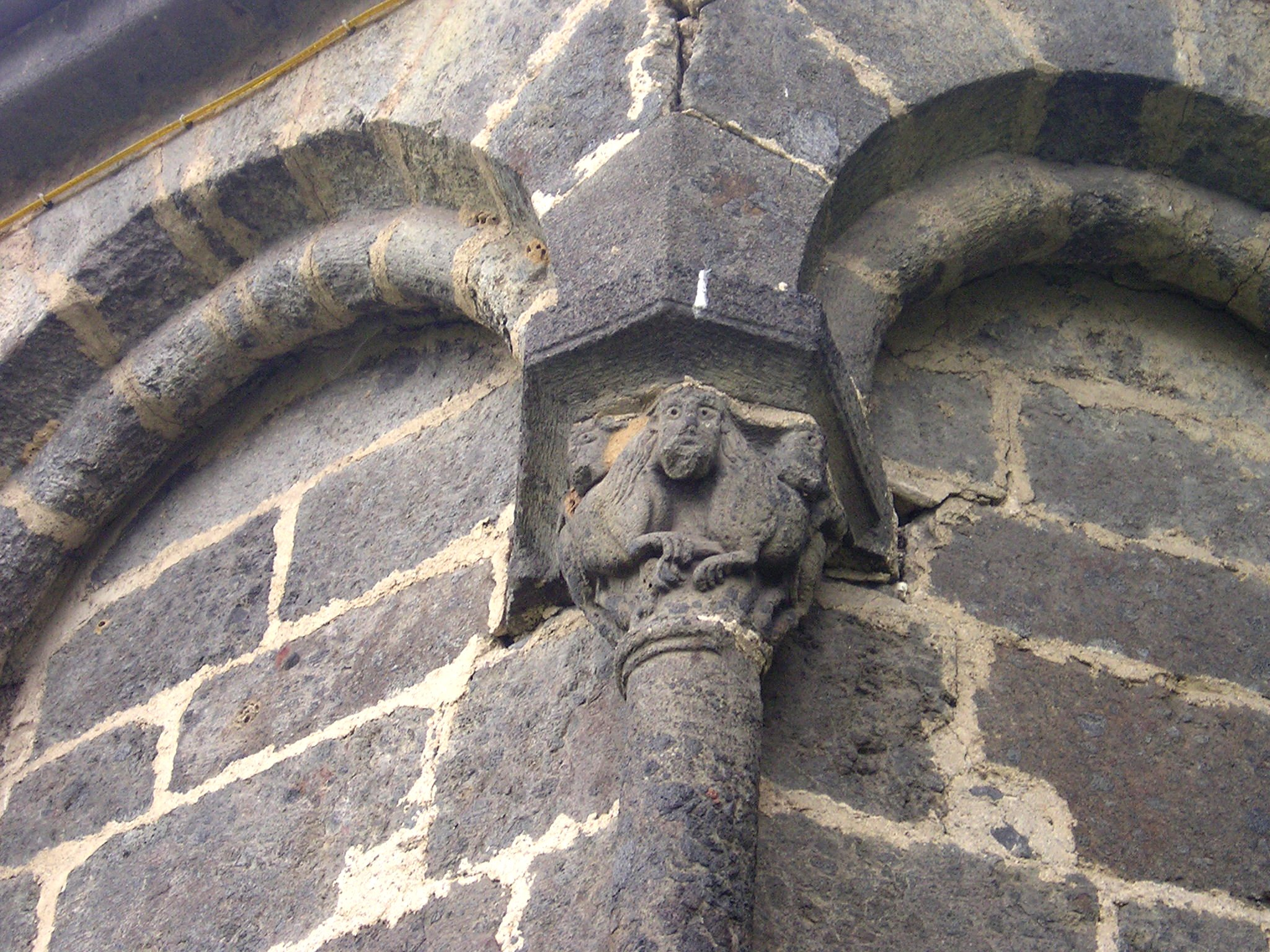
Detail from the church

== See also ==
- Communes of the Cantal department

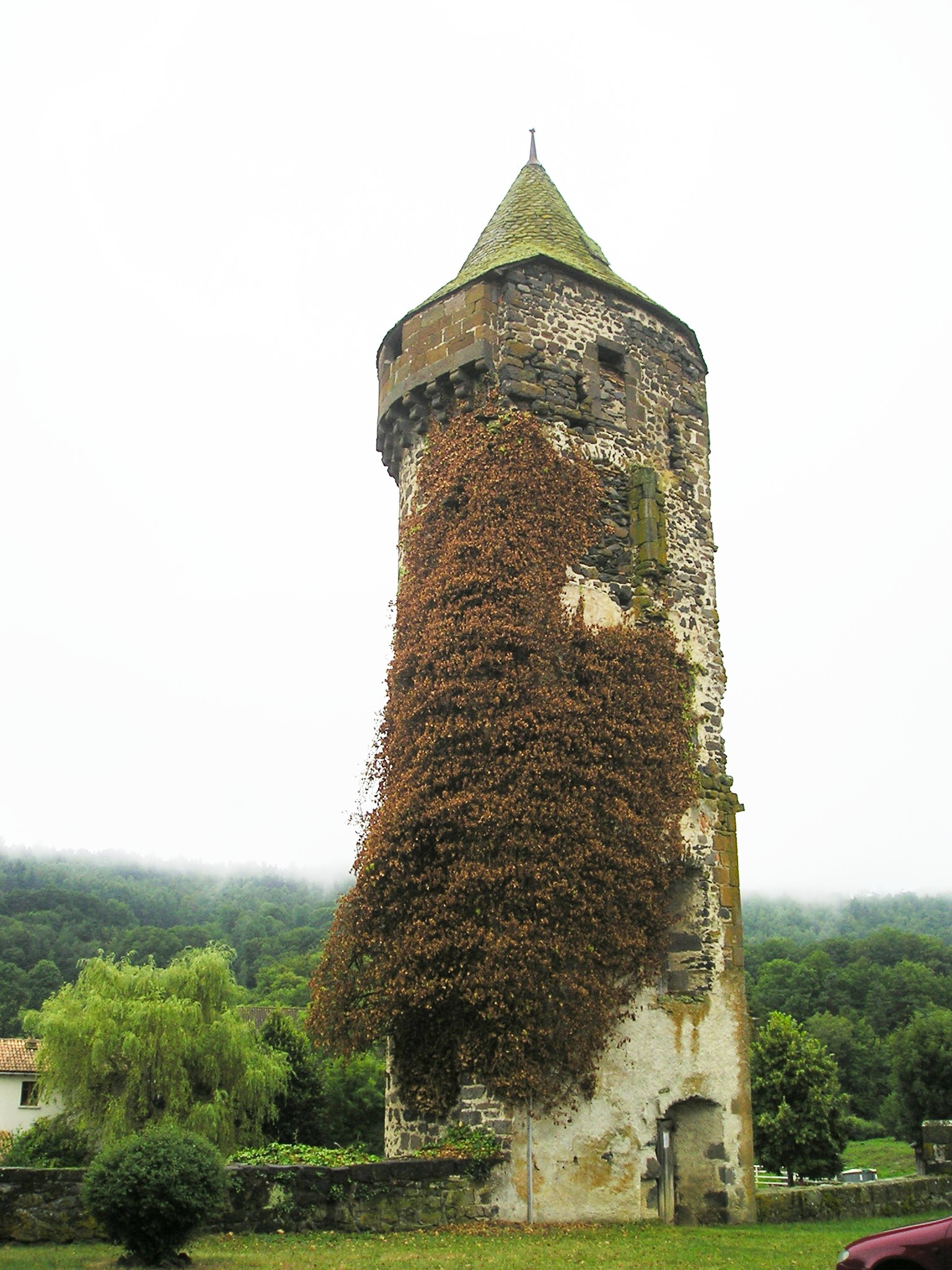
Tower
