= Departmental Council of Cantal =

Departmental legislature in France

Departmental Council of Cantal Conseil départemental de Cantal

Leadership
- President: Bruno Faure, LR since 17 July 2017

Structure
- Seats: 30
- Political groups: Government (26): DVD (13); LR (12); UDI (1); Opposition (4): PS (2); DVG (1); LÉ (1); www.cantal.fr

The Departmental Council of Cantal (French: Conseil départemental du Cantal) is the deliberative assembly of the French department of Cantal. It consists of 30 members (departmental councilors) and its headquarters are in Aurillac, capital of the department, and the president is Bruno Faure. The general councilors are elected for a 6-years term. The Council includes 8 vice-presidents.

== Composition ==
=== The president ===
The president of the General Council is currently Bruno Faure (LR).

=== Vice-presidents ===
List of vice-presidents of departmental council of Cantal
Order	Name	Party	Canton	Delegation
1st	Didier Achalme	UCD	Saint-Flour-1	Attractiveness
2nd	Sylvie Lachaize	LR	Aurillac-1	Social solidarity
3rd	Philippe Fabre	UCD	Vic-sur-Cère	Youth education and sport
4th	Valérie Cabécas-Roquier	UCD	Riom-ès-Montagnes	Territorial solidarity, culture and digital
5th	Gilles Chabrier	DIV	Murat	Climate transition
6th	Marie Hélène Chastre	LR	Mauriac	Children and the family
7th	Gilles Combelle	DVC	Saint-Paul-des-Landes	Economy
8th	Isabelle Lantuéjoul	LR	Arpajon-sur-Cère	General administration

=== Departmental councilors ===
The Departmental Council consists of 30 departmental councilors who are elected from the 15 cantons of Cantal. They are elected for a 6-years term.

== See also ==
- Cantal
- Departmental councils of France
- Departmental Council of Cantal (in French)
