= Cantons of the Cantal department =

The following is a list of the 15 cantons of the Cantal department, in France, following the French canton reorganisation which came into effect in March 2015:

- Arpajon-sur-Cère
- Aurillac-1
- Aurillac-2
- Aurillac-3
- Mauriac
- Maurs
- Murat
- Naucelles
- Neuvéglise-sur-Truyère
- Riom-ès-Montagnes
- Saint-Flour-1
- Saint-Flour-2
- Saint-Paul-des-Landes
- Vic-sur-Cère
- Ydes
