= Aurillac =

Prefecture and commune in Auvergne-Rhône-Alpes, France

Aurillac Orlhac (Occitan)
- Prefecture and commune
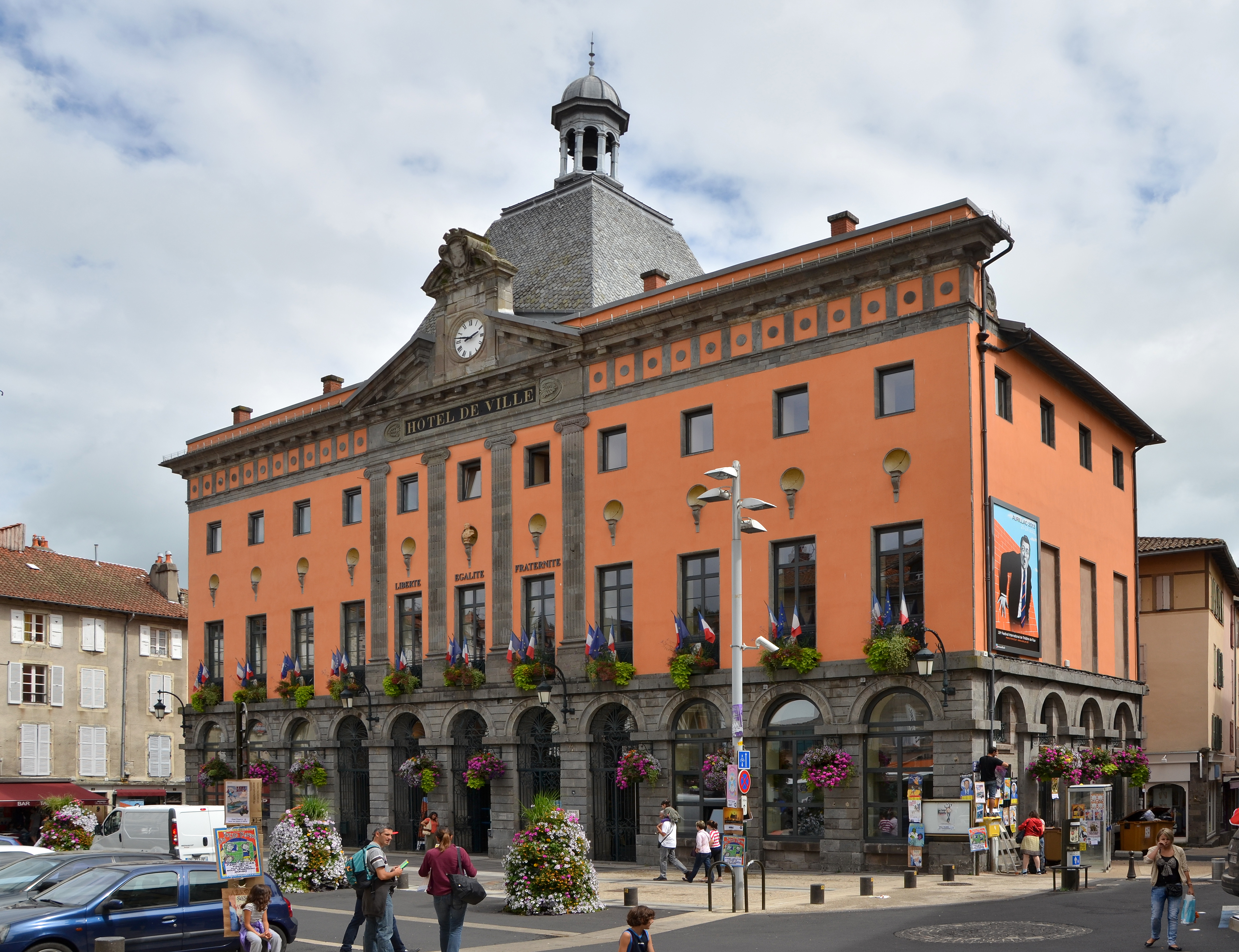
- The Hôtel de Ville

- Coat of arms
- Location of Aurillac
- Location within France Location within Auvergne-Rhône-Alpes
- Coordinates: 44°55′34″N 2°26′26″E
- Country: France
- Region: Auvergne-Rhône-Alpes
- Department: Cantal
- Arrondissement: Aurillac
- Canton: Aurillac-1, Aurillac-2, Aurillac-3
- Intercommunality: CA Aurillac Agglomération

Government
  - Mayor (2020–2026): Pierre Mathonier
- Area^{1}: 28.76 km^{2} (11.10 sq mi)
- Elevation: 622 m (2,041 ft)
- Highest elevation: 867 m (2,844 ft)
- Lowest elevation: 573 m (1,880 ft)
- Population (2023): 26,214
  - Density: 911.5/km^{2} (2,361/sq mi)
- Time zone: UTC+01:00 (CET)
  - Summer (DST): UTC+02:00 (CEST)
- INSEE/Postal code: 15014 /15000
- ^{1} French Land Register data, which excludes lakes, ponds, glaciers > 1 km^{2} (0.386 sq mi or 247 acres) and river estuaries.

Aurillac (French pronunciation: [oʁijak]; Occitan: Orlhac [uɾˈʎak]) is the prefecture of the Cantal department, in the Auvergne-Rhône-Alpes region of France.

== Geography ==
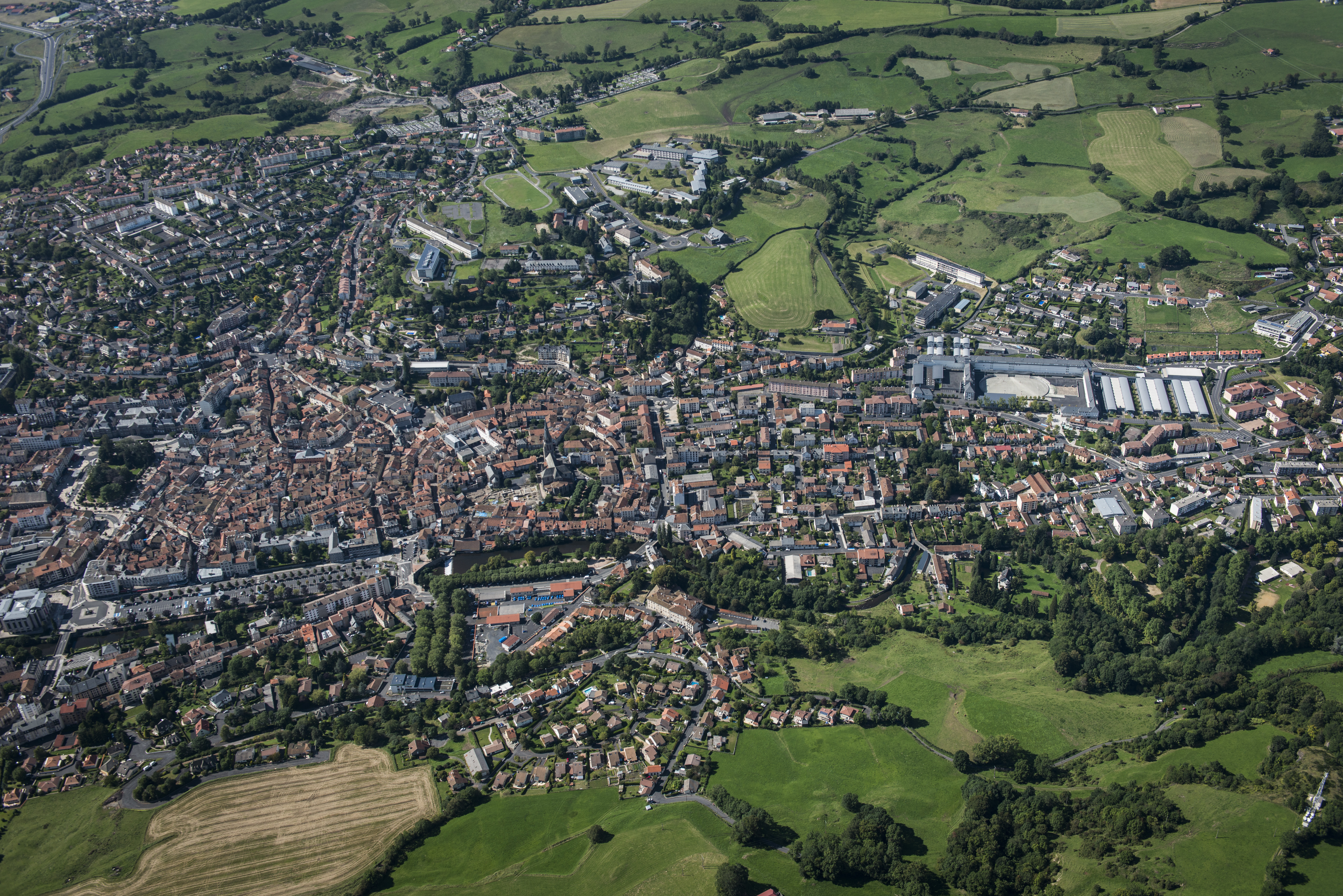
Aerial view of Aurillac

Aurillac is at 600 m (2,000 ft) above sea level and located at the foot of the Cantal mountains in a small sedimentary basin. The city is built on the banks of the Jordanne, a tributary of the Cère. It is 558 km (347 mi) south of Paris and 223 km (139 mi) north of Toulouse. Aurillac was part of a former Auvergne province called Haute-Auvergne and is only 20 km (12 mi) away from the heart of the Auvergne Volcano Park. Access to the commune is by numerous roads including the D922 from Naucelles in the north, the D17 from Saint-Simon in the north-east, Route nationale N122 from Polminhac in the east which continues to Sansac-de-Marmiesse in the south-west, the D920 to Arpajon-sur-Cère in the south-east, and the D18 to Ytrac in the west. Aurillac station, in the centre of town, lies on the Figeac-Arvant railway. It has rail connections to Clermont-Ferrand, Brive-la-Gaillarde and Toulouse. About 50% of the commune is urbanised with farmland to the east and west of the urban area.

Aurillac – Tronquières Airport is located in the south of the commune with its runway extending beyond the commune boundary. It is connected to Paris by two daily flights by the Air France subsidiary HOP!. The commune was awarded three flowers by the National Council of Towns and Villages in Bloom in the Competition of cities and villages in Bloom.

The Jordanne river flows through the heart of the commune from north to south where it joins the Cère just south of the commune.

=== Localities and districts ===
- Boudieu on the N122, which is called the Route de Sansac-de-Marmiesse or de Toulouse, is a farm with a farm house from the 1900s and three farm buildings.
- Boudieu-Bas on the N122 is a set of houses built in the 1960s with some buildings used commercially or for crafts.
- Gueret on the N122 is a farm with two houses and two agricultural buildings. This hamlet is traversed by an old country road from a place formerly called Julien from which name for the SNCF Julien Bridge comes. The former Julien is towards the Chateau of Tronquières in the urban area on Avenue Charles de Gaulle opposite the Medico-Surgical Centre (CMC). This farm with its house and barn were absorbed by the city on the creation of a district in the 1970s until the mid 1980s. The agricultural buildings were demolished to make room for a shop.
- La Sablère on the RN122 is a set of dwellings mostly from the 1980s. Originally there was a farm. This place spreads over two communes: Aurillac and Arpajon-sur-Cère with the majority of the buildings in Arpajon-sur-Cère.
- Le Barra near the avenue Aristide Briand, also called the Ancienne route de Vic or the old N120. This is a farm and houses.
- Les Quatre Chemins at the intersection of the D120 and the D922 on the borders of Aurillac, Naucelles, and Ytrac. It is a complex of commercial buildings and residences on the crossroads of the two former National highways.
- Tronquières on an avenue. Originally it was a farm with a chateau but the chateau and outbuildings were demolished in 2011. Today it is a grouping of housing units specializing in housing assistance for the integration of disabled people (ADAPEI) and the airport. It is the reception area for travellers to the city and a former landfill and rubbish centre. Before the construction of the airport the meadows were areas for summer grazing for nearby farms such as the Boudieu farm.

=== Climate ===
Influenced by its altitude, Aurillac features an oceanic climate (Cfb), closely bordering on a warm-summer humid continental climate (Dfb) under the Köppen system. In spite of this, the city enjoys more than 2,100 hours of sunshine per year on average, but also a high amount of precipitations per year on average. The record low temperature was −24.5 °C (−12 °F) on 9 January 1985 and the record high was 38.0 °C (100 °F) on 30 July 1983.

Climate data for Aurillac, elevation 632 m (2,073 ft), (1991–2020 normals, extremes 1945–present)
Month	Jan	Feb	Mar	Apr	May	Jun	Jul	Aug	Sep	Oct	Nov	Dec	Year
Record high °C (°F)	19.6 (67.3)	23.3 (73.9)	23.5 (74.3)	26.5 (79.7)	31.8 (89.2)	38.1 (100.6)	38.0 (100.4)	37.7 (99.9)	33.5 (92.3)	31.2 (88.2)	23.2 (73.8)	20.7 (69.3)	38.1 (100.6)
Mean daily maximum °C (°F)	6.9 (44.4)	8.1 (46.6)	11.9 (53.4)	14.5 (58.1)	18.4 (65.1)	22.2 (72.0)	24.6 (76.3)	24.6 (76.3)	20.5 (68.9)	16.2 (61.2)	10.7 (51.3)	7.7 (45.9)	15.5 (59.9)
Daily mean °C (°F)	3.2 (37.8)	3.6 (38.5)	6.8 (44.2)	9.2 (48.6)	13.0 (55.4)	16.5 (61.7)	18.5 (65.3)	18.5 (65.3)	14.8 (58.6)	11.5 (52.7)	6.7 (44.1)	4.0 (39.2)	10.5 (50.9)
Mean daily minimum °C (°F)	−0.5 (31.1)	−0.8 (30.6)	1.7 (35.1)	4.0 (39.2)	7.6 (45.7)	10.7 (51.3)	12.5 (54.5)	12.4 (54.3)	9.1 (48.4)	6.9 (44.4)	2.8 (37.0)	0.3 (32.5)	5.6 (42.1)
Record low °C (°F)	−24.5 (−12.1)	−18.0 (−0.4)	−15.2 (4.6)	−9.1 (15.6)	−2.5 (27.5)	0.1 (32.2)	2.4 (36.3)	0.7 (33.3)	−2.9 (26.8)	−8.1 (17.4)	−11.6 (11.1)	−15.9 (3.4)	−24.5 (−12.1)
Average precipitation mm (inches)	90.0 (3.54)	76.5 (3.01)	79.4 (3.13)	108.5 (4.27)	107.4 (4.23)	82.3 (3.24)	70.8 (2.79)	88.4 (3.48)	106.9 (4.21)	100.5 (3.96)	117.8 (4.64)	106.2 (4.18)	1,134.7 (44.67)
Average precipitation days (≥ 1.0 mm)	12.1	10.7	10.9	11.9	11.9	9.2	7.9	9.0	9.1	10.9	12.6	12.4	128.7
Mean monthly sunshine hours	105.3	126.6	176.1	185.3	211.3	243.5	272.2	257.9	210.9	153.2	103.8	100.2	2,146.4
Source: Meteociel

== Toponymy ==
The origin of the name Aurillac is from Aureliacum meaning "Villa of Aurelius" and dates back to the Gallo-Roman era. It is attested in the polygonal Fanum d'Aron which was built in the 1st century and discovered in 1977 at Lescudillier.

== History ==
It is thought that in the Gallic era the original site of the city was on the heights overlooking the current city at Saint-Jean-de-Dône ("Dône" from dunum) and, like most oppida, it was abandoned after the Roman conquest in favour of a new city established on the plain. With the return of instability in the Lower Roman Empire there was a movement towards Encastellation and a new fortified site was established in mid-slope between the former oppidum and the old Gallo-Roman city where the Chateau of Saint-Étienne is today.

The history of the city is really only known from 856, the year of the birth of Count Gerald of Aurillac at the castle where his father, also named Gerald, was lord. In 885 he founded a Benedictine monastery which later bore his name. It was in this monastery that Gerbert, the first French pope under the name of Sylvester II, studied.

The city was made in a Sauveté (Note: In the Middle Ages in the south of France an area of extra-territoriality protected by the Catholic Church.) area which was located between four crosses and was founded in 898 by Gerald shortly after the abbey. The first urban area was circular and built close to the Abbey of Aurillac. Gerald died around 910 but his influence was such that over the centuries Gerald was always a baptismal name prevalent in the population of Aurillac and the surrounding area.

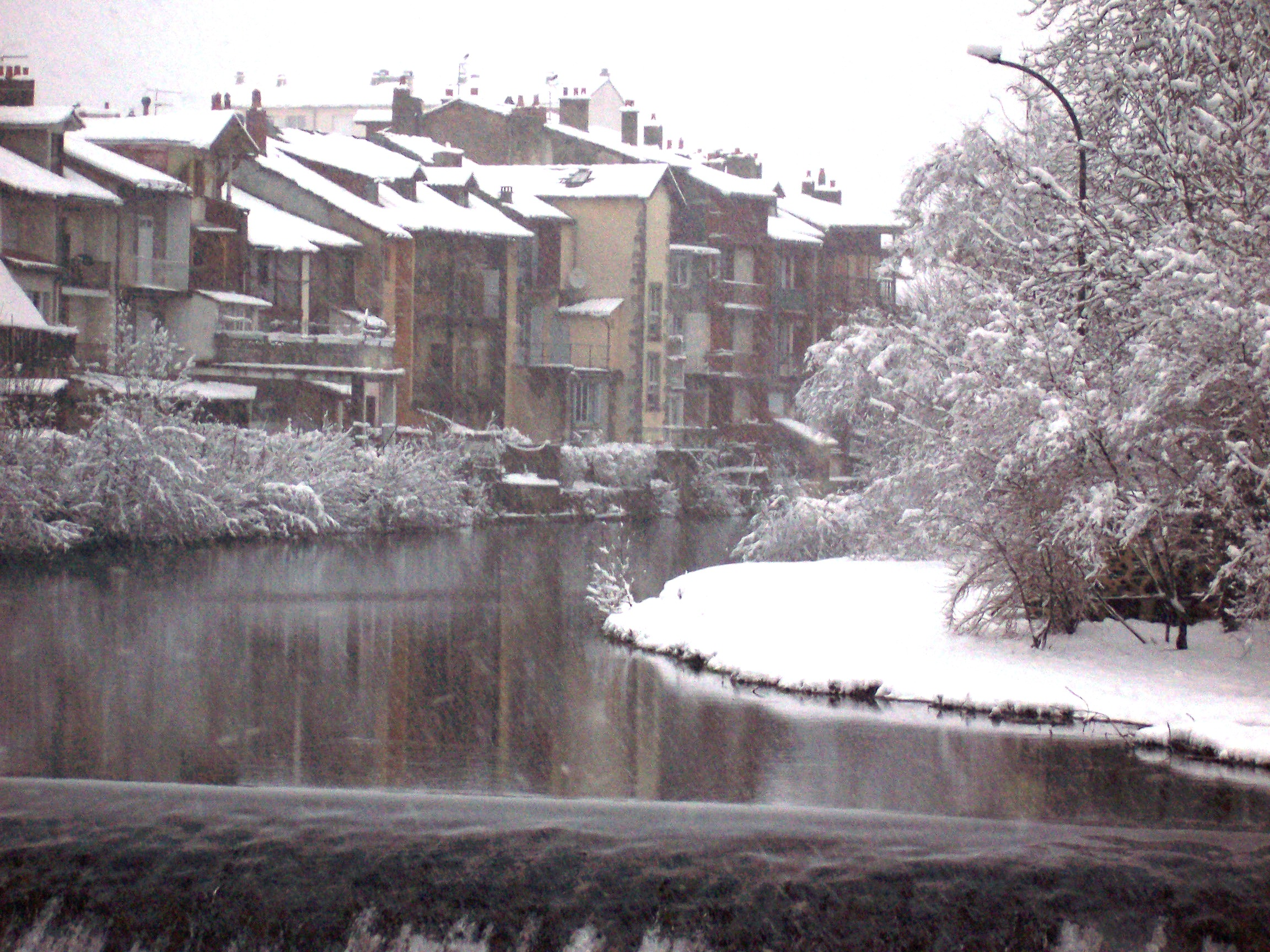
Houses along the Jordanne

It was in the 13th century that municipal conflict began between consuls and abbots. After taking the Château of Saint-Étienne in 1255 and two negotiated agreements called the Peace of Aurillac, relations were normalised.

In the 13th and 14th centuries Aurillac withstood several sieges by the English and in the 16th century continued to suffer from civil and religious wars.

The influence of the abbey declined with its secularization and its implementation of orders.

In 1569 the city was delivered by treason to the Protestants: people were tortured and held to ransom and the Abbey was sacked. The library and archives were all burned.

Before the French Revolution Aurillac had a Présidial and carried the title of capital of the Haute-Auvergne. In 1790 on the creation of departments, after a period of alternating with Saint-Flour, Aurillac definitively became the capital of Cantal.

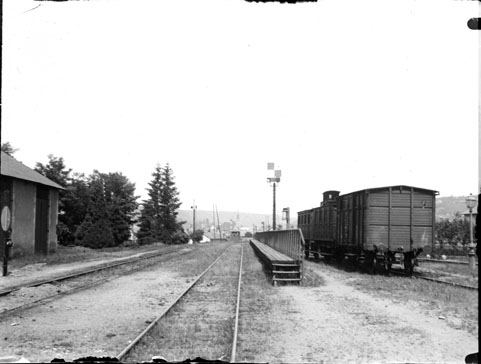
The Station at Aurillac in 1898

The arrival of the railway in 1866 accelerated the development of the city.

At the first census in 1759 there were 6,268 people in Aurillac, it now has about 28,000.

=== Heraldry ===
Arms of Aurillac	The traditional arms of Aurillac. The three silver shells were originally on one line because Aurillac was a stage on the Way of St. James coming from Clermont-Ferrand (currently the Via Arvernha). The three fleurs-de-lis gold indicated a Good Town at a time when Aurillac provided a body of two hundred picked men to King Charles VII to fight the British. Blazon: Gules, three escallops of Argent 2 and 1, in chief Azure, three fleurs-de-lis of Or.

Arms of Aurillac Abbey	The traditional arms of the Abbey and County of Aurillac. These arms were originally on the banner of the abbey representing a patch of grass, evoking a miraculous fact related by Odo of Cluny in his Life of Saint Gerald of Aurillac. Blazon: Party per pale, Or and Vert, the border engrailed of one on the other.

== Government ==
=== Cantons ===
Aurillac is the capital of the department of Cantal (seat of the prefecture) and of the Arrondissement of Aurillac as well as for three cantons (INSEE names):

- Aurillac-1: Ytrac and part of Aurillac
- Aurillac-2: part of Aurillac
- Aurillac-3: part of Aurillac

=== Administration ===
List of Successive Mayors

Mayors from the French Revolution to 1941

From	To	Name
1789		Louis de Lorus
1790		Joseph François Gourlat de Saint-Étienne
1794	1798	François Armand
1798	1800	Jean Baptiste Perret
1800	1813	Jean Abadie
1813	1815	Jean Baptiste Perret
1815	1829	Louis Delom de Lalaubie
1829	1833	Hippolyte Esquirou de Parieu
1833	1840	Pierre Esquirou Lavignac
1840	1848	Louis-Furcy Grognier
1848	1848	Amédée Delzons
1848	1870	Hippolyte Esquirou de Parieu
1871	1874	Émile Genestie
1874	1887	Antoine Joseph Géraud Cabanes
1887	1889	Géraud Lusser
1889	1911	Francis Fesq
1911	1919	François Volpilhac
1919	1935	Louis Amant Dauzier
1935	1941	Jean Chanal

Mayors from 1941

From	To	Name	Party	Position
1941	1944	Antony Joly		Appointed by the Vichy Regime. Textile Entrepreneur
1944	1947	Jean Chanal		Doctor, Former Mayor
1947	1953	Henri Tricot		Dentist, Legion of Honour
1953	1965	Paul Joseph Amable Piales		Industrialist, Legion of Honour, Senator for Cantal 1948-1971
1965	1971	Jacques Meyniel	PS	Son of Mayor Louis Meyniel, MP for Cantal
1971	1977	Jean Mézard	CNIP	Doctor, President of the General Council
1977	1995	René Souchon	PS	
1995	2001	Yvon Bec	MDC	
2001	2006	René Souchon	PS	Resigned to become President of the Auvergne Regional Council
2006	2013	Alain Calmette	PS	General Counsellor, MP for Cantal from 2012
2013	2026	Pierre Mathonier	PS	

=== Twinning ===
Aurillac has twinning associations with:

- Bocholt (Germany) since 1972.
- Bassetlaw (United Kingdom) since 1980.
- Bougouni (Mali) since 1985.
- Altea (Spain) since 1992.
- Vorona (Romania) since 2000.

== Demography ==
The inhabitants of the commune are known as Aurillacois or Aurillacoises in French.

Historical population

Year	Pop.	±% p.a.
1793	10,470	—
1800	10,357	−0.15%
1806	10,523	+0.27%
1821	9,190	−0.90%
1831	9,766	+0.61%
1836	10,889	+2.20%
1841	9,753	−2.18%
1846	9,609	−0.30%
1851	10,917	+2.59%
1856	9,846	−2.04%
1861	9,831	−0.03%
1866	10,998	+2.27%
1872	11,098	+0.15%
1876	11,211	+0.25%
1881	13,727	+4.13%
1886	14,613	+1.26%
1891	15,824	+1.61%
1896	16,886	+1.31%
1901	17,459	+0.67%

Year	Pop.	±% p.a.
1906	17,772	+0.36%
1911	18,038	+0.30%
1921	16,389	−0.95%
1926	17,153	+0.92%
1931	17,643	+0.56%
1936	19,041	+1.54%
1946	22,174	+1.53%
1954	22,224	+0.03%
1962	24,563	+1.26%
1968	28,226	+2.34%
1975	30,863	+1.28%
1982	30,963	+0.05%
1990	30,773	−0.08%
1999	30,551	−0.08%
2007	28,943	−0.67%
2012	27,074	−1.33%
2017	25,499	−1.19%
2023	26,214	+0.46%

Source: EHESS and INSEE

== Economy ==
- Aurillac is the seat of the Chamber of Commerce and Industry of Cantal which manages commercial villages (including that of Tronquières in Aurillac). Aurillac Airport is managed by the CABA (Urban Community of the Aurillac Basin Agglomeration).

=== Shops ===
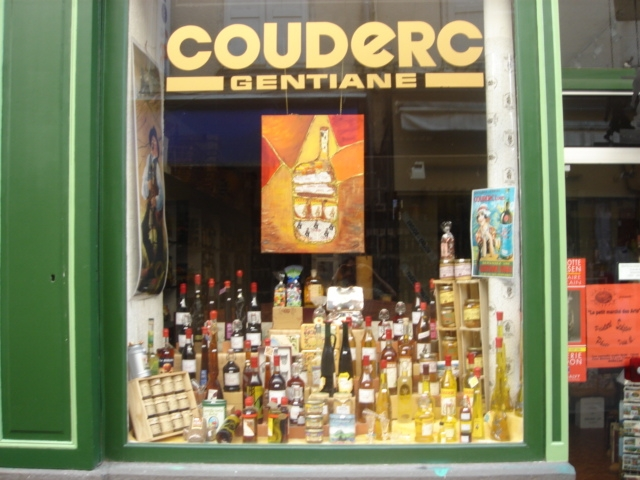
Boutique Gentiane Couderc

Aurillac has hundreds of boutiques, shops, and artisans.

=== Industry ===
- Processing of agricultural products, particularly milk and meat. Manufacturing and packaging of Cantal cheese.
- Historic French capital of umbrellas with half of French production - 250,000 units in 1999 - and provides 100 jobs. After declining for several decades at the end of the 20th century, Aurillac umbrella producers decided to join their forces and created the Economic Interest Group, or GIE in 1997. They then launched their products under a single label, L'Aurillac Parapluie (The Aurillac Umbrella).
- Aurillac is also the seat of what was the European leader in healthcare duvets and pillows: Abeil and the plasturgist Auriplast specializes in injection and electroplating.

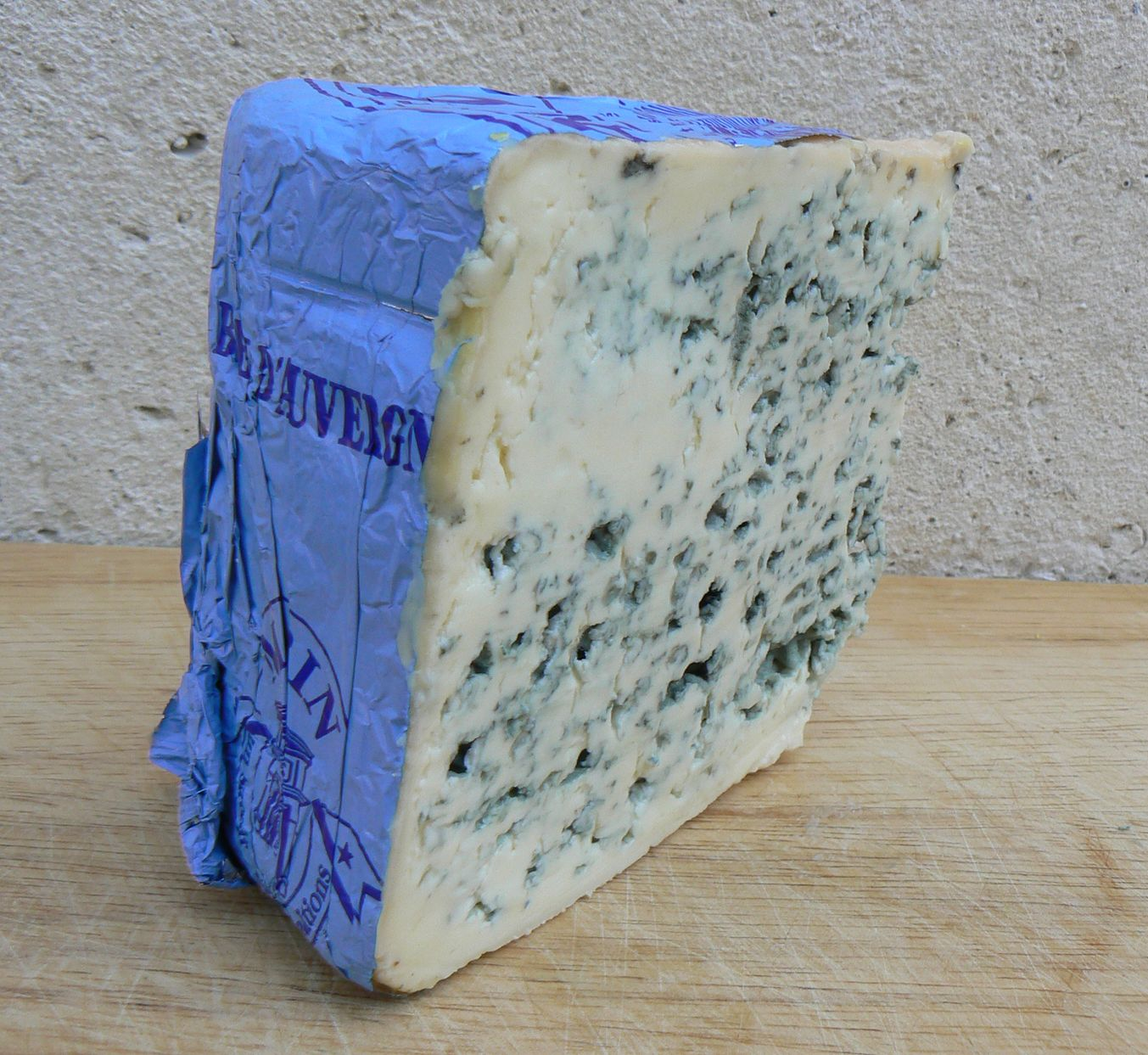
Bleu d'Auvergne

Aurillac is also home to several food businesses. These include the Couderc distillery, which produces gentian liqueur, the Leroux and Bonal cheese factories, the Morin refinery, MAS charcuteries, Teil cured meats by the Altitude group, refrigerated transport operator Olano Ladoux.

Aurillac is best known for its Cheese centre based on the heights of Aurillac close to the Chateau Saint-Étienne. It was established in 1993, the structure consists of an association bringing together many organisations to develop scientific programs. It develops scientific programs relating to the cheese sector.

=== Data processing ===
Aurillac hosts several websites:

- video games with Jeuxvideo.com
- trucks with Net-truck
- aeronautical accessories with Aerodiscount

Aurillac has also been the headquarters of the ERP vendor Qualiac since 1979.

== Culture and heritage ==
The commune has a very large number of buildings and structures that are registered as historical monuments. There are also a very large number of items which are registered as historical objects in various locations.

=== Civil heritage ===
Some of the most interesting sites are:

- The Chateau of Saint-Etienne (9th century) which overlooks the city.
- The Aurillac National Stud
- The Musée des volcans (Museum of Volcanos), at the château Saint-Étienne
- The Musée d'art et d'archéologie d'Aurillac (Museum of Art and Archaeology), 37 rue des Carmes
- The former Consul's House.
- The former Présidial
- The former Jesuit College
- The Palace of Justice (1872)
- The Prison (1855)
- The Police Station (1872)
- The Hôtel de Ville (town hall) (1806)
- The Prefecture (19th century)
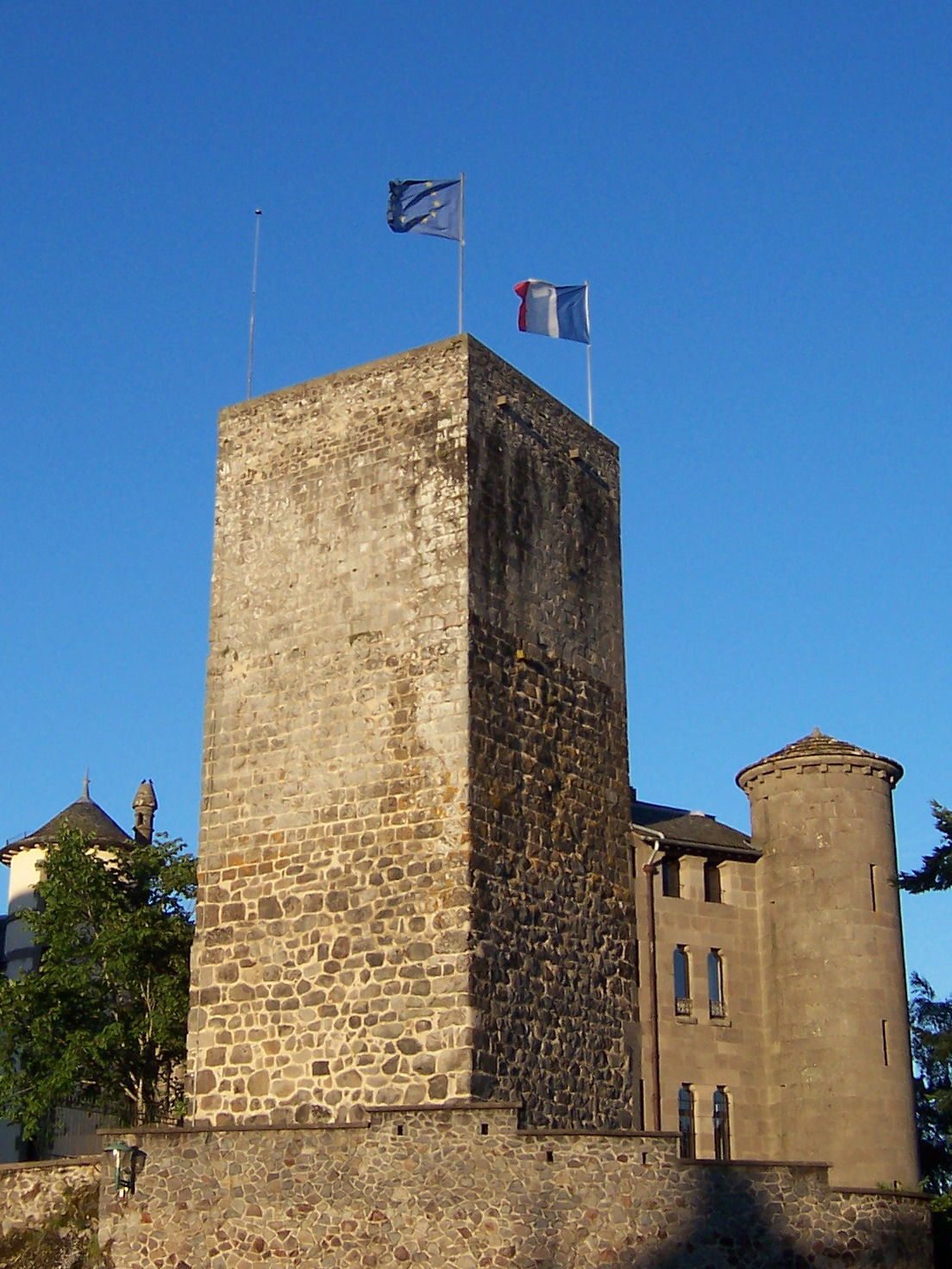
The Château of Saint-Étienne

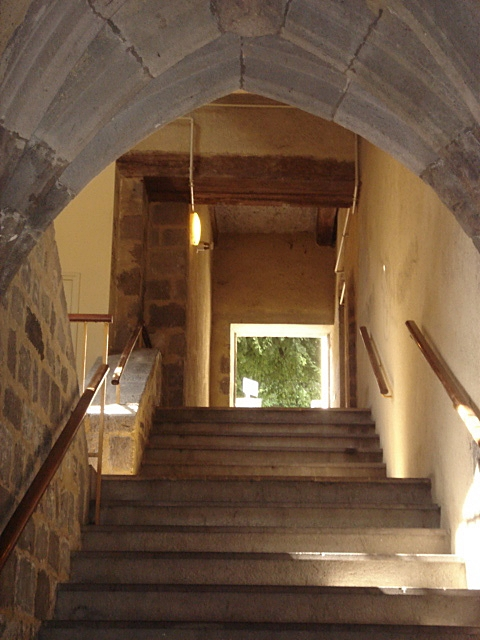
Stairs in the Présidial

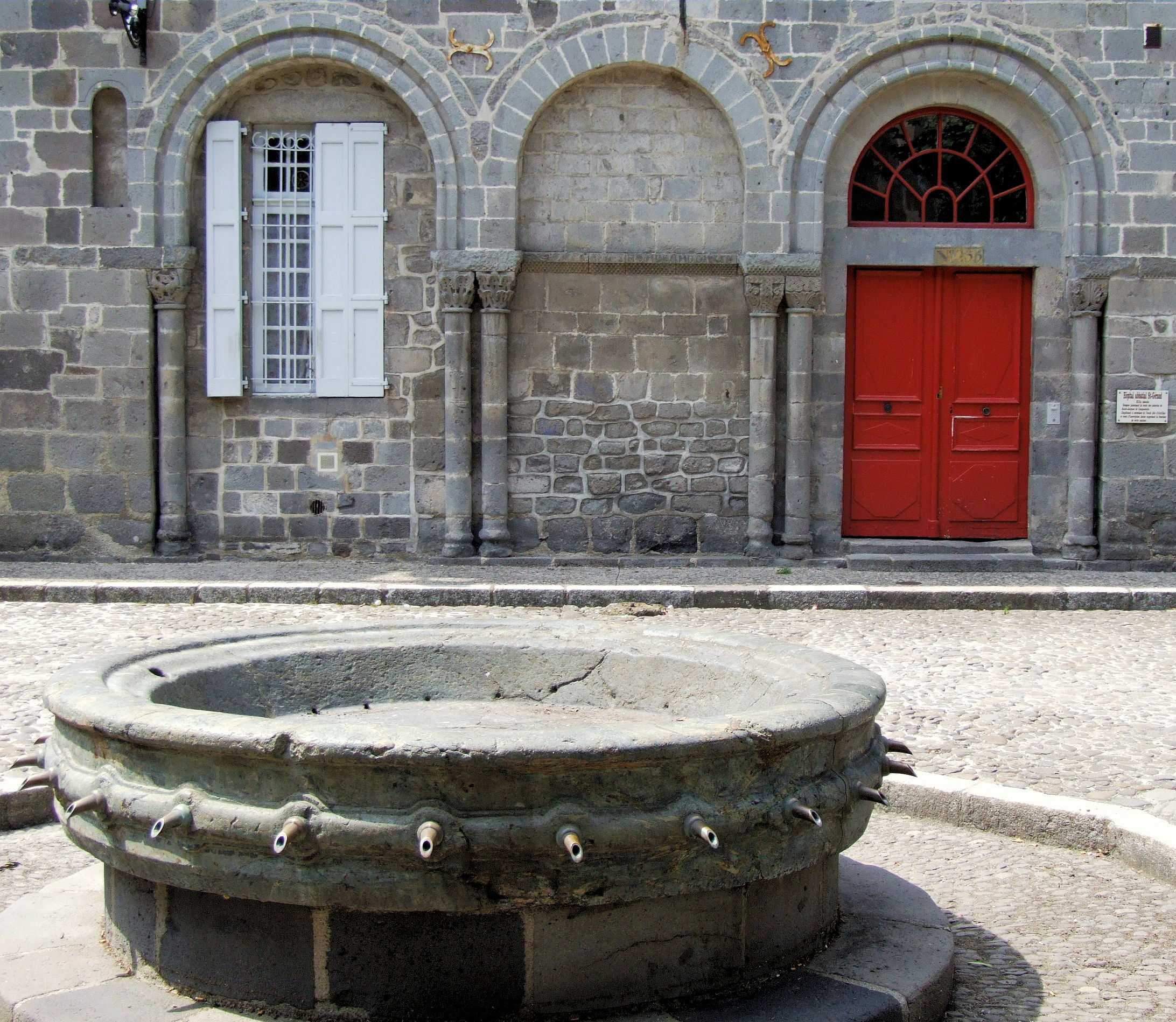
Remains of the Abbey hospital of Saint-Géraud

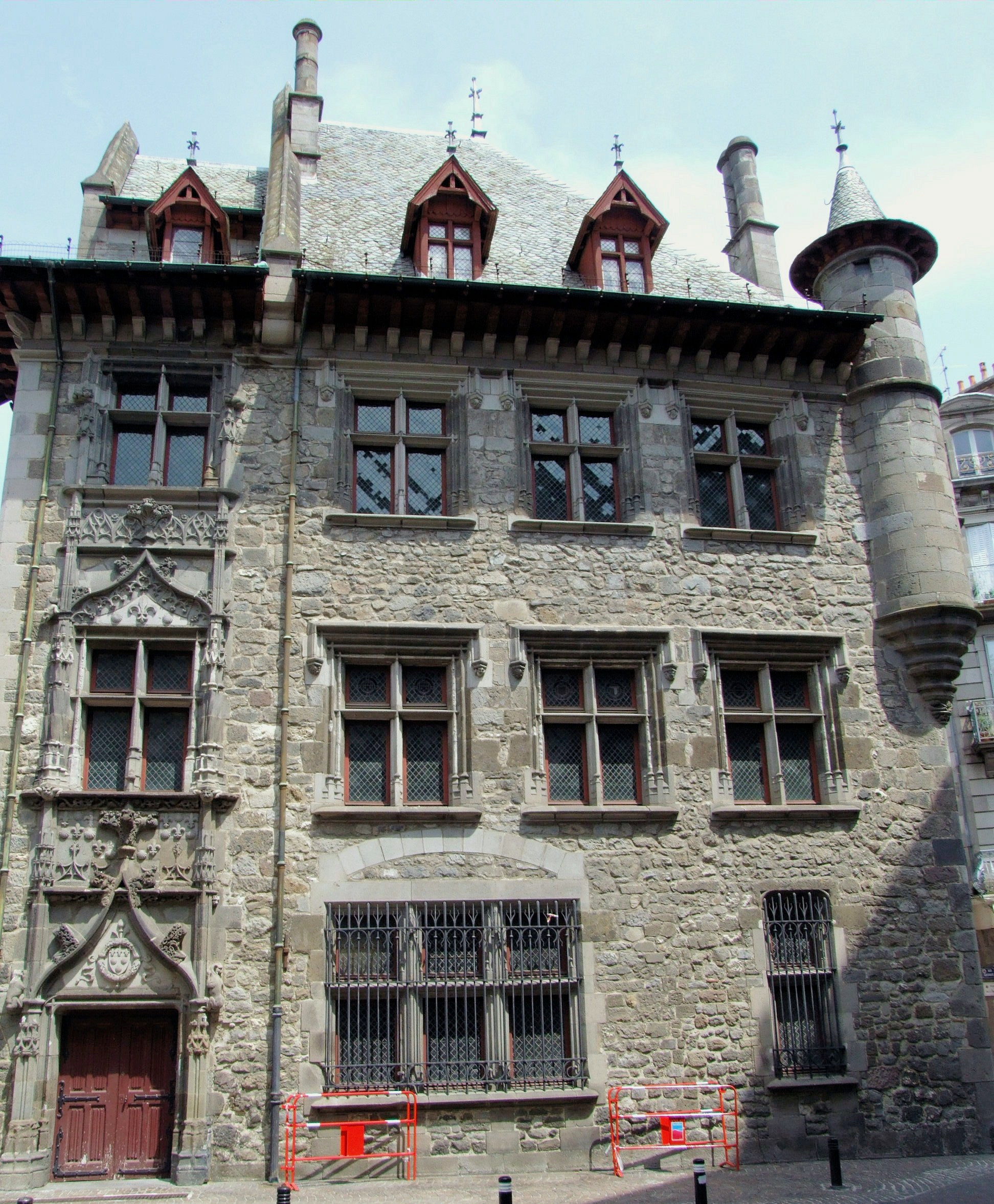
The Consul's House

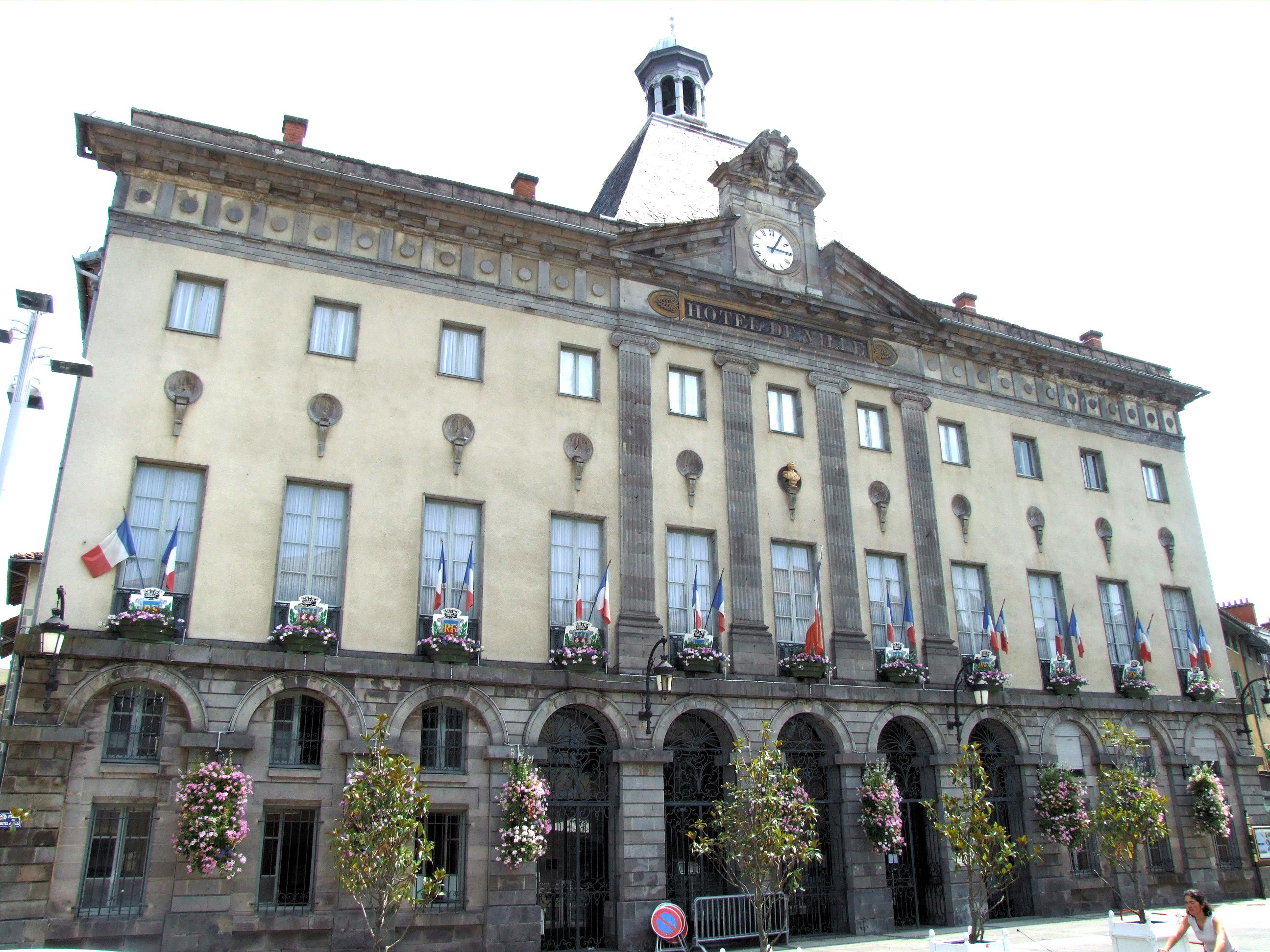
The Town Hall

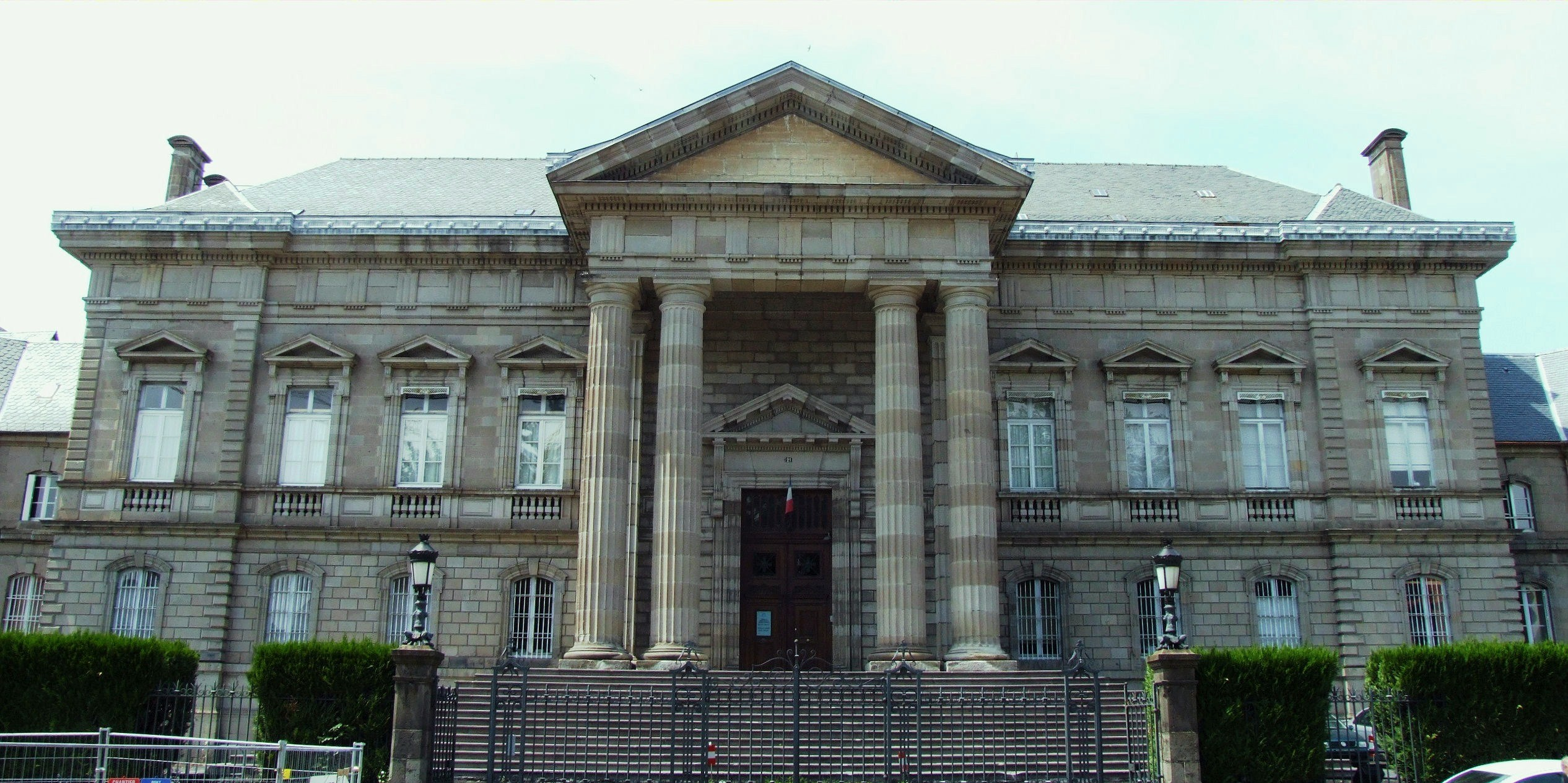
The Palace of Justice

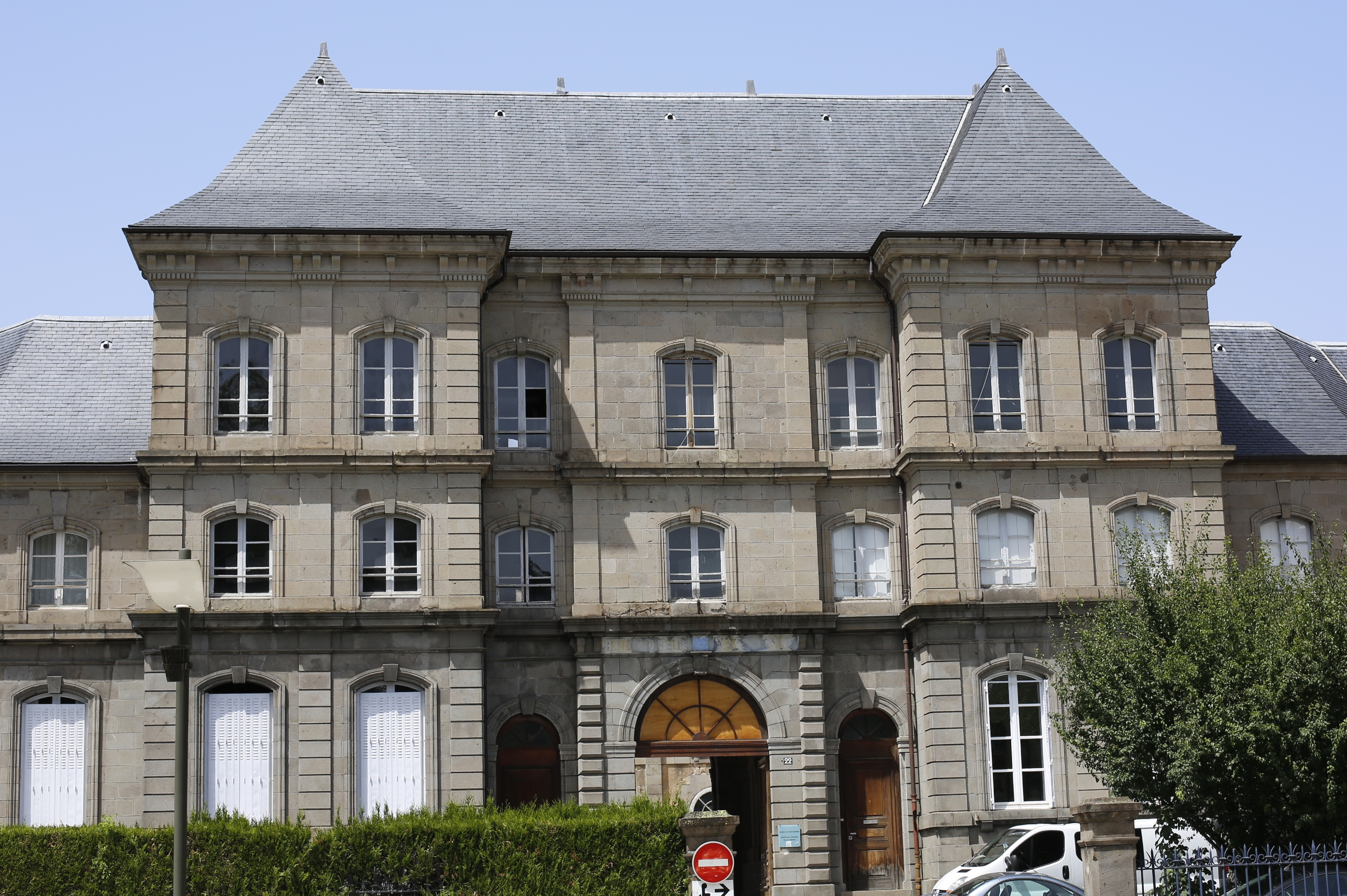
The Police Station

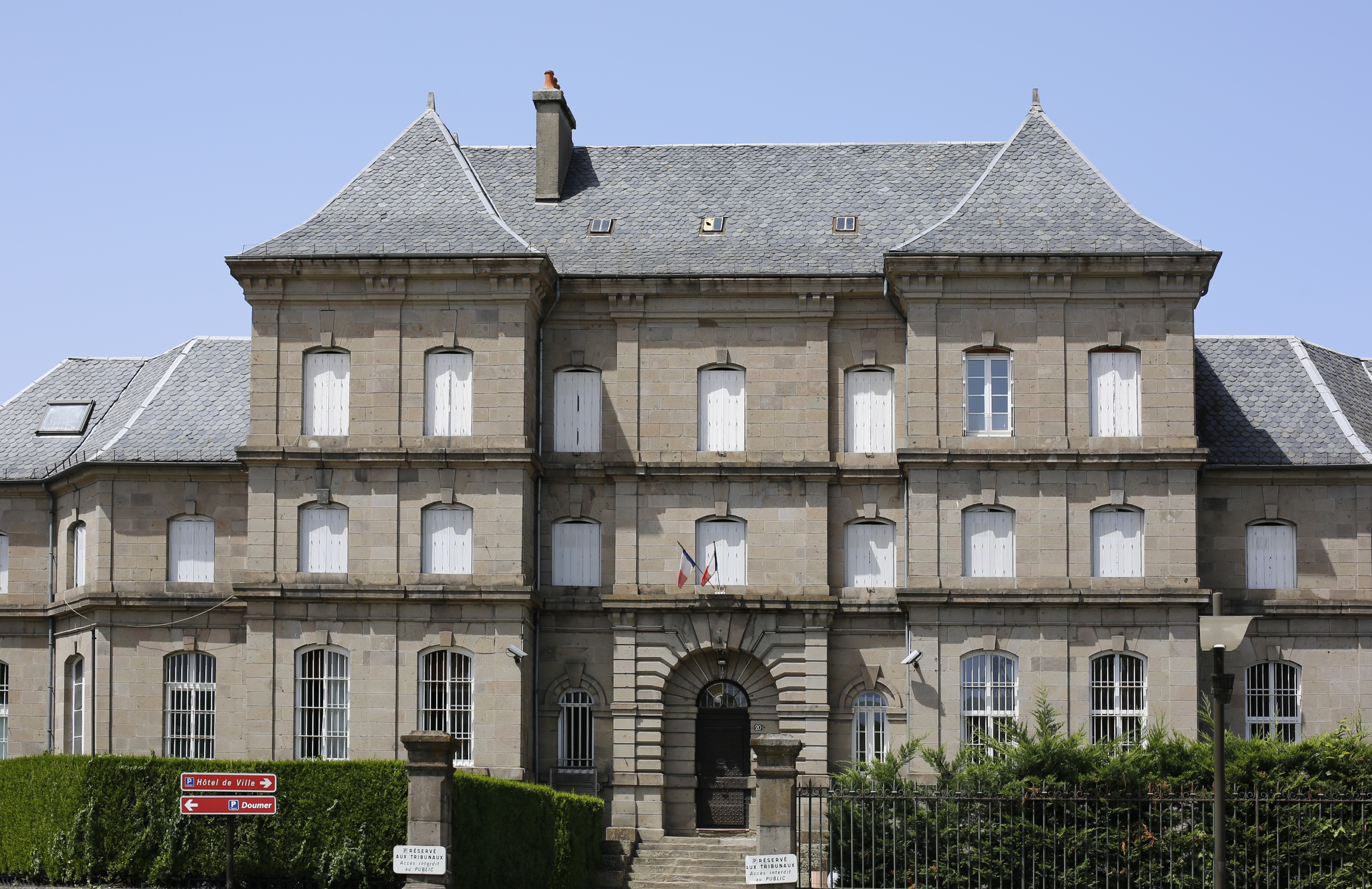
The Prison

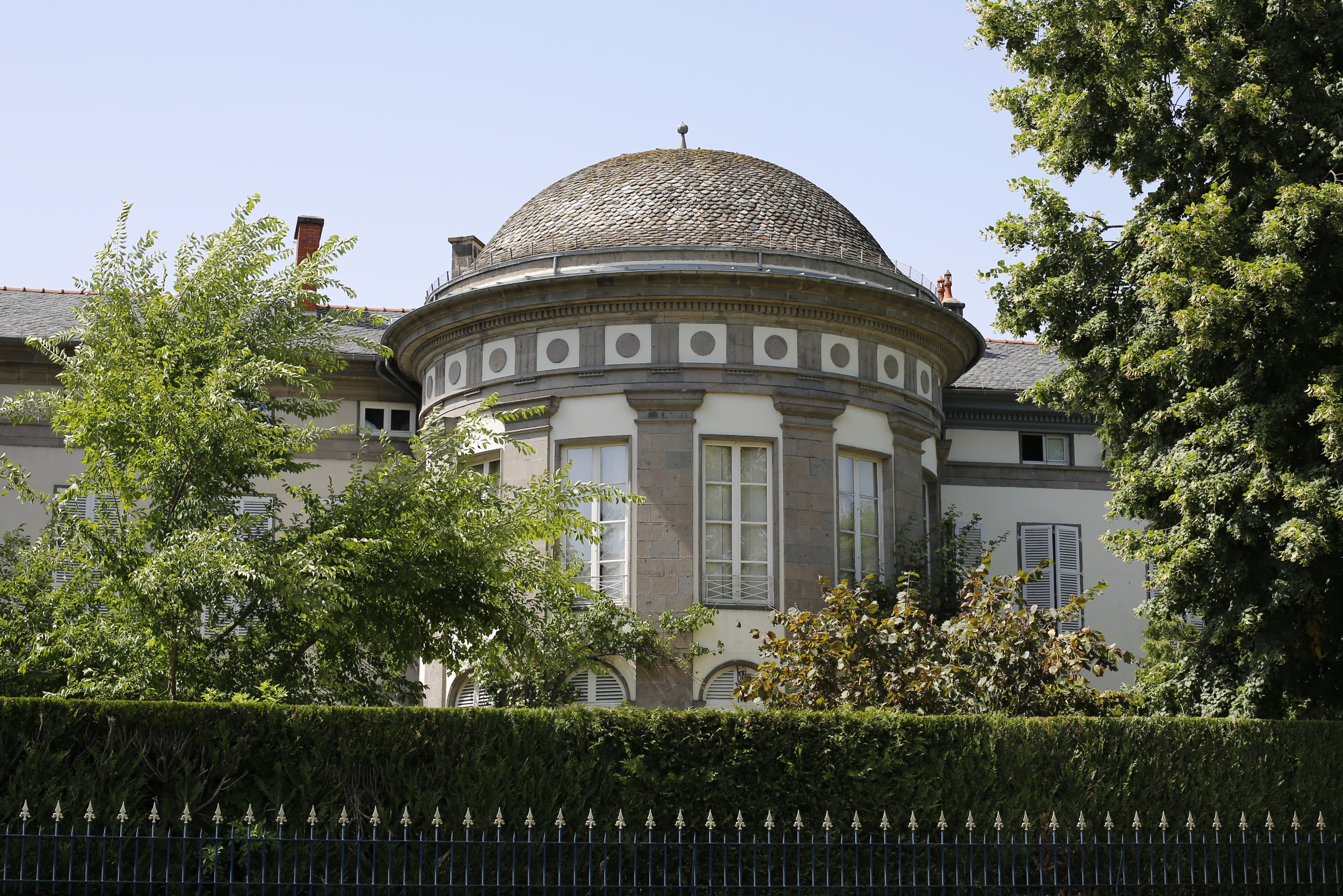
The Prefecture

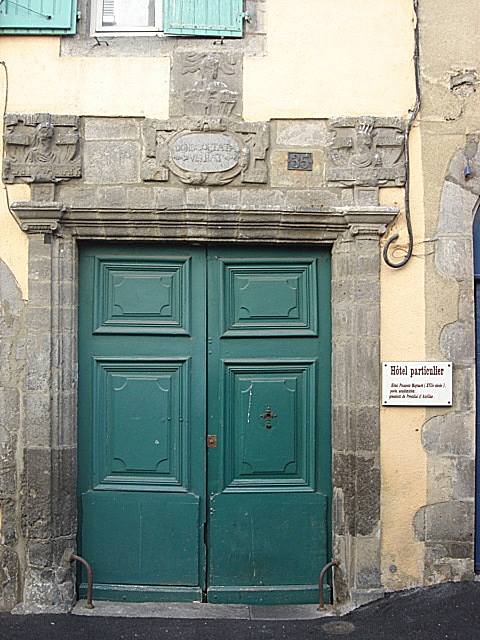
The Hotel Meynard

=== Religious heritage ===
The commune has several religious buildings and structures that are registered as historical monuments:

- The Abbey Saint-Géraud (11th century). The Abbey has several items that are registered as historical objects:
  - The Organ (1760)
  - The Instrumental part of the Organ (1760)
  - A Reliquary of Saint Blaise (17th century)
  - A Reliquary of Saint Benoît (17th century)
  - A Reliquary of Saint Odon (17th century)
- The Church of Notre-Dame-aux-Neiges (1332). The chapel contains a large number of items which are registered as historical objects.
- The Church of Sacré Coeur (1937). The chapel has one group of items that is registered as an historical object:
  - Interior Decor, Stained glass, Reliefs, paintings, and mosaics (20th century)
- The Chapel of Aurinques (1616). The chapel has a number of items that are registered as historical objects:
  - A Bronze Bell (1554)
  - An Ex-voto Painting: Procession of Acts of Grace (1701)
  - An Ex-voto Painting: Deliverance of the Town (18th century)
  - An Ex-voto Painting: Attack on the Town (1701)
  - A Glass wall: Virgin and Child (163)
- The Church of Saint-Joseph-Ouvrier (20th century)
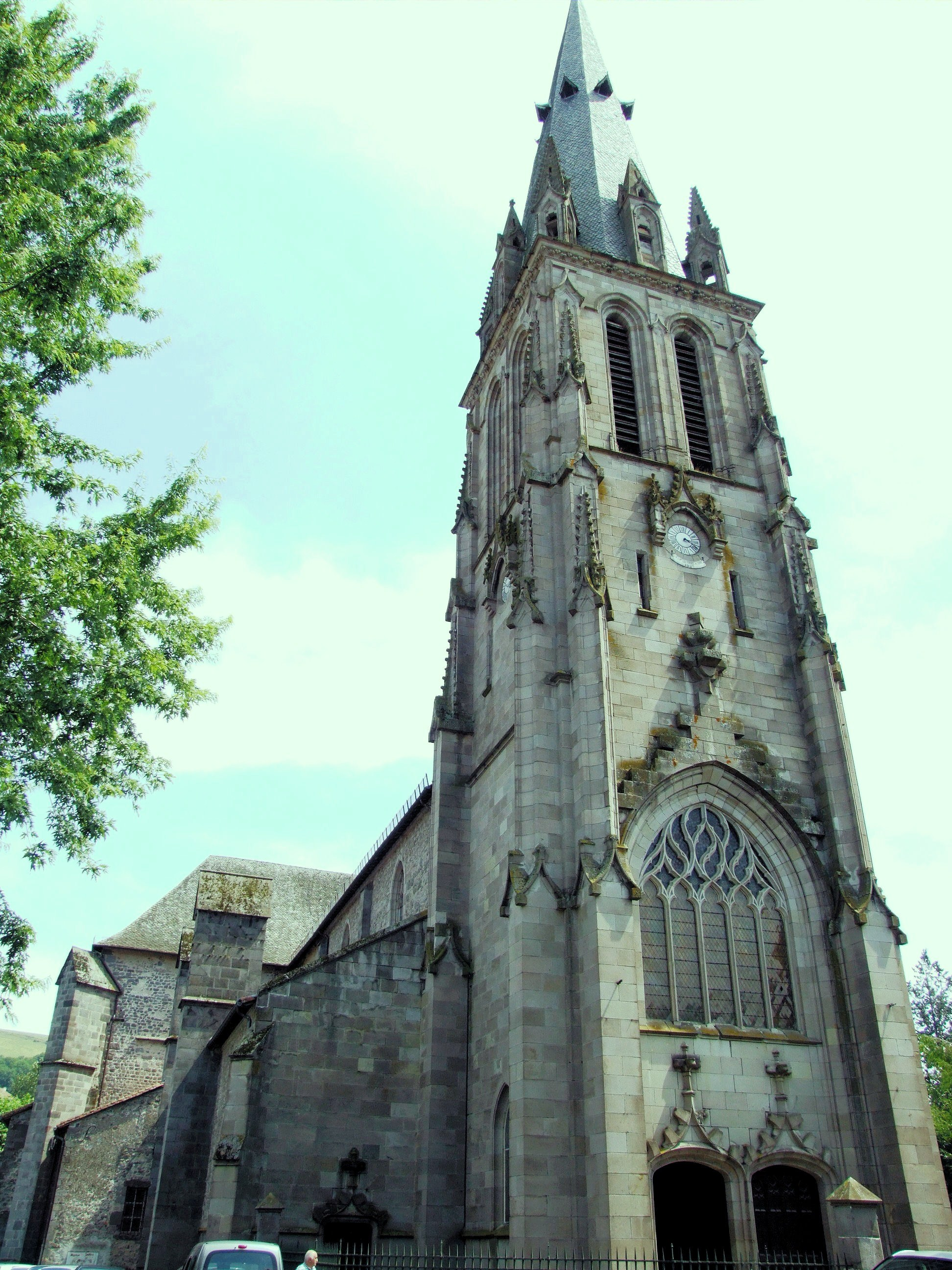
Church of Saint-Géraud (old Abbey)

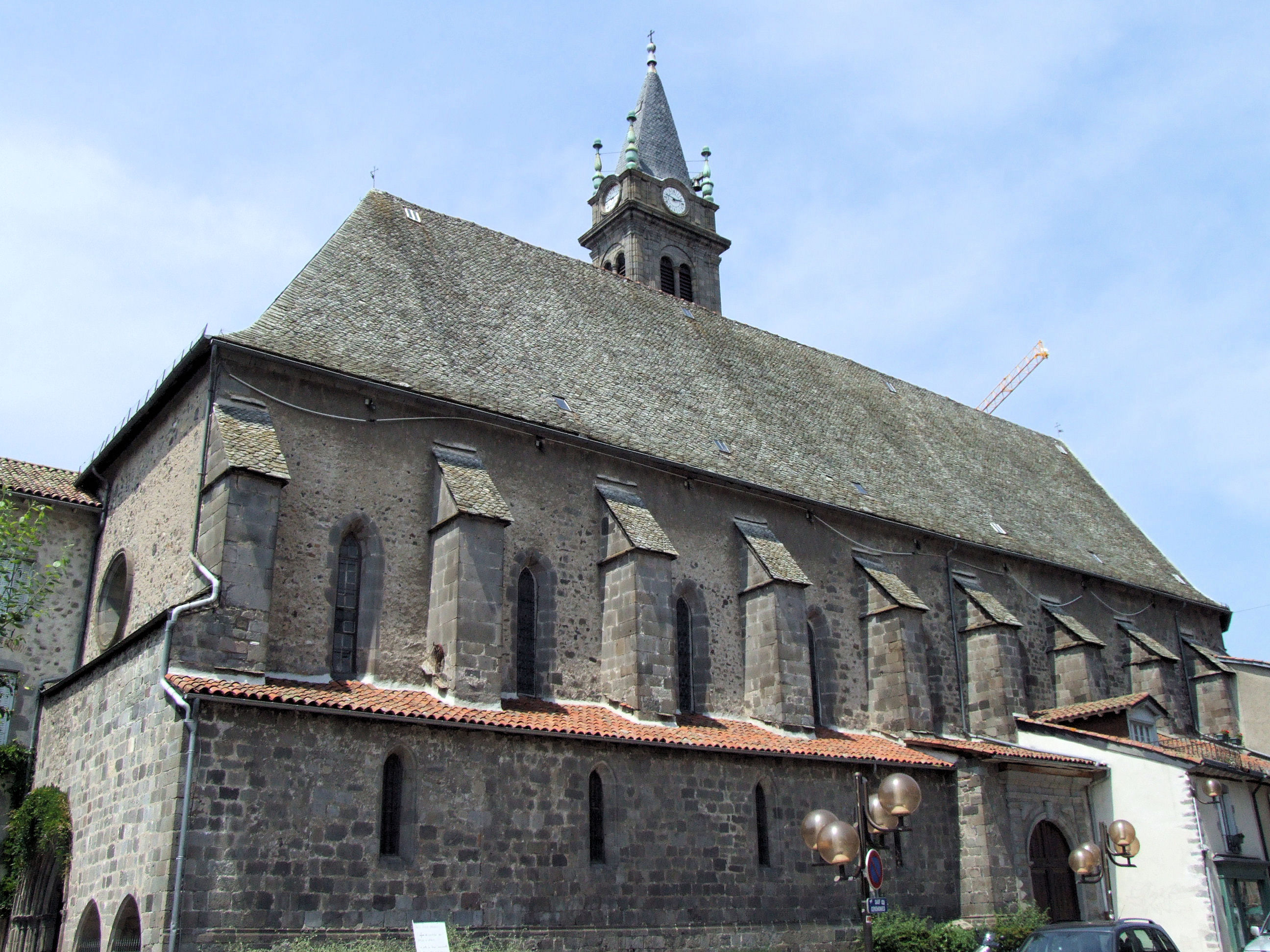
Church of Notre-Dame-aux-Neiges

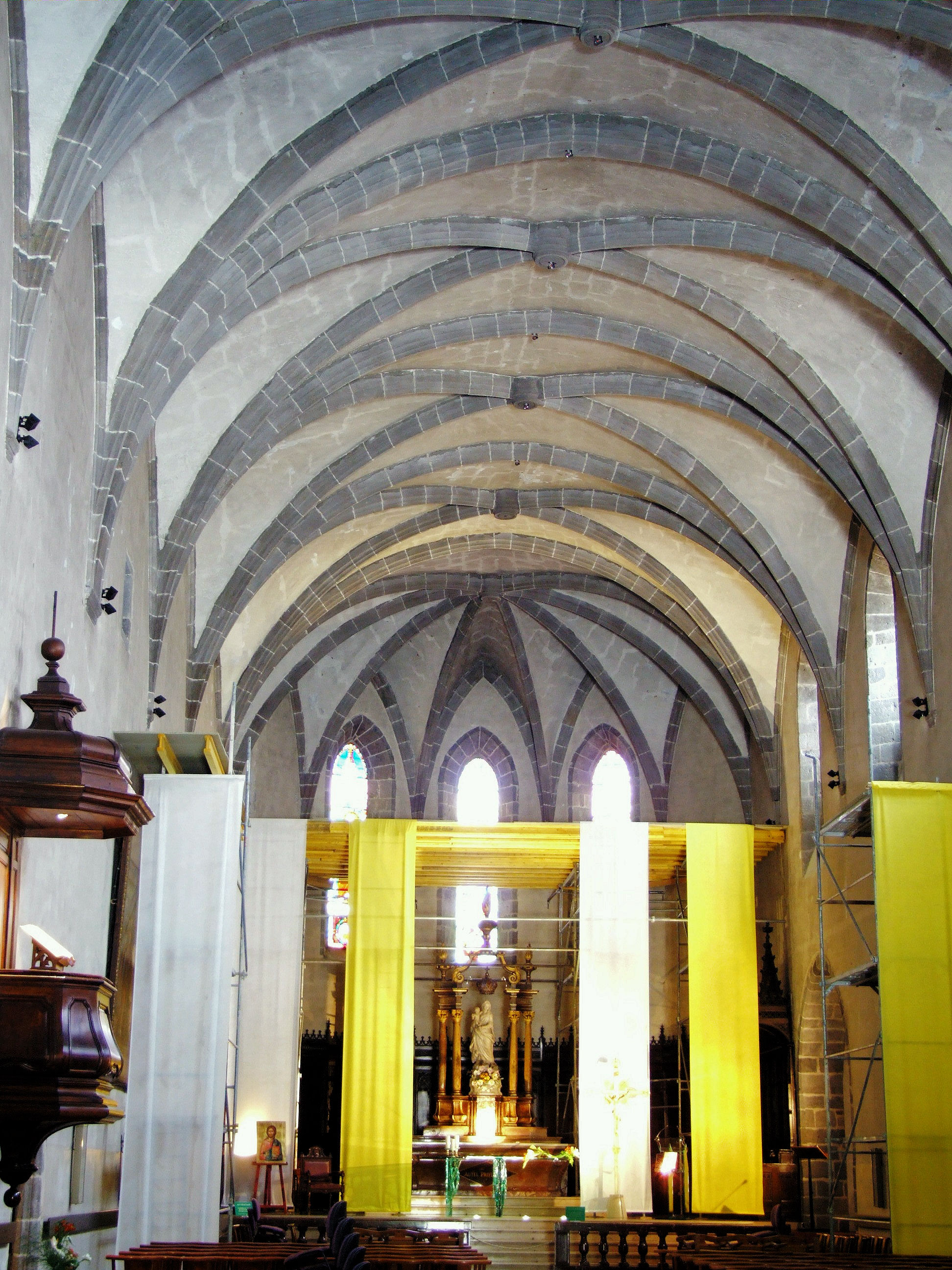
Nave of the Church of Notre-Dame-aux-Neiges

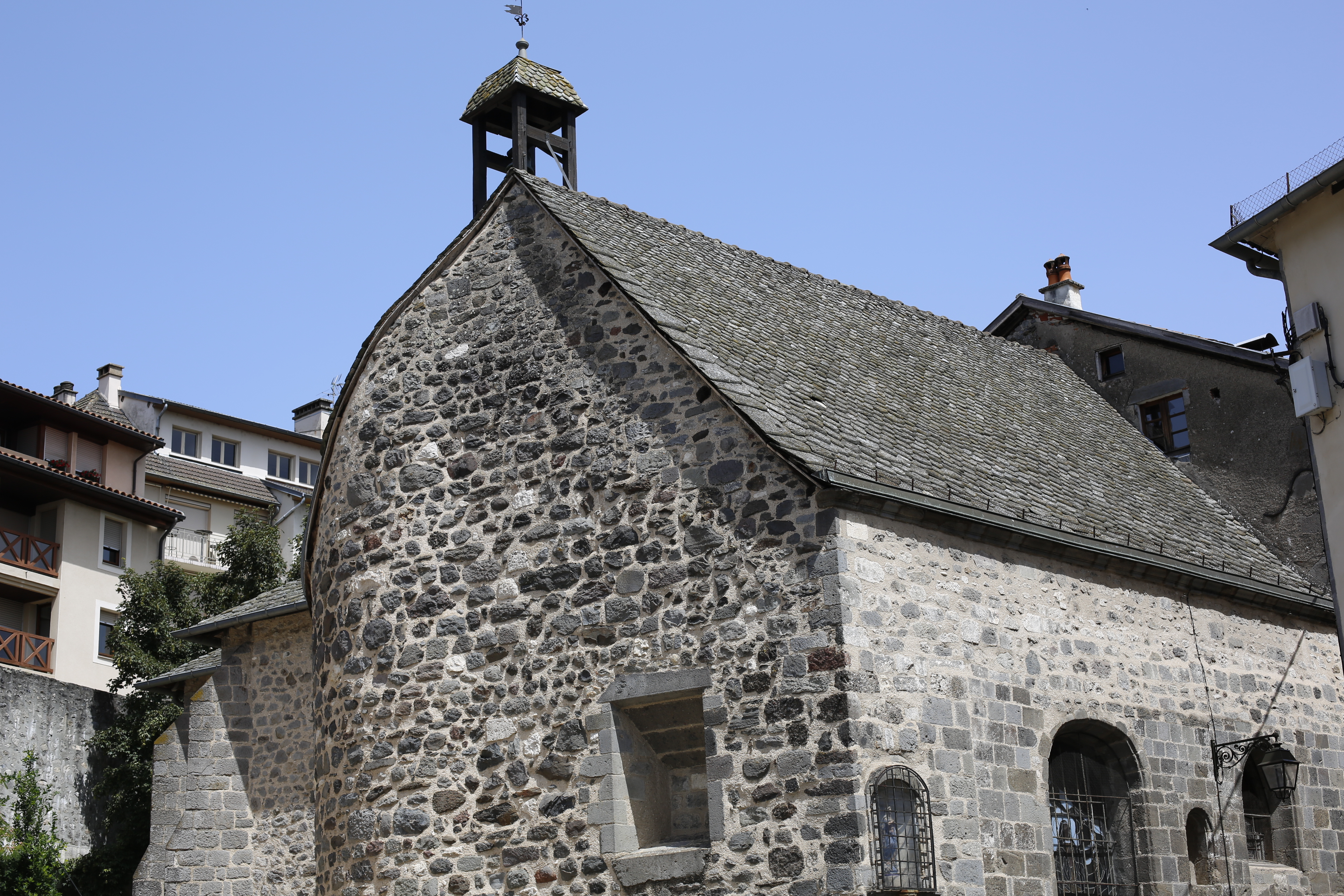
Chapel of Aurinques

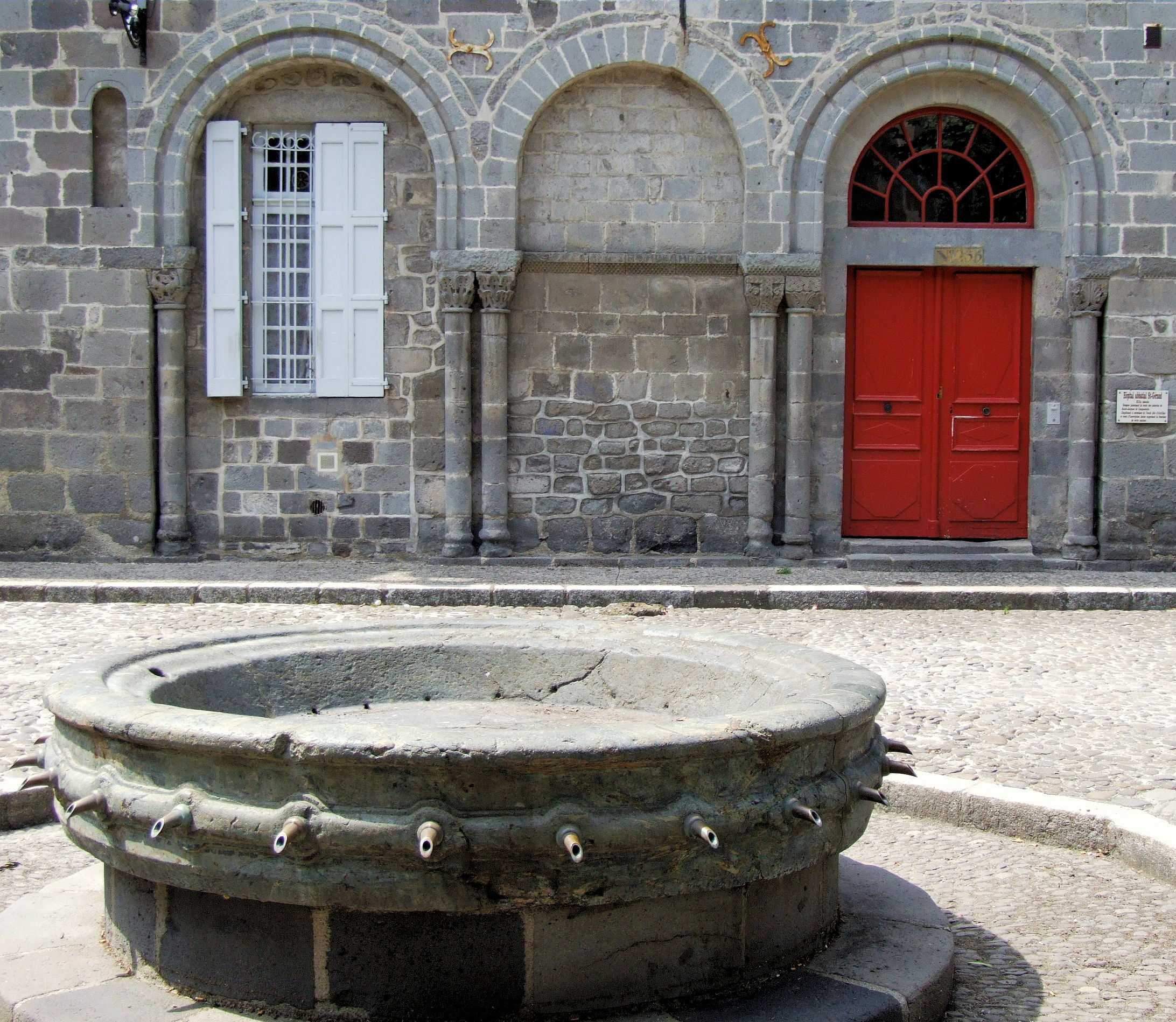
Old Abbey Hospital

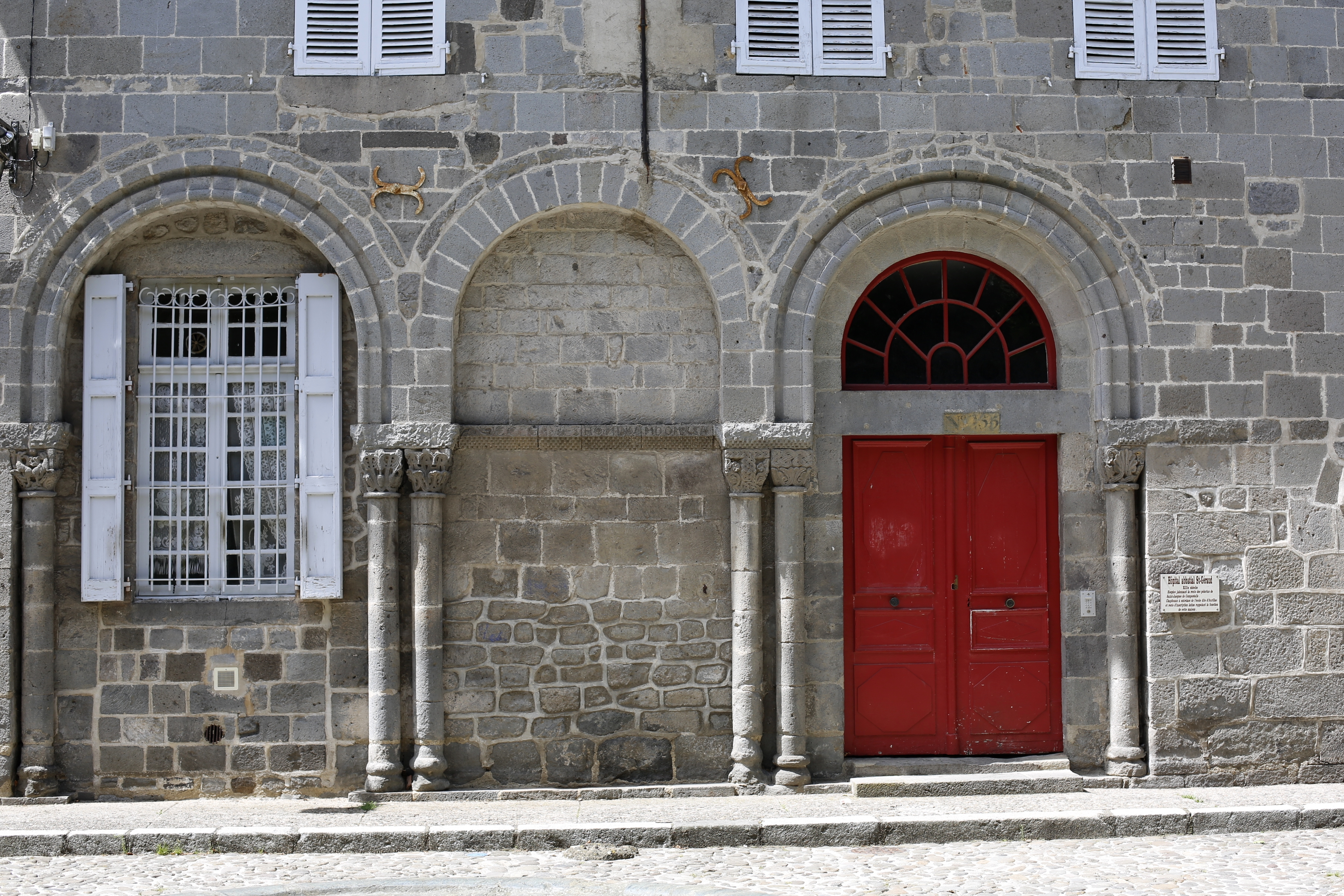
Old Abbey Hospital

== Facilities ==
=== Cultural facilities ===
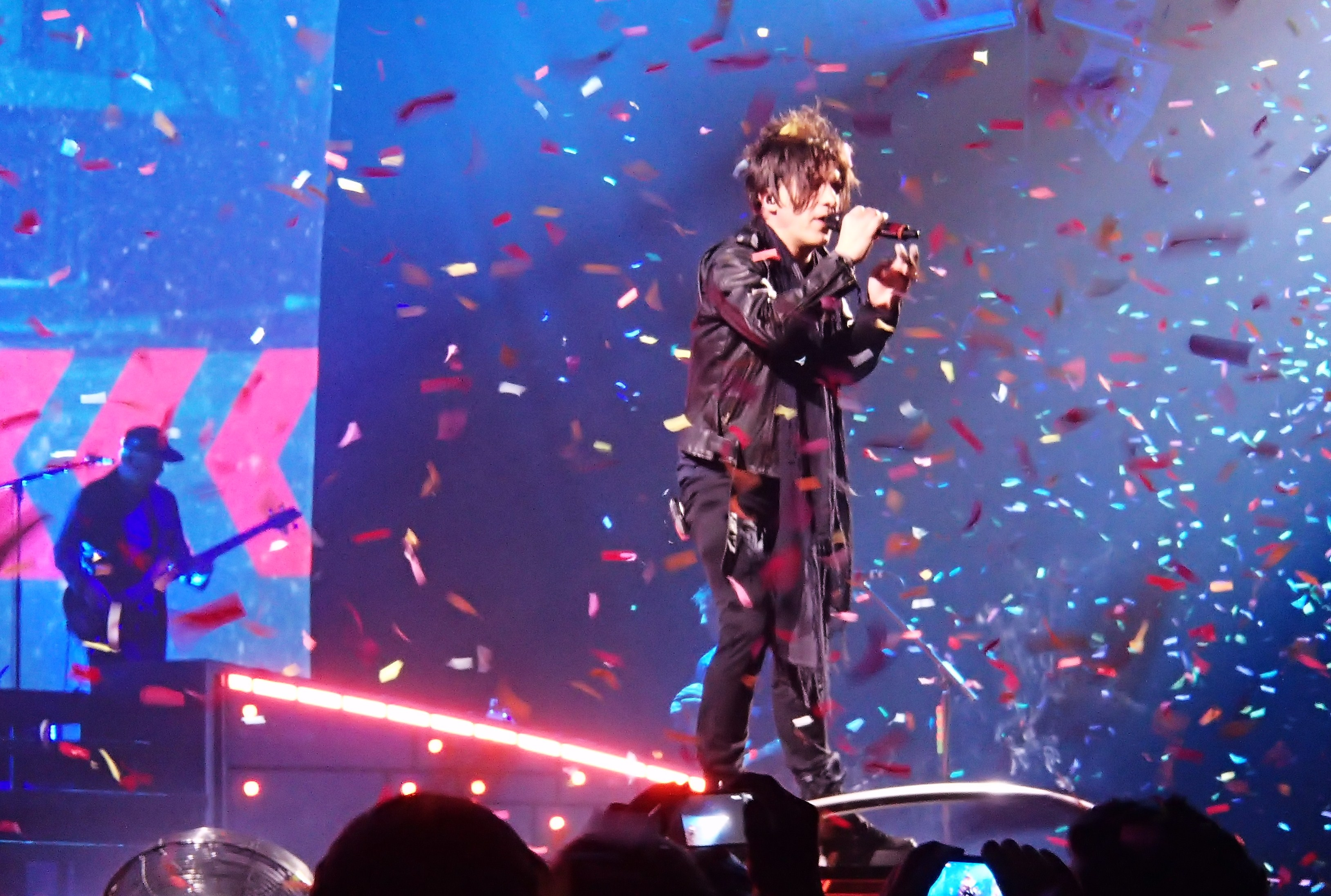
Concert at Le Prisme

Aurillac has several dance centres:

- Folk dancing: dancers and singers from the Auvergne School
- Conservatory: National School of Music and Dance of Aurillac
- Arabesque;
- Katy Bardy Dance School
- Modern jazz and classical Chorège Dance School;
- La Manufacture: a higher centre of dance, movement, and images created by Vendetta Mathea.
- Society of Upper Auvergne: a Society of letters, sciences and arts "La Haute-Auvergne"
- Theatre 4: rue de la Coste next to the Consul's House
- Le Prisme: conference rooms and entertainment

=== Cultural events and festivities ===
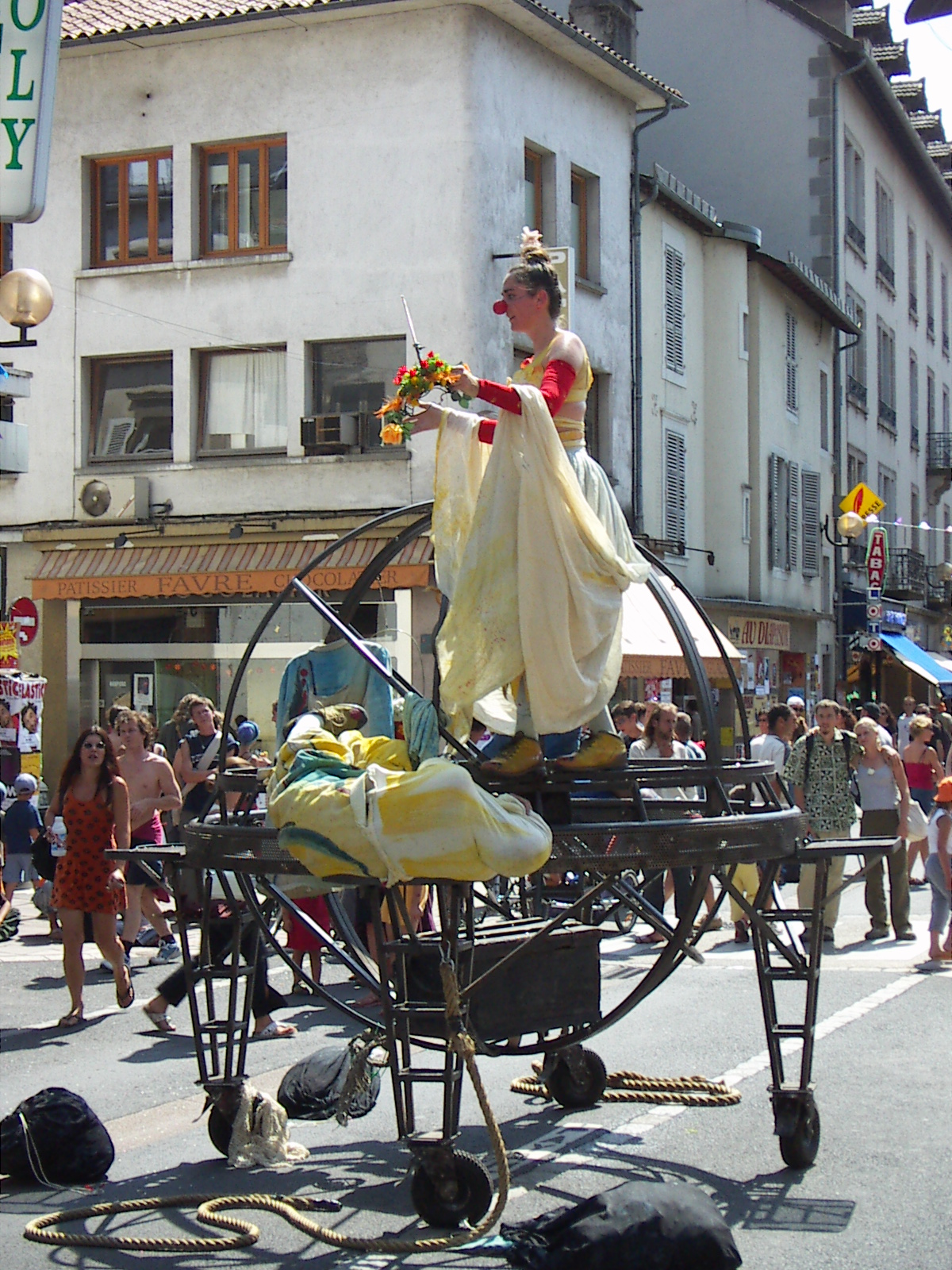
Festival of Street theatre at Aurillac

- The International festival of street theatre of Aurillac has been held every year since 1986 at the end of August for a period of four days. Since 2004 this festival has been preceded by "Les préalables" (Preliminaries) of variable duration (often starting in early August) with street performances throughout Cantal (and sometimes even in Corrèze) with the support of the association éclat. 2008 who inaugurated the first "University of Street Art".
- The European gourmet taste for three days in June is a gastronomic and cultural festival during which various prizes are awarded (Les Goudots gourmands) and where there are cooking classes with different themes each year (e.g. 2008: Slow Food) provided by prominent chefs.
- In 2007 there was the first edition of '36 Hours of Aurillac with Solos and small dance pieces.

=== Sports ===
Profile of the 10th stage of the Tour de France

- The Stade Aurillacois Cantal Auvergne: the Rugby Team had its 100th anniversary in 2004 and has played in Rugby Pro D2 since 2001, except for 2006-2007 where the "purgatory" in Fédérale 1 ended with the title of champion of France. Since the Second World War the club has always played either in the elite until 1986 (except 1949 and 1955) then later in group A, B, or Pro D2. Aurillac is rugby country as it is one of the few cities where there are more spectators at rugby matches than football matches. Matches take place at the Stade Jean Alric.
- The Athlétic Club Vélocipédique Aurillacois (Cycling Athletic Club): a cycling team founded in 1977 by Pierre Labro and led, since 1983, by André Valadou. In 2011 and 2012 it was the largest cycling club in Auvergne by number of members. In 2013 three riders from the club ranked at the highest level with Christophe Laborie among the professionals and François Bidard and Pierre Bonnet first in the amateur division. With a focus on training, the club sees at least one of its representatives each year wear Auvergne colours during a championship of France.
- The Aurillac FCA: a soccer team playing in CFA2 although the Aurillac reserve team plays in DH Auvergne and is Team C in the Regional Honour Division. Its training centre allows it to have 3 youth teams playing in the national championships (14 years, 16 years, and 18 years - the highest level for these categories).
- Aurillac Handball Cantal Auvergne: a professional Handball team who played in the first division for the 2008–2009 season for the first time in its history
- Basket club Aurillac Arpajon Géraldienne (BAAG): This is the Aurillac Basketball Club. Girls Team 1 plays at the highest regional level. This is the biggest club in the city in terms of members and results. There is also the Cantalienne Club.
- The Jean-Alric Stadium: the Municipal Stadium for the city of Aurillac and its rugby club - the Stade Aurillacois Cantal Auvergne. It owes its name to Jean Alric, a former player of the club, shot in Aurillac by the Germans during the Second World War.
- Volleyball Club (AVB): Aurillac has a volleyball club. The senior male and female teams play in Regional 1. The club has UFOLEP teams and youth teams. The club organises three tournaments open to everyone:
  - A tournament starting in September;
  - A night of volleyball in December (the largest in Auvergne);
  - A Summer tournament in June.

In 2011 Aurillac hosted the start of the Tour de France in the 10th stage.

=== Places of worship ===
- Saint Joseph Catholic Church
- Reformed Church of France, 10 rue des Frères-Delmas (Protestant)
- Evangelical Pentecostal Church - 6 Avenue des Pupilles de la Nation (ADD) (National Evangelical Council of France (CNEF))

=== Military ===
Two military units are garrisoned in Aurillac:

- the 139th Infantry Regiment, 1906
- the 2/16 Squadron of riot police which became the 33/5 in 1991 after the creation of legions of riot police then finally the 18/5 in 2011 after the dissolution of the GM group of Clermont-Ferrand.

Aurillac has long been a garrison town with the 139th Infantry Regiment, who are noted for their feats during the Battle of the Somme.

The military square is wide and airy and a feature of military architecture of the time. It is now known as the Zone of Peace and is now converted into a parking lot leaving a clear view of the 3 buildings that surround it. The entrance to the barracks was destroyed and replaced by a modern building. It houses administrative services, treasury, CABA, Mortgages, Cadastre etc. In the 1950s the old military buildings became the "Cité Administrative".

The clock building is called so because of the great clock that adorns this building. It is also commonly called the House of unions and associations. Originally these buildings were the former Convent of the Visitation, built in 1682. The Convent was converted into a barracks for infantry in 1792 and occupied half of the buildings until 1922, hence the transformation of buildings to equestrian use. Today the Pierre-Mendès-France Cultural Centre occupies the premises including the Museum of Art and Archaeology, the County Conservatory of Music and Dance, the youth service activities of the town of Aurillac, and a crèche for children. The Stables were then used by the national stud established by Napoleon in 1806; a depot of stallions was created in Aurillac. At the Battle of Austerlitz Napoleon rode Cantal, a speckled gray horse which is visible in a painting in the Art and Archaeology Museum. When the National Stud moved the stables were transformed into an exhibition hall / gallery and a range of exhibitions is held every year including the Salon des Métiers d'Art d'Aurillac.

== Notable people linked to the commune ==
Aurillac was the birthplace of

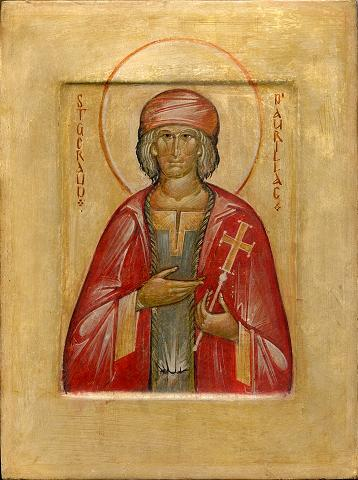
Saint Gerald of Aurillac

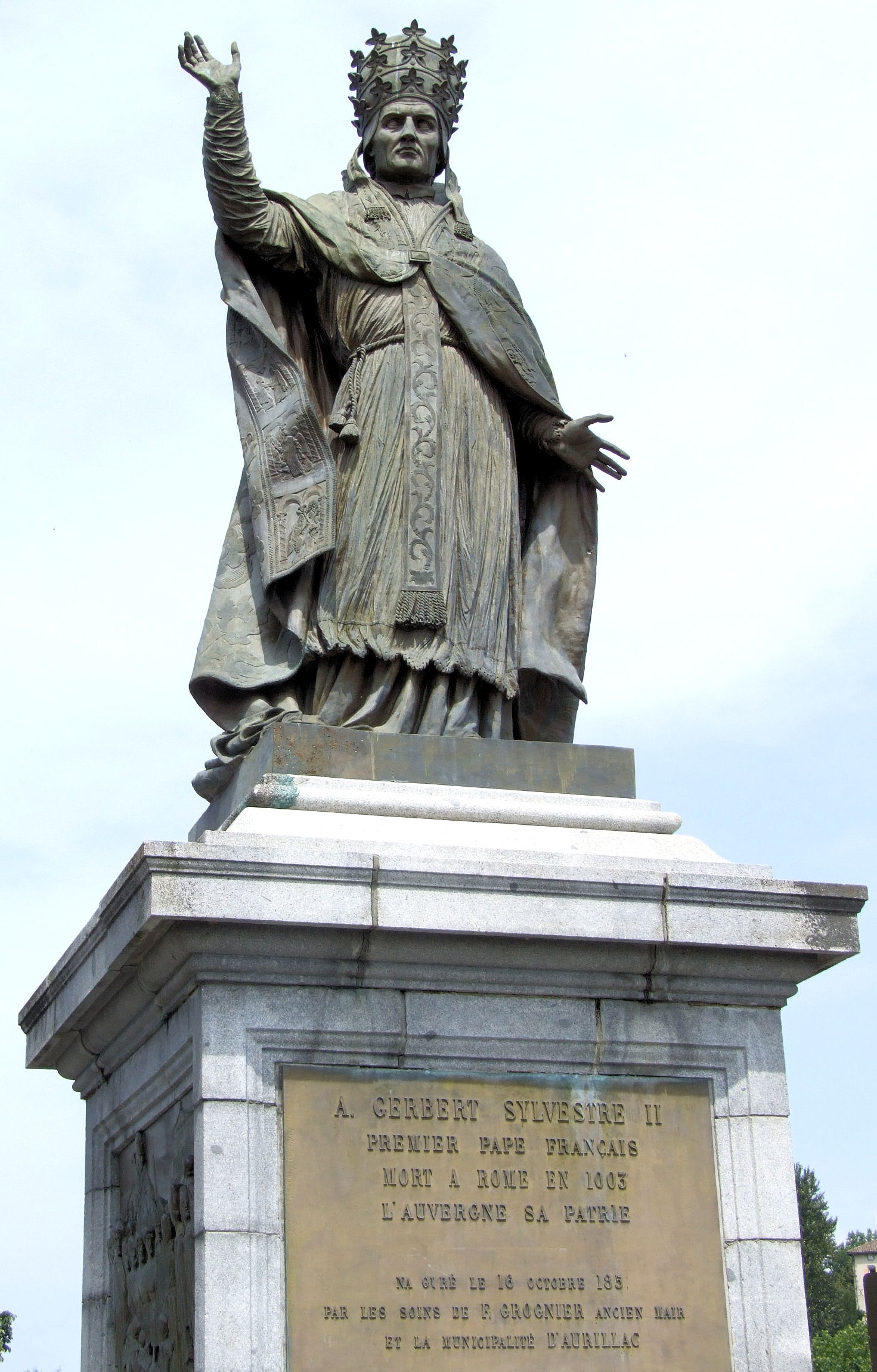
Statue of Pope Sylvester II (1851)

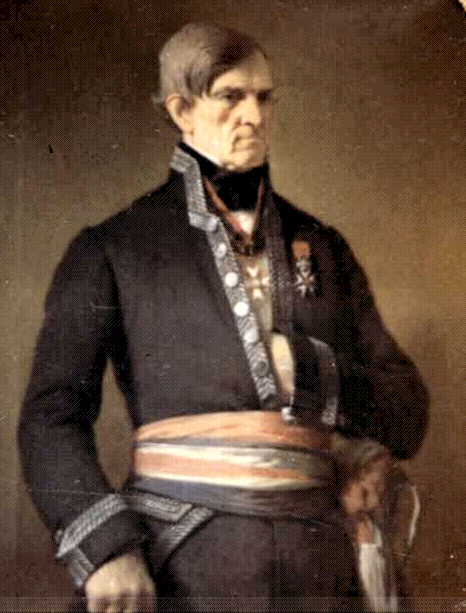
L-F Grognier

- Saint Gerald of Aurillac (855-909), politician.
- Gerbert of Aurillac (938-1003), Mathematician, tutor to Hugues Capet, Pope under the name Sylvester II.
- William of Auvergne (1190-1249), Theologian, Bishop of Paris, Chaplain and minister for Saint Louis.
- Jean Cinquarbres (1514-1587, Orientalist, Principal of Fortet College the Professor of Hebrew and Syriac at the Royal College.
- Jean-Aymar Piganiol de La Force (1673-1753), Geographer.
- Antoine Delzons (1743-1816), MP
- Jean-Baptiste Carrier (1756-1794), bloodthirsty republican revolutionary
- Édouard Jean-Baptiste Milhaud (1766-1833), cousin of Carrier, revolutionary, Commissioner of the Army, General of the Army of the Republic and the Empire, also known for his bloodthirsty actions
- Louis-Furcy Grognier (1773-1837), Director of the Veterinary school of Lyon
- Alexis Joseph Delzons (1775-1812), General of the Empire
- Charles Antoine Manhès (1777-1854), General of the Army of the Republic and the Empire
- Arsène Lacarrière-Latour (1778-1837), Engineer, architect, urban planner in Louisiana
- Eloy Chapsal (1811-1882), Painter and director of the Museum of Aurillac.
- Claude Sosthène Grasset d'Orcet (1828-1900), Archaeologist, historian
- Jean-Baptiste Rames (1832–1894), Geologist
- Émile Duclaux (1840-1904), Physician, Chemist and biologist
- Jules Rengade (1841-1915), Doctor, médecin, novelist for children, scientific journalist
- Francis Charmes (1849-1916), Journalist, Academic
- Géraud Réveilhac (1851-1937), General
- Paul Doumer (1857-1932), President of the Third Republic
- Jean de Bonnefon (1866-1928), Journalist, polygrapher
- Pierre de Vaissière (1867-1942), paleographic archivist, historian
- Marie Marvingt (1875–1963), an athlete, mountaineer, Pioneer medical evacuation pilot, and the most decorated woman in the history of France.
- Georges Monnet (1898-1980), agronomist, politician
- Elie Calvet (1904-1929), Comedian, 1st Prize in Comedy from the Conservatory, died on stage receiving his award, nephew of the famous singer Rosa Emma Calvé (1858-1942)
- Jacques Maziol (1918-1990), Minister of Construction under de Gaulle, President-director general of Radio Monte-Carlo
- Bernard Tricot (1920-2000), Secretary-General of the Élysée from 1967 to 1969, one of the negotiators of the Évian Accords with the Algerian FLN to abandon French Algeria
- Alain Delcamp (1946-), Secretary-General for the Senate
- Jean-Benoît Puech (1947-), writer, author of La Bibliothèque d'un amateur (1980), Louis-René des Forêts, novel (2000), Une biographie autorisée (2010)
- Roland Chassain (1947-2021), MP for Bouches-du-Rhône
- Jean-Yves Hugon (1949-), former MP for Indre
- Marc Mézard (1957-), theoretical physicist, director of the École normale supérieure (Paris)
- Catherine Amalric (1964-), MEP
- David Nègre (1973-), former professional footballer
- Olivier Magne (1973-), international rugby player
- Sébastien Pissavy (1973-), founder of the jeuxvideo.com website
- Jean-Philippe Sol (1986-), international volley-ball player
- Léo Pons (1996-), filmmaker

Linked to Aurillac

- François Maynard (Toulouse 1582-Aurillac 1646), poet, one of the first members of the Académie française.
- Abel Beaufrère
- Alfred Durand (-1947), professor of geography at the Aurillac school, author of La vie rurale dans les massifs volcaniques des Dores, du Cézallier, du Cantal et de l'Aubrac, thesis, 1946, Clermont-Ferrand, 530 p. (reprint Créér), Aurillac, géographie urbaine, 1948, 254 pp.
- Marcel Grosdidier de Matons (1885-1945), professor of geography at the Aurillac school, author of Études de géographie urbaine (RHA), La Chataigneraie cantalienne
- Maxime Real del Sarte and Jean de Barrau did their military service at Aurillac
- Pierre Wirth (1921-2003), Professor at Aurillac school, author of Aurillac, 1973, Voyage à travers la Haute-Auvergne, 1973, Le Guide du Cantal, 1994
- Joseph Malègue (1876-1940), Much of his novel of 900 pages, Augustin ou le Maître est là, takes place mainly in Aurillac: Under the table of Augustin is life in a prefecture of the province, which is actually Aurillac.

== See also ==
- Communes of the Cantal department

== Bibliography ==
- Alfred Durand, Aurillac, Urban Geography, 1948, 254 pp. (in French)
