= Ytrac =

Commune in Auvergne-Rhône-Alpes, France

- Commune
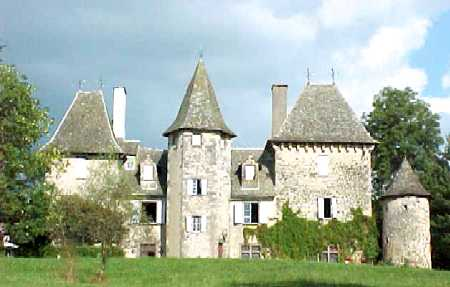
- Château Lamartinie
- Location of Ytrac
- Location within France Location within Auvergne-Rhône-Alpes
- Coordinates: 44°54′46″N 2°21′48″E
- Country: France
- Region: Auvergne-Rhône-Alpes
- Department: Cantal
- Arrondissement: Aurillac
- Canton: Aurillac-1
- Intercommunality: CA Aurillac Agglomération

Government
  - Mayor (2020–2026): Bernadette Ginez
- Area^{1}: 38.37 km^{2} (14.81 sq mi)
- Elevation: 591 m (1,939 ft)
- Highest elevation: 665 m (2,182 ft)
- Lowest elevation: 517 m (1,696 ft)
- Population (2023): 4,339
  - Density: 113.1/km^{2} (292.9/sq mi)
- Time zone: UTC+01:00 (CET)
  - Summer (DST): UTC+02:00 (CEST)
- INSEE/Postal code: 15267 /15130
- ^{1} French Land Register data, which excludes lakes, ponds, glaciers > 1 km^{2} (0.386 sq mi or 247 acres) and river estuaries.

Ytrac (French pronunciation: [itʁak]; Occitan: Aitrac) is a commune in the Cantal department in south-central France.

== Geography ==
Ytrac is a commune within the functional area of Aurillac, located just west of the city. It is situated in the Massif Central, to the southwest of the Cantal mountains.

Its neighboring communes are Arpajon-sur-Cère, Aurillac, Crandelles, Lacapelle-Viescamp, Naucelles, Roannes-Saint-Mary, Saint-Mamet-la-Salvetat, Saint-Paul-des-Landes and Sansac-de-Marmiesse.

== Population ==
Historical population
Year	Pop.	±% p.a.
1968	1,237	—
1975	1,643	+4.14%
1982	2,673	+7.20%
1990	3,367	+2.93%
1999	3,330	−0.12%
2007	3,778	+1.59%
2012	3,986	+1.08%
2017	4,293	+1.50%
2023	4,339	+0.18%
Source: INSEE

== See also ==
- Communes of the Cantal department
