= Chapsal =

Chapsal is a surname. Notable people with the surname include:

- Charles Pierre Chapsal, French grammarian
- Eloy Chapsal, French painter and museum director
- Fernand Chapsal, French lawyer, administrator, and politician
- Madeleine Chapsal, French writer
