= Léo Pons =

French filmmaker (born 1996)

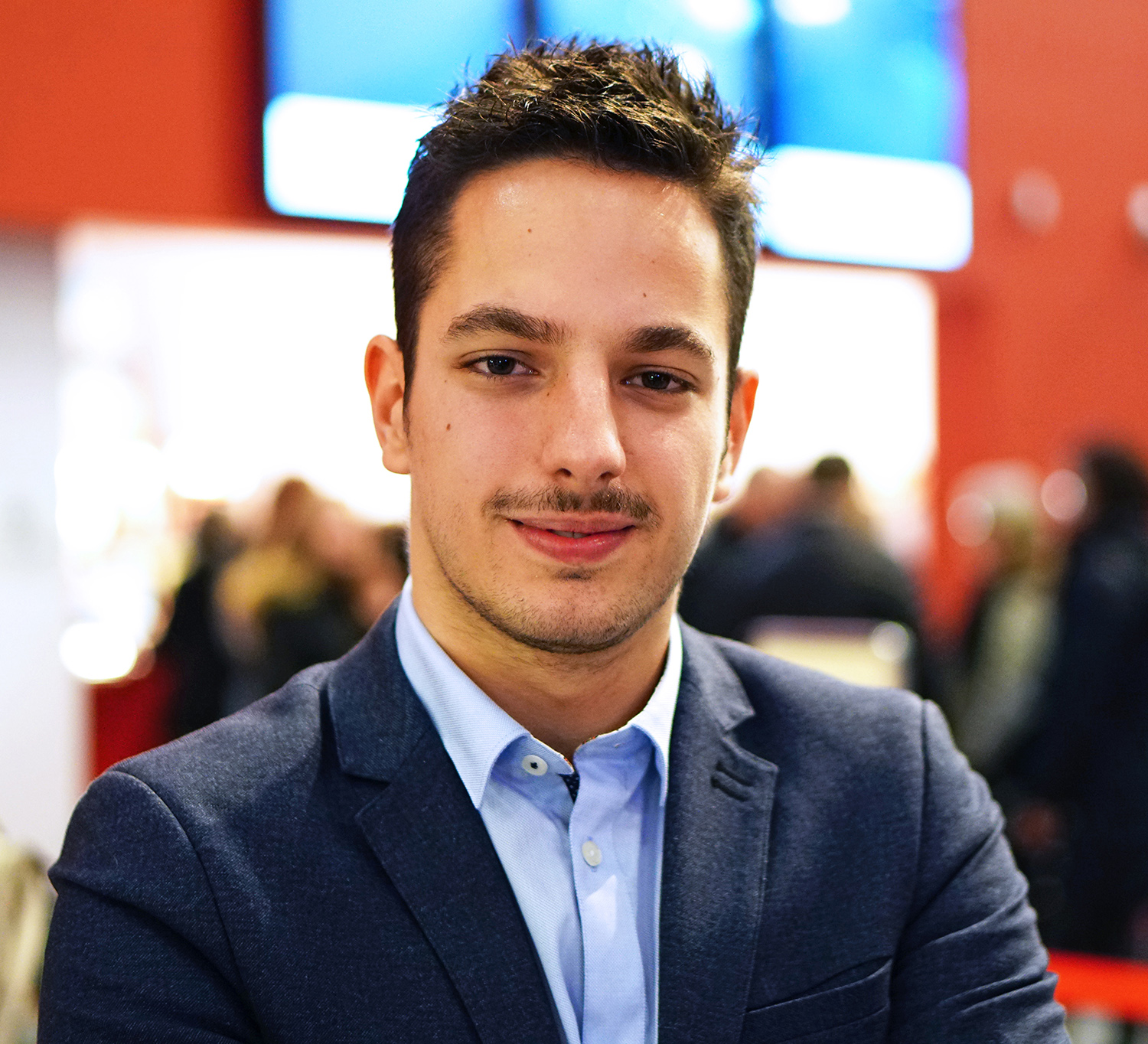
- Pons in 2016.
- Born: 4 October 1996 (age 29); Aurillac, France
- Occupation: Filmmaker
- Years active: 2014–present

Léo Pons (born 4 October 1996) is a French filmmaker. He is best known for directing Le Hobbit: Le Retour du roi du Cantal.

== Biography ==
He is widely recognized for directing films that showcase the Cantal region, such as "The Hobbit: The Return of the King of Cantal," a parody feature film based on J. R. R. Tolkien's novels and Peter Jackson's films, and "Le Buron," a 23-minute thriller filmed in Cantal that intertwines local legends and history or Le Buron, a 23-minute thriller shot in Cantal blending local legends and history. It earned him various awards at the Los Angeles Film Festival.

== Filmography ==
=== Film ===
- 2014: Le Hobbit: Les Origines du Cantal
- 2014: Cantal, what else?
- 2015: Le Hobbit: Le retour du roi du Cantal
- 2016: Smiling in Aurillac
- 2016: "CHUT!"
