= Louis-Furcy Grognier =

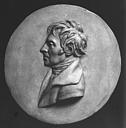
Commemorative medal

Louis-Furcy Grognier (20 April 1773 – 7 October 1837) was a French veterinarian, naturalist, and writer. He served as a professor and director at the veterinary school of Lyon (l'École vétérinaire de Lyon).

== Life and work ==
Grognier was born in Aurillac the son of bailiff Antoine and Françoise née Bruel. His grandfather Furcy (d. 1775) was his godfather. Two of his brothers were also named Louis-Furcy, one born in 1783 became a sculptor and died in 1817 while trying to save a drowning child while another was born in 1777 (died 1832). A cousin who was also named Louis Furcy (1787-1863) served as mayor of Aurillac and was the son of another bailiff named Antoine. This has led to considerable confusion of dates in biographies. Grognier studied at Aurillac and although initially to take up a religious training due to his maternal uncle Abbe Bruel, the plan was altered by the French revolution. He then studied hydrography in Bordeaux but left due to financial troubles and stayed with his uncle in Lyon and in 1792 he joined the École vétérinaire there which was under the direction of Louis Bredin. He was politically active and took part in the siege of Lyon. He was imprisoned and briefly stayed with a false identity claiming to be the son of servant before he was recognized and released by a marshal. He was then posted into the army and served in the Vendée campaign. In 1795 he registered again at the veterinary school and completed. He then considered studies in medicine but with support from Louis Bredin, he chose to work as a librarian at the veterinary school from 1797. He became a professor later and taught until 1825. In 1825 he became chair of zoology, hygiene, animal husbandry and veterinary jurisprudence. He wrote extensively on horses and about local cattle breeds.

Grognier was a member of the Athenaeum from its establishment in 1800 and presided over it in 1820. He was a member of several academies in France as well as outside. He was deputy secretary to the Société d'agriculture from 1812, a founding member of the Cercle littéraire (from 1807) and the Société de médecine. Grognier married Agathe Lenoir (1777-1853) in 1813 and they had six children.
