= Hôtel de Ville, Aurillac =

Town hall in Aurillac, France

Hôtel de Ville
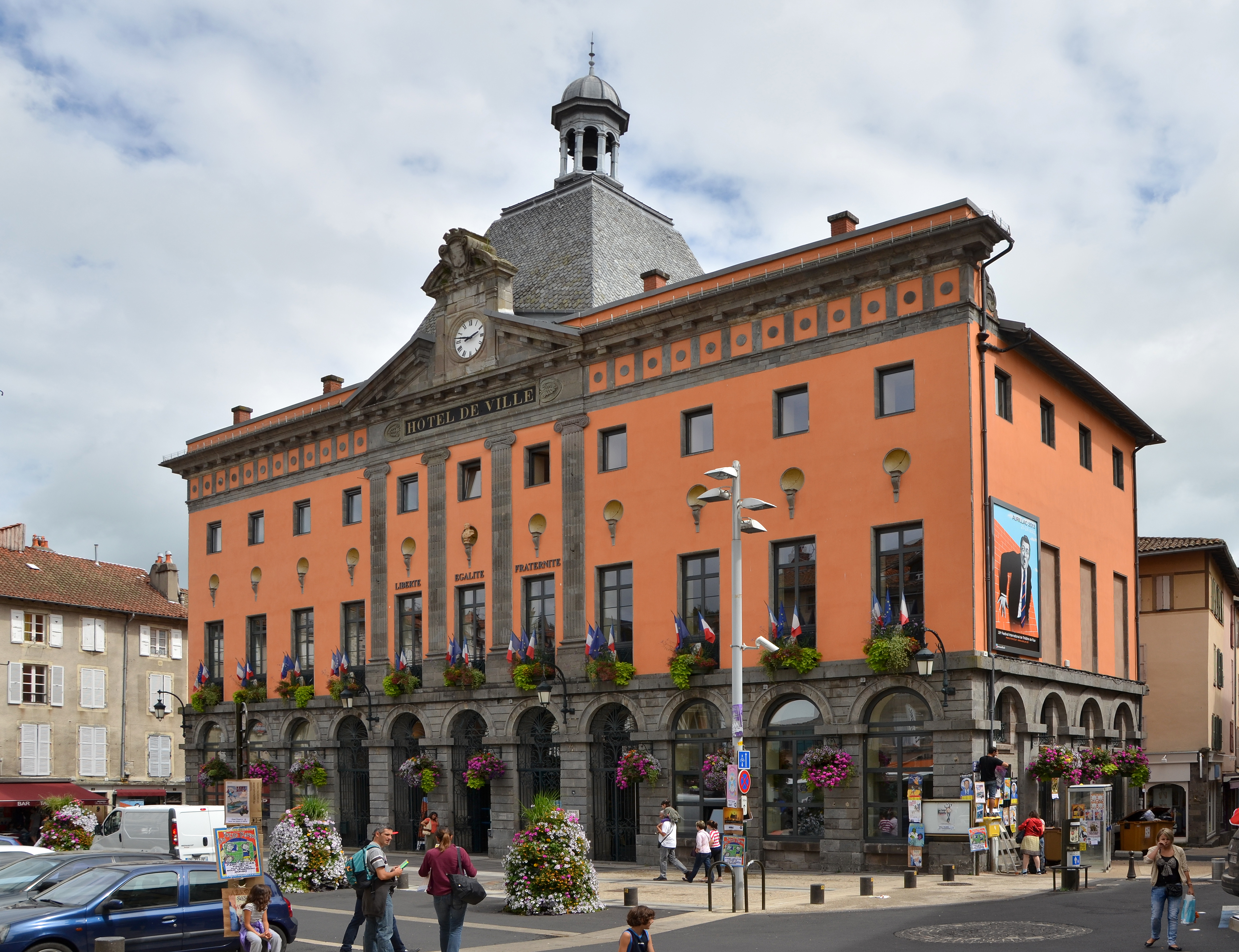
- The main frontage of the Hôtel de Ville in August 2013
- Interactive map of the Hôtel de Ville area

General information
- Type: City hall
- Architectural style: Empire style
- Location: Aurillac, France
- Coordinates: 44.9300°N 2.4455°E
- Completed: 1806

Design and construction
- Architect: Sieur Lallier

The Hôtel de Ville (French pronunciation: [otɛl də vil], City Hall) is a municipal building in Aurillac, Cantal, in central France, standing on Place de l'Hôtel-de-Ville.

== History ==
Following the French Revolution, the town council initially met in a local college before establishing an office at Maison Broha (later known as Maison Souquière) at No. 19, Place de l'Hôtel-de-Ville. After finding this arrangement unsatisfactory, the council led by the mayor, Jean Abadie, decided to commission a dedicated building. The site they selected was occupied by the Church of Notre-Dame which was duly demolished. The new building was commissioned by a private citizen, Sieur Dupuy, so minimising the amount of detail requiring approval under the regulations at the time. Nevertheless, there was strong local criticism of the large size and massing of the proposed structure. Construction of the new building started in 1803. It was designed by Sieur Lallier in the Empire style, built in ashlar stone and was completed in 1806.

The design involved a symmetrical main frontage of 11 bays facing onto Place de l'Hôtel-de-Ville. The ground floor was rusticated and featured a series of round headed opening with voussoirs. The first floor was fenestrated by tall casement windows while the second floor was fenestrated by square casement windows. There were a series of niches above the first-floor windows: these held busts of which only a bust of Napoleon, in the central niche, survives. On the upper floors, the three central bays were flanked by Ionic order pilasters supporting a entablature, which was decorated by a series of medallions, and an open modillioned pediment containing a clock.

A plaque was installed on the wall of the town hall to commemorate the life of Marshal Michel Ney who, after being defeated at the Battle of Waterloo, stayed in a room in the town hall from 3 August 1815 to 15 August 1815, during the Second White Terror, before being taken away by the supporters of the new regime under Louis XVIII and executed for treason.

The building was enhanced by a dome, which was surmounted by a campanile, in the late 19th century. Works of art installed in the building included a portrait by Jean Eloy Chapsal of Louis de Laparra de Fieux, who was an advisor to Louis XIV.

In the mid-1970s, following significant population growth, the council decided to commission the bureaux municipaux (municipal offices) on Rue de la Coste, some 200 metres (660 ft) to the north of the town hall. The new building was designed in the modern style, built in concrete and glass and completed in September 1978. It incorporated an ornate doorway which had formed part of the Hôtel de Malras which had previously occupied that site and had been completed in the 17th century.
