= Eloy Chapsal =

French painter

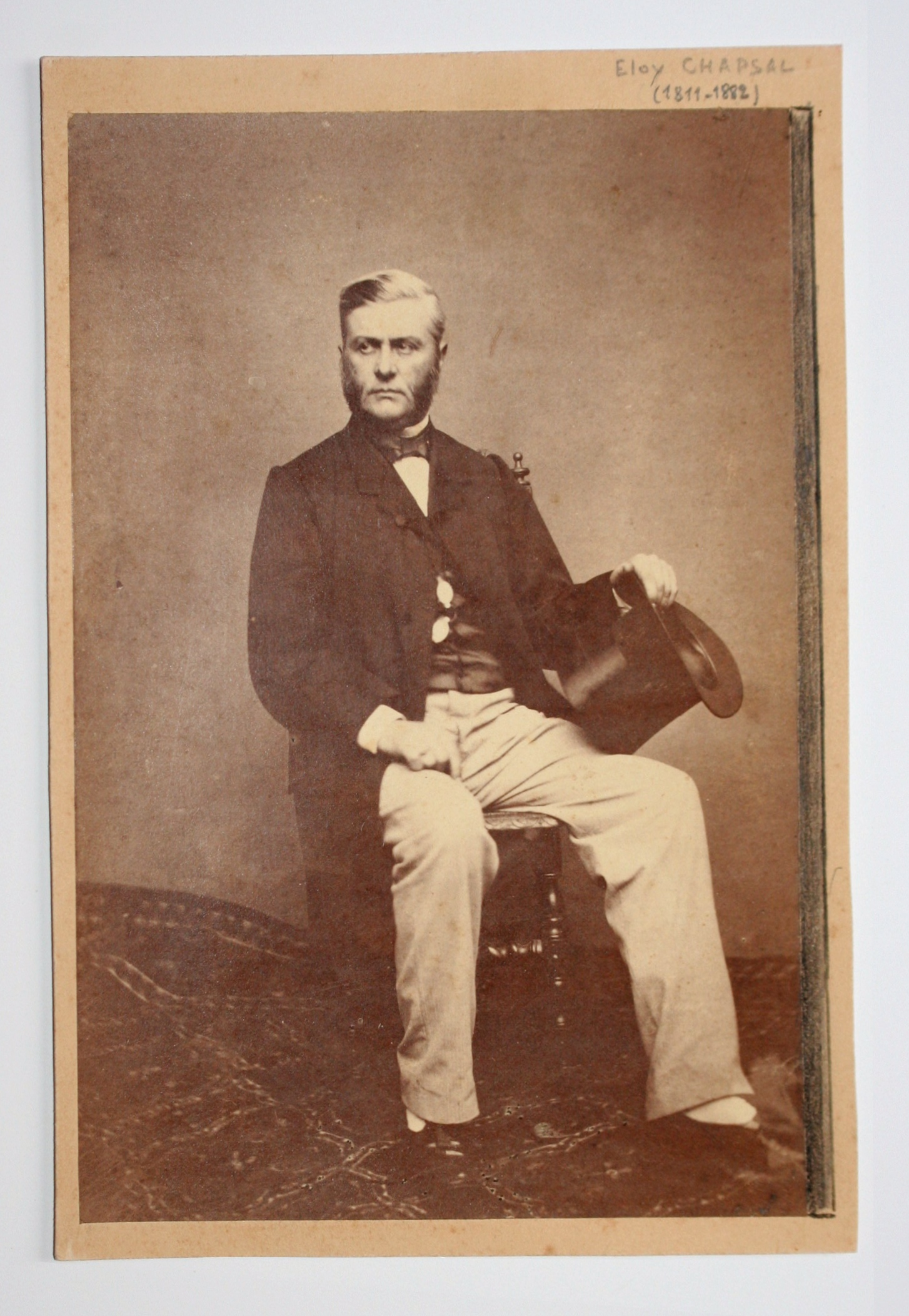
Eloy Chapsal (1852)

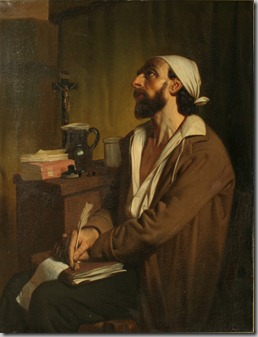
The Dying Poet

Jean-Eloy Chapsal (25 June 1811, Aurillac – 20 July 1882, Aurillac) was a French Romantic painter and museum Director.

== Biography ==
His father was a coppersmith. He displayed artistic talent at an early age and went to Paris to begin his studies at the École des Beaux-arts in 1830. At various times, he worked with Antoine-Jean Gros, Merry-Joseph Blondel and David d'Angers. After several unsuccessful attempts to win the Prix de Rome, he left school.

For several years, he was a regular participant in the Salon and received good critical notices. Despite this he returned to his hometown and got married. Once established there, he produced works in a variety of genres, religious and secular, including over 200 portraits. Among his notable patrons was the Delzons family; descendants of Alexis Joseph Delzons, one of Napoleon's generals.

After 1845, he began to suffer from gout. As his condition worsened, he gradually gave up painting. He did not, however, become completely inactive. In 1853, he was named the first Director of the "Museum of Art and Archaeology of Aurillac"; a position he held until his death.

At present, only an estimated 10% of his known works have been accounted for; consisting largely of landscapes, genre scenes and portraits of prominent local people; nobility, bourgeoisie and politicians. Most of his identified works are in the Museum. Some are in private collections, and it is believed that is where the bulk of his unfound ones are located.

A street in Aurillac has been named after him. A major retrospective of his works was held at the museum in Aurillac in 2012.

== Sources ==
- Oriane Hébert, Eloy Chapsal (1811-1882). Portraits d’Aurillac au XIXe siècle, Cantal Patrimoine, 2011
