= Jean de Bonnefon =

French journalist (1867–1928)

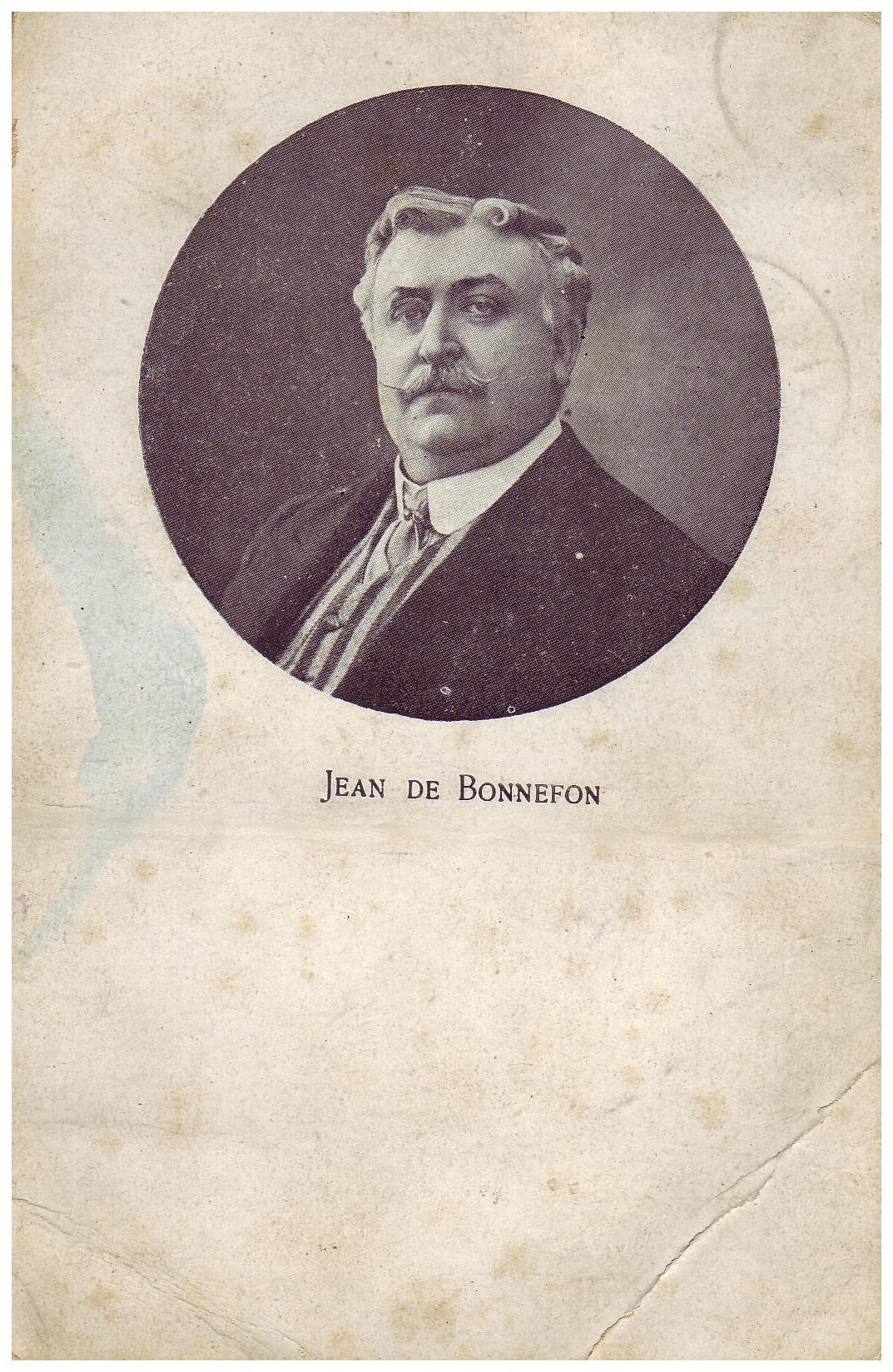
- Born: Marie, François, Joseph, Jean de Bonnefon; March 22, 1867; Calvinet, Cantal, France
- Died: March 30, 1928 (aged 61); Calvinet, Cantal, France
- Occupation: Journalist
- Parent(s): Charles de Bonnefon; Marie Valentin

Jean de Bonnefon (1867 – 1928) was a French journalist and Catholic author.

== Early life ==
Jean de Bonnefon was born on March 22, 1867, in Calvinet, Cantal. His father, born Charles Bonnefon, changed his patronymic surname to Charles de Bonnefon in 1855; the nobiliary particle had been dropped by the family during the French Revolution. His mother was Marie Valentin.

== Career ==
Bonnefon was a journalist and Catholic author. He was a member of the Société des gens de lettres. His amanuensis, Robert Desnos, became a renowned Surrealist poet.

Bonnefon co-authored a book with architect Georges Wybo.

A self-declared modernist and anti-clerical Catholic, Bonnefon was instrumental in the passing of the 1905 French law on the Separation of the Churches and the State.

=== Lourdes controversy ===
Bonnefon was the subject of controversy for the publication in 1906 of a pamphlet (Lourdes et ses tenanciers), where he attacked the Lourdes apparitions as false. In it, Bonnefon claimed to have retrieved a letter, dated 28 December 1857, which allegedly proved that local authorities were aware that a false religious apparition was being prepared due to political reasons. The letter, which is not present in the Archives Nationales and whose original was never found (Bonnefon claimed to have received a copy of it from an anonymous "intermediary") has been deemed a forgery by several authors such as René Laurentin and Georges Bertrin, who point out how its content is contradicted by several certified documents of the time and how the language in it is contrary to the administrative uses of the Second French Empire.

== Death ==
Bonnefon died on March 30, 1928, in his hometown of Calvinet.

== Works ==
- Bonnefon, Jean de (1888). Drame impérial : ce que l'on ne peut pas dire à Berlin. Paris: E. Dentu. OCLC 2038509.
- Bonnefon, Jean de (1889). Le Pape de demain. Paris: E. Dentu. OCLC 252913113.
- Bonnefon, Jean de (1891). La politique d'un saint : VIIIe Centenaire de Saint Bernard. Paris: E. Dentu. OCLC 28246555.
- Bonnefon, Jean de (1905). Lourdes et ses tenanciers. Paris: Louis Michaud. OCLC 10565393.
- Bonnefon, Jean de (1908). Le baron de Richemont, fils de Louis XVI : nombreux portraits et documents. Paris: Louis Michaud. OCLC 5340605.
- Bonnefon, Jean de (1909). La corbeille des roses, ou, Les dames de lettres : essais. Paris: Société d'éditions de Bouville. OCLC 9618312.
- Bonnefon, Jean de (1910). Pierre de Ronsard : gentilhomme du Danube, aumonier du roi, poète de France. Paris: Société d'éditions. OCLC 221205503.
- Bonnefon, Jean de; Wybo, Georges (1912). Les maisons des champs au pays de France. Paris: Société d'éditions. OCLC 39763970.
- Bonnefon, Jean de (1915). Les cathédrales de France devant les barbares. Paris: Société d'éditions. OCLC 742329117.
