= Canton of Aurillac-2 =

Coordinates: 44.93°N 2.45°E

- Canton
- Situation of the canton of Aurillac-2 in the department of Cantal
- Country: France
- Region: Auvergne-Rhône-Alpes
- Department: Cantal
- No. of communes: {{{nbcomm}}}
- Population (2023): 9,902
- INSEE code: 1503

The canton of Aurillac-2 is an administrative division of the Cantal department, southern France. Its borders were modified at the French canton reorganisation which came into effect in March 2015. Its seat is in Aurillac.

It consists of the following communes:

1. Aurillac (partly)
