= Naucelles =

Commune in Auvergne-Rhône-Alpes, France

- Commune
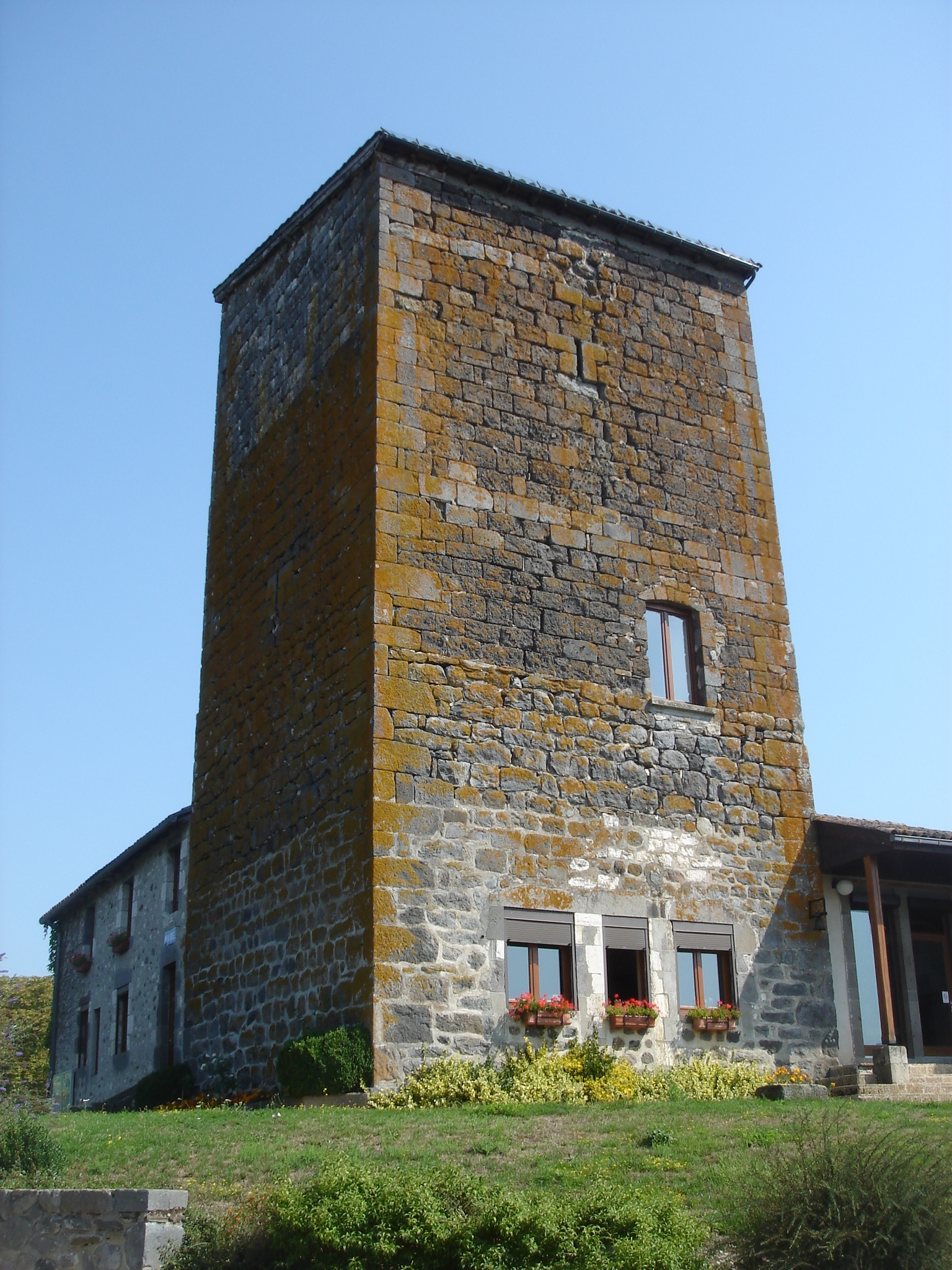
- The Tower of Naucelles
- Location of Naucelles
- Location within France Location within Auvergne-Rhône-Alpes
- Coordinates: 44°57′35″N 2°25′11″E
- Country: France
- Region: Auvergne-Rhône-Alpes
- Department: Cantal
- Arrondissement: Aurillac
- Canton: Naucelles
- Intercommunality: CA Aurillac Agglomération

Government
  - Mayor (2020–2026): Christian Poulhes
- Area^{1}: 11.69 km^{2} (4.51 sq mi)
- Elevation: 636 m (2,087 ft)
- Highest elevation: 842 m (2,762 ft)
- Lowest elevation: 579 m (1,900 ft)
- Population (2023): 2,181
  - Density: 186.6/km^{2} (483.2/sq mi)
- Time zone: UTC+01:00 (CET)
  - Summer (DST): UTC+02:00 (CEST)
- INSEE/Postal code: 15140 /15250
- ^{1} French Land Register data, which excludes lakes, ponds, glaciers > 1 km^{2} (0.386 sq mi or 247 acres) and river estuaries.

Naucelles (French pronunciation: [nosɛl]; Occitan: Naucèla) is a commune in the Cantal department in south-central France.

== Population ==
Historical population
Year	Pop.	±% p.a.
1968	709	—
1975	1,096	+6.42%
1982	1,211	+1.44%
1990	1,651	+3.95%
1999	1,782	+0.85%
2007	1,925	+0.97%
2012	1,922	−0.03%
2017	2,024	+1.04%
2023	2,181	+1.25%
Source: INSEE

== See also ==
- Communes of the Cantal department
