= Ceres =

Ceres most commonly refers to:

- Ceres (dwarf planet), the largest asteroid and first to be discovered
- Ceres (mythology), the Roman goddess of agriculture

Ceres may also refer to:

== Places ==
=== Australia ===
- Ceres, Victoria, Australia
- CERES Community Environment Park (Centre for Education and Research in Environmental Strategies), a community environmental park in Melbourne, Victoria, Australia

=== Brazil ===
- Ceres, Goiás, Brazil
- Ceres Microregion, in north-central Goiás state, Brazil

=== South Africa ===
- Ceres, South Africa, in Western Cape
- Ga-Ngwetsana, also known as Ceres, Limpopo, South Africa
- Ceres Koekedouw Dam, dam on the Koekedouw River, near Ceres, Western Cape, South Africa

=== United States ===
- Ceres, California
- Ceres, Iowa
- Ceres, New York, a community that also extends into Pennsylvania
- Ceres, Oklahoma, a community in Noble County
- Ceres, Virginia
- Ceres, West Virginia
- Ceres Township, McKean County, Pennsylvania

=== Other countries ===
- Ceres, Santa Fe, Argentina
- Ceres, Piedmont, Italy
- Ceres, Fife, Scotland, UK
- Ceres Nunataks, Antarctica
- CERES Ile du Levant, short for Centre d'Essais et de Recherches d'Engins Spéciaux, a rocket launch and missile test site at Ile du Levant island, France

== Aircraft, rocket, transport, and vessels ==
=== Aircraft, locomotive, car ===
- CAC Ceres, a crop-duster aircraft manufactured in Australia
- Ceres, a West Cornwall Railway steam locomotive
- Toyota Corolla Ceres a compact, 4-door hardtop sold in Japan
- Kia Ceres, a version of the Kia Bongo, a 2-door pick up truck
- Ceres Liner, A transportation brand based in Bacolod.

=== Ships and submarines ===
- Ceres (East Indiaman), three vessels of the British East India Company
- Ceres (ship), several ships
- HMS Ceres, three ships and three shore establishments of the British Royal Navy
- French ship Céres, several ships of the French Navy
- USS Ceres (1856), a Union Navy steamship during the American Civil War

=== Rocket, space ===
- Ceres rocket family, a spacelaunch rocket series from Galactic Energy
  - Ceres-1, a Chinese four stage carrier rocket by Galactic Energy
- CERES (satellite), a French spy satellite program

== Arts, entertainment, and media ==
- Ceres (band), a band from Melbourne, Australia
- Ceres (sculpture), a c.1770 statuette by Augustin Pajou
- "Ceres" (The Bear), a TV episode released in 2022
- Ceres (2005), an orchestral work by Mark-Anthony Turnage
- Sailor Ceres, a character in Sailor Moon media
- The titular character of Ceres, Celestial Legend, a manga and mini anime series
- Ceres Space Colony, from the video game Super Metroid

== Brands and enterprises ==
- Ceres Brewery, a brewery in Aarhus, Denmark
- Ceres Cafe, Chicago, Illinois, United States
- Ceres Fruit Juices, a South African juice company
- Ceres Hellenic Shipping Enterprises, a Greek shipping company
- Ceres, Inc., a US energy crop seeds developer
- Ceres Liner, a bus company in the Philippines
- Ceres (organization), a coalition of investors and environmentalists (formerly the Coalition for Environmentally Responsible Economies)

== Education ==
- Ceres Connection, a cooperative program between MIT's Lincoln Laboratory and the Society for Science and the Public dedicated for promoting science education
- Ceres School, an historic school building located at Ceres in Allegany County, New York
- Ceres (women's fraternity), a women's fraternity focused on agriculture

== Sport ==
- Ceres Futebol Clube, a Brazilian football team from the city of Rio de Janeiro
- SK Ceres, a Norwegian sports team from Skedsmo, Akershus
- United City F.C., a Philippine football team formerly known as Ceres–Negros F.C.

== People ==
- Dragoș Cereș (born 2004), a Moldovan chess master

== Computing, software, electronics ==
- Ceres (workstation), a computer workstation built at ETH Zürich
- Ceres Chess Engine, an experimental chess engine that uses Leela Chess Zero networks

== Groups, organizations ==
- Centre for Research on Energy Security (CeRES), an Indian research center on geopolitics and energy
- Coalition for Environmentally Responsible Economies
- Centre d'études, de recherches et d'éducation socialiste (French: Center of Socialist Studies, Research and Education), a left-wing political organization founded by Jean-Pierre Chevènement

== Other uses ==
- Ceres series (disambiguation), several series of postage stamps representing the goddess Ceres
- California Environmental Resources Evaluation System
- Clouds and the Earth's Radiant Energy System, an ongoing NASA meteorological experiment.
- Plural of cere, a part of the bill of certain birds

== See also ==
- Colonization of Ceres
- Keres (disambiguation)
  - Keres (mythology), death spirits unconnected with Ceres
- Seres (disambiguation)
- Cere (disambiguation)
