= Ceres (ship) =

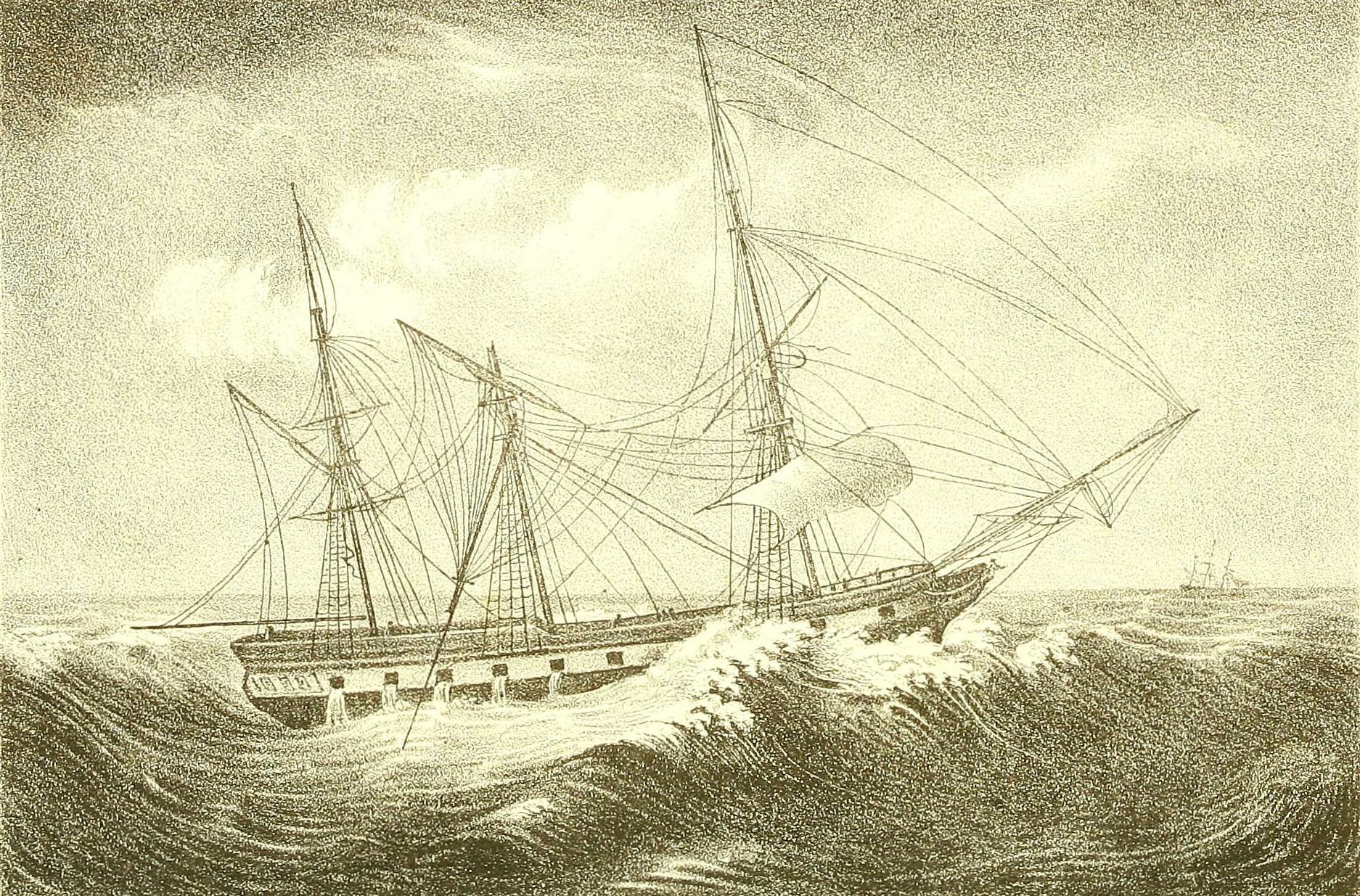
Storm encountered in the Ceres, Captain Crow, on the passage from Dominica to Liverpool, 1804

Several ships have been named Ceres for Ceres, the Roman goddess of agriculture:

- Ceres (1785 ship), of 165 tons (bm), was launched at Newfoundland and made nine voyages as a whaler between 1788 and 1819.
- Mackworth (1779 ship) was launched at Neath in 1779. The Admiralty immediately hired her and from June 1779 to March 1783 she served as an armed ship. Between 1783 and 1786 Mackworth traded with the Baltic and the West Indies. In 1786 new owners renamed her Ceres. Ceres was last listed in 1794 with data unchanged since 1791.
- Ceres (1787 Ipswich ship), of 67 tons (bm), made two voyages as a whaler in the British Southern Whale Fishery. On 28 August 1821 she was wrecked on the island of Tanameira, the South Pacific. The inhabitants murdered Captain Lancaster and seven of his crew.
- Ceres (1794 ship) was launched at Whitby. She made two voyages for the British East India Company (EIC). Thereafter she remained a London-based transport. She was last listed in 1816.
- Ceres (1794 Calcutta ship) was launched at Calcutta in August 1793 as Lutchmy and renamed in 1794. She sailed to England in 1798 and became a West Indiaman. She was condemned at Barbados in 1806. New owners returned her to service, first as a West Indiaman and then as an East Indiaman. She was damaged at Mauritius in 1818 and although she was listed until 1824, it is not clear that she sailed again after the damage she had sustained in Mauritius.
- Ceres, of 125 tons (bm), was launched in Wales in 1798. On 20 January 1814 the transport Lord Wellington ran her down off the Lizard and sank her.
- Ceres (1800 ship) was launched in France in 1784. The British captured her circa 1800 and sold her as a prize. Once under British ownership she sailed to the Mediterranean, but in 1801 she started sailing in the slave trade. She made four voyages as a slave ship, gathering slaves in West Africa and delivering them to the West Indies. After the abolition of the British slave trade in 1807 she became a West Indiaman, and then an East Indiaman. She was last listed in 1822.
- Ceres (1802 ship) was launched at Bermuda. She came to Liverpool in 1806 and commenced a voyage as a slave ship. She was wrecked in late 1806 or early 1807 as she was leaving Africa for the West Indies, unfortunately with a full cargo of slaves, all of whom apparently were lost.
- Ceres (blockade runner), run aground near the Cape Fear River, North Carolina in 1863

== See also ==
- Ceres (East Indiaman) – one of three vessels that sailed for the British East India Company
- HMS Ceres – one of three vessels of the Royal Navy, or one of three shore establishments
- French ship Céres - ships of the French Navy
- USS Ceres (1856)
