= Cere (disambiguation) =

The cere is a part of the beak in some bird species.

Cere may also refer to:

== People ==
- Daniel Cere, professor of religious studies at McGill University
- Jean-Nicolas Céré, French botanist and agronomist in the 18th–19th centuries
- Pierre Céré (born 1959), Quebec activist, writer and politician

== Places ==
- Cère, Landes, a commune in southwestern France
- Céré-la-Ronde, a commune in central France
- Cēres Parish, Kandava Municipality, western Latvia
- Cere, Sveta Nedelja, a village in Istria, Croatia
- Cere, Žminj, a village in Istria, Croatia

== Other ==
- Cere Junda, a character in the video game Star Wars Jedi: Fallen Order
- Cère, a river in southwestern France
- Cēre Manor, a manor house in western Latvia
