= Kires =

Kires may refer to:

- Ali Kireş (born 1991), Turkish footballer

== See also ==
- Keres (disambiguation)
- Keris (disambiguation)
- Kiris (disambiguation)
