= Kiris =

Kiris may refer to:

- Kiriş, a neighborhood of Kemer, Turkey
- Kiris Valley, a valley in Gilgit-Baltistan, Pakistan

== See also ==
- Keris (disambiguation)
- Kires (disambiguation)
- Kuris (disambiguation)
