= South Coast (California) =

Coastal region of California, United States

- Region of California
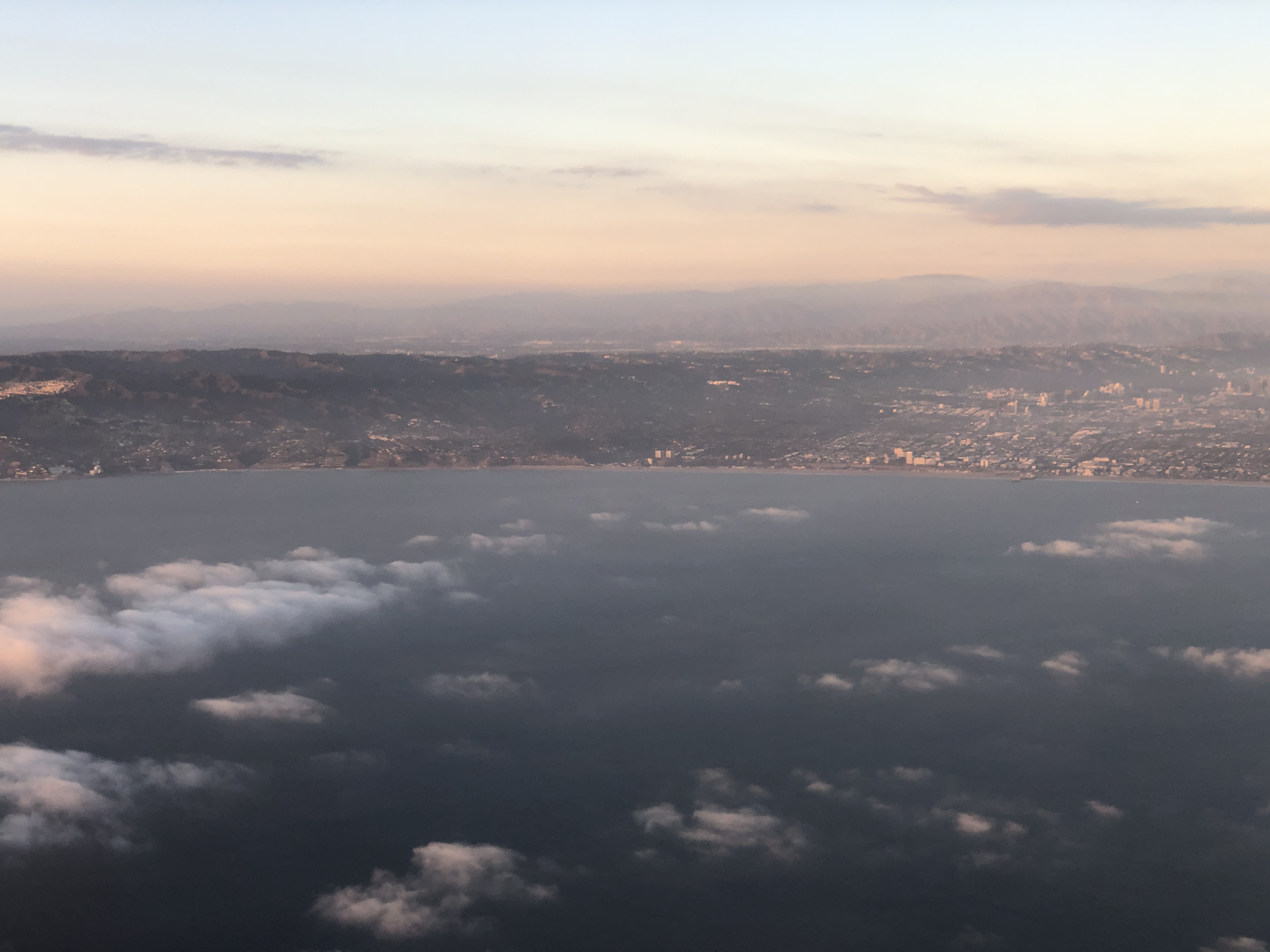

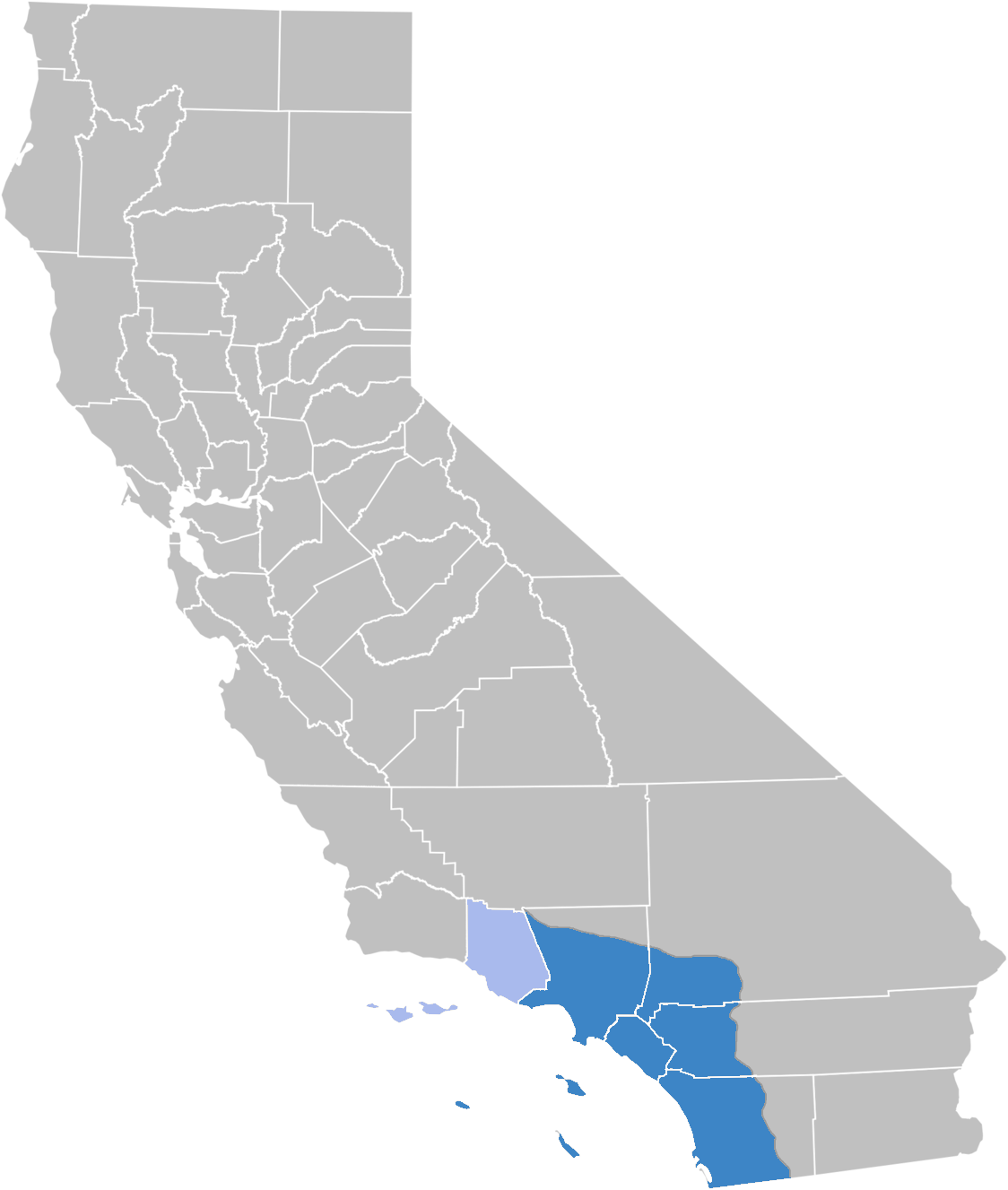
- Location of the South Coast in California (Ventura County, shown in lighter shade, is more commonly classified as part of Southern California, though some definitions place it on the Central Coast)
- Country: United States
- State: California

Population (1990)
  - Total: 16.1 million

The South Coast is a region of California, making up roughly the southernmost quarter of the Californian coast.

A Southern California coastal bioregion is defined by California Environmental Resources Evaluation System (CERES) as including parts of six counties: the western section of Ventura, all of Orange, the majority of Los Angeles, the southwestern corner of San Bernardino, the western area of Riverside, and the majority of western San Diego. CERES calls this the South Coast Bioregion.

== See also ==
- Central Coast (California)
- North Coast (California)
- South Coast Air Basin
- Southern California
