= Robert d'Humières =

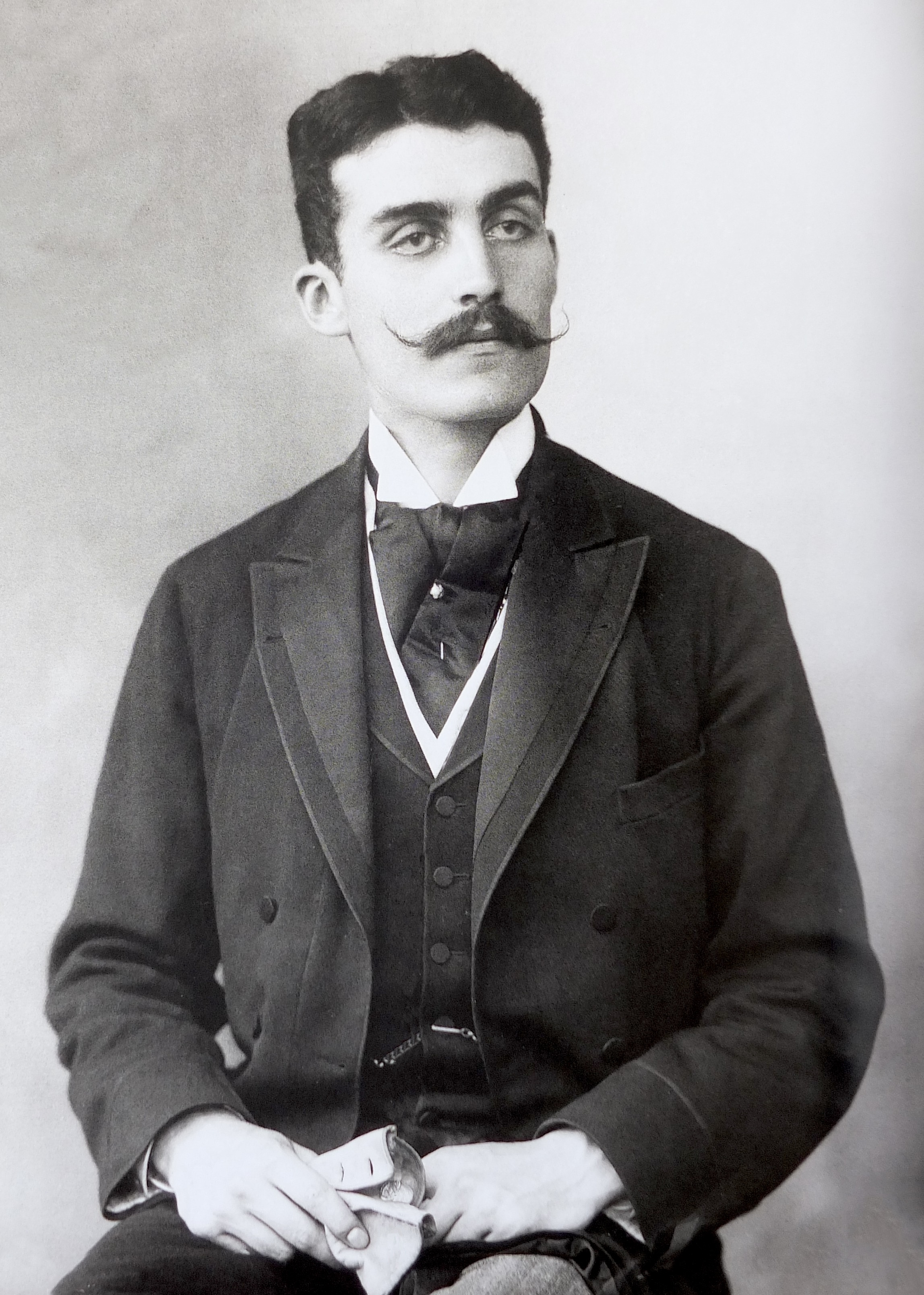
Robert d'Humières, photographed by Paul Nadar in 1895.

Aymeric Eugène Robert d’Humières (2 March 1868 – 26 April 1915) was a French man of letters, poet, chronicler, translator and theatre director.

== Biography ==
Robert d'Humières was born on 2 March 1868 at the Château de Conros, Arpajon-sur-Cère in Cantal département. A former pupil of Saint-Cyr, he returned to civilian life. Called up for the duration of the First World War as captain with the 4e régiment de zouaves, he was killed on 26 April 1915 at Lizerne. (in the defence of Ypres). He was cited in army orders as être mort en héros en combattant à la tête de son unité ("died heroically in combat at the head of his unit"). He was posthumously awarded the title of Chevalier de la Légion d'honneur.

He was the son of Count Aymeric d'Humières (1839–1923) and the Countess, née Norah Kelly, an American of Irish origin, born in Connecticut (1842–1922), the daughter of Robert Kelly. In 1905, he married Marie de Dampierre (1881–1917); they had three children.

A friend of Marcel Proust, he helped the latter with his translation of John Ruskin's The Bible of Amiens.

He was friend of Oscar Wilde who gave him a dedicated copy of his Poems (Paris, collection Jean-David Jumeau-Lafond).

== Career ==
D'Humières is known due to his friendship with Proust and the translations he made (in collaboration with Louis Fabulet) of the works of Rudyard Kipling.

He was made director of the théâtre des Arts, from 1907 to 1909. He presented his silent drama The Tragedy of Salome with the American dancer Loie Fuller in his first season; Diaghilev reused this poem for his ballet 1913.

== Works ==
D'Humières developed an aesthetic of high and enlightened thoughts expressed in a dazzling form, sometimes mixing poetry and science. His epistolary novel, Lettres volées (1911), is of no less value than Les Liaisons dangereuses.

- 1894 La Belle au Bois Dormant, dramatic fairy tale in three acts written in collaboration with Henry Bataille and premiered on 24 May 1894. Music by Georges Hüe.
- 1895 "Les Temps nouveaux de M. de Castellane", article published in La Revue blanche no.56, 1 October 1895.
- 1900 "Voyage", article published in le Mercure de France no.125, May 1900.
- 1902 'Du Désir aux Destinées, Paris, Société du Mercure de France, 1902 (poems).
- 1904 L'Ile et l'Empire de Grande-Bretagne. Angleterre – Égypte – Inde, Paris, Société du Mercure de France, 1904.
- 1907 La Tragédie de Salomé, silent drama in two acts and seven tableaux, music by Florent Schmitt.
- 1908 "Bernard Shaw", article published in Comoedia, 5 May 1908.
- 1911 Lettres volées – Roman d'Aujourd'hui, Paris, Librairie Félix Juven.

Some of his poems were set to music by Charles Koechlin and Armande de Polignac.
