= Château de Conros =

Medieval castle in Auvergne-Rhône-Alpes, France

Coordinates: 44°52′46″N 2°25′15″E

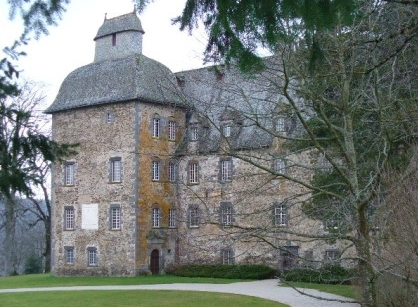
Southern façade

The Château de Conros is a medieval castle, later heavily modified, situated in Arpajon-sur-Cère in the Cantal département of France.

Robert d'Humières, grandfather of the present owners, was born here. He was a noted literary figure who translated the works of Rudyard Kipling into French.

== Description ==
Built by Astorg d'Aurillac in around 1130, the site occupies a rocky outcrop overlooking the Cère river. Later converted into a comfortable Renaissance dwelling, the château remains a family home. The gardens were redesigned in the 19th century.

The castle was recorded in 1230 as a super novo edificio, later as a repario, and in 1269 as a castrum.

The present building has several distinct parts: the north tower (the oldest), the south tower, a rectangular two-floored residence, a pavilion wing with lantern covering forming a dovecote. The whole is surmounted by another floor supported on corbels.

The château incorporates sections from various periods. There are elements from the 13th century in the cellars and ground floor and from the 15th century on the first floor. The bulk dates from the 16th century, with heavy remodelling in the 17th century to the upper floors, notably the Imperial dome.

- On the first floor is a 15th-century chimney from the Château de Branzac which is entirely painted. This chimney owes its decoration to artists brought from Italy by Camille Carracioli, a Neapolitan princess, wife of the lord of Branzac (1570).
- The staircase has landings opening onto the steps through two round arches jointly supported on columns with Doric or Ionic capitals. Each landing is covered by a rib vault.

The stone-covered roof has a surface area of 1200 m^{2}. There are 70 windows, some of which retain their 18th-century woodwork.

The Château de Conros is open to visitors. It was added to the list of monuments historiques by the French Ministry of Culture on 30 September 1991.

== See also ==
- List of castles in France

== Bibliography ==
- Jean-Baptiste de Ribier du Châtelet, Dictionnaire statistique, ou Histoire, description et statistique du département du Cantal, Aurillac, 1852
- Roger Grand, "Les chartes de franchises de la Roquebrou (1281–1282) et de Conros 1317", (32pp) in Comité des travaux historiques et scientifiques. Bulletin historique et philologique, année 1902, n° 1 and 2.
