= Armande de Polignac =

French composer

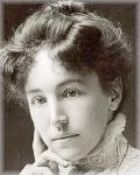
Armande de Polignac

Armande de Polignac, comtesse de Chabannes-La Palice (Marie Armande Mathilde; 8 January 1876 – 29 April 1962) was a French composer, the niece of Prince Edmond de Polignac and Princess Winnaretta de Polignac, the patron of Ravel, Stravinsky and Milhaud. She studied privately with Eugène Gigout and Gabriel Fauré, as well as with Vincent d'Indy at the Schola Cantorum.

De Polignac married the Comte de Chabanne la Palice.

== Biography ==
Born in 1876, Armande de Polignac was the only daughter from the first marriage of Camille de Polignac and Marie Adolphine Langenberger; Marie Adolphine died within a week of giving birth. From a very young age, Armande de Polignac was passionate about foreign languages, speaking a dozen of them, and cultivated a lifelong attraction to and strong taste for musical creation.

She began her harmony studies in London. She then studied composition in Paris under the tutelage of Gabriel Fauré, Eugène Gigout, and Vincent d'Indy at the Schola Cantorum. D'Indy also gave her conducting lessons, and she played viola in the Schola orchestra.

She married Count Alfred de Chabannes La Palice, a music lover and amateur singer, in 1895. They had only one daughter, Hedwige. Until the loss of her inheritance in the 1930s, she devoted herself to her passion. Her daughter stated: "She had dedicated her life to music, worked diligently, and sacrificed pleasure and worldly pursuits."

She supported Edgar Varèse, whom she had met at the Schola Cantorum, by raising funds in 1915 so that he could travel to the United States.

From its founding in 1905, Armande de Polignac became a contributor to the Mercure musical, a journal founded by Louis Laloy. From its inception, Claude Debussy, Romain Rolland, Jean Marnold, and Willy also contributed to the journal, and she published several articles as a critic under the title "Pensées d'Ailleurs" (Thoughts from Elsewhere).

In 1920, she composed her cycle of eight songs on Chinese poems translated by Franz Toussaint, La Flûte de Jade (The Jade Flute), and a short collection, L'Amour fardé (Make-Up Love). She set a text by Lucie Delarue-Mardrus to music and published songs based on poems by Melchior Polignac, Edouard Guyot, Louis Longepierre, Robert d'Humières, Georges de Dubor, and others. With Willy, she wrote songs such as Café Maure (Moorish Café), Chemin de Mihaïl (Mihail's Path), Le Dernier Menuet du Roy (The King's Last Minuet), Nuit à Capri (Night in Capri), Poème (Poem), Pastel (Pastel), and Soir de Jardin (Garden Evening). She also composed several settings of poems by Françoise d'Antoine: Le Vieux clavecin, Printemps morts, Mélancolie, and Berceuse.

Her piano music is equally significant: Danses Brèves, which she orchestrated and conducted in concert; Six Préludes; Toccata, dedicated to Ricardo Viñes; Berceuse; Échappée; Pluie; Carillon; Dans le steppe; and Bazar d'orient, a nocturne for harp (1912); and the Petite Suite pour clavecin (1939), dedicated to Marcelle de Lacour. She also composed three string quartets, two sonatas for violin and piano, a piano quintet dedicated to Louis Laloy (February 19, 1918), two pieces for wind quintet, and various pieces for flute and piano, violin and piano, or cello and piano. She presented works six times at the Société musicale indépendante between 1911 and 1922. Maurice Ravel showed some interest in her music.

Her catalogue also includes about fifteen symphonic pieces, a dozen pieces of light music, an overture to Lear, Salome, and a symphonic poem. In the field of opera and ballet, notable works include: The Little Mermaid (Nice, March 5, 1907), The Roses of the Caliphs (Paris, 1909), the Arabian ballet One Thousand and One Nights (Paris, 1914), the Japanese ballet Urashima, The Distant Spring, and the ballet The Chinese.

She composed Judith of Bethulia, an unpublished dramatic scene sung by Felia Litvinne at the Paris Opera in March 1916. In 1930, following an illness, she ceased composing and promoting her works.

Armande de Polignac died in 1962 in Neauphle-le-Vieux. She is buried in the cemetery of this town, in the funerary chapel of Casimir de Rochechouart de Mortemart, great-grandfather of her husband.

== Works ==
Selected works include:

=== Piano music ===
- Prélude en mi (1901)
- Barcarolle (1901)
- Danses mièvres (1902)
- Pluie (1905)
- Berceuse (1906)
- Nocturne (1907)
- Miroitement (1907)
- Ballade (1912)
- Danse persane (1923)

=== Chamber music ===
- Sonata for violin and piano (1902)
- Sonata in B flat, for piano and violin (1910)
- Nocturne for harp (1912)
- Danse égyptienne, for violin and piano (1913)
- Quintet four two violins, viola, cello and piano (1916)

=== Symphonic music ===
- Les Mille et une nuits, symphonic suite in three parts (1913)

=== Songs ===
- La flûte de jade song cycle
  - Chant d'amour (Text: Franz Toussaint after Chen-Teuo-Tsan)
  - Ki-Fong (Text: Franz Toussaint after Tschang-So-Su)
  - Ki-Fong (Text: after Franz Toussaint)
  - La rose rouge (Text: Franz Toussaint after Li-Tai-Po)
  - Le heron blanc (Text: Franz Toussaint after Li-Tai-Po)
  - Le palais ruiné (Text: Franz Toussaint after Tu Fu)
  - Li-Si (Text: Franz Toussaint after Li-Tai-Po)
  - Li-Si (Text: after Franz Toussaint)
  - Ngo Gay Ngy (Text: Franz Toussaint after Wou-Hao)
  - Ngo Gay Ngy (Text: after Franz Toussaint)

=== Dramas and operas ===
- La Petite Sirène, Opera in three acts (libretto: Henry Gauthier-Villars) (1908)
- Les Roses du calife, lyric drama in 1 act, Georges de Dubor (1909)
- Judith de Béthulée, scène dramatique (1916)

=== Ballets ===
- Urashima (1900)
- La Source Lointaine
