= Ceris =

Ceris or CERIS may refer to:

- CERIS, a beverage company of Cabo Berde
- Ceris Gilfillan, British racing cyclist

== See also ==
- Ceres (disambiguation)
- Cerris
- Cerys
- Seris
