= Bretenoux =

- Commune
- Location of Bretenoux
- Location within France Location within Occitanie
- Coordinates: 44°54′54″N 1°50′21″E
- Country: France
- Region: Occitania
- Department: Lot
- Arrondissement: Figeac
- Canton: Cère et Ségala

Government
  - Mayor (2020–2026): Pierre Moles
- Area^{1}: 5.69 km^{2} (2.20 sq mi)
- Elevation: 136 m (446 ft)
- Highest elevation: 245 m (804 ft)
- Lowest elevation: 129 m (423 ft)
- Population (2023): 1,468
  - Density: 258/km^{2} (668/sq mi)
- Time zone: UTC+01:00 (CET)
  - Summer (DST): UTC+02:00 (CEST)
- INSEE/Postal code: 46038 /46130
- ^{1} French Land Register data, which excludes lakes, ponds, glaciers > 1 km^{2} (0.386 sq mi or 247 acres) and river estuaries.

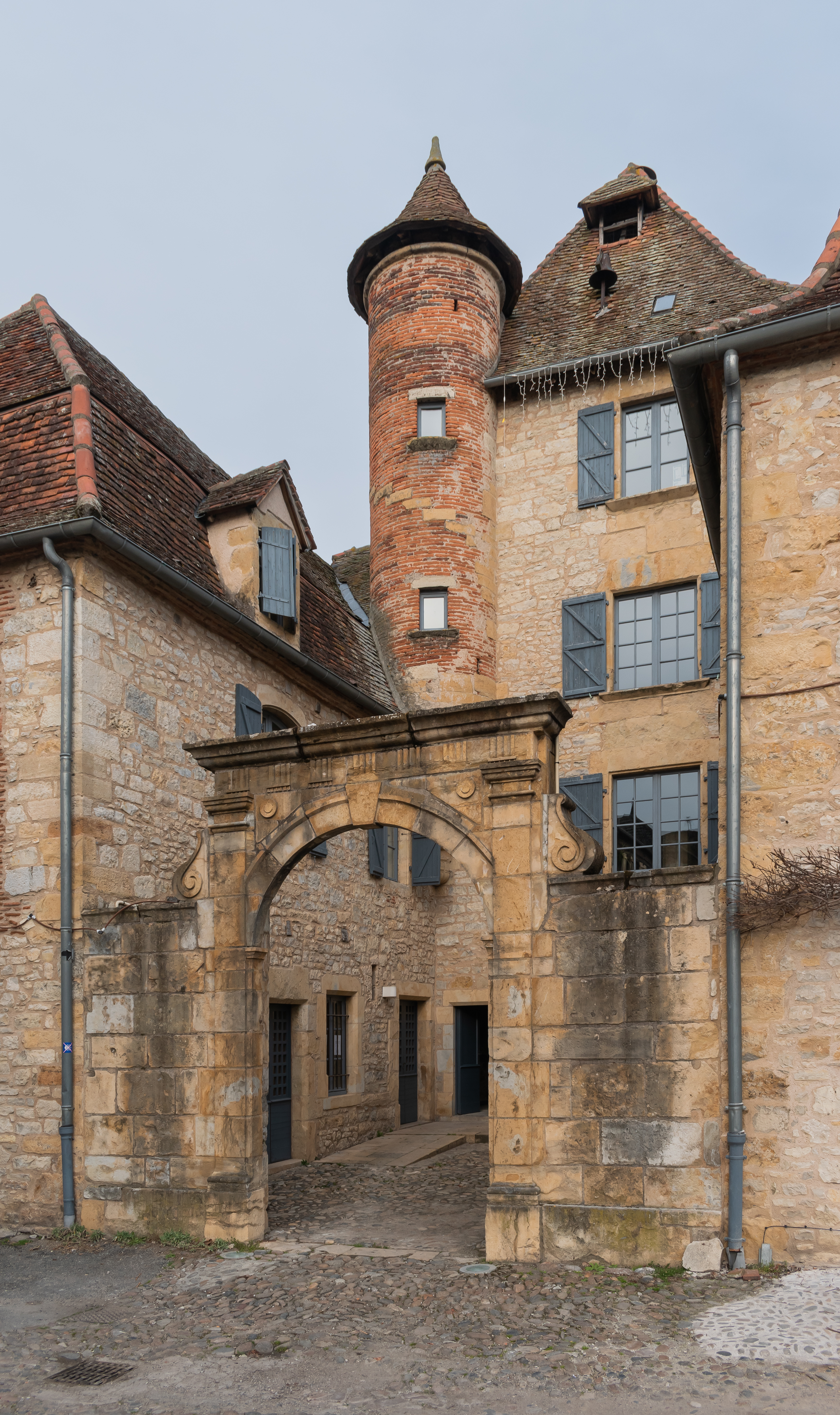
Town hall

Bretenoux (French pronunciation: [bʁətnu]; Occitan: Bertenor) is a commune in the Lot department in southwestern France. The old town, a bastide, is laid out on a grid and has houses dating from the 13th to the 16th century.

== Location ==
Bretenoux is located north of the River Lot, near the border with the Corrèze department, in the Dordogne Valley, and Bretenoux is attached to the town of Biars-sur-Cère. It is watered by the rivers Cère and Le Mamoul. The D940 and D803 national roads run through it.

== Toponymy ==
The name Bretenoux derives from Brittanorum villa, which means "the domain, the property, of the Breton villa" and may reflect the settlement in the area in the 5th and 6th centuries of Romano-British people fleeing the Anglo-Saxon invasion of England.

== History ==
The settlement is first mentioned in the monastery of Beaulieu's cartulary in 866, as Villa Bretenoro.

Guérin, lord of Castelnau de Bretenoux, founded the bastide in 1277 as a counterpoint to the royal bastide of Puybrun, originally under the name Villafranca d'Orilenda (or Orlanda, Orlinda). He granted the town fishing rights, access to the river islands, and two markets a year on condition a wall was constructed around the town with moats and four gates.

On 9 June 1944, a group of twenty-seven French Resistance members led by Fritz Holtzmann from the Corrèze Armée secrète attempted to stop a column of the 2nd SS Panzer Division Das Reich advancing via Tulle towards Limoges to re-enforce the German army attempting to stop the Allies on the D-day beaches. The Resistance had barricaded the bridge with tree stumps and manned the bridge, riverbank, and surrounding roof tops. Around 06:30am the SS column had advanced from their lager at Saint-Céré, and the battle for the bridge lasted before SS units crossed river and flanked the resistance. With the bridge siege lifted, nineteen members of the Resistance had died and thirteen civilians murdered after they had failed to flee the town. The SS column then continued their advance to Tulle via Beaulieu-sur-Dordogne and La Grafouillère.

== Demographics ==
Historical population
| Year | Pop. | ±% p.a. |
|---|---|---|
| 1968 | 1,071 | — |
| 1975 | 1,115 | +0.58% |
| 1982 | 1,213 | +1.21% |
| 1990 | 1,211 | −0.02% |
| 1999 | 1,231 | +0.18% |
| 2007 | 1,322 | +0.90% |
| 2012 | 1,352 | +0.45% |
| 2017 | 1,356 | +0.06% |
| 2023 | 1,468 | +1.33% |
Source: INSEE

== Local culture and heritage ==
Bretenoux has retained parts of its ramparts and its checker-board grid plan, public squares, and covered arcades. The town hall and the gendarmerie are both turreted houses.

=== Notable buildings ===
- Church of St Catherine, built outside the walls in the 17th century, externally remodelled in 1763
- Place des Consuls, surrounded by arcades and half-timbered houses.
- House of Pierre Loti
- House of the Consuls, now housing the town hall

=== Notable people ===
- Pierre François de Saint-Priest (1801 – 1851), politician, born in Bretenoux
- Louis Auguste Blanqui (1805 – 1881), revolutionary, arrested on 17 March 1871 in Bretenoux
- Adolphe de Lescure (1833 – 1892), historian and writer, born in Bretenoux
- Pierre Loti (1850 – 1923), writer, spent part of his childhood at Bretenoux and wrote about his time there
- Eugène Sol (1877 – 1953), historian, died at Bretenoux
- David Moncoutié (born 1975), professional cyclist, lived in Bretenoux

== International relations ==
Bretenoux is twinned with Glastonbury, United Kingdom.

== See also ==
- Communes of the Lot department
