= Seres =

Seres may refer to:

== People ==
- Codruț Șereș (born 1969), Romanian politician
- Ferenc Seres (born 1945), Hungarian wrestler
- Francesc Serés (born 1972), Catalan writer
- Georges Sérès (1884–1951), French cyclist
- Rudolf Seres (born 1945), Hungarian sports shooter
- Silvester Šereš (1918–2000), Yugoslav footballer
- Tim Seres (1925–2007), Australian bridge player
- William Seres (died c. 1579), English printer

== Other uses ==
- the people of Serica
- Seres Group, a Chinese company
  - Seres Auto, a brand of electric vehicle

== See also ==
- Celes (disambiguation)
- Ceres (disambiguation)
- Seles (disambiguation)
- Serres (disambiguation)
