= Arboretum d'Arpajon-sur-Cère =

Arboretum in Cantal, Auvergne, France

Coordinates: 44.8838°N 2.4790°E

The Arboretum d'Arpajon-sur-Cère (7 hectares) is an arboretum located on the Route de Labrousse, Arpajon-sur-Cère, Cantal, Auvergne, France. The arboretum was established in 1993, and now contains a variety of trees from around the world, including ash trees, maples, oaks, pines, and willows, as well as fruit trees and a labyrinth. It is open daily without charge.

== See also ==
- List of botanical gardens in France
