= Château de Carbonat =

Castle in Auvergne-Rhône-Alpes, France

Castle of Carbonat
- Château de Carbonat
- Arpajon-sur-Cère, Cantal, France
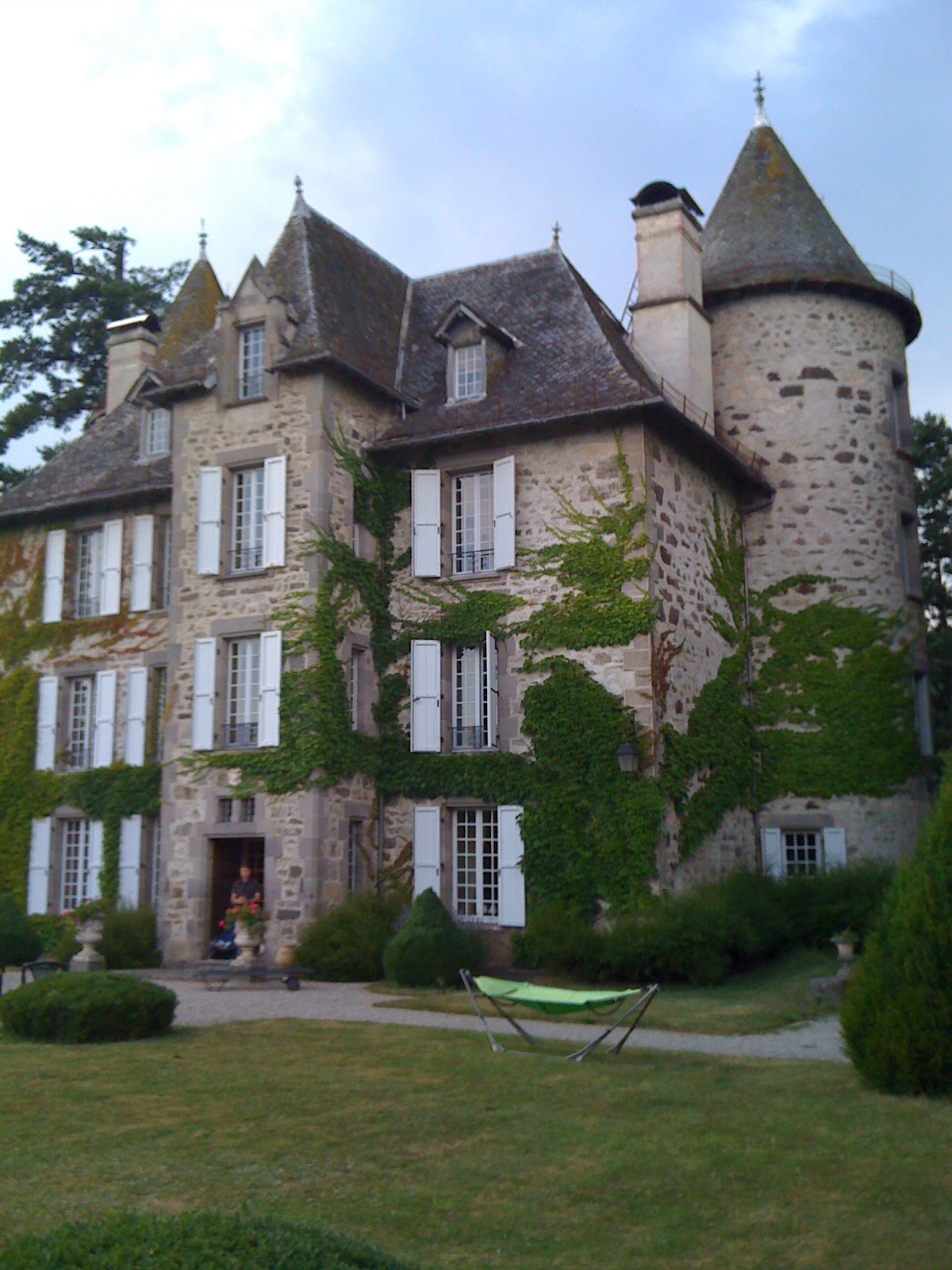
- Edifice overview

Site information
- Type: Castle
- Open to the public: No
- Condition: Restored

Location
- Coordinates: 44.9089°N 2.4877°E

Site history
- Built: 14th century

The Château de Carbonat is a French castle located in Arpajon-sur-Cère, in Cantal (Auvergne). It gradually fell to ruins, but was extensively restored in the early twentieth century.

It has French terraced gardens and a landmark park.

Records indicate that in the past it served to protect the northern entrance of the Aurillac basin.

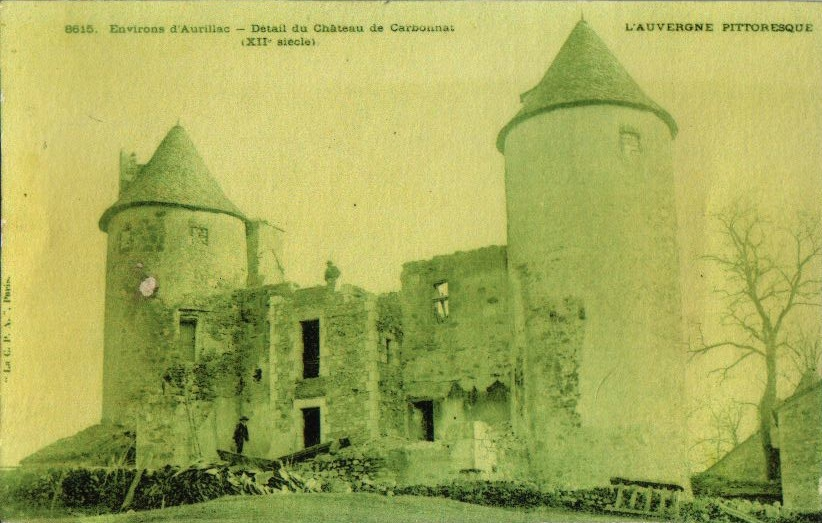
The castle before restoration

== See also ==
- List of castles in France
