= Ceres series =

"Ceres series", after Ceres, the goddess of growing plants, may mean any of several series of postage stamps:

- Ceres series (France)
- Ceres series (Portugal)
- Ceres of Corrientes (Argentina)
