= Ceres (sculpture) =

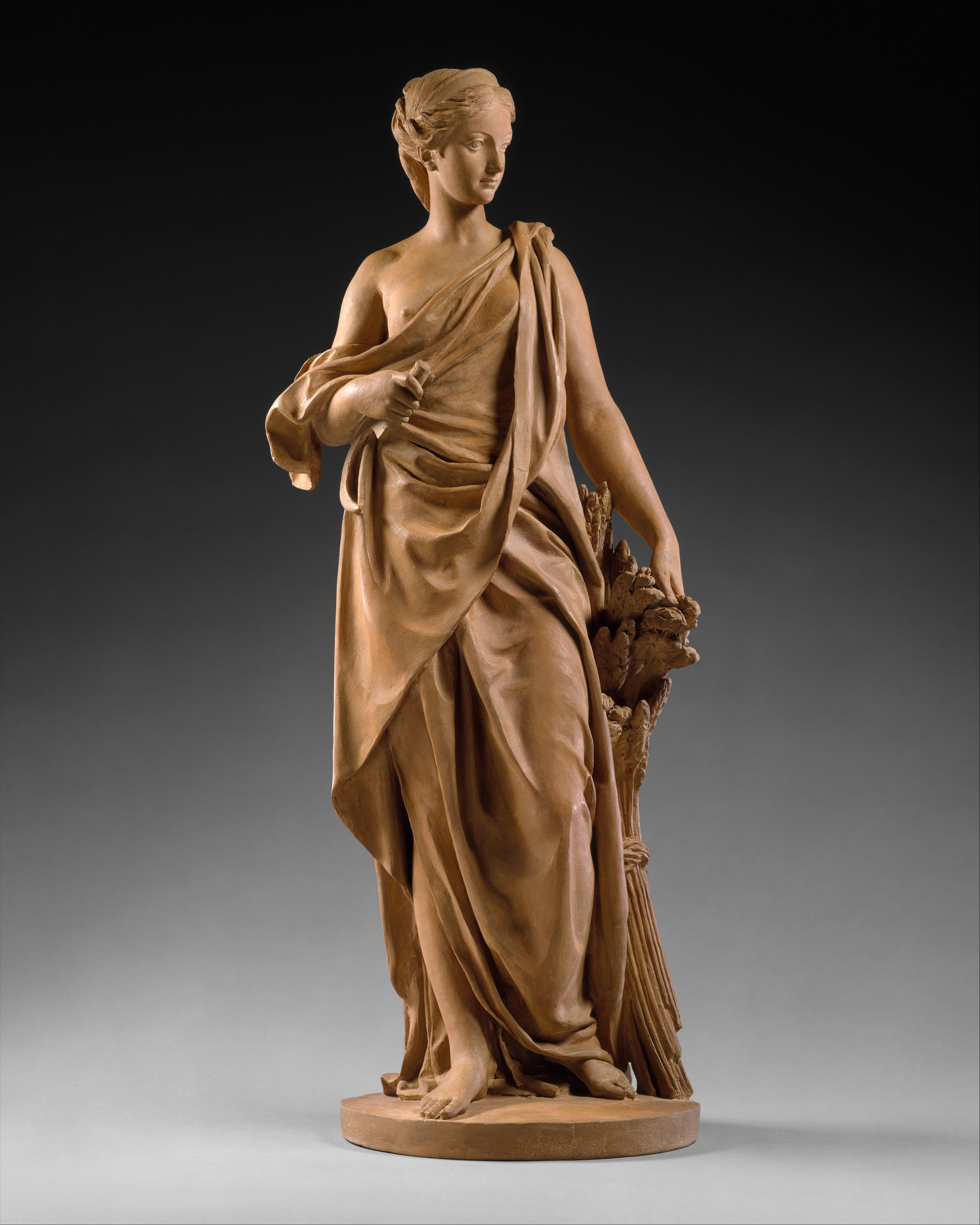
- Artist: Augustin Pajou
- Year: c. 1768–70
- Medium: Terracotta with reddish patination
- Dimensions: 62.5 cm × 19.1 cm × 19.1 cm (24.6 in × 7.5 in × 7.5 in)
- Location: Metropolitan Museum of Art; New York City

Ceres is an 18th-century statuette by Augustin Pajou depicting Ceres, a Roman goddess. The work, made from terracotta, was intended as a model for a larger marble sculpture, Four Seasons. Ceres is now in the collection of the Metropolitan Museum of Art.
