= Arpajon-sur-Cère =

Commune in Auvergne-Rhône-Alpes, France

- Commune
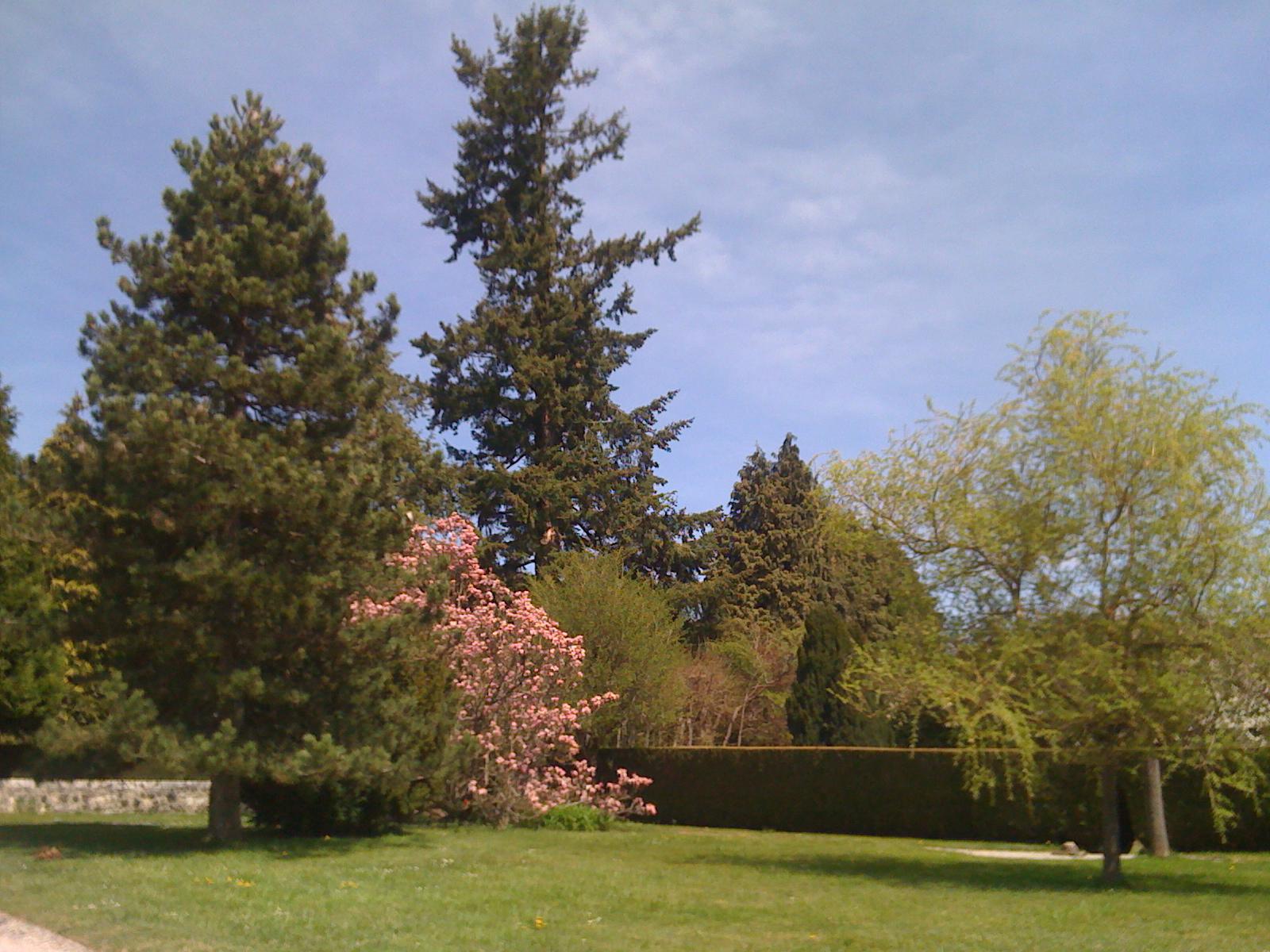
- Gardens at the Chateau of Carbonat

- Coat of arms
- Location of Arpajon-sur-Cère
- Location within France Location within Auvergne-Rhône-Alpes
- Coordinates: 44°54′17″N 2°27′27″E
- Country: France
- Region: Auvergne-Rhône-Alpes
- Department: Cantal
- Arrondissement: Aurillac
- Canton: Arpajon-sur-Cère
- Intercommunality: CA Aurillac Agglomération

Government
  - Mayor (2020–2026): Isabelle Lantuejoul
- Area^{1}: 47.67 km^{2} (18.41 sq mi)
- Elevation: 600 m (2,000 ft)
- Highest elevation: 844 m (2,769 ft)
- Lowest elevation: 566 m (1,857 ft)
- Population (2023): 6,361
  - Density: 133.4/km^{2} (345.6/sq mi)
- Time zone: UTC+01:00 (CET)
  - Summer (DST): UTC+02:00 (CEST)
- INSEE/Postal code: 15012 /15130
- ^{1} French Land Register data, which excludes lakes, ponds, glaciers > 1 km^{2} (0.386 sq mi or 247 acres) and river estuaries.

Arpajon-sur-Cère (French pronunciation: [aʁpaʒɔ̃ syʁ sɛʁ], literally Arpajon on Cère; Occitan: Arpajon de Cera or just Arpajon) is a commune in the Cantal department in the Auvergne region of south-central France.

== Geography ==
Arpajon-sur-Cère is located immediately to the south of Aurillac some 70 km south-east of Brive-la-Gaillarde. The town is an extension of the urban area of Aurillac. Access to the commune is by the D920 from Aurillac which continues south to Lafeuillade-en-Vézie. The D990 also goes from south of the town to Vézac in the east. The D58 comes from Giou-de-Mamou in the north-east then goes south-west from the town to the Château de Conros and joins the D617 at the south-western border of the commune. Much of the runway of Aurillac – Tronquières Airport is in the commune. A railway passes through the north of the commune but the nearest station is in Aurillac. Apart from the town there are the villages and hamlets of:

- Carbonnat
- Esmoles
- Le Pont
- Roquetorte
- Douarat
- Le Bousquet
- Crespiat
- Le Cambon
- Le Sal
- Les Granges
- Lapeyrusse
- Carsac
- Combelles
- Senilhes
- Les Quatre Routes
- Toules

Outside the residential areas there are extensive forests in the south and south-west with the rest of the commune farmland.

The Jordanne river flows from Aurillac to join the Cère just south-west of the town with the Cère continuing west to eventually join the Dordogne at Girac.

== Toponymy ==
The name Arpjon originates from the Gallic word Arpaionem which is composed of the word arepo meaning "plough". It was attested in 923 in the form: vicaria arpajonensis. In Carladézien dialect, Arpajon is pronounced Olpotsou, according to a recording there in 2007.

== History ==
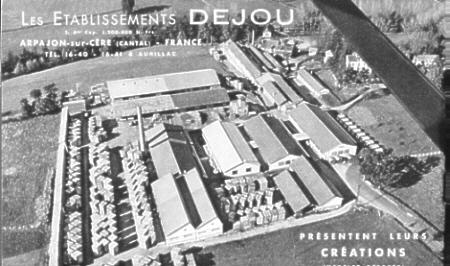
The Dejou factory

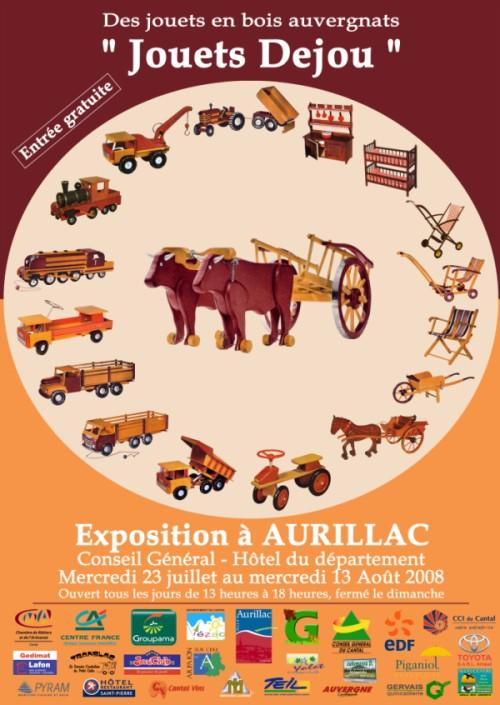
"Jouets Dejou" poster

The Dejou Féniès & son and Lartigue companies were established in the commune in the 20th century manufacturing wood especially Jouets Dejou (Dejou Toys) which are highly sought after by Doll collectors.

=== Heraldry ===
Arms of Arpajon-sur-Cère	Blazon: Azure, a bend of Or, between 6 escallops set in orle.

== Administration ==
List of Successive Mayors

From	To	Name	Party
1977	2014	Roger Destannes	PS
2014	2020	Michel Roussy	
2020	2026	Isabelle Lantuejoul	

=== Twinning ===
Arpajon-sur-Cère has twinning associations with:

- Blyth (United Kingdom) since 1990.
- Bougouni (Mali).

== Demography ==
The inhabitants of the commune are known as Arpajonnais or Arpajonnaises in French.

Historical population

Year	Pop.	±% p.a.
1793	1,836	—
1800	1,728	−0.86%
1806	2,064	+3.01%
1821	2,043	−0.07%
1831	2,234	+0.90%
1836	2,292	+0.51%
1841	2,331	+0.34%
1846	2,350	+0.16%
1851	2,271	−0.68%
1856	2,272	+0.01%
1861	2,278	+0.05%
1866	2,225	−0.47%
1872	2,106	−0.91%
1876	2,228	+1.42%
1881	2,268	+0.36%
1886	2,242	−0.23%
1891	2,268	+0.23%
1896	2,354	+0.75%
1901	2,457	+0.86%

Year	Pop.	±% p.a.
1906	2,450	−0.06%
1911	2,579	+1.03%
1921	2,332	−1.00%
1926	2,412	+0.68%
1931	2,467	+0.45%
1936	2,576	+0.87%
1946	2,824	+0.92%
1954	2,891	+0.29%
1962	3,071	+0.76%
1968	3,277	+1.09%
1975	4,260	+3.82%
1982	4,866	+1.92%
1990	5,296	+1.06%
1999	5,545	+0.51%
2007	5,924	+0.83%
2012	6,192	+0.89%
2017	6,217	+0.08%
2023	6,361	+0.38%

Source: EHESS and INSEE

== Sites and Monuments ==
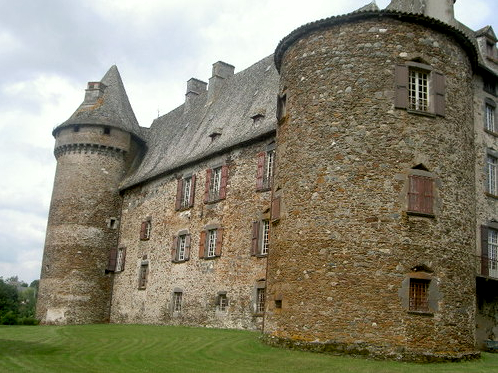
The Chateau de Conros

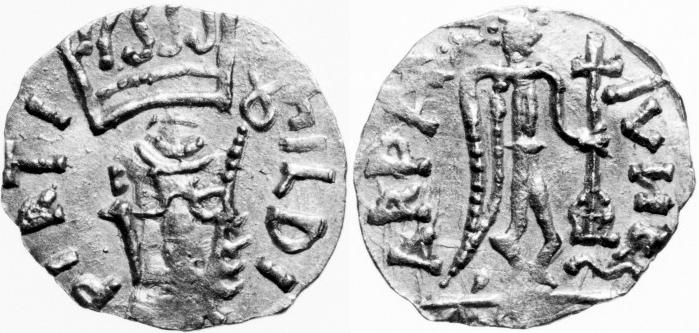
A Tremissis coin from Childebert I struck at Arpajon-sur-Cère

The commune has several sites and buildings that are registered as historical monuments:

- The Birthplace of Général Milhaud at 1 Avenue du Général-Milhaud (1753)
- The old Pont-de-Mamou Mill on Rue Jean-Jaurès (1772)
- The Château de Conros (15th century)
- The Château de Conros Park
- The Château de Carbonat Park
- The Château de Limagne Garden

Other sites of interest

- Barrière hamlet where Louis Laparra de Fieux was born.
- The Cabrières bridge, a hamlet and a bridge which once had a toll.
- The Chateau de Ganhac currently a mansion house, a former fief awarded in 1676 to Charles de Broquin who was married to Jeanne de Cambefort.
- The Château de Montal, a former fief whose family was originally the Lords of Laroquebrou and Conros, with a castrale chapel under the invocation of Saint Michael. It then became the property of the La Roque-Montal family.
- The Chateau de La Prade, purchased in 1756 by Marie-Françoise de Broglie, the widow of Charles Robert de Lignerac who did considerable work on the building. Ruined in the French Revolution.
- The Arboretum d'Arpajon-sur-Cère
- The Parish Church contains several items that are registered as historical objects:
  - 2 Bronze Bells (1781)
  - A Painting: The Placing in the Tomb (16th century)
  - A framed Painting: The Baptism of Christ (17th century)
  - A Sarcophagus (Middle Ages)

The Chateau de Carbonat Picture Gallery

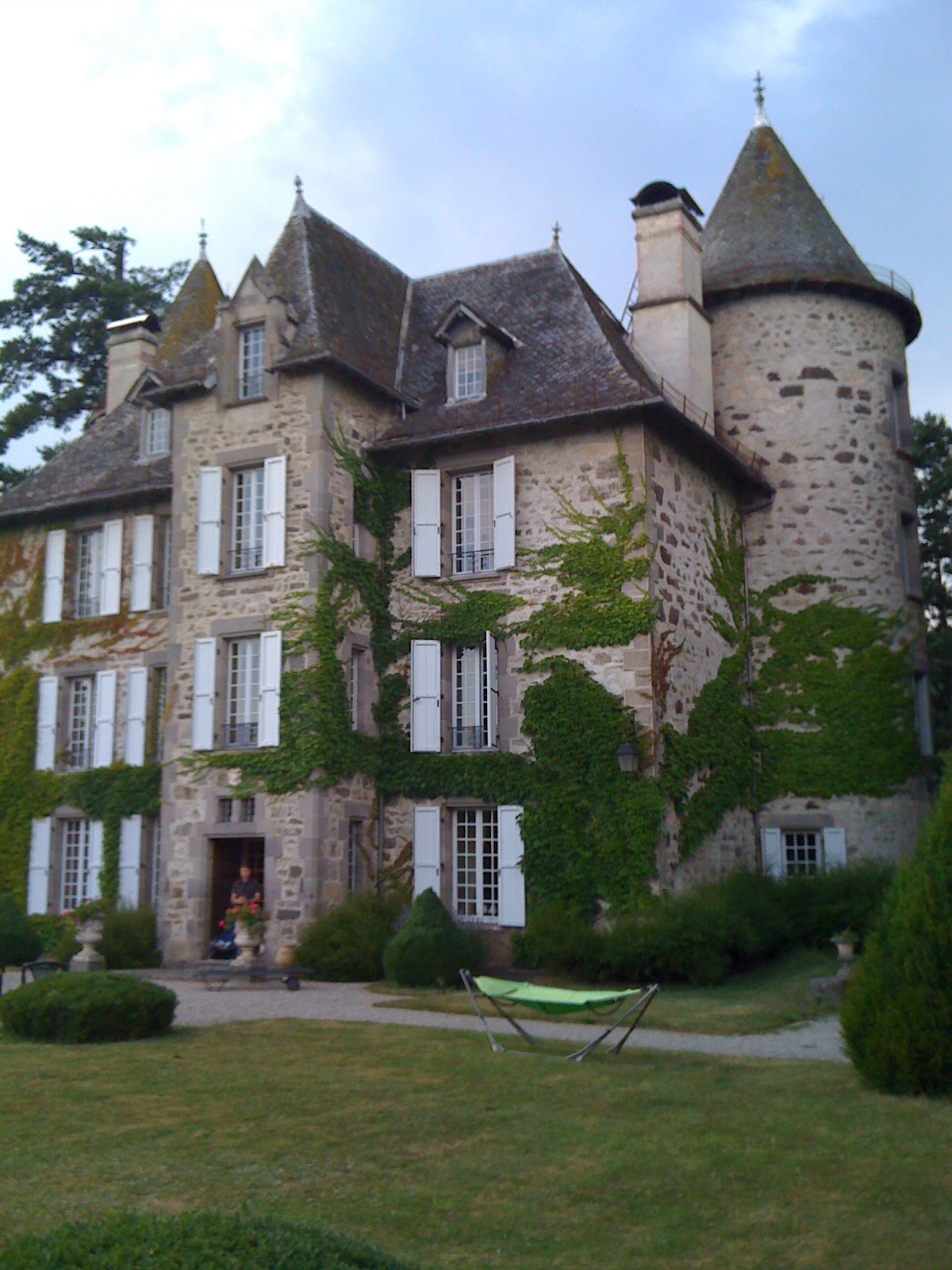
The Chateau front

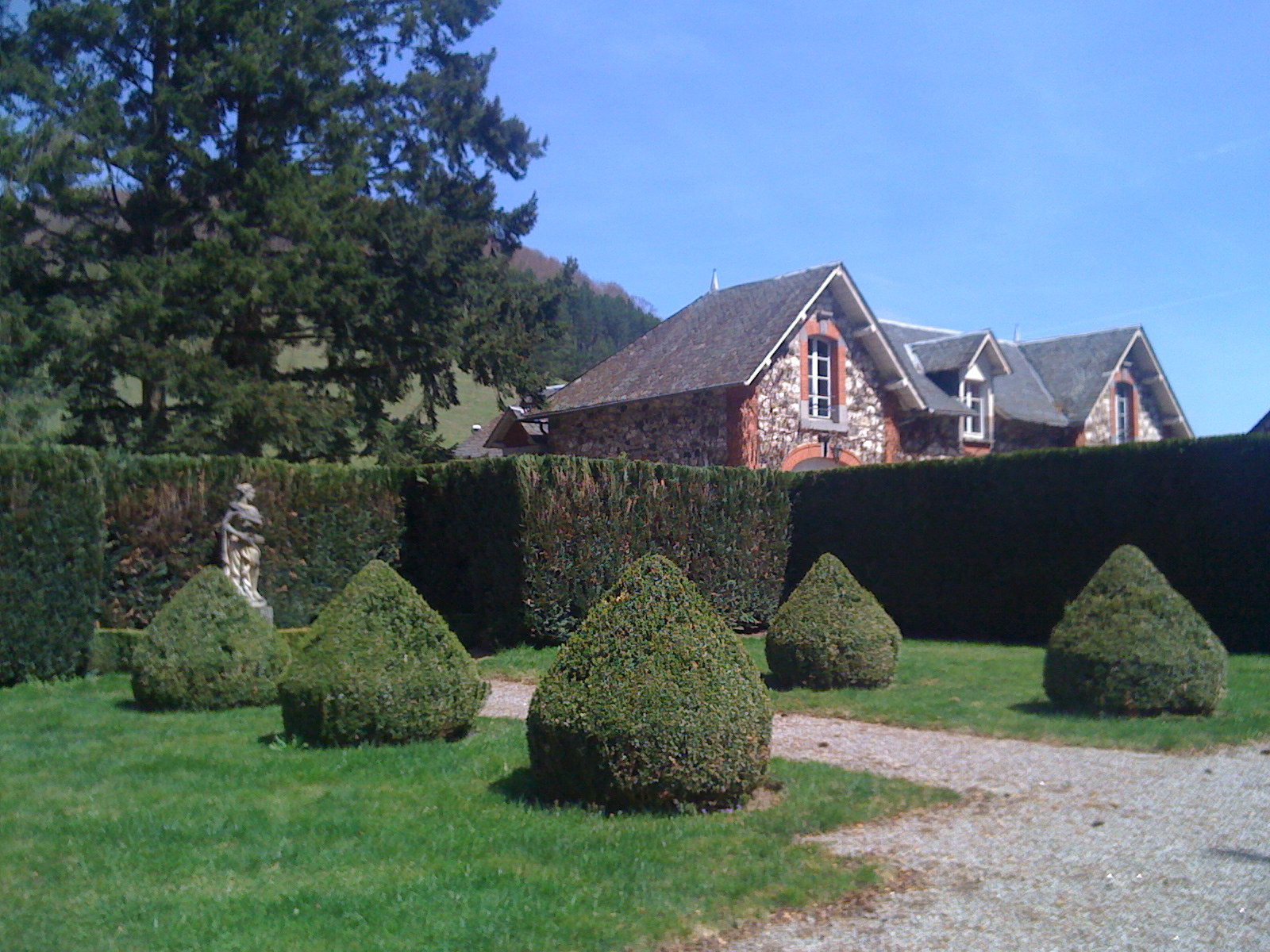
The Gardens

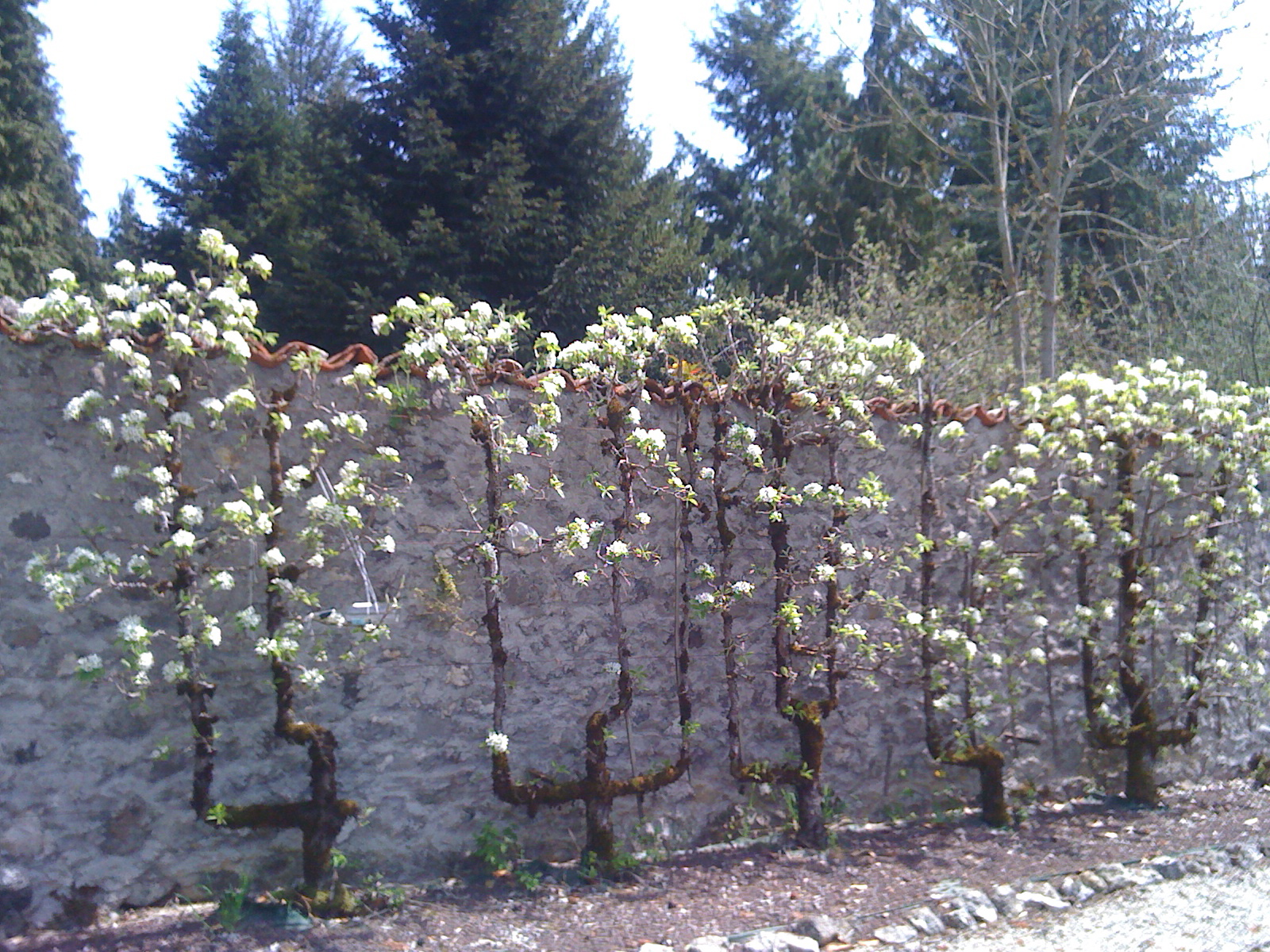
The Gardens

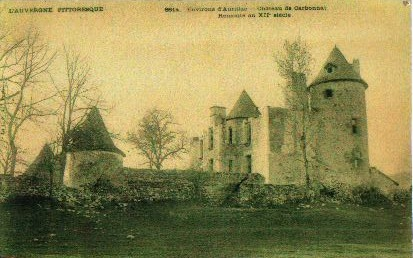
An old postcard of the chateau

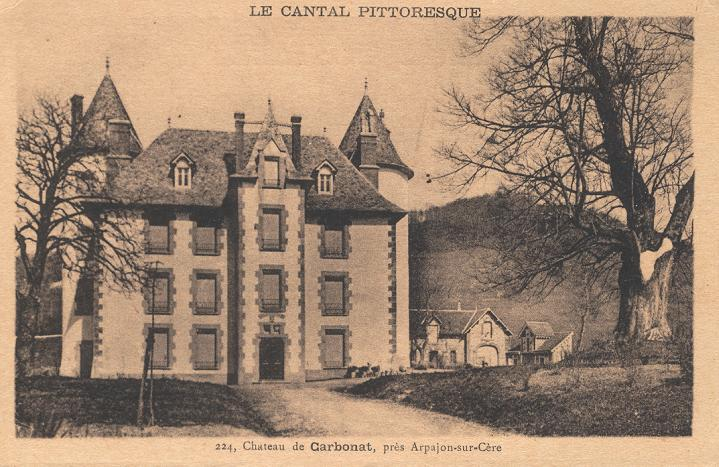
An old postcard of the chateau

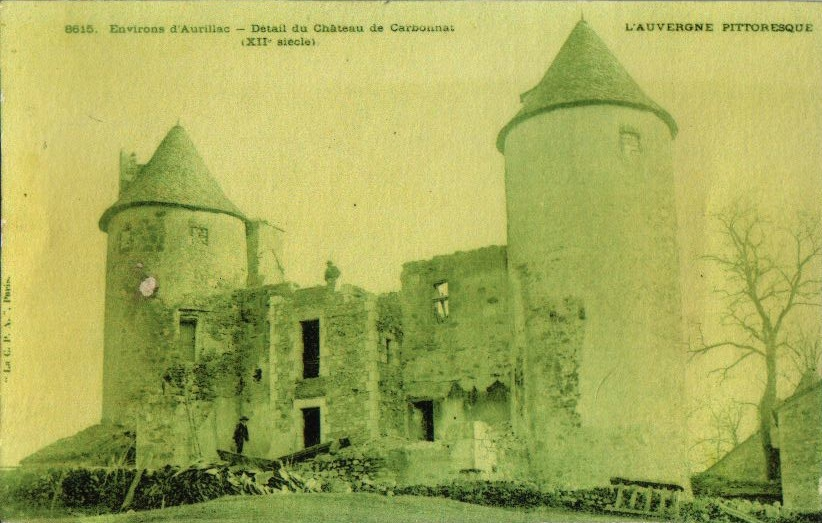
The chateau in ruins

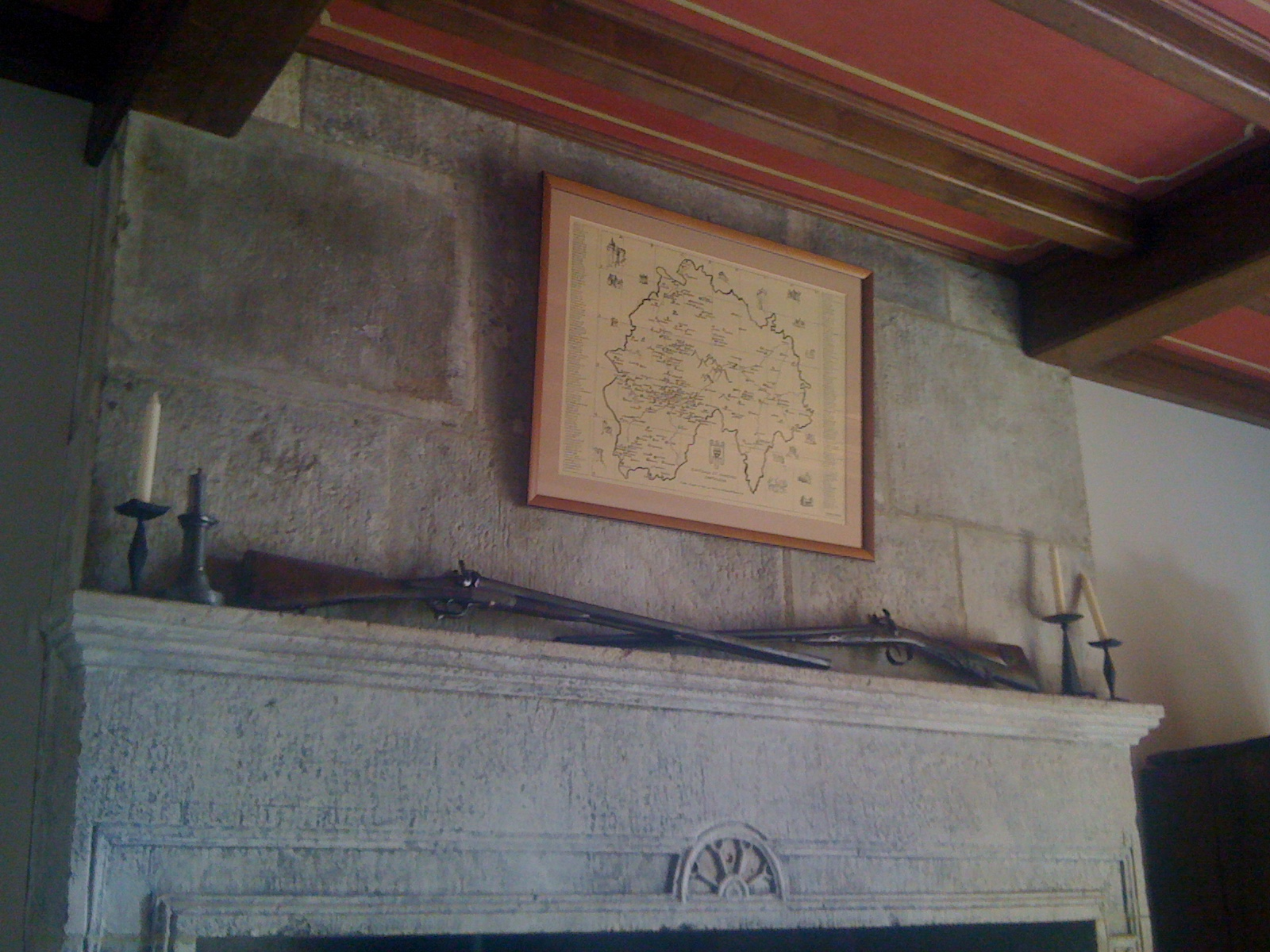
The fireplace in the chateau

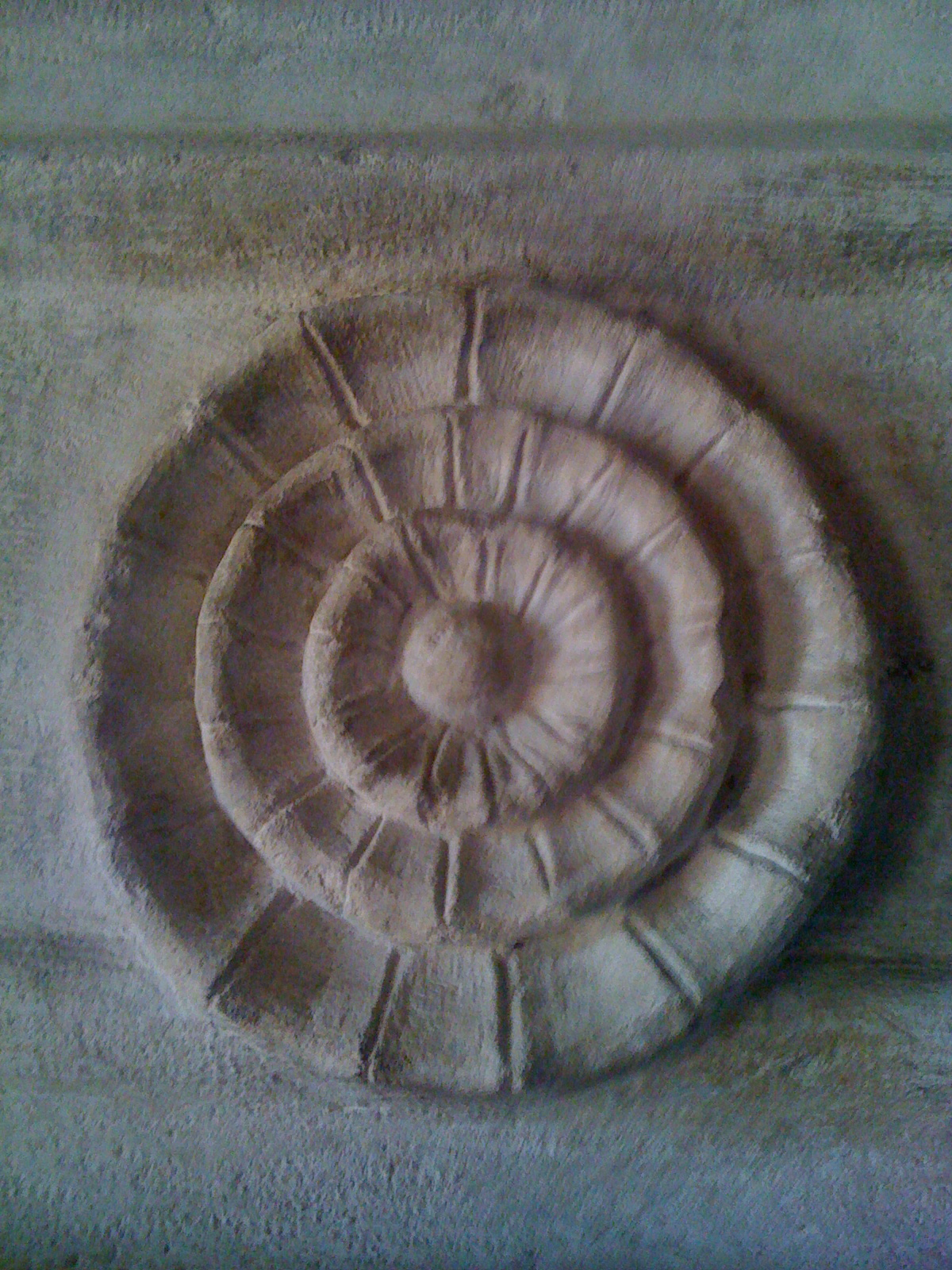
A detail on the fireplace

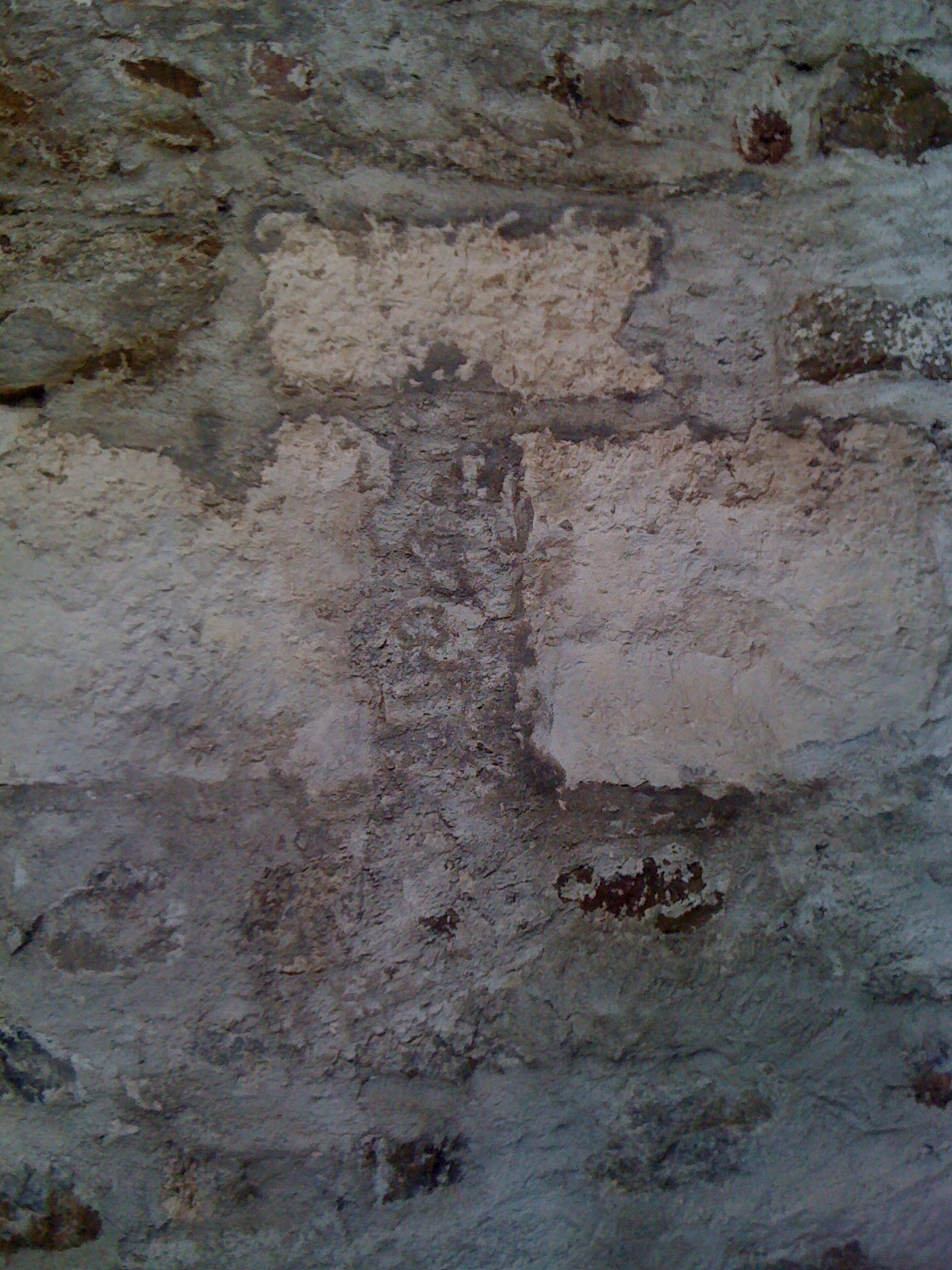
A filled-in embrasure in the chateau

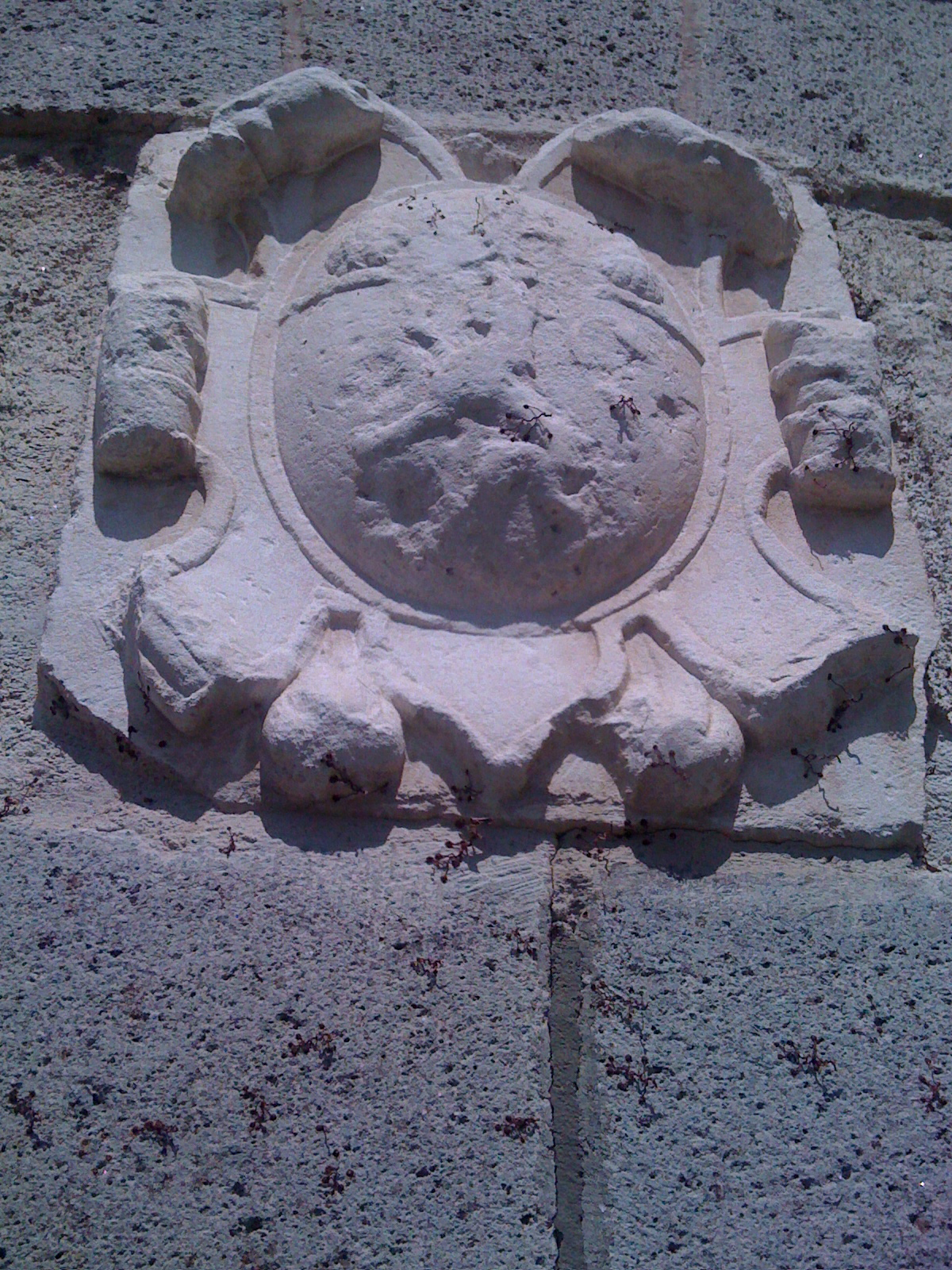
Arms of Carbonat

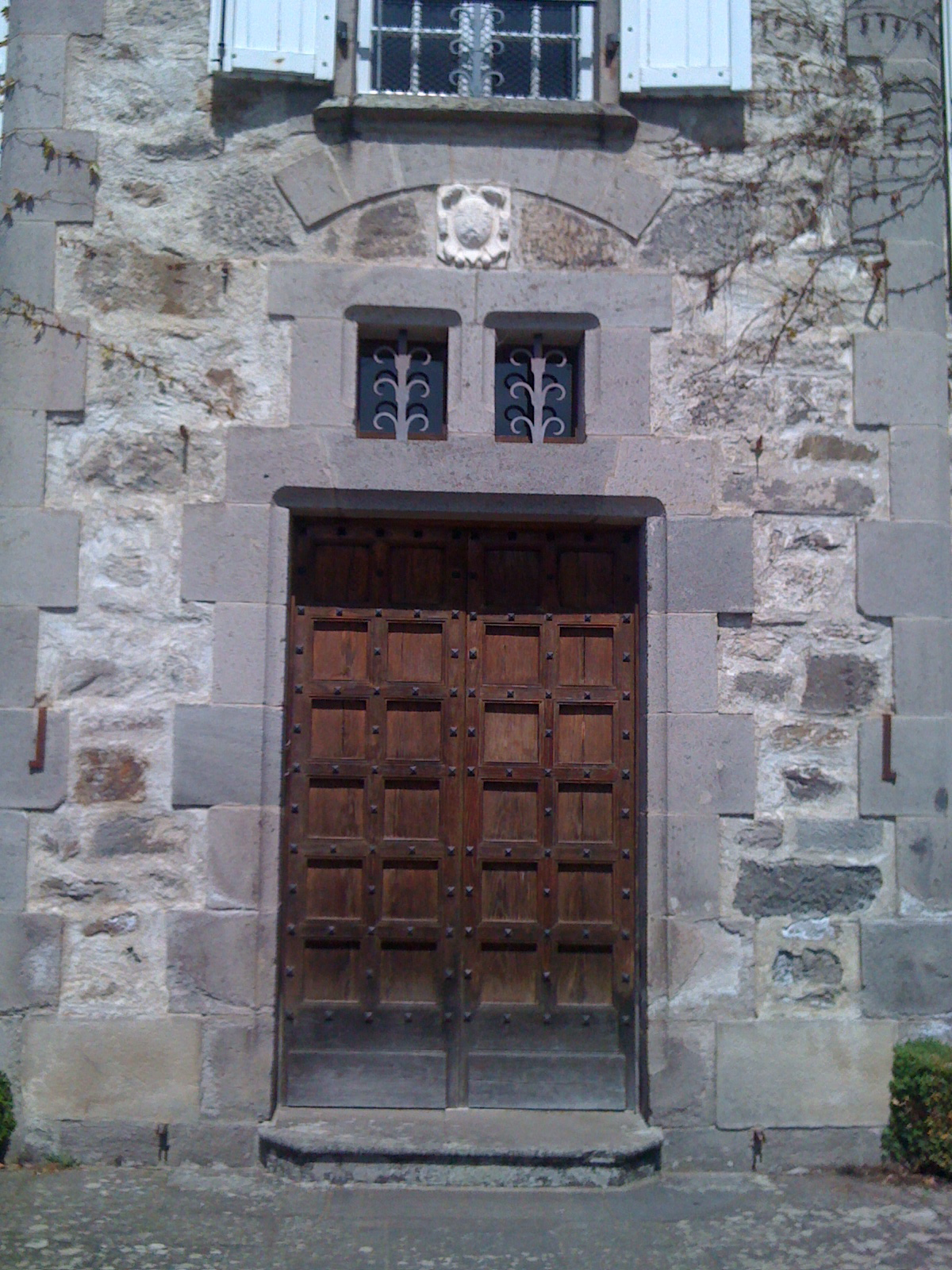
A door in the chateau

== Notable people linked to the commune ==
- Jacques de Milly, Grand Master of the Knights Hospitaller
- Louis Laparra de Fieux (Arpajon 1651-1706), engineer of fortifications and strategist.
- Édouard Jean Baptiste Milhaud (Arpajon 1766 - Aurillac 1833), member of the National Convention, General, Count of the Empire.
- Eugene d'Humières, man of letters, translator of Kipling.
- Louis Dauzier, politician and mayor of Aurillac under the French Third Republic.
- Antoine Dusserre (Carbonnat 1865-1925), novelist.
- Léo Pons, filmmaker.

== See also ==
- Communes of the Cantal department
