= Cēres Parish =

Administrative unit in Latvia

- parish of Latvia
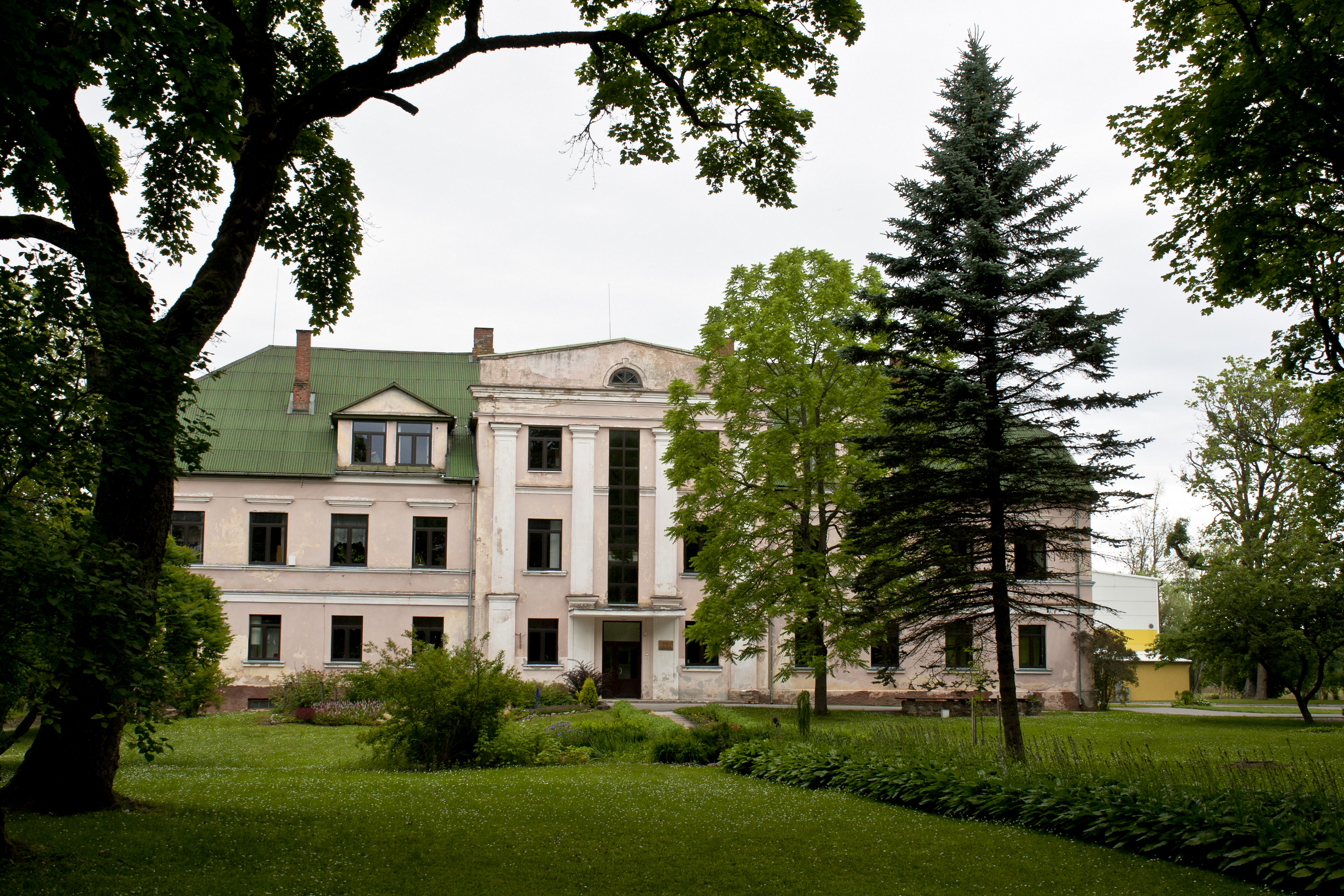
- Casa Senyorial de Cēre

- Coat of arms

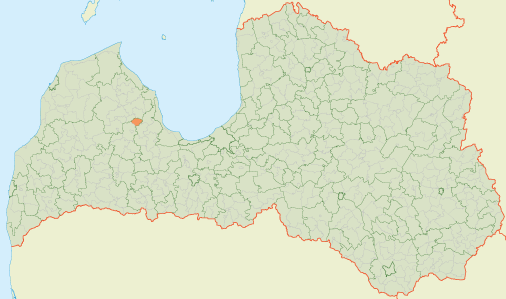
- Coordinates: 57°06′26″N 22°52′10″E
- Country: Latvia

Population (1 January 2026)
  - Total: 423

Cēre parish is an administrative unit of Tukums Municipality, Latvia, in the historical region of Courland.

== See also ==
- Cēre Manor
