= Cēre Manor =

Manor house in Latvia

- Cēres Parish, Courland, Latvia
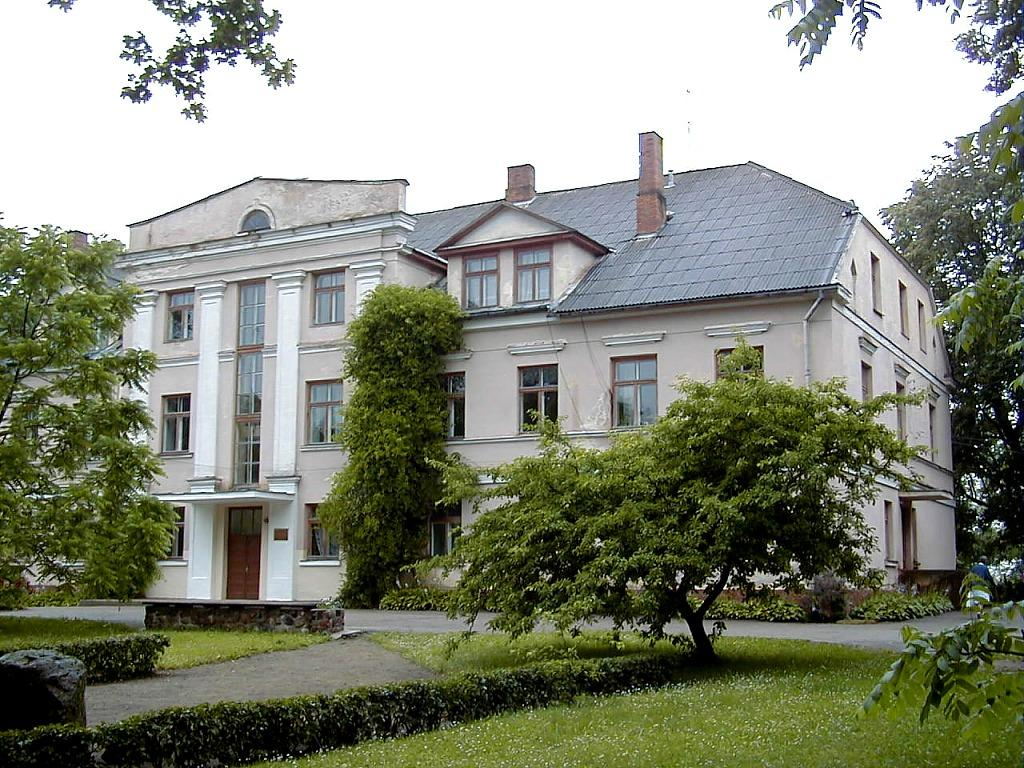

Site information
- Type: Manor

Location
- Coordinates: 57°06′29.4″N 22°52′03.1″E

Cēre Manor (Latvian: Cēres muižas pils, German: Zehren ) is a manor house in Cēres Parish in Tukums Municipality in the historical region of Courland, in western Latvia.

== History ==
Cēre Manor (Knight Manor) was established in 1352 from the ancient Riga Heinrich county. From 1492 till 1658 the following noble families owned manor: the von Altenbok family, then the family of von Funk, von Rap, von Shilling, Heiking and von Han. The last owners of the manor from 1883 to 1920 were von Knigge family.

In the 1860s the two-storeyed manor house of Cēre Manor was rebuilt. The project to modernize the manor house was implemented by Theodore Zeiler, a Kurzeme architect. At the beginning of the 20th century the manor estate had 1022 hectares of land, two half manors (Baltklavs and Lilija manors), a pub and 19 farmhouses. The manor had a pub, a dairy, a cheese factory, a windmill and a tar mill. At the beginning of 1919, during the Bolshevik revolution, the Cēre Parish Executive Committee was operating in the manor house. Manor owner baron Adam von Knigge had to flee to escape arrest. Later, the main manor house remained empty.

During the agrarian reform in Latvia in 1920s, the land of the manor was nationalized and divided into smaller farms. The manor house was granted to the Cēre parish for school use in 1921 and has housed the Cēre school ever since. The building was rebuilt in 1940 and 1941 at the expense of the parish. In the center of the manor there was also a post office and a telephone exchange, Cēre dairy company "Spēks (Power)" and Small farmers' promotion cooperative "Palīgs (Helper)". There was also the Agricultural Society, the Ceres Consumer Society, the Ceres Mutual Insurance Society, the Ceres Branch of the Latvian Society for the Promotion of Culture, as well as the Division of the Guard Regiment, the Small Regiment and the Guard Circle. From the autumn of 1944 until the end of the war, there was a German military hospital in the former mansion. The Cēre primary school is still located in the manor house of Cēre Manor today. There is a small museum in the school.

== See also ==
- List of palaces and manor houses in Latvia
