= Louis Laloy =

French musicologist and writer

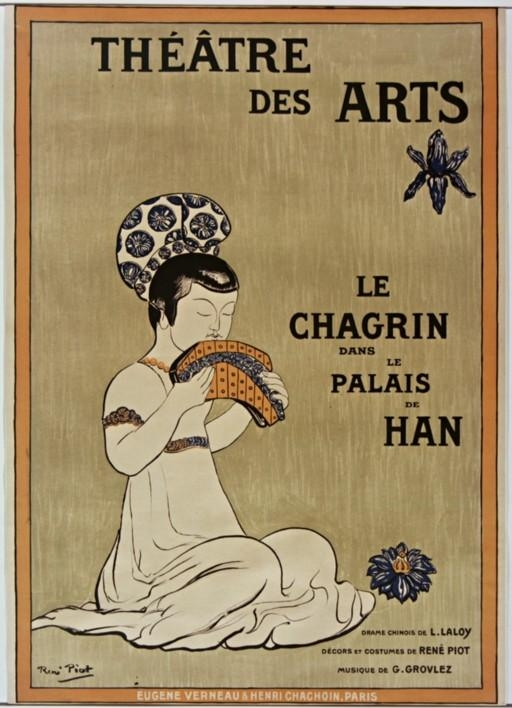
Le Chagrin dans le palais de Han, Chinese drama by Louis Laloy. Theatre poster by René Piot, 1900. After a play by Ma Zhiyuan.

Louis Laloy (Gray, 18 February 1874 – Dole, 4 March 1944) was a French musicologist, writer and sinologist. A Doctor of Letters (he spoke French, English, German, Italian, Latin, Russian, Greek and Chinese), he became an eminent musicologist, music critic, co-founder of Le Mercure musical, teacher at the Sorbonne and at the Paris Conservatory, and Secretary General of the Paris Opera.

He is associated with many prominent artists and composers. He was a friend and (after the English book by Louise Liebich) the first French biographer of Claude Debussy and wrote books on his contemporaries Maurice Ravel, Igor Stravinsky, Erik Satie, and Paul Dukas, as well as Jean-Philippe Rameau (1683–1764) who was then rediscovered.
