= Ceres, West Virginia =

Unincorporated community in West Virginia, United States

- Unincorporated community
- Location within the state of West Virginia Ceres, West Virginia (the United States)
- Coordinates: 37°18′28″N 81°08′52″W
- Country: United States
- State: West Virginia
- County: Mercer
- Elevation: 2,434 ft (742 m)
- Time zone: UTC-5 (Eastern (EST))
  - Summer (DST): UTC-4 (EDT)
- Area codes: 304 & 681
- GNIS feature ID: 1554104

Ceres is an unincorporated community in Mercer County, West Virginia, United States. Ceres is located on West Virginia Route 123, 4.5 miles (7.2 km) south-southwest of Princeton.
