= Ceres (1800 ship) =

British slave ship and merchantman 1800–1822

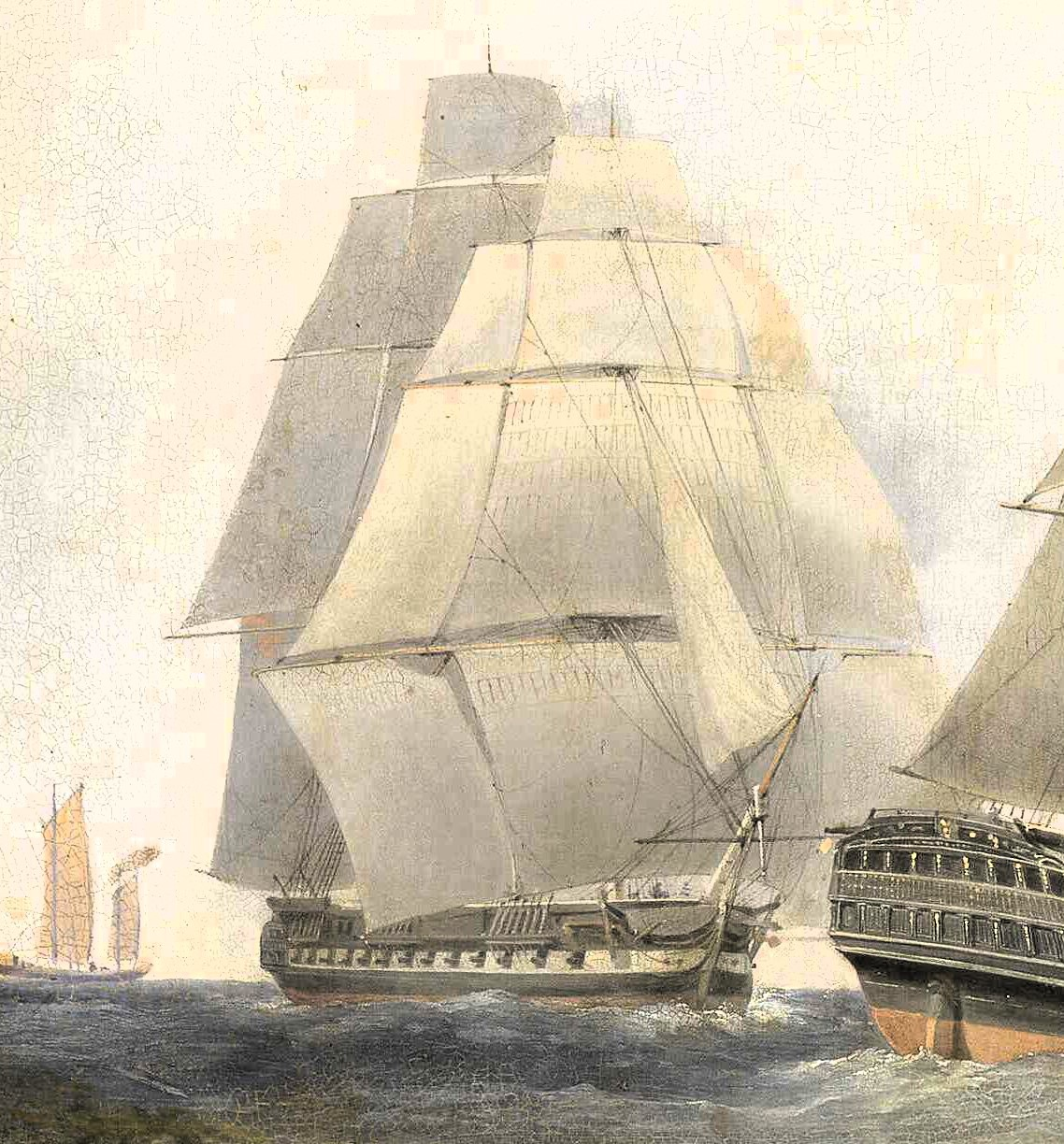
- Ceres in the China Seas, c. 1820, by Huggins

History

France
- Launched: 1784
- Captured: c. 1800

Great Britain
- Name: Ceres
- Namesake: Ceres - the Roman goddess of agriculture
- Owner: 1800: James & Co.; 1813:Powell & Co.
- Acquired: c. 1800 by purchase of a prize
- Fate: Last listed 1822

General characteristics
- Tons burthen: 318, or 331, or 353 (bm)
- Propulsion: Sail
- Sail plan: Brig
- Complement: 1800: 25; 1801: 35; 1804: 35; 1805: 40
- Armament: 1800: 20 × 9 & 12-pounder guns; 1801:16 × 9-pounder guns; 1804:16 × 9-pounder guns; 1805:18 × 9-pounder guns

Ceres was launched in France in 1784. The British captured her circa 1800 and sold her as a prize. Once under British ownership she sailed to the Mediterranean, but in 1801 she started sailing in the slave trade. She made four voyages as a slave ship, gathering slaves in West Africa and delivering them to the West Indies. After the abolition of the British slave trade in 1807 she became a West Indiaman, and then an East Indiaman. She was last listed in 1822.

== Career ==
Ceres first appeared in Lloyd's Register (LR) with Carmont, master, James & Co., owners, and trade Liverpool–Naples. Captain David Carmont acquired a letter of marque on 9 June 1800.

Ceres then became a slaver. She made four voyages carrying slaves from West Africa to the West Indies.

1st slave voyage (1801–1802): Captain Adam Elliott acquired a letter of marque on 1 August 1801. Ceres sailed from Liverpool on 23 August 1801. She gathered slaves at Calabar and delivered them at Trinidad 23 February 1802. There she landed 293 slaves. She arrived back at Liverpool on 9 June. She had left Liverpool with 35 crew members and suffered five crew deaths on the voyage.

2nd slave voyage (1802–1803): Captain Elliott sailed from Liverpool on 26 August 1802. She gathered slaves at West Africa and delivered them to Havana, probably in March 1803. There she landed 309 slaves. Ceres returned to Liverpool on 20 July 1803. She had left with 31 crew members and suffered five crew deaths on the voyage.

3rd slave voyage (1804–1805): Captain Elliott acquired a letter of marque on 25 February 1804. Ceres sailed from Liverpool on 12 April 1804. She gathered her slaves at Calabar and arrived at Kingston on 9 December 1804, where she landed 300 slaves. She left Kingston on 20 April 1805 and arrived back at Liverpool on 5 July 1805. She had left with 41 crew members and suffered five crew deaths on the voyage.

4th slave voyage (1805−1806): Captain Daniel Robinson acquired a letter of marque on 19 October 1805. Captain Robinson sailed from Liverpool on 9 October 1805. She gathered her slaves at Bonny Island and arrived at Charleston 26 or 27 May 1806. There she landed 300 slaves. When she arrived at Charleston her master was Captain William Turnbull. She left Charleston on 29 July, and arrived back at Liverpool on 3 September 1806. She had left with 31 crew members and suffered five crew deaths on the voyage.

Lloyd's Register and the Register of Shipping (RS) were only as accurate as owners chose to keep them. Also, they published at slightly different times of the year. Thus there are frequently discrepancies between them in the information about the ships they list.

Year	Master	Owner	Trade	Source & notes
1808	W.Stringer; W. Travers	James & Co.	Liverpool–Africa	LR; large repairs in 1800, 1806, and 1808
1810	W. Travers; J. Robinson	James & Co.	Liverpool–Demerara	LR; large repairs in 1800, 1806, and 1808

Ceres, John Robinson, master, arrived at Demerara on 7 July 1810. She planned to return to Liverpool early in August.

Year	Master	Owner	Trade	Source & notes
1813	Kneube; R. Burns	James & Co. Powell & Co.	Liverpool–West Indies	RS; damage repaired 1808
1815	R.Burns	Pond & Co.	Liverpool–San Domingo	LR; large repair in 1808 and damages repaired 1812

On 15 September 1815 Ceres, Burns, master, arrived in the Liverpool River from San Domingo having lost her main top mast and having sustained other damage. She went on shore on Woodside Bank. There her cargo was discharged.

In 1813 the EIC had lost its monopoly on the trade between India and Britain. British ships were then free to sail to India or the Indian Ocean under a license from the EIC.

Year	Master	Owner	Trade	Source & notes
1816	Burns; T. Lyall	Powell & Co.	Liverpool–West Indies	RS; repairs 1814

On 15 May 1816 Ceres, Brown, master, sailed from Liverpool for Bengal under a license from the EIC. On 6 June 1817 Ceres, Brown, master, sailed from Bengal, bound for Liverpool.

The Register of Shipping, in its list of licensed ships, simply stated that Ceres, Lyall, master had sailed for Calcutta in 1816.

Although the registers continued to carry Ceres with stale data, she does not appear in SAD data in subsequent years.

Year	Master	Owner	Trade	Source & notes
1818	W. Brown	Powell & Co.	Liverpool–Calcutta	LR; large repair 1808, and damages repaired 1812 and 1815
1818	T.Lyall	Powell & Co.	Liverpool–Calcutta	RS; damages repaired and large repair 1815
1820	W. Brown	Powell & Co.	Liverpool–Calcutta	LR; large repair in 1808 and damages repaired 1815
1820	T.Lyall	Powell & Co.	Liverpool–Calcutta	SR; damages repaired and large repair 1815
1822	W. Brown	Powell & Co.	Liverpool–Calcutta	LR; large repair in 1808 and damages repaired 1815
