= Centre for Research on Energy Security =

Indian energy research center

The Centre for Research on Energy Security (CeRES) is an Indian research center housed at The Energy and Resources Institute (TERI) focusing on Indian relations to energy and consequences on itself and the world, diplomatically, economically and socially. The center was created on 31 May 2005. The CeRES team is based in the India Habitat Centre office of TERI in New Delhi, India.

== Core areas ==
CeRES conducts research and provides analysis, information, and directions on issues related to energy security in India. It tracks global energy demands, supply, prices, and technological research/breakthroughs, and analyses their implications for the world and India's energy security.

The center also engages in national, regional, and international dialogues on energy security issues, leading to new strategic partnerships with international entities, and taking initiatives that would be in India's and the region's long-term interest.

CeRES' core research areas are:

- Energy security
- Geopolitics of energy
- Energy pricing and subsidies
- Energy regulation and policy frameworks
- Patterns of energy demand and supply

== Projects undertaken ==
Projects undertaken by CeRES are sponsored by various multilateral institutions, government agencies and private entities. Projects include:

- The study on the reform of India's fossil fuel subsidies, sponsored by International Institute for Sustainable Development (IISD) and Global Subsidies Initiative (GSI).
- Evaluation of the pilot project on Direct Benefit Transfer of Kerosene subsidies in Alwar sponsored by IISD and GSI
- A multi-year study on energy security policy in India, sponsored by the Nand Jeet and Khemka Foundation
- A study on the Bangladesh-China-India-Myanmar Economic Corridor (BCIM-EC) sponsored by Institute of Chinese Studies, Ministry of External Affairs.
- Energy Project on South and South West Asia sponsored by United Nations Economic and Social Commission for Asia and the Pacific.
- A comparative study on power generation costs, sponsored by the Petroleum Federation of India (Petrofed).
- A study on the patterns of rural energy consumption and inequities in India, as a part of the Norwegian Framework Agreement (NFA) sponsored by the Norwegian Ministry of Foreign Affairs (MFA)
- Other studies under the Norwegian Framework Agreement include:
1. Mapping multilateral energy institutions
2. Global oil markets and India's vulnerability to oil shocks
3. The international trends in natural gas markets and its relevance to India
- A study on the European external energy governance, sponsored by Volkswagen Stiftung

== Events ==
CeRES conducts several events on themes surrounding energy security. Past events include:

- 8 February 2008: "Lifestyles, Energy Security, and Climate", an event by CeRES and the Asian Energy Institute (AEI) during Delhi Sustainable Development Summit 2008 with support from the Nand & Jeet Khemka Foundation.

== See also ==
- Energy law
- Energy security
- The Energy and Resources Institute
- Rajendra Pachauri
