= Daniel Cere =

Canadian professor of Religious Studies

Daniel Mark Cere is a professor of Religious Studies at McGill University and researcher on religion, law, and ethics. In 2015 he was appointed Interim-Dean of the Faculty of Religious Studies of McGill University. He also serves as the director of the Institute for the Study of Marriage Law and Culture and Vice President of the Newman Institute of Catholic Studies . He served as director of Montreal's Newman Centre from 2000-2006. Cere has been a consultant for government and religious institutions on issues of religious freedom, reasonable accommodation, and family law in both Canada and the United States.

Cere founded the journal Newman Rambler in 1996 and the Newman Institute of Catholic Studies (incorporated in 2000). In 1998, together with his wife, Jackie Cere (née Darwent), he launched the Dominus Vobiscum marriage and family retreat centre.

In 2018, the Archdiocese of Montreal awarded the Ceres with the Bishop Crowley Memorial award for their 20 years of service at the Dominus Vobiscum retreat centre.

== Publications ==
- The Experts' Story of Courtship (1999)
- The Future of Family Law (2005)
- Divorcing Marriage (2004)
- Toward a Gospel witness: Confronting child abuse (2010)
