= Keres (disambiguation) =

Keres are female death spirits in Greek mythology.

Keres may also refer to:

== People with the surname ==
- Emil Keres (1925–2016), Hungarian actor
- Harald Keres (1912–2010), Estonian physicist
- Paul Keres (1916–1975), Estonian chess grandmaster
- Robert Keres (1907–1946), Estonian basketball and volleyball player

== Other uses ==
- Keres people, a subdivision of the Puebloan peoples in New Mexico
- Keresan languages, languages or dialects spoken by Keres peoples
- Kereš, a river in Hungary and Serbia
