= HMS Ceres =

Three ships and three shore establishments of the Royal Navy have been named HMS Ceres, after the goddess Ceres of Roman mythology.

Ships

- HMS Ceres (1777) was an 18-gun sloop launched in 1777 that the Iphigénie captured in December 1778 off Saint Lucia. The British recaptured her in 1782 and renamed her Raven, only to have the French recapture her again early in 1783. The French returned her name to Cérès and she served in the French Navy until sold at Brest in 1791.
- HMS Ceres (1781) was a 32-gun fifth rate launched in 1781 and broken up in 1830. Because Ceres served in the navy's Egyptian campaign between 8 March 1801 and 2 September, her officers and crew qualified for the clasp "Egypt" to the Naval General Service Medal, which the Admiralty issued in 1847 to all surviving claimants.
- HMS Ceres (D59) was a C-class light cruiser launched in 1917 and sold and broken up in 1946.

Shore establishments

- HMS Ceres (1946 shore establishment) was the Supply and Secretariat training school at Wetherby, Yorkshire, between 1946 and 1958.
- HMS Ceres (1984 shore establishment) was a Royal Naval Reserve communications training centre in Yeadon, West Yorkshire between 1984 and 1995.
- HMS Ceres (2015 shore establishment) (formerly Ceres Division) is a Royal Naval Reserve unit in Leeds, West Yorkshire, commissioned in September 2015.

== Battle honours ==
- 1778 Saint Lucia
- 1801 Egypt
- 1939 Atlantic
- 1944 Normandy
