= KERIS (disambiguation) =

KERIS is the Korea Education and Research Information Service.

Keris may also refer to:

- Keris, the orthographically correct original Javanese spelling for the Kris, the traditional dagger of Java, Indonesia
- Keris Mas (1922-1992), Malaysian writer
