= California Environmental Resources Evaluation System =

State agency

The California Environmental Resources Evaluation System (CERES) is a California Resources Agency program established to coordinate and provide access to a variety of environmental and geoinformation electronic data about California. The goal of CERES is to improve environmental analysis and planning by integrating natural and cultural resource information from multiple sources, then making it available on the World Wide Web.
