= French ship Cérès =

Twelve ships of the French Navy have been named Cérès:

== Ships named Cérès ==
- Cérès (1778), an 18-gun corvette taken from the British.
- Cérès (1780), a 32-gun frigate, lead ship of her class
- Cérès (1795), an Etna-class corvette launched in 1795 renamed Enfant de la Patrie in 1797 and wrecked in 1798
- Mantoue (1797), a Venetian-made frigate, bore the name Cérès during her career.
- Cérès (1799), a 40-gun frigate, formerly the Napolitan Cerere
- Cérès (1811), a 40-gun frigate
- Calypso (1820), a 52-gun frigate, bore the name Cérès during her career.
- Cérès (1826), an 18-gun Bayonnaise-class corvette
- Cérès (1857), a screw frigate
- Cérès (1938), a Minerve-class submarine launched in 1938 and scuttled in 1942
- Cérès (1939), an auxiliary transport
- Cérès (1973), a Circé-class minesweeper
