= Cère =

River in south-western France

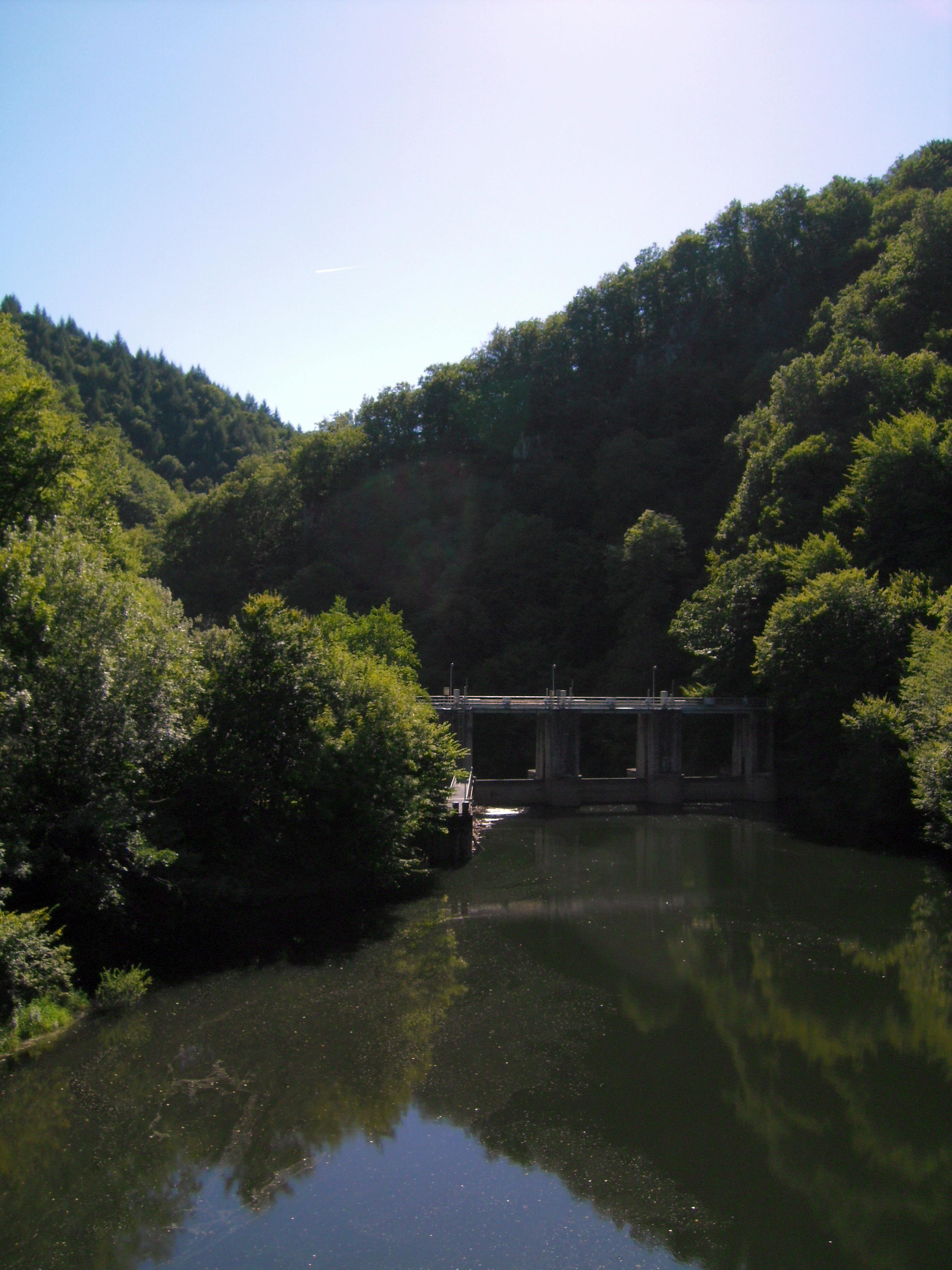
- Cère gorge near Lamativie, where it forms the Corrèze/Lot border, showing hydroelectric barrage.

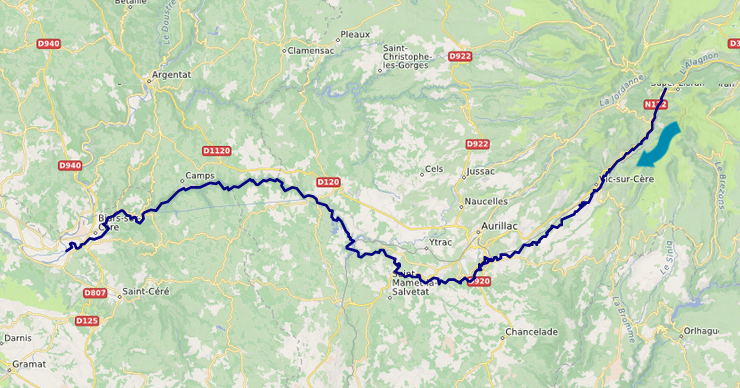

Location
- Country: France

Physical characteristics
- Source
  - location: Massif Central
- Mouth
  - location: Dordogne
  - coordinates: 44°54′33″N 1°48′45″E
- Length: 120 km (75 mi)

Basin features
- Progression: Dordogne→ Gironde estuary→ Atlantic Ocean

The Cère (French pronunciation: [sɛʁ]; Occitan: Sera) is a 120.4 km (75 mi) long river in south-western France, and a left tributary of the Dordogne. Its source is in the south-western Massif Central, near the Plomb du Cantal mountain. It flows generally west through the following départements and towns:

- Cantal: Vic-sur-Cère, Arpajon-sur-Cère (near Aurillac)
- Corrèze
- Lot: Bretenoux

The Cère flows into the Dordogne near Bretenoux.
