= Ceres (East Indiaman) =

Three ships named Ceres, for Ceres, the Roman goddess of agriculture, served the British East India Company (EIC) as East Indiamen:

- Ceres (1773 EIC ship) was launched in 1773 and made four voyages before she was sold in 1784 as a hulk.
- Ceres (1787 EIC ship) was launched in 1787 and made three voyages before the British Royal Navy purchased her and renamed her HMS Grampus. Grampus stranded in 1799 in the Thames and had to be burnt.
- Ceres (1797 EIC ship) was launched in 1797 and made nine voyages for the EIC before she was sold in 1816 as a hulk.

In addition, one vessel named Ceres performed two voyages for the EIC under charter.
